= Northern Nevada 4A Region =

High school athletic league in Nevada, USA

The Northern Nevada 4A Region is a part of the Nevada Interscholastic Activities Association, governing the northern half of Nevada for high school athletics. The Northern 4A league is the large-school level, which has schools with enrollments of 1,200 and higher. The region is split into two leagues. The High Desert League and the Sierra League. Both leagues are divided by proximity with the High Desert encompassing the schools north of Mill Street in Reno, while the schools in the Sierra League are south of Mill Street.

== Current members ==
| School | Mascot | Location | League | Enrollment |
|---|---|---|---|---|
| Carson | Senators | Carson City, Nevada | Sierra | 2,503 |
| Damonte Ranch | Mustangs | Reno, Nevada | Sierra | 1,617 |
| Douglas | Tigers | Minden, Nevada | Sierra | 1,522 |
| Galena | Grizzlies | Reno, Nevada | Sierra | 1,510 |
| Hug | Hawks | Reno, Nevada | High Desert League | 1,266 |
| Manogue | Miners | Reno, Nevada | Sierra | 650 |
| McQueen | Lancers | Reno, Nevada | High Desert League | 1,945 |
| North Valleys | Panthers | Reno, Nevada | High Desert League | 2,227 |
| Reed | Raiders | Sparks, Nevada | High Desert League | 2,464 |
| Reno | Huskies | Reno, Nevada | High Desert League | 1,896 |
| Spanish Springs | Cougars | Sparks, Nevada | High Desert League | 2,315 |
| Wooster | Colts | Reno, Nevada | Sierra | 1,734 |

== Affiliate Members ==
Due to few schools participating in certain sports in the 3A level, some schools play in the 4A as their only option. Schools who compete in various sports such as tennis, swimming and skiing are Fernley, Incline, Lowry, North Tahoe, Truckee, Sage Ridge and Sparks.

== Rivalries ==
- Carson and Douglas- Known as the battle for the Carson Valley.
- Reed and Spanish Springs- These two are the only 4A schools in Sparks.
- North Valleys and Spanish Springs- The battle in the desert. Both schools opened in the same year, 2001.
- Bishop Manogue High School, Damonte High School, and Galena High School - The battle of South Reno.
- Reno High School and Bishop Manogue High School - The battle of the oldest schools in the area.
- North Valleys High School and Hug High School-The Valley Cup

== See also ==
- Sunrise 4A Region
- Sunset 4A Region
- Northern Nevada 3A Region
- Southern Nevada 2A Region
