= Sparks Middle School =

Sparks Middle School may refer to:

- Sparks Middle School - Sparks, Nevada - Washoe County School District
- Sparks Middle School - La Puente, California - Hacienda La Puente Unified School District

== See also ==
- 2013 Sparks Middle School shooting (related to the Nevada school)
