= Rancho San Rafael Regional Park =

Regional park in Reno, Nevada, U.S.

- Hot air balloons during the 2015 Great Reno Balloon Race above Rancho San Rafael Regional Park
- Interactive map of Rancho San Rafael Regional Park
- Location: Reno, Nevada, US
- Coordinates: 39°32′45″N 119°49′26″W
- Area: 580 acres (230 ha)
- Created: 1982
- Visitors: 3.5 million (in 2024)
- Governing body: Washoe County, Nevada
- Website: www.washoecounty.gov/parks/parks/park_directory_pages/north_region/rancho_san_rafael_regional_park.php

Rancho San Rafael Regional Park is a regional park in Reno, Nevada, United States, located at 1595 North Sierra Street. Washoe County describes it as the largest and "most dynamic" park it administers at 580 acres (230 ha). The park features the Wilbur D. May Arboretum and the Wilbur D. May Center. Its location within the Evans Creek drainage basin fuels the park's wetlands. The park includes over 4,000 tree and 1,600 miscellaneous plant species, including some from Asia, Australia, and Patagonia. Waterfowl and native wildlife live in the area.

Rancho San Rafael Regional Park has a total of 16 miles (26 km) of trails, some of which connect the park to trails on Peavine Mountain to the north. The southern portion of the park is developed, and it includes most of the park's amenities. The National Monument to the Basque Sheepherder lies in the southern portion of the park. while. The northern portion is largely undeveloped. Rancho San Rafael Regional Park has hosted several cultural festivals and events, including The Great Reno Balloon Race and the Dragon Lights festival.

The Pincolini family, Italian immigrants, purchased the property of present-day Rancho San Rafael Regional Park in 1896. It was purchased in 1919 and developed into a sheep operation. The owner and his wife died in 1925 and 1939, respectively. European immigrants purchased the property soon after to obtain Nevada citizenship due to favorable tax laws. One of three owners at this time, Raphael Herman, named the ranch "Rancho San Rafael". A $9 million bond issue to finance the purchase of the park and reimburse the Employees Retirement System was presented to Washoe County, the City of Reno and City of Sparks, and eventually passed 2–1 in 1979. The park opened on July 3, 1982, and the Great Reno Balloon Race moved there that year.

== Geography ==
Rancho San Rafael Regional Park lies at 1595 North Sierra Street. There are four entrances: the main entrance is via North Sierra Street and enters the south side of the park through San Rafael Drive. Coleman Drive and Washington Drive also lead to the south side of the park. The northern entrance is accessible from North Virginia Street.

Rancho San Rafael Regional Park encompasses 580 acres (230 ha), both north and south of Nevada State Route 659 (also known as McCarran Boulevard) in northwest Reno. It is the largest park administered by Washoe County. The county describes it as its "most dynamic" regional park. Approximately 25 acres (10 ha) are manicured turf and roughly 80 acres (32 ha) are pastureland. The combined length of the trail network totals 16 miles (26 km). The northern part of the park is largely undeveloped but has disc golf and softball fields. The southern portion is more developed and has volleyball courts, playgrounds, hiking and bike paths, a dog park, and picnic tables.

Rancho San Rafael Regional Park lies in the Truckee Meadows. Prior to European colonization, the Truckee Meadows were covered in tall grasses, cottonwood species, and willows, with creeks and wetlands flowing in between sagebrush. The park features wetlands, meadows, farmland, and desert shrubland. It lies at the foot of Peavine Mountain near Evans Canyon where drainage from Evans Creek provides an intermittent source for the park's wetlands and Herman Pond.

== History ==
Prior to European settlement, native Washoe and Northern Paiute populations lived in the area, often fishing in the area's wetlands and creeks and hunting. In 1896, the Italian Pincolini family immigrated to the Truckee Meadows and purchased 160 acres (65 ha) of land in what is now Rancho San Rafael Regional Park for $2,750 (1896 USD). The property was acquired by Richard Jensen in 1919. Jensen developed the property into a sheep ranch, residing there with his wife, Halda Dirix, and two children. They constructed a residence in the early 1920s, and the size of the property expanded to 312 acres (126 ha). Jensen died in a vehicle accident in August 1925 near Truckee, California and Dirix died in 1935 after remarrying. The property was sold to Raphael Herman, his brother Norman Herman, and sister-in-law Mariana Herman. Raphael and Herman were German and Mariana Austro–Hungarian.

The Hermans primarily lived in the Los Angeles area, purchasing the ranch to become Nevada residents because of "favorable" tax laws, despite mostly residing in California. They named the ranch "Rancho San Rafael" after Raphael. The Hermans hired Paul R. Williams to design what is now the Herman House in 1936; construction was completed later that year. The house has eighteen rooms that were capable of fitting the Herman’s and their staff. An adjacent house accommodated caretakers and property maintenance workers. After several purchases of adjacent properties, Rancho San Rafael became one of the largest single properties in the Truckee Meadows at 415 acres (168 ha). Raphael died in 1946, and Norman died in 1960.

In 1969, William Thornton from the University of Nevada, Reno (UNR) Land Foundation sent Mariana two appraisals to divide the property, but she did not want to divide the property and there was no agreement. Clark Santini, a UNR student, contacted Washoe County to advocate for it to buy the property and turn it into a regional park. Santini, Virginia Kersey, and Washoe County Parks Director Gene Sullivan proposed that Washoe County, the City of Reno and the City of Sparks finance the purchase through a bond issue. The Democratic Party representative for Washoe County, Jim Richardson, and the Nevada Republican Party representative, Frank Farankov, reached a bipartisan agreement to advertise the proposal in debates. The proposition was brought up before the Washoe County Legislature, and the City of Sparks was opposed. In 1979, the director of the Employees Retirement System proposed to purchase the property if a bond issue to reimburse the agency was approved. The Washoe County Commission approved the $9 million bond issue 2–1 in 1979, and Rancho San Rafael was purchased that year.

The grand opening of the property as a regional park occurred on July 3, 1982. A parade and show included two elephants from the Nugget Casino Resort in Sparks. The Great Reno Balloon Race moved to the park that year. The Wilbur D. May Arboretum and Botanical Garden opened in 1983 and houses 94 gardens across 13 acres (5.3 ha). The Wilbur D. May Museum opened in 1985 showcases May's items from his extensive world travel. In 2001, a cattle and hay pasture was converted to a multi-use pasture that permitted off-leash dogs. A small amusement park, Wilbur D. May's Great Basin Adventure, operated in the park and included a petting zoo, water log ride, and pony rides. It closed in 2008 due to budget cuts during the Great Recession.

The Nevada Farms and Families Area (NFF) operates in the former Great Basin Adventure adjacent to the Wilbur D. May Museum. The water log ride and defunct concession stand are still noticeable at the entrance. The plot includes the rentable Brahma and Leghorn picnic pavilions and Herman Pond. In 2021, park rangers established a community garden in the area, with some crops those of volunteers and others maintained by Washoe County and UNR for demonstration purposes. The Pollinator Garden, inaugurated in 2022, includes several hundred native wildflowers that attract butterflies and bees. The NFF hosts the Discovery Room oriented towards children. It includes a playroom that is open part-time in summer and a library. The NFF cares for one turkey, one chicken, and one rooster.

Plans exist to improve the parking lot and tree placement coordination with the Great Reno Balloon Races. The county opened its first "all inclusive" playground in Rancho San Rafael on November 1, 2025. The Washoe County Commission approved an $866,000 (2026 USD) agreement with the engineering company DOWL, LLC, on March 17, 2026, to begin construction of an amphitheater in the park. It is being built in the southeast area of the park near the Wilbur D. May Arboretum. It is designed to include several picnic areas, a covered pavilion, performance stage, and seating for 2,000–2,500 people.

== Ecology ==
Panoramic view of the park from the West University neighborhood

There are over 4,000 tree species in the park. Some non-native species come from Patagonia, Africa, and Australia. The Wilbur D. May Arboretum and Botanical Garden has 94 small gardens and encompasses 13 acres (5.3 ha). It has 1,700 trees, 4,600 native and foreign plants, and 55 individual bird species. The vegetation in the park absorbs approximately 20 tons of carbon annually. Waterfowl, particularly the pied-billed grebe, American coot, and ruddy duck are found in Herman's Pond. Long-eared and great horned owl can be seen from the Nature Trail. Herman's Pond and Rancho San Rafael Pond lie in the park; the latter has been stocked with rainbow trout by the Nevada Department of Wildlife. Wild bears and mountain lions have been spotted in the park.

== Monuments and memorials ==
Galaxy Grove, a memorial to the passengers and crew who died in the Galaxy Airlines Flight 203 crash, was dedicated in the park in 1986. The original monument consisted of a bronze plaque surrounded by a grove of pine trees. After it was stolen in late 2013, it was replaced with a granite plaque mounted on a two-ton boulder.

Historical markers are placed in the park. One details the life of Wilbur D. May and two detail the history of the Wilbur D. May Center and the Great Reno Balloon Race. The Chinese Pagoda Pavilion, a rentable picnic area, was built in 1984 by the Joss House Society as a memorial to Reno's historical Chinatown society.

=== National Monument to the Basque Sheepherder ===
National Monument to the Basque Sheepherder
- Type: Sculpture
- Material: Base: Concrete and river rock Sculpture: Cast bronze
- Height: 22 feet (6.7 m)
- Weight: 5 tons
- Dedicated date: Basque sheepherders
- Inauguration date: August 27, 1989

The National Monument to the Basque Sheepherder is a national monument located in the park, north of McCarran Boulevard. The Basque people settled in the Western United States, primarily for sheepherding purposes, between the late 19th century and the 1950s. Peavine Mountain was historically a sheep grazing range. Chicago Sculpture International invited the Basque Government to its 1984 annual exhibit. José Ramón Cengotitabengoa, a representative of a Basque steel foundry, first floated the idea. Cengotitabengoa decided to place the monument in Reno due to its cultural center for Basque settlement and its tourism industry. The subsequent committee raised approximately $350,000 by 1989. It was inaugurated on August 27, 1989. Several of the bronze plaques and letters at the base of the monument were stolen in 2011 and replaced with steel replicants in 2012. In 2009, a spokesperson for the Washoe County Regional Parks and Open Space said that "[t]rash and graffiti is always going to be a challenge".

The concrete and river rock base lies beneath the sculpture, three green vertical slabs of cast bronze intersect at an abstract shepherd that holds a lamb and the circular Moon lies on a slab above. The sculpture is 22 feet (6.7 m) tall and weighs 5 tons.

== Recreation ==
The trail network at Rancho San Rafael Regional Park totals 16 miles (26 km). The Nature Trail is 1.1 miles (1.8 km) and circles a riparian zone. Trails that traverse the lands near the Wilbur D. May Arboretum total 1.2 miles (1.9 km) Evans Creek Trail is 0.7 miles (1.1 km); it passes under the McCarran Boulevard underpass and connects to the Nature Trail and the National Monument to the Basque Sheepherder. Pasture Loop Trail is 1.4 miles (2.3 km) and loops around pastureland. South Park Loop Trail loops around a pastureland and leads to the Wilbur D. May Museum. Rancho San Rafael Regional Park functions as a trailhead for several trails on Peavine Peak: the Rancho Connector, at 1.4 miles (2.3 km) long, serves as a hiking and mountain biking trail that connects the park to the East Keystone Trail System in the Peavine Mountain.

Rancho San Rafael Regional Park has hosted the Dragon Lights Festival, a nighttime Chinese lantern festival, for six years. It is typically themed on Chinese culture. The park has also hosted events part of Artown, a festival held every July since 1996 that has performances related to art, theater, dance, and music. The park served as a venue for the opening Smash Mouth performance in 2026. Rancho San Rafael Regional Park has hosted Reno's annual Holi (Festival of Colors) celebration since 2015.

There are multiple playgrounds, including Washoe County's first "all-inclusive" playground. The county offers a Junior Ranger Program at Rancho San Rafael Regional Park. Fishing is available at Herman's Pond; the park hosted Youth Fishing Education Day in October 2016, organized by the Academy of Arts, Careers and Technology. There are five large picnic areas that require reservations and several dozen individual sites; the rentable pavilions include the Peavine Pavilion, Chinese Pagoda Pavilion, and the Lions Highland Pavilion in the main region of the park and the Brahma Pavilion and Leghorn Pavilion in the land used by Nevada Farms and Families. The Herman House, also known as the Ranch House, is rented out for private events. A multi-use pasture in the southern part of the park also serves as an off-leash dog park. It is flood irrigated annually from April to October. The pastureland opened to dogs in 2001. It temporarily closed in June 2021 to prevent damage after extended drought, reopening in November 2022. It is surrounded by a fence to prevent cattle from leaving the pastureland. Dogs are permitted on-leash outside of the dog park. There are disc golf, softball, and volleyball fields.
