= Robert McQueen High School =

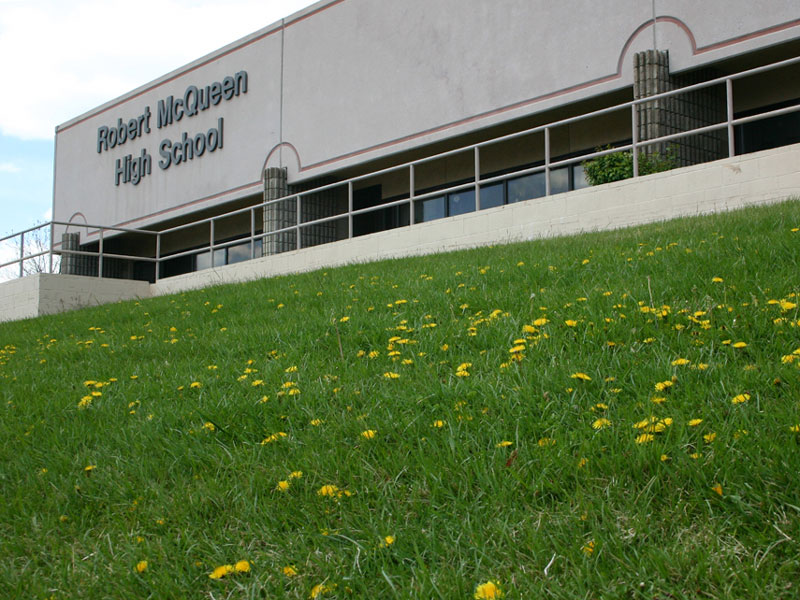
- View from Lancer Street

Location
- 6055 Lancer Street; Reno, Nevada 89523; United States; 39.5344°N 119.8835°W

Information
- Type: Public secondary
- Motto: "Quest for Excellence"
- Established: 1982
- Principal: Freeman Holbrook
- Staff: 69.50 (FTE)
- Faculty: 98
- Enrollment: 1,737 (2023-2024)
- Student to teacher ratio: 24.99
- Colors: Blue and gray
- Mascot: Lancers
- Rival: Reno High School
- Campus surroundings: Suburban
- Website: www.washoeschools.net/mcqueen

Robert McQueen High School is a public secondary school in Reno, Nevada, United States. It is part of the Washoe County School District.

== History ==
The school was named for Dr. Robert McQueen, emeritus professor of psychology at the University of Nevada, Reno. During his tenure from 1955 to 1991, Dr. McQueen headed UNR's scholarship program, served as department chair and dean, and was appointed to Nevada's first psychological board of examiners. Dr. McQueen served on the Washoe County School District Board of Trustees from 1969 to 1990, during which the district built several new schools, including Reed and McQueen . He also negotiated the purchase of McQueen's 60-acre (240,000 m^{2}) site from the Bureau of Land Management for just one dollar.

When the school opened in 1982, adjoining Seventh Street and Robb Drive were only dirt roads extended out to allow access to the school. Some remarked the school was "in the middle of nowhere" as it was more than a mile from other buildings. Since then, the construction of numerous subdevelopments has resulted in overcrowding problems. The building was designed for an enrollment of 1,600; in 2009/10 more than 1,800 were enrolled. In order to mitigate overcrowding concerns and comply with local fire regulations, several modular classrooms have been added to the campus.

In 2010, Newsweek listed McQueen as the 740th best high school in the United States using the ratio of number of AP exams taken to graduating students as its criterion.

In March 2018, student Noah Christiansen called the office of U.S. Representative Mark Amodei to argue in favor of banning bump stocks and raising the minimum age to buy a gun. A staffer who worked for Amodei called Robert McQueen High School for his use of the word "fuck", which led to Christiansen's suspension. On March 19, the American Civil Liberties Union sent a letter to the school district demanding that the suspension be overturned. On March 23, the school district decided to withdraw the suspension to avoid "expensive and protracted litigation", but stood by the school's action to punish the student.

== Extracurricular activities ==
=== Athletics ===
McQueen High School football stadium

- The Lancers compete in the High Desert League, which is part of the Northern Nevada 5A Region. McQueen competes in the 5A level, which is the large school category. In 2008, rivals.com named them the 75th Best High School Football Team in the nation. They beat Palo Verde High School in a rematch of the 2001 state semi-final game on December 6, 2008, with a score of 13-12 for the Nevada 4A High School Football Championship. They finished ranked 48th in the nation by Rivals.com.

Nevada Interscholastic Activities Association State Championships

- Basketball (Girls) - 1996, 1997, 1998, 1999
- Football - 1990, 1992, 1997, 2000, 2002, 2008, 2010
- Soccer (Girls) - 2003,2023
- Softball - 2005, 2006
- Swimming (Girls) - 1995
- Track and Field (Boys) - 2010, 2014, 2022
- Track and Field (Girls) - 2010
- Cross Country (Boys) - 2014, 2015

=== Music ===
MARCHING BAND The marching band has won the state championships seventeen times: (1986, 1987, 1988, 1995, 1996, 1998, 2002, 2003, 2005, 2007, 2008, 2009, 2010, 2011, 2017, 2019, 2024, 2025)

The band has played in the following parades:

- Hollywood Christmas Parade, Los Angeles, CA (2012, 2003)
- Graeagle July 4 Parade (2018 [First Place], 2012, 2010, 2009, 2008)
- Reno Rodeo Parade (2018, 2017, 2012, 2010, 2009 [First Place], 2008 [First Place], 2007 [First Place])
- Fiesta Bowl Parade, Phoenix, AZ (2010/11 Class B National Champion; Field Show, Fourth Place in the Nation; 2006 Class B National Champion Field Show, Fifth Place in the Nation; 2018 Field show and Parade, Second Place Field Show and First Place Field Conductor)
- Tournament of Roses Parade, Pasadena, CA (2014, 2009)
- American Legion National Convention, Non-Competitive (2007)
- Presidential Inaugural Parade, Washington, DC (2005)

CHOIR

- The Robert McQueen High School Choir performed in Carnegie Hall in 2007, June 2009, March 2019, and May 2026.
- McQueen’s Vox Cantare Choir participated in the 2026 Aloha Choral Festival in O’ahu Hawaii.
- McQueen’s Choir has toured England, France, Switzerland, Austria, Germany, Italy, and the Czech Republic in 2016, 2018, and 2024.
- McQueen's Core Jazz vocal ensemble won the "Best in Nevada" award at the UNR Jazz Festival in 2005.
- McQueen's Core Jazz choir also had a concert tour of 5 cities in China for the World Choir Games, held in Shaoxing, China, July 2010.

ORCHESTRA

- The McQueen Orchestra with Kenny Baker has played at the ASTA National Conference in 2010 in Santa Clara, California

=== Speech and Debate ===
Competes in NNFL (Sagebrush League). Team has qualified for 31 National Tournaments, held by the National Speech and Debate Association.

Achievements

2023- 3 National Qualifiers for National Speech and Debate Tournament in Mesa, Arizona.

2024- 1 National Qualifier, 2 National Competitors for National Speech and Debate Tournament in Des Moines, Iowa.

2025- 4 National Qualifiers for the 100th National Speech and Debate Tournament in Des Moines, Iowa.

=== Publications ===
- The Excalibur — monthly school newspaper, inducted into the National Scholastic Press Association's Hall of Fame in the fall of 2004, making it the only student publication in the state to be inducted. It won a NSPA Newspaper Pacemaker in 2009.
- "McQueen TV" — closed circuit television station (daily broadcast news show) and video production facility
- Chrysalis — annual literary magazine
- Caxton — yearbook, awarded the national Silver Crown award in 2006 and the NSPA Yearbook Pacemaker in 2008.

== Demographics ==
In 2009, the school's total enrollment was 1,884, and its ethnic makeup was:

- Native American/Alaskan Native 39 (2.1%)
- Asian/Pacific Islander 231 (12.3%)
- Hispanic 262 (13.9%)
- Black 79 (4.2%)
- White 1,273 (67.6%)

== Notable alumni ==
- 1985, Terri Ivens, actress
- 1986, Michael Landsberry, teacher and military veteran killed during the 2013 Sparks Middle School shooting
- 1987, Mädchen Amick, actress, Alice Cooper on Riverdale
- 1989, David Byerman, CEO of Chester County, PA
- 1989, Nicole King, molecular biologist, professor and MacArthur Fellowship winner
- 1996, Teresa Benitez, former Miss Nevada 2002 and politician
- 1997, Chris Aguila, former baseball outfielder, played with the New York Mets
- 1998, April Meservy, singer and songwriter
- 2001, Ryan Bader, professional MMA fighter, won The Ultimate Fighter: Team Nogueira vs. Team Mir, was competing in the UFC's Light Heavyweight Division, currently the Light Heavyweight Champion of Bellator MMA
- 2001, Chris Carr, football defensive back, played for Oakland Raiders, Tennessee Titans, Baltimore Ravens, Minnesota Vikings, San Diego Chargers & New Orleans Saints before retiring in March 2014
- 2002, Jeff Rowe, football quarterback, played for Cincinnati Bengals, Seattle Seahawks & New England Patriots
- 2002, Ryan Thomas, wrestler; current professional mixed martial arts fighter for American Top Team
- 2003, Clint Stitser, football kicker, played for New York Jets, Seattle Seahawks, Cincinnati Bengals & Washington Redskins in the NFL; played for the Las Vegas Locomotives in the United Football League (2009–2012)
- 2009, Kyle Van Noy, football linebacker
- 2016, Brandon Aiyuk, football wide receiver
- 2022, Robby Snelling, pitcher in Miami Marlins organization
