= Michael Landsberry =

American math teacher and Marine veteran

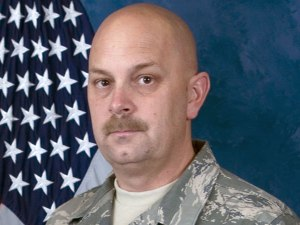
- Born: January 20, 1968; Birmingham, Alabama, U.S.
- Died: October 21, 2013 (aged 45); Sparks Middle School, Sparks, Nevada, U.S.
- Cause of death: Homicide by shooting
- Occupations: Teacher, former Marine, Air National Guardsman
- Known for: Attempting to protect children during the Sparks Middle School shooting
- Spouse: Sharon Landsberry
- Children: 2 stepdaughters
- Military career
- Allegiance: United States
- Branch: United States Marine Corps; Nevada Air National Guard
- Rank: Master Sergeant (E-7)
- Conflicts: War in Afghanistan
- Awards: Airman's Medal; Air Force Commendation Medal

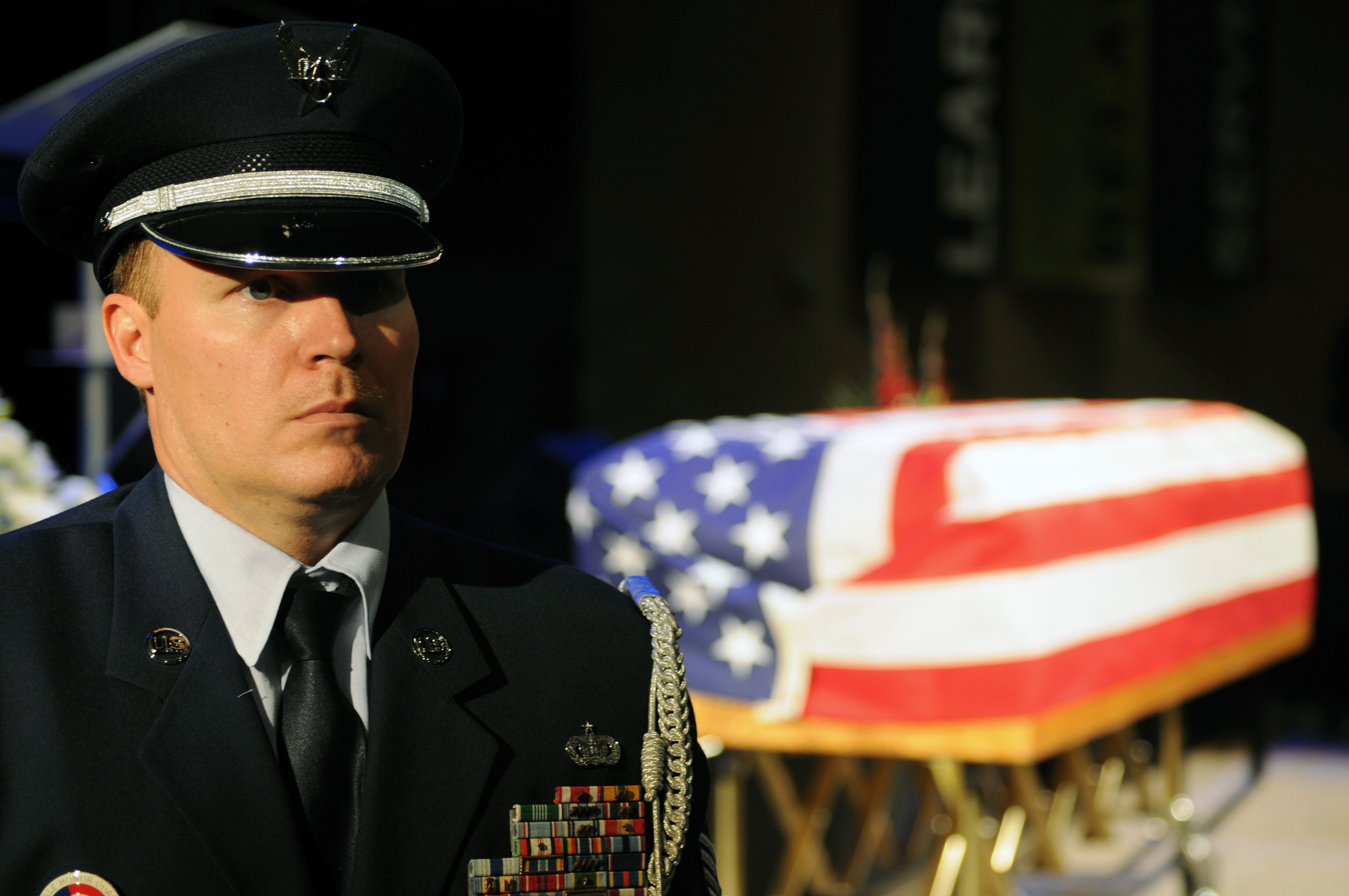
U.S. Air Force Master Sgt. Clinton Dudley with the Nevada Air National Guard, stands watch in front of a casket holding Master Sgt. Michael Landsberry

Michael Terrence Landsberry (January 20, 1968 – October 21, 2013) was an American math teacher, Marine veteran, and Nevada Air National Guardsman who had served in the war in Afghanistan. During the Sparks Middle School shooting, he attempted to reason with the shooter, Jose Reyes, but was shot and killed.

== Early life and education ==
Landsberry was born in Birmingham, Alabama, on January 20, 1968.

Landsberry attended McQueen High School in Reno and lettered four consecutive years in swimming, soccer and cross country before graduating in 1986. After graduating, he enlisted in the Marine Corps. In 1996, he graduated from Truckee Meadows Community College with an associate degree in criminal justice and law enforcement. In 2000, he received a bachelor's degree in elementary education from the University of Nevada, Reno. He received a master's degree in education administration and supervision from the University of Phoenix in 2005.

== Military career ==
After graduating high school, Landsberry enlisted in the United States Marine Corps. Later, in 2001, Landsberry enlisted in the Nevada Air National Guard and was assigned to the Aerial Port Flight. In March 2006, Landsberry deployed to Camp Arifjan, Kuwait, and performed duties as an airlift validator for the Central Command Deployment and Distribution Center. In May 2011, he deployed again to Bagram Airfield, Afghanistan, where he performed air transportation functions for the 455th Expeditionary Aerial Port Squadron. He attained the rank of corporal and served as a field wireman before eventually being promoted to master sergeant.

=== Awards ===
His military awards include: the Air Force Commendation Medal, the Joint Service Achievement Medal, the Air Force Achievement Medal, the Navy Achievement Medal, the Air Force Outstanding Unit Award, the Good Conduct Medal, the Reserve Good Conduct Medal, the National Defense Service Medal, the Afghanistan Campaign Medal, the Global War on Terrorism Expeditionary Medal, the Global War on Terrorism Service Medal, the Sea Service Ribbon, the Air Force Expeditionary Service Ribbon, the Navy Arctic Service Ribbon, the Air Force Longevity Service Award, the Armed Forces Reserve Medal, the NATO Medal, the Nevada State Commendation Medal, the Nevada Humanitarian Service Ribbon, the Nevada Air National Guard Overseas Deployment Ribbon, the Nevada Meritorious Service Ribbon and the Nevada Guard Service Ribbon. He was posthumously awarded the Airman's Medal and the National Guard Association's Valley Forge Cross for Heroism.

== Teaching career ==
Landsberry began working for the Washoe County School District in 2001. For four years, he taught history, math, and science at Trainer Middle School. He was also a teacher at Greenbrae Elementary School for a year in 2006, and in that same year, he started teaching math at Sparks Middle School. Throughout his tenure as a teacher, Landsberry coached middle school basketball, cross country, track, volleyball as well as high school soccer.

== Murder ==
On October 21, 2013, Jose Reyes opened fire on the school's campus with a 9mm semiautomatic handgun and injured two students. Landsberry told his students to find cover, telling them "Get to a safe place. Something really bad might happen." He then attempted to talk Reyes down, saying, "Put it down. It's not worth it." Reyes shot Landsberry in the chest before killing himself.

== Legacy ==
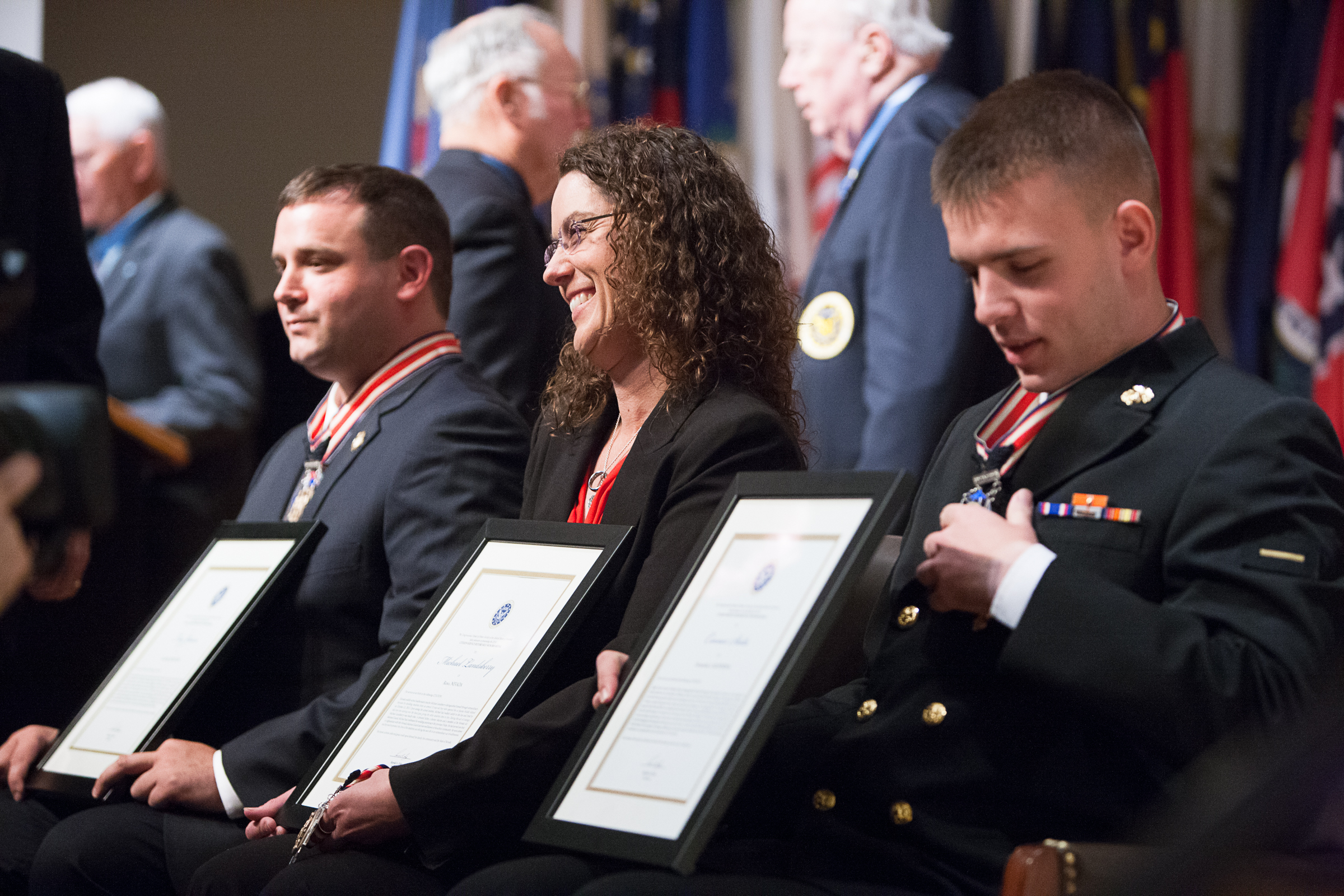
Sharon Landsberry during the Citizen Honors Ceremony at the Women in Military Service for America Memorial March 25, 2014, in Arlington, Va. Landsberry received the Citizen Service Before Self medal for her late husband Michael.

In 2013, the Reno Gazette-Journal recognized Landsberry by posthumously awarding him with the Citizen of the Year award. It is awarded based on nominations and submissions in 2013 were overwhelmingly for him.

The Washoe Education Association started a scholarship named "The Michael Landsberry Memorial Scholarship". It is awarded to a high school senior who plans on attending a 2–4 year college or vocational school.

During his concert in Incline Village, Billy Ray Cyrus presented a memorial plaque to Landsberry's widow, Sharon, on July 5, 2014.

The United States Air Force posthumously awarded the Airman's Medal to Landsberry and the National Guard Association of the United States awarded him with the Valley Forge Cross for Heroism.

== Personal life ==
Landsberry is survived by his wife, Sharon Landsberry, along with his two stepdaughters. In 2015, Sharon won a settlement of $100,000 from the Washoe County School District for the death of her husband. She also received $44,000 for the 148 sick days accrued by her husband.
