= Breslow =

Breslow may refer to:

- Bruce Breslow (born 1956), American businessman and politician
- Craig Breslow (born 1980), American Major League Baseball pitcher and executive
- Jan Breslow (born 1943), American physician and medical researcher
- Lester Breslow (1915–2012), American physician and public health specialist
- Lou Breslow (1900–1987), American screenwriter and film director
- Marc Breslow (1925–2015), American television director
- Norman Breslow (1941–2015), American statistician and medical researcher
- Ronald Breslow (1931–2017), American chemist
- Ryan Breslow (born 1994), American businessman

== See also ==
- Breslow's depth, prognostic factor in melanoma of the skin
