= J. J. Milan =

American football player (born 1984)

Profile
- Position: Defensive end

Personal information
- Born: August 11, 1984 (age 42); Reno, Nevada, U.S.
- Listed height: 6 ft 5 in (1.96 m)
- Listed weight: 265 lb (120 kg)

Career information
- College: Nevada
- NFL draft: 2007: undrafted

Career history
- Oakland Raiders (2007)*; Indianapolis Colts (2007–2008)*; Chicago Bears (2009)*
- * Offseason or practice squad member only

Awards and highlights
- First-team All-WAC (2006)

J. J. Milan (born August 11, 1984) is an American former football defensive end. He was signed by the Oakland Raiders as an undrafted free agent in 2007. He played college football at Nevada.

Milan was also a member of the Indianapolis Colts and Chicago Bears.

== Early life ==
Milan played high school football for Earl Wooster High School in Reno.

== Professional career ==
=== Oakland Raiders ===
He signed with the Oakland Raiders of the National Football League in 2007 but was waived on August 3, 2007.

=== Indianapolis Colts ===
On August 7, 2007, Milan was claimed off waivers by the Indianapolis Colts. He failed to report to the team and was placed on the reserve/did not report list two days later, where he would spend the entire 2007 season. He was reinstated to the team's active roster on April 14, 2008. On June 6, 2008, Milan was waived/injured by the team, cleared waivers, and was placed on injured reserve on June 11, 2008.

=== Chicago Bears ===
Milan signed with the Chicago Bears on August 11, 2009. He was waived on August 31.
