= Anthony Corley =

American football player (born 1960)

No. 40, 31
- Position: Running back

Personal information
- Born: August 10, 1960 (age 66); Reno, Nevada
- Listed height: 6 ft 0 in (1.83 m)
- Listed weight: 210 lb (95 kg)

Career information
- High school: Hug (Sparks, Nevada)
- College: UNLV
- NFL draft: 1984: undrafted

Career history
- Pittsburgh Steelers (1984); San Diego Chargers (1985)

Career NFL statistics
- Games played: 18
- Stats at Pro Football Reference

Anthony George Corley (born August 10, 1960) is an American former professional football player who was a running back for two seasons in the National Football League with the Pittsburgh Steelers in 1984 and the San Diego Chargers in 1985, appearing in a total of 18 career games. He played college football for the UNLV Rebels.
