= Mount Rose K–8 School =

- Mount Rose K-8 School (listed as Mount Rose Elementary School)
- U.S. National Register of Historic Places
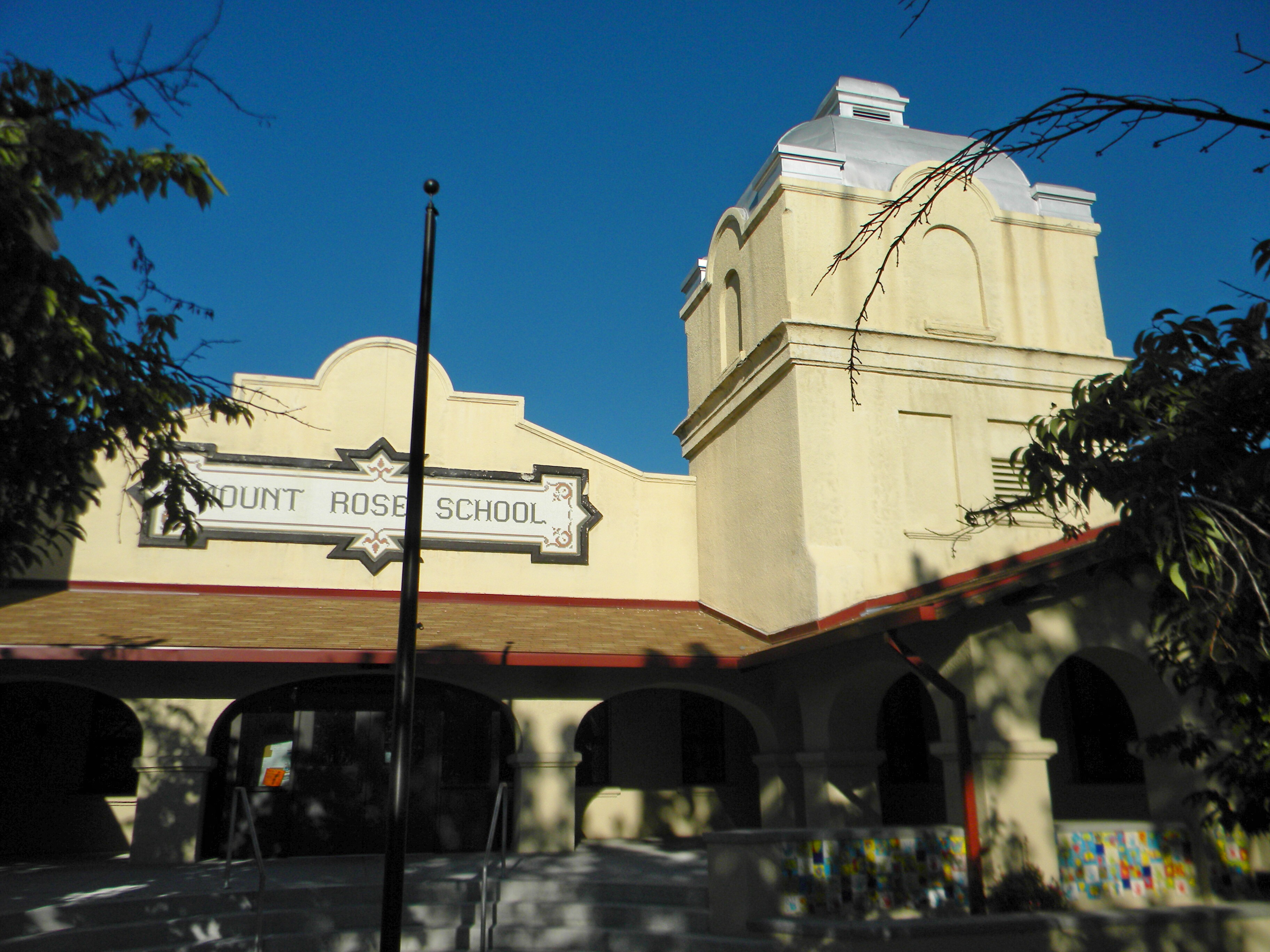

- Location within Nevada Location within the United States
- Location: 915 Lander St., Reno, Nevada
- Coordinates: 39°30′55″N 119°48′57″W
- Area: 3.3 acres (1.3 ha)
- Built: 1912
- Architectural style: Mission/Spanish Revival
- NRHP reference No.: 77000841
- Added to NRHP: November 25, 1977

Mount Rose K-8 School of Languages, formerly Mount Rose Elementary School, is a public K-8 school at 915 Lander St. in Reno, Nevada, operated by the Washoe County School District. It occupies a historic Mission/Spanish Revival-style facility that was built in 1912 and extended in 1938. It was listed on the National Register of Historic Places in 1977 under the name Mount Rose Elementary.

The school is "a rare example" of Mission Revival style surviving in the Reno area.

Some students zoned to Mount Rose are also zoned to Swope Middle School and Reno High School. Others are zoned to Clayton Middle School or Vaughn Middle School and Earl Wooster High School.
