= Wooster High School =

Wooster High School may refer to:

- Earl Wooster High School, Reno, Nevada, United States
- Wooster High School (Ohio), Wooster, United States
