= Carson McCusker =

American baseball player (born 1998)

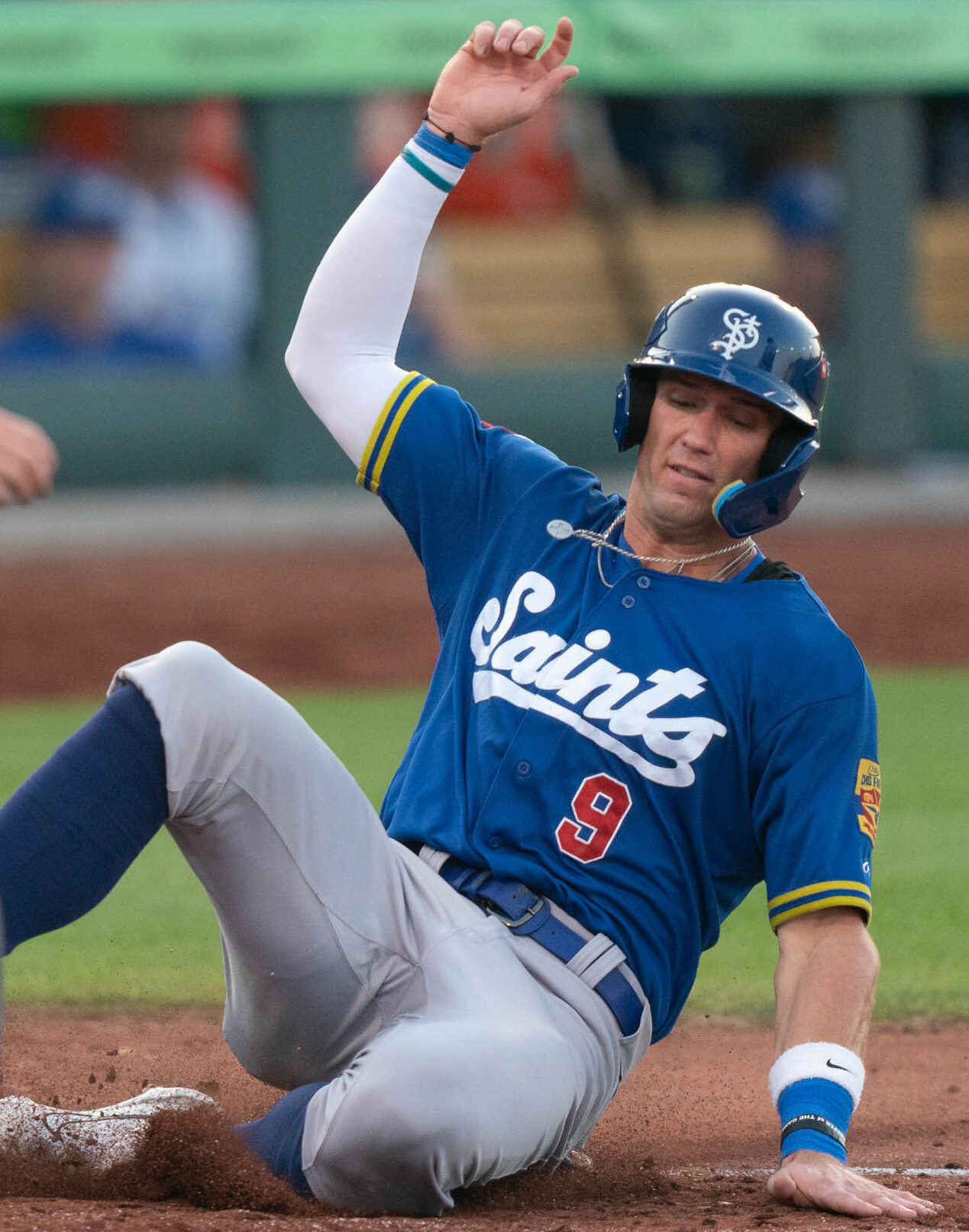
- McCusker with the St. Paul Saints in 2025

Tohoku Rakuten Golden Eagles – No. 34
- Outfielder
- Born: May 22, 1998 (age 28); Sparks, Nevada, U.S.
- Bats: Right Throws: Right

Professional debut
- MLB: May 18, 2025, for the Minnesota Twins
- NPB: March 27, 2026, for the Tohoku Rakuten Golden Eagles

MLB statistics (through 2025 season)
- Batting average: .172
- Home runs: 0
- Runs batted in: 1

NPB statistics (through August 21, 2026)
- Batting average: .262
- Home runs: 18
- Runs batted in: 51
- Stats at Baseball Reference

Teams
- Minnesota Twins (2025); Tohoku Rakuten Golden Eagles (2026–present)

Carson Michael McCusker (born May 22, 1998) is an American professional baseball outfielder for the Tohoku Rakuten Golden Eagles of Nippon Professional Baseball (NPB). He has previously played in Major League Baseball (MLB) for the Minnesota Twins.

== Career ==
=== Minnesota Twins ===
McCusker attended Spanish Springs High School in Sparks, Nevada. He started his college baseball career at Folsom Lake College. After one year at Folsom Lake, he was selected by the Milwaukee Brewers in the 2017 Major League Baseball draft. He did not sign with the Brewers and transferred to play at Oklahoma State University. After four years at Oklahoma State, McCusker went unselected in the 2021 MLB draft and signed with the Tri-City Valley Cats of the Frontier League; he would play in 31 games for the team, hitting .324 with six home runs and 23 RBI. McCusker made 77 appearances for the Valley Cats during the 2022 season, slashing .265/.320/.502 with 13 home runs, 46 RBI, and five stolen bases.

McCusker started 2023 with Tri-City and signed with the Minnesota Twins on June 29, 2023. He played that season with the Fort Myers Mighty Mussels and Cedar Rapids Kernels. He started 2024 with the Wichita Wind Surge before his promotion to the St. Paul Saints and started 2025 with St. Paul. In April 2025, he was named the Twins minor league player of the month.

On May 18, 2025, McCusker was promoted to the major leagues for the first time. He returned to the Saints ten days later. McCusker was promoted once again on August 9, to fill Matt Wallner's spot on the Twins roster as Wallner was on paternity leave, and returned to St. Paul on August 11. In 16 appearances for the Twins during his rookie campaign, McCusker went 5-for-29 (.172) with one RBI and one walk. On December 10, the Twins released McCusker to allow him to pursue an opportunity in Asia.

=== Tohoku Rakuten Golden Eagles ===
On December 13, 2025, McCusker signed with the Tohoku Rakuten Golden Eagles of Nippon Professional Baseball.
