= Chris Aguila =

Filipino American baseball player (born 1979)

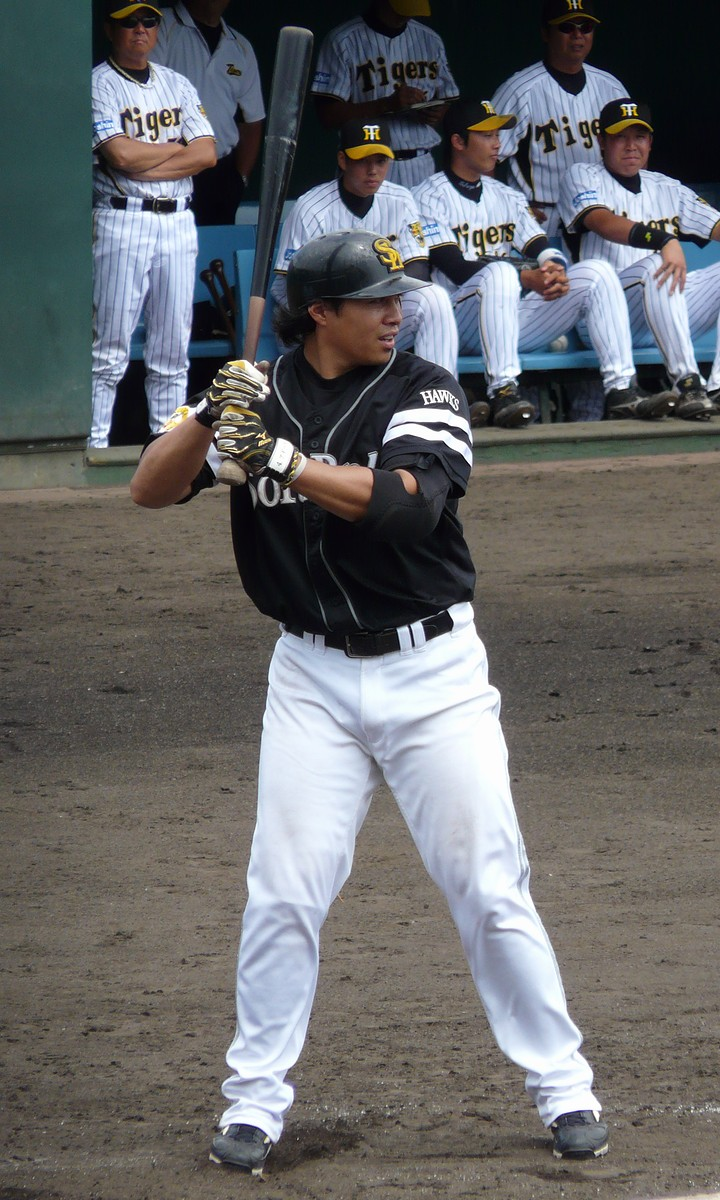
- Aguila in 2009
- Outfielder
- Born: February 23, 1979 (age 47); Redwood City, California, U.S.
- Batted: Right Threw: Right

Professional debut
- MLB: June 28, 2004, for the Florida Marlins
- NPB: April 3, 2009, for the Fukuoka SoftBank Hawks

Last appearance
- MLB: July 10, 2008, for the New York Mets
- NPB: May 20, 2009, for the Fukuoka SoftBank Hawks

MLB statistics
- Batting average: .230
- Home runs: 3
- Runs batted in: 16

NPB statistics
- Batting average: .095
- Home runs: 0
- Runs batted in: 0
- Stats at Baseball Reference

Teams
- Florida Marlins (2004–2006); New York Mets (2008); Fukuoka SoftBank Hawks (2009)

Christopher Louis Aguila (born February 23, 1979) is a Filipino American former Major League Baseball outfielder. He played parts of three seasons in the majors with the Florida Marlins (2004–2006) and part of the 2008 season with the New York Mets. He plays all three outfield positions.

== Early life ==
Aguila was born to a Filipino father and a mother of Samoan, Tongan, and Fijian descent. He played high school baseball for McQueen High School in Reno, Nevada, where he set a single-season home run record. As a senior, he was a first-team High School All-American as a designated hitter.

== Professional baseball career ==
=== Florida Marlins ===
The Florida Marlins selected Aguila as a third baseman in the third round of the 1997 MLB draft out of McQueen High School in Reno, Nevada; he had set a single-season home run record while at McQueen. Although he was initially a highly regarded prospect, he spent two seasons playing rookie ball in the Gulf Coast League and 2½ more seasons in Single-A before he was promoted to the Double-A Portland Sea Dogs. He became an outfielder during the 1999 season, when he played for the Kane County Cougars. When he started playing for Portland in 2001, he was in his fifth professional season, but was still only 22 years old. He batted .257 in 64 games with Portland. He returned to the Sea Dogs in 2002 and posted a .294 average. The Marlins switched their Double-A affiliation to the Carolina Mudcats the following year, and Aguila spent 2003 with the Mudcats, posting a .320 batting average in 93 games. It was then that Aguila once again showed his potential as a hitter, and the Marlins would invite him to their spring training in 2004.

Although Aguila did not make the Marlins' opening day roster in 2004, he impressed Marlins manager Jack McKeon, and he batted .312 for Triple-A Albuquerque. He had two stints in the Majors in 2004, paving the way for him to make the Marlins' opening day roster in 2005.

In 2005, Aguila was named the Marlins' fifth outfielder (behind Miguel Cabrera, Juan Pierre, Juan Encarnación, and Jeff Conine), but was used mainly in a pinch-hitting role. He logged only 16 at bats in the first two months of the season, and he was sent back to Albuquerque on May 27. While in Albuquerque, he regained his everyday role as the team's center fielder. He batted .351 with 7 home runs and 25 RBI in 35 games with Albuquerque, and he was promoted back to the Major Leagues on July 7, when the Marlins placed Josh Willingham on the disabled list. He spent the rest of the season in the Major Leagues, mainly as a pinch hitter; he started only 12 games all year, most of them while Encarnación was injured. He finished the 2005 season with a .244 batting average, no home runs, and 4 RBI in 78 at bats. Following the 2005 season, he played for Gigantes del Cibao in the Dominican Winter League.

Several signs pointed to Aguila's receiving more playing time in 2006. Toward the end of the season, teammate A. J. Burnett ripped Marlins manager Jack McKeon for several reasons, one of which was that McKeon gave most of the available playing time to aging veterans, rather than to younger players such as Aguila, Willingham, and Jeremy Hermida, who had proven themselves already in the minor leagues, but had not received extended playing time in the Majors. Also, Encarnación became a free agent following the 2005 season, and Juan Pierre was traded to the Chicago Cubs, so Aguila was put in a position to compete for a starting job in the Marlins' outfield in 2006. In addition, McKeon retired after the last game of the 2005 season, and the Marlins named 41-year-old Joe Girardi as his replacement.

Aguila made the Marlins' opening-day roster again in 2006. While Hermida was sidelined, Aguila got most of the at bats in right field until the Marlins signed Joe Borchard; afterwards, Aguila was part of a platoon in center field with Eric Reed and Reggie Abercrombie. (Although Willingham occasionally started at catcher, he started most of the Marlins' games in left field) Reed struggled, going 4-for-35 (.114) at the plate, and was sent down to Albuquerque. Meanwhile, Abercrombie went on an 11-game hitting streak, which further decreased the amount of playing time Aguila was receiving; Aguila started in only three of the club's next 16 games after May 3. On May 26, the Marlins acquired Cody Ross from the Cincinnati Reds for a player to be named later; to free a roster spot for Ross, they optioned Aguila to Albuquerque. During his time with the Marlins up to that point, he had batted .229 (19-for-83) with two stolen bases, seven doubles, a triple, no home runs, and seven RBI. In 13 games with Albuquerque, he batted .383 (18-for-47) with one home run (a grand slam) and drove in 13 runs, before he was recalled by the Marlins to replace Willingham, who had gone on the disabled list. After a second stint with the Marlins, he returned to Albuquerque for the rest of the Isotopes' season, where he finished the year there with a .318 batting average, 11 home runs, and 59 RBI in 77 games. After the Isotopes' season ended, the Marlins placed him back on their Major League roster. He appeared in eight games with the Marlins in September, batting 3-for-9 to raise his batting average for the year to .232. He did not start any more games for the Marlins in 2006 after returning to the majors, but he did hit 2-for-3 with a single and a double in their season-ending win against the Philadelphia Phillies. On October 13, 2006, the Marlins outrighted Aguila to Albuquerque, which removed him from their 40-man roster. Since he was out of options on his contract, he needed to make the Marlins' opening day roster in 2007 in order to remain in their organization for a 10th season.

=== Pittsburgh Pirates ===
Instead of remaining with the Marlins, he signed a minor league contract with the Pittsburgh Pirates on December 10, 2006, with an invitation to spring training. He joined the Pirates in spring training as a non-roster invitee, but did not make the team out of camp; and played for their Triple-A club, the Indianapolis Indians, where he hit (.250/.291/.360/651 in 172 at bats).

=== New York Mets ===
Aguila was signed by the New York Mets in March 2008, and he was assigned to their Triple-A team, New Orleans Zephyrs. On June 11, Aguila was called up from Triple-A New Orleans to the Major League team to replace Abraham Núñez who was designated for assignment, but he too was designated for assignment after appearing in only three games. On July 11 Aguila was again designated for assignment, and on July 15 he was sent outright to the minors.

=== Fukuoka SoftBank Hawks ===
He became a minor league free agent at the end of the season and was signed by the Fukuoka SoftBank Hawks.

=== Toronto Blue Jays/Philadelphia Phillies ===
He signed as a free agent with the Toronto Blue Jays on March 15, 2010, but after 44 games with the Las Vegas 51s, he was traded to the Philadelphia Phillies.

=== Florida/Miami Marlins ===
He rejoined the Marlins organization as a free agent on August 26, 2010. In 2011 and 2012, he played for the New Orleans Zephyrs in the Marlins system.

=== Fortitudo Baseball Bologna ===
He signed with Fortitudo Baseball Bologna of the Italian Baseball League in 2013.
