= Edward C. Reed High School =

Location
- 1350 Baring Blvd; Sparks, Nevada 89434; United States; 39.5578°N 119.7201°W

Information
- Type: Public
- Motto: Learning is a lifelong process
- Established: Winter, 1974
- Principal: Josh Rosenbloom
- Faculty: 128
- Teaching staff: 82.40 (FTE)
- Grades: 9-12
- Enrollment: 2,119 (2023-2024)
- Student to teacher ratio: 25.72
- Colors: Blue and gold
- Mascot: Raider
- Rival: Spanish Springs High School
- Website: www.washoeschools.net/reed

Edward C. Reed High School is a public secondary school in Sparks, Nevada and is one of three public high schools run by the Washoe County School District within the city of Sparks. The school was founded in the winter of 1974 to accommodate the growing population of students at Sparks High School's campus.

== History ==
Edward C. Reed High School is named after Judge Edward C. Reed, Jr., a Senior United States District Judge for the District of Nevada. Before being appointed to the bench in 1979, Judge Reed was a Washoe County School Board Member from 1956 to 1959, and President of the School Board from 1959 to 1977.

1976 was the first graduating class for Reed High. Sparks High School had a large influx of students prior to the opening of Reed High, that the school ran three shifts of students, with Seniors and Junior arriving for First period, Sophomores for Second Period, and Freshman arriving for Third Period.

While the school was being built, the district held a vote of future students on what to name the school. Although students decided that the alliteration of Reed Raiders sounded best, the Reed Conquistadors was also a popular choice - garnering the second most votes.

As of 2025, a current expansion project is beginning, with it expected to be finished by somewhere in 2027.

== Academics ==
As of the 2014–2015 school year, Edward C. Reed High School was unranked in the U.S. News & World Report national rankings of the best high schools. The school's Advanced Placement (AP) participation was 45%, with a 54% pass rate. The school exceeded both district and state average scores in subject proficiency in both English and mathematics. As of 2015–2016, the school's test scores were very slightly above the state average in all subjects, but not significantly so. AP participation had fallen to 19%, and SAT/ACT participation was at 32%. The average graduation rate was 81%. The average class size was 28.

== Athletics ==
Reed High School has a rich history in athletics winning numerous zone and state titles. The Raiders play in the High Desert League of the Northern Nevada 4A Region (large school).

=== Football ===
The first Football Division Championship came in 1983 with the school's first undefeated 8–0 regular season as a northern 3A school (the highest league at the time). The year was capped off by two playoff wins (The first year of the playoff system) over perennial champions (Reno and Wooster) and a loss in the state championship game to Gorman 14–12 (11–1). It was also the first time a team from the North was represented in the title game by a team other than Reno or Wooster in more than 20 years. That team, 36 players strong, saw eight seniors receive football scholarships from Division 1 through JC schools. It was the beginning of a long winning tradition in football. Most notably kicker Mike Biselli who still holds the record for longest FG made 67 yards. He went on to become a three-year starter for the Stanford Cardinal. In 2004 the Reed Raiders defeated the McQueen Lancers 21–13 for their second Regional Championship, only to lose to Las Vegas High school in the first round of the state championship playoff.

=== Cross Country ===
Northern Nevada Championship Streak

During the 2011 season the Reed Raiders were league champions and state runner up to Bishop Gorman of Las Vegas. Reed defeated Carson 49–0 to win the North. During the 2012 season the Reed Raiders were league champions and Northern Nevada regional champions defeating Damonte Ranch 50–9. During the 2013 season the Reed Raiders captured their third straight Northern Nevada regional championship defeating Carson 47–39. Reed also won their league and finished as the state runner up. During the 2014 season the Reed Raiders won their fourth straight Northern Nevada regional championship defeating Carson 28–25. Reed again also won their league and finished as the state runner up. During the 2015 season the Reed Raiders won their fifth straight Northern Nevada regional championship defeating Carson 56–28, with Reed once again won their league and finished as the state runner up.

Through the 2017 season Reed has won four straight Northern Nevada championships and six of the last seven, with the Damonte Ranch Mustangs 49–45 upsetting the Raiders and ending the 5-year streak.

The 2017 season had all but one coach leave the program for Bishop Manaogue; 18 coaches had to be replaced. Anthony Amantia was hired. Even with this, Reed was again Region Champs in 2017, first knocking off undefeated Damonte Ranch (31–27), then undefeated Reno (24–21), before losing to Bishop Gorman in State (7–48).

=== Soccer ===
The girls soccer team have won the Northern state championship in 2006, 2007, 2008 coached by Jason Saville and Steve Asher. In 2008, High Desert League coaches recognized eight of Reed's starting 11 in the postseason all-league awards.

=== Nevada Interscholastic Activities Association State Championships ===
- Basketball (Girls) - 1991, 1992, 1993, 2012
- Cross Country (Girls) - 1984, 1985, 1987, 1988, 1993, 1994
- Cross Country (Boys) - 1982, 1993
- Soccer (Girls) - 2006, 2007, 2008
- Soccer (Boys) - 2000
- Golf (Girls) - 1977, 1991
- Softball - 1978, 1979, 1981, 1988, 1989, 1990, 1995, 1998, 2015
- Track/Field (Girls) - 1988, 1990, 1991, 1992, 1993, 1994, 1996, 1997, 1998, 1999
- Track/Field (Boys) - 1998, 1996

== Arts & music ==
The Reed High School Winter Drumline won a Northern California Band Association Championship in 2004. The Reed High School Marching Band won the Governors Cup in 2007 and again in 2009.

The Raider Band has represented the City of Sparks and WCSD in the 2020 London New Year Parade, 2024 Rome New Years Parade and several times in Hawaii at Pearl Harbor.

The Edward C. Reed HS Performing Arts is the largest program in Northern Nevada (as of 2025).

== Areas served ==
In addition to Sparks, the school serves Wadsworth as areas zoned to Wadsworth's school, Natchez Elementary, are zoned to Reed.

== We The People ==
Reed High School participates in the We The People program, put on for the Center for Civic Education.

In 2008, the Reed High School team won the state competition, and represented Nevada at the national competition. and in 2009, the Reed High School We the People class represented the state of Nevada at nationals and received the Unit One Award. Reed High School also won state again in 2011

In 2015 Reed High won the state competition and placed in the top 10 nationally and 7th overall. The testimony given by the Top Ten competing schools was done on Capitol Hill.

In 2018 Reed High took third place at the district competition and became one of three teams to represent northern Nevada at the state competition in February 2019.

On December 14, 2019, Reed High took first place at the district competition at the University of Nevada, Reno, and became one of three teams to represent northern Nevada at the state competition in February 2020 at the University of Nevada, Las Vegas. At the state competition, the Raiders placed third, disqualifying the team from advancing to the national competition in Washington, D.C.

== Notable alumni ==
- Perris Benegas, freestyle BMX cyclist and Olympic medalist
- Austin Corbett, professional Men's football player
- Chris Fogel, Emmy and Grammy-winning recording engineer
- Jesse Haw, politician
- Becky Holliday, track and field athlete
- Jake McGee, professional baseball player
- Elijah Tau-Tolliver, NFL running back for the Baltimore Ravens
- Gabby Williams, professional women's basketball player
