= 2013 Sparks Middle School shooting =

School shooting in Nevada, U.S.

- Location: 39°33′6″N 119°46′6″W; Sparks Middle School, Sparks, Nevada, U.S.
- Date: October 21, 2013; 13 years ago
- Attack type: School shooting, murder–suicide
- Weapon: Ruger SR9C 9mm semi-automatic pistol
- Deaths: 2 (Landsberry and the perpetrator)
- Injuries: 2
- Perpetrator: Jose Horacio Reyes
- Defender: Michael Landsberry
- Motive: Revenge for bullying

The 2013 Sparks Middle School shooting occurred on October 21, 2013, at Sparks Middle School in Sparks, Nevada, United States. 12-year-old Jose Horacio Reyes shot and injured two students and killed a teacher before committing suicide. Sparks Middle School is part of the Washoe County School District.

== Shooting ==
List of victims

Killed:
  - Michael Landsberry, 45, teacher

Wounded:

- K.J. Kersey, 12, student
- Mason Davis, 12, student

On October 21, 2013, Jose Reyes, a 12-year-old student in seventh grade, opened fire with a handgun at the basketball courts of Sparks Middle School. He injured a 12-year-old student, KJ Kersey, in the shoulder. Michael Landsberry, a 45-year-old math teacher who was trying to intervene with Reyes, was shot and killed in the playground. Reyes proceeded to fire two shots at teacher Mr. Perez, missing both, and then shot and wounded a 12-year-old student, Mason Davis, who tried to come to Landsberry's assistance. Davis suffered an injury to his abdomen. Reyes then committed suicide by shooting himself in the head. He had two magazines, one with 17 rounds, and another with 10 rounds, although neither were filled to capacity. The shooting happened before classes, and the school was evacuated and was closed for the week. Details of the shooting emerged in the report issued the following spring.

== Perpetrator ==
Jose Horacio Reyes (July 2, 2001 – October 21, 2013), was born in Reno, Nevada, to parents from Mexico. He had two younger sisters, and grew up partially in Arizona where his father found a construction job, but later moved with his family back to Nevada. Reyes's parents owned a restaurant in Sparks. In early 2012, Reyes's father was charged with and pleaded guilty to misdemeanor child abuse for an incident involving his son. Reyes left two suicide notes claiming he was bullied, and had taken the antidepressant Prozac and an antipsychotic drug.

== Aftermath ==
The incident has been a continuing subject of public concern and discussion. In November 2015, Hillary Clinton discussed the shooting at Sparks during her campaign for the presidency, as part of her campaign for gun control.

== See also ==
- List of school shootings in the United States by death toll
- List of homicides in Nevada
