= List of mayors of Sparks, Nevada =

Mayors of the city of Sparks, Nevada, USA

The following is a list of mayors of the city of Sparks, Nevada, United States.

== Mayors ==
- D. J. Fodrin, ca.1953
- H. Seth Burgess, ca.1954
- Bruce Breslow, 1990–1998
- Tony Armstrong, 1999–2005
- Geno Martini, 2005–2018
- Ron Smith, ca.2020
- Ed Lawson, 2020–present

Recent Mayors (1990–Present)

This period, after 1990s, reflects Sparks’ quick suburban expansion and integration into the Reno metropolitan area.

List of Mayors in that period:

- Bruce H. Breslow (1990–1999)
  - Later became Nevada’s Insurance Commissioner
- Tony Armstrong (1999–2005)
- Geno Martini (2005–2018)
  - Longest-serving modern mayor
  - He is known for major redevelopment of downtown Sparks and Victorian Square
- Ronald (Ron) C. Smith (2018–2020)
  - Main focus on regional transportation planning
  - Died in the office in 2020, at age 71
- Ed Lawson (2020–present, as of 2026)
  - Former city council member (since 2010)
  - Took office after Ron Smith’s death
  - Re-elected in 2022
  - Focus on economic growth and infrastructure

== See also ==
- Sparks history
