= Academy of Arts, Careers and Technology =

Public magnet school in Reno, Nevada, United States

Location
- 380 Edison Way; Reno, Nevada 89502; United States
- Coordinates: 39.5063°N 119.7548°W

Information
- Type: Public magnet school
- Motto: We Serve. We Integrate. We Succeed.
- Established: 2009
- School district: Washoe County School District
- NCES District ID: 3200480
- Principal: Jason Mattick
- Staff: 28.70 (FTE)
- Enrollment: 530 (2022–23)
- Student to teacher ratio: 18.47
- Colors: Grey and Maroon
- Mascot: Trailblazer (formerly a Phoenix)
- Rival: Earl Wooster High School
- Website: https://www.washoeschools.net/aact

The Academy of Arts, Careers and Technology (AACT) is a career-tech high school in Reno, Nevada founded in 2009 as a part of the Washoe County School District. According to the U.S. News & World Report, it is the seventh-best high school in Nevada.

AACT is the first high school in Northern Nevada to offer an aviation program. The program uses a facility featuring air traffic control and flight simulators funded by a $1.09 million donation from the Gillemot Foundation. In coordination with the Bureau of Land Management the school also offers a four-year firefighting program.

AACT currently offers seven career and technical education (CTE) programs. In addition to Aviation and Fire Science, academies for Criminal Justice, Communication Arts and Media, Business, Medical, and Culinary are offered.

AACT features an embedded EMT education program with REMSA Health, Reno-Sparks' ground medical transport franchisee which is headquartered next door. Graduates of the program are qualified to be hired as EMTs with REMSA Health following graduation.

In 2018 Maren Oates, a Communications teacher at the AACT, was charged with engaging in sex with a student. She was placed on administrative leave, pleaded guilty, and was sentenced to 12–34 months in prison.
