= Bruce Breslow =

American businessman and politician

22nd Mayor of Sparks, Nevada
- In office November 12, 1990 – November 9, 1998
- Succeeded by: Tony Armstrong

Personal details
- Born: Bruce H. Breslow; February 2, 1956 (age 70) Sparks, Nevada, U.S.
- Party: Democratic; Republican
- Education: University of Missouri
- Profession: Businessman and politician

Bruce H. Breslow (born February 2, 1956) is an American businessman and politician. He retired as a Commissioner on the Public Utilities Commission of Nevada (PUCN) on October 5, 2018. He was appointed to this position on September 5, 2017 by Governor Brian Sandoval. Breslow previously served as the director of the Department of Business and Industry for the state of Nevada. He was appointed to this position in November 2012 by Governor Brian Sandoval and was the longest-serving director to date. As the director of the Department of Business and Industry, he oversaw 13 state regulatory and administrative divisions which include Athletic Commission, Dairy Commission, Insurance, Employee Management Relations Board, Manufactured Housing, Financial Institutions, Mortgage Lending, Housing, Labor, Industrial Relations, Transportation Authority, Injured Workers, Business Finance and Planning, Real Estate Division and the Taxicab Authority.

Previously, Breslow served as the director of the Department of Motor Vehicles where he focused on innovative ways to enhance the customer's experience. Prior to this appointment, he served as the executive director of the Nevada's Agency for Nuclear Projects. Previously, Breslow served two terms as the 22nd Mayor of Sparks, Nevada from 1991 to 1999.

== Career ==
In 1991, Breslow was elected Mayor of Sparks, Nevada. He was re-elected in 1995 and served until 1999. In 1999, Nevada Governor Kenny Guinn appointed Breslow a commissioner of the Transportation Services Authority and chairman of the Employee Management Committee. During his time as Commissioner, he was trained as an administrative law judge at the National Judicial College, specializing in arbitration and mediation.

Breslow was elected a member of the Nevada Broadcasting Hall of Fame in 1998 after many years as a local television sports anchor. During the past nine Summer Olympic Games, he has been the broadcast voice of men's and women's basketball, volleyball and boxing, broadcasting to more than 120 countries worldwide in a network that has become the IOC World Feed, now known as the Olympic Broadcasting Service.

Breslow was a founding member of Commercial Partners of Nevada and prior to that was a Vice-President of CB Richard Ellis. He has also co-owned a prominent advertising agency which specialized in re-branding area casinos and golf communities.

Breslow graduated with a bachelor of journalism degree from the University of Missouri. Breslow also served as chairman of the board of the Reno-Sparks Convention and Visitors Authority and was a longtime member of the Regional Governing Board. He is a member of the Nevada State Bar Association Fee Dispute Resolution Committee.

In 2009, Governor Jim Gibbons (R-NV) appointed Breslow as executive director of the State of Nevada Agency for Nuclear Projects.

In 2011, Governor Brian Sandoval (R-NV) as director of the State of Nevada Department of Motor Vehicles.

In 2012, Governor Brian Sandoval appointed Breslow as director of the Department of Business and Industry.

In 2017, Governor Brian Sandoval appointed Breslow to the Nevada Public Utilities Commission.

== See also ==
- List of mayors of Sparks, Nevada
