= Moses Wood =

American basketball player (born 1999)

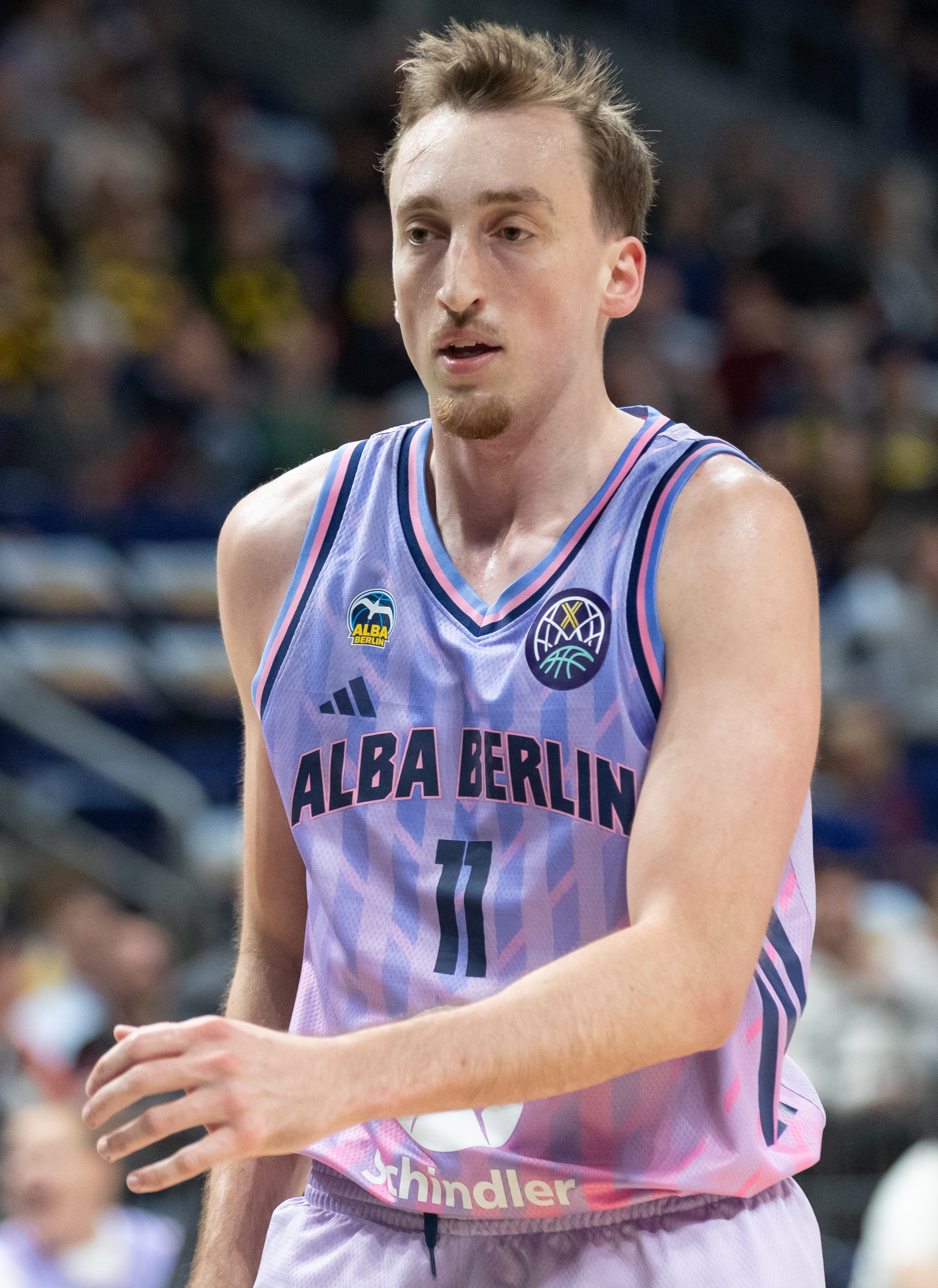
- Wood in 2025

No. 23 – Le Mans
- Position: Power forward / small forward
- League: LNB Élite; EuroCup

Personal information
- Born: May 3, 1999 (age 27) Limoges, France
- Listed height: 6 ft 8 in (2.03 m)
- Listed weight: 210 lb (95 kg)

Career information
- High school: Galena (Reno, Nevada)
- College: Tulane (2018–2019); UNLV (2020–2021); Portland (2021–2023); Washington (2023–2024)
- NBA draft: 2024: undrafted
- Playing career: 2024–present

Career history
- 2024–2025: Valley Suns
- 2025–2026: Alba Berlin
- 2026–present: Le Mans

Career highlights
- Second-team All-WCC (2023); Honorable mention All-WCC (2022)
- Stats at NBA.com
- Stats at Basketball Reference

Moses Limoges Wood (born May 3, 1999) is an American professional basketball player for Le Mans of the LNB Élite and the EuroCup. He played college basketball for the Tulane Green Wave, the UNLV Runnin' Rebels, the Portland Pilots and the Washington Huskies.

== High school career ==
Wood played at Galena High School in Reno, Nevada under head coach Brian Voyles. As a junior, he averaged 17.8 points, 7.7 rebounds and 2.3 blocks per game, leading his team to the NIAA 4A Northern Region semifinals after recording 24 points and 12 rebounds in a 74–51 win over McQueen in the regional quarterfinals. He was rated a three-star recruit and the No. 5 prospect in Nevada by ESPN.com and ranked No. 224 overall in the class of 2018 by 247Sports.com.

== College career ==
After being offered scholarships by Hofstra and Le Salle, Wood began his career at Tulane where he played in 31 games and averaged 4.5 points and 3.1 rebounds per game while shooting 37.3 percent from behind the arc and 78.4 percent from the free-throw line. Afterwards, he transferred to UNLV, where, after redshirting in his first season, averaged 6.1 points per game and 4.2 rebounds while posting one block a game.

Wood later transferred to Portland where he played two seasons and averaged 15.3 points, 6.3 rebounds, and 1.8 assists in his second season. In his last season, he transferred to Washington where he averaged 11.9 points and 4.5 rebounds in 32 games.

Throughout his career, Wood played on 152 games while averaging 10.5 points, 4.8 rebounds and 1.3 assists while shooting 44.1% from the field and 40.4% from the three-point range and finished with 1,594 points.

== Professional career ==
After going undrafted in the 2024 NBA draft, Wood joined the Atlanta Hawks for the 2024 NBA Summer League and on September 26, 2024, he signed with the Phoenix Suns on an Exhibit 10 contract. However, he was waived on October 14 and on October 27, he joined the Valley Suns. He later signed with Alba Berlin after his contract ran out.

On July 20, 2026, he signed with Le Mans of the LNB Pro A for a second stint.

== Career statistics ==
Legend
GP	Games played	GS	Games started	MPG	Minutes per game
FG%	Field goal percentage	3P%	3-point field goal percentage	FT%	Free throw percentage
RPG	Rebounds per game	APG	Assists per game	SPG	Steals per game
BPG	Blocks per game	PPG	Points per game	**Bold**	Career high

=== College ===
College Stats
Year	Team	GP	MIN	FG%	3P%	FT%	REB	AST	BLK	STL	PF	TO	PTS
2018–19	Tulane	31	18.1	39.1	37.3	78.4	3.1	0.9	0.5	0.5	2.2	0.9	4.5
2020–21	UNLV	27	22.2	43.1	36.6	83.9	4.2	0.8	**1.0**	0.5	2.3	1.0	6.1
2021–22	Portland	**33**	32.1	**47.6**	**44.2**	82.4	6.0	**1.9**	0.6	**0.8**	2.2	**2.4**	14.2
2022–23	Portland	29	**33.0**	44.9	40.3	83.9	**6.3**	1.8	0.6	0.5	**2.8**	2.0	**15.3**
2023–24	Washington	32	32.6	42.1	39.6	**87.1**	4.5	0.8	0.6	0.6	2.3	0.9	11.9

== Personal life ==
The son of David and Angela Wood, he has two older brothers and one younger one. His father played professional basketball for 15 years, including seven in the NBA.
