= Hug High School =

Procter R. Hug High School

Location
- 3530 Sullivan Lane; Sparks, Nevada 89431; United States; 39.564084°N 119.768614°W

Information
- Type: Public
- Motto: Honor Pride Spirit Loyalty
- Established: 1968
- School district: Washoe County School District
- Principal: Tristan McElhany
- Teaching staff: 97.50 (FTE)
- Grades: 9-12
- Student to teacher ratio: 20.59
- Color
- Athletics: 4A
- Athletics conference: High Desert League
- Mascot: Hawk
- Rival: North Valleys High School
- Website: hug.washoeschools.net

Procter R. Hug High School is a fully accredited public high school in Reno, Nevada, and belongs to the Washoe County School District. Hug High was built on a hillside in east Reno in 1968 to serve students from rapidly growing areas.

Like many other local schools, Hug High was named for a member of the local school board. The high school was named for Procter Hug Sr., a college athlete, teacher, athletic coach and Washoe County School Superintendent who went on after retirement to serve as a Nevada State Senator. Hug High School relocated from 2880 Sutro Street to 3530 Sullivan Lane at the beginning of the 22-23 academic year.

== History ==
Hug High's first principal, Bud Garfinkle, opened the school for the 1968-69 academic year with only sophomores and juniors; the first senior class graduated in 1970. Hug was a three year high school until the 1972-73 academic year when freshmen were admitted as all Washoe County High Schools transitioned to four year schools. As Hug was founded in the late 1960s when the U.S. was undergoing intense social change and political turmoil (especially in relation to guaranteeing equal rights to all of its citizens and fighting an increasingly unpopular war in Vietnam), the events of this period contributed to the idealism of the school's first years. In a recent letter, Garfinkle reiterates these sentiments: "I feel as if I gave birth to a child... A child born at a time when our nation was wrestling with many new ideas: that all people should be treated equally, regardless of race, color or creed." As one of the most ethnically diverse high schools in the district, it could be said that shifts in Hug's fortunes have often provided a litmus lest to the community at large as to how far it has come to achieving these ideals. At the end of the 2021-2022 academic year, principal Christina Oronoz was transferred to TMCC High School, and Interim Principal Tristan McElhany was assigned as the school's primary administrator.

Hug High School is also home to the GATE Institute, providing advanced coursework and dual-enrollment opportunities for qualified students through the district Gifted and Talented Education Program.

== Demographics ==
Enrollment peaked in the early 1970s, and again in the early 1980s. Hug High currently has an enrollment of approximately 2,331 students in grades 9-12.

Recent statistics on the ethnic origin of the student body of Hug High School (2021-2022 school year, with district-wide statistics in parentheses): American Indian/Alaska Native: 0.81% (1.26%), Asian: 3.19% (4.2%), Hispanic: 73.09% (41.78%), Black/African American: 3.75% (2.55%), White/Caucasian: 12.95% (42.59%), Pacific Islander 3.13% (1.4%), Two or More Races 3.07% (6.22%).

== Campus ==
The current campus consists of a three-story main building that houses all aspects of the school that students interact with throughout their day: administration, classrooms, and a cafeteria, among others. It utilizes a single point of access through the main office where visitors are screened before they are admitted to the building. There is a satellite building that houses equipment used for groundskeeping and maintenance to the west of the main building. Windows on the second and third floors offer views of downtown Reno, and the majority of classrooms are outward facing to allow for views of the surrounding valley and Truckee Meadows Community College to the west.

== Academics ==
Over the years, Hug has offered both a general-education and a full college-preparatory curriculum, and many of its alumni have gone on to attend some of the nation's most prestigious colleges and universities, with some earning Ph.D.'s, J.D.'s and other advanced degrees. In recent history, Principal Andrew Kelly instituted a "small schools" program, converting the A, B, and C buildings and the Gymnasium annex into semi-autonomous academic entities, in order to create a more individualized, less anonymous academic environment for students and teachers alike. He has also spoken out publicly about the racial and socioeconomic inequality still present in the Washoe County School District. More recently, Hug has received attention from the local television station KOLO for its improving academic standing as well as the introduction of gender-separate classes in its ongoing objective to boost student performance. For the 2020-21 School Year, Hug had a graduation rate of 83.89, while district averaged 85.1%.

Today Hug offers classes in English, from English as a Second Language up to Advanced Placement levels, mathematics from Algebra I to AP Calculus BC, sciences such as Biology, Chemistry and Physics, Social Studies up to Advanced Placement Levels, Spanish, French, Industrial arts and physical education, as well as numerous elective courses. In 2023, the Academic Olympics (AO) team placed 1st in Washoe County and the Science Bowl team competed in the Nevada regional competition in Las Vegas. The AO team also placed first in 2022. In 2004, the AO team placed 3rd in the district, the Science Bowl team placed 4th in the Nevada Regional, and the Robotics team placed in the top third in the Chesapeake Regional in Annapolis, Maryland.

=== GATE Institute ===
The GATE Institute at Hug High School is an opt-in service for GATE qualified 9-12th grade students in the Washoe County School District. The academic pathway for students in the institute varies wildly from the general education and honors pathways- students are encouraged to take Advanced Placement English throughout their high school career- starting with AP Literature and Composition in the 9th grade, AP English Language and Composition in the 10th grade, and culminating with AP Capstone courses in their 11th and 12th grade years. Students are also encouraged to take Advanced Placement Math courses after their 9th grade year, where they finish the district's "integrated" math track with pre-calculus & trigonometry. The program is currently headed by the Institute's site lead, Keith Roberts.

== Athletics ==
Hug competes in the High Desert League of the Northern Nevada 4A Region (large school). The campus has a lighted stadium for night games, tennis courts, a baseball field, and a softball field, also on a descending set of hillside terraces. Hug has been successful in boys' basketball, football, soccer, and boys' track this decade. The boys' basketball team won the Regional titles in 2002, 2009, 2011, and 2012; the football team was the state runner-up in 2005, along with the Northern Region championship. The soccer team won regionals and finished runner up at state in 2011. The boys' track & field team won the division, zone, and state title in 2001 with less than 30 members, one of which was team captain, senior David Butler, who went to state in four events. Many other members of the track team also had multiple events in which they all placed in the top five.

== History and student life ==
Sociopolitical background. While Hug has almost always had a higher percentage of students from ethnic minorities and low-income families than other schools in the district, since the late 1980s the student body has undergone an even more extreme demographic shift, underscoring the underlying problem of racial and economic segregation that still could be said to characterize the school district as a whole.

Academic achievements. In the 1970s and 1980s, it had a fine theater program under the direction of local actor and director Eve Loomis. Along with numerous musical, dramatic and dance performances, she founded a traveling children's theater troupe, the Hug High Harlequins, which traveled to elementary school audiences all over Northern Nevada. In the 1970s and 1980s there was also a Shakespeare Club, active in organizing yearly fieldtrips to Shakespeare performances of professional theater companies under the supervision of English teacher Joanne Walen. This group was also commonly known as "Little Willy's Gang." Hug High, along with crosstown high school partner Wooster High, co-hosted the prestigious National Association of Student Councils conference in June 1982, bringing hundreds of high school student leaders from all over the country to the Hug campus for its three-day leadership workshop. At that time, Hug was also competitive in speech and debate at the state level, and had a marching band that eventually went on to represent the state in the 1997 Presidential Inaugural Parade in Washington, DC. The march written for the occasion by Hug High marching band director Gerald Willis was called the "Silver State Fanfare," and after being played by a number of other Nevada marching bands was eventually named the Official State March by the Nevada Legislature in 2001.

Cultural diversity at Hug. Whether the Native frybread lunches of the First Americans Club and Black History Month pageants of the 1970s and 1980s (both organized under the mentorship of counselor Dolores Feemster) or the Cinco de Mayo celebrations planned by the Hug Unidos Club, and Polynesian dancing that characterize student life today, students continue to add to the history of student life at Hug through exploring and sharing their multifaceted cultural heritage with others.

Traditions. The school mascot is the Hawk. Although the school colors originally chosen by the student body were kelly green and white, the school administration later modified them in the 1980s to a darker forest green and white. The school yearbook is called the Talon, and the school newspaper is called "Soar." Its drill team, originally called the Shamrocks, is now called Hawk Havoc. The traditional school totem was the Spirit Claw, given to the class at each school assembly deemed to have shown the most school spirit.

== Notable alumni ==
- Anthony Corley, Former NFL player (San Diego Chargers)
- Bart Hendricks, Former CFL player (Edmonton Eskimos)
- Armon Johnson, Former NBA player (Portland Trail Blazers) (New Jersey Nets)
- Ray Kerr, MLB player
- Rob Richie, Former MLB player (Detroit Tigers)
- Rod Scurry, Former MLB player (Pittsburgh Pirates, New York Yankees, Seattle Mariners)
- Jo-Jo Townsell, Former NFL player (New York Jets)
- Duke Williams, Former NFL player (Buffalo Bills, Indianapolis Colts)
