= The Great Reno Balloon Race =

Hot-air balloon race held in Reno, Nevada

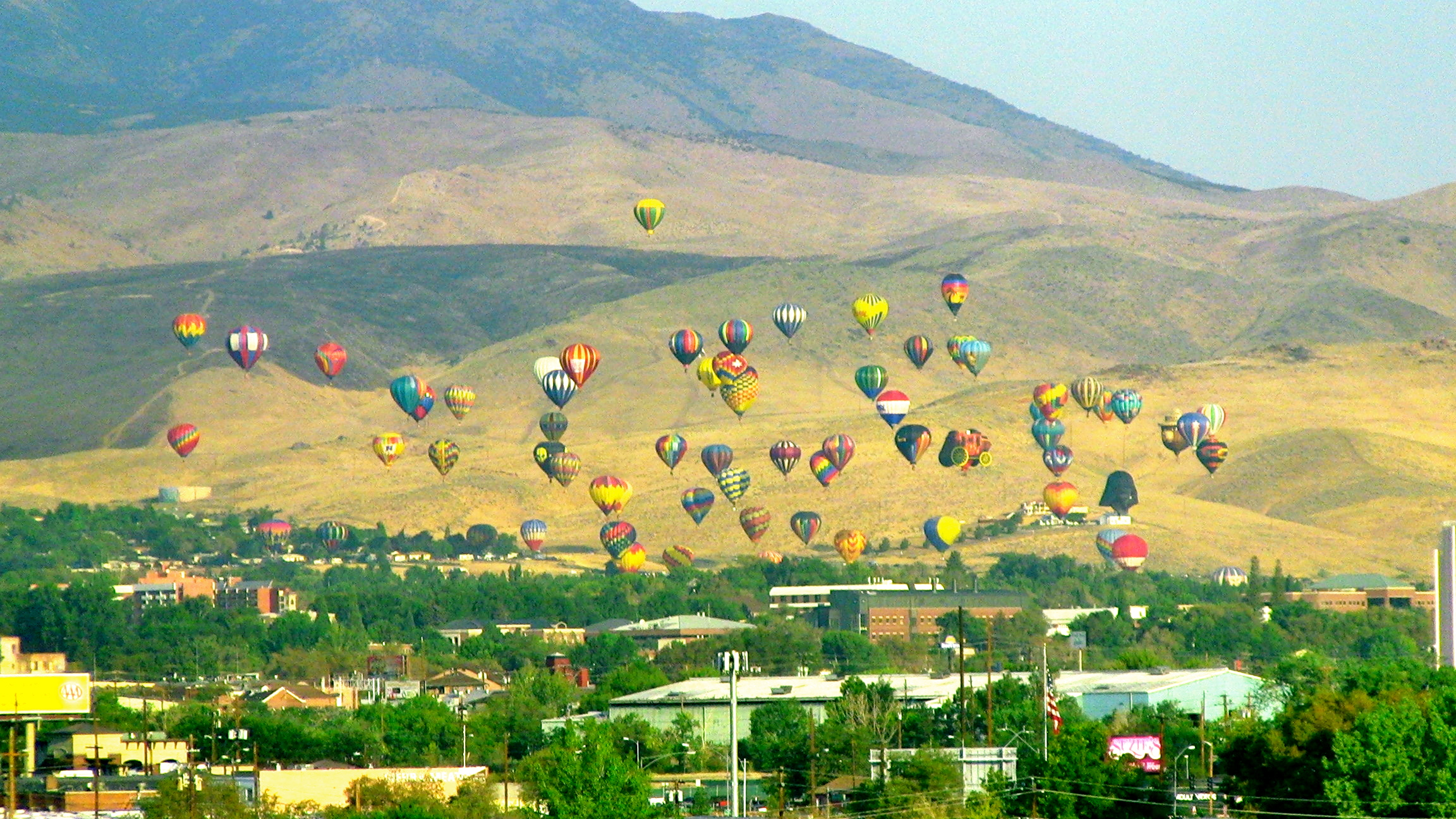
Balloons take flight in the 30th Annual Great Reno Balloon Race, 9 September 2011

The Great Reno Balloon Race (GRBR) is an annual hot-air balloon race held in Reno, Nevada, at Rancho San Rafael Regional Park, located west of the University of Nevada, Reno. The event celebrated its 35th year in 2016. The coordination of the race is managed by a team of both paid staff and volunteers.

The Great Reno Balloon Race is the largest free hot-air ballooning event in the United States, held on the first weekend after Labor Day. The GRBR draws an average crowd of 140,000 each year, making it the largest free event in Northern Nevada. The race includes entrants from across United States as well as numerous other countries.

== History ==
The first balloon race was held in 1982, with 20 balloons participating. Today, more than 100 balloons participate annually.

One of the main shows over the three-day event is the Great Reno Balloon Race, or Dawn Patrol. The term was solidified by the board of trustees when Federal Aviation officials approved predawn flying regulations in 1978. Safety precautions such as special navigation lights became standard, and in 1990, it began launching balloons before sunrise. During Dawn Patrol, pilots face unstable predawn air conditions. The Dawn Patrol marks the beginning of the balloon race.

Since 1998, just before Dawn Patrol, pilots light their lanterns for the Glow Show. The intent is for the balloons to take an appearance similar to a paper lantern, which marks the beginning of the balloon race.

During the COVID-19 pandemic, the 39th edition, scheduled for 2020, was deferred to 2021.

== Volunteers ==
Each year, The Great Reno Balloon Race volunteers, or aeronauts, contribute to running the event. The aeronaut team consists of about 100 people who provide help in areas including field set-up, pilot crewing, and upkeep of the grounds. They also assist everyone involved in the race, from the organizers and pilots to the sponsors and spectators. The volunteer group meets monthly and works in shifts during the actual event.

== Financial ==
GRBR is a 501(c)(3) organization. The bulk of their funding comes from fees and corporate sponsorships.

== See also ==
- Hot air balloon festivals
- Hot air ballooning
