= Galena High School (Nevada) =

Location
- 3600 Butch Cassidy Way; Reno, Nevada 89511; United States; 39.387387°N 119.777026°W

Information
- Type: Public secondary
- Established: 1992
- Principal: Jay Salter
- Teaching staff: 49.50 (on an FTE basis)
- Enrollment: 1,287 (2023–2024)
- Student to teacher ratio: 26.00
- Campus type: Suburban
- Colors: Black and Gold
- Mascot: Grizzly Bear
- Website: https://www.washoeschools.net/galena

Galena High School is a public secondary school in Southwest Reno, Nevada that is a part of the Washoe County School District. The school mascot is the Grizzly Bear, and the school's colors are black and gold. Their sports teams are known as the "Galena Grizzlies".

Galena has been accredited by the Northwest Association of Accredited Schools.

== Academics ==
Galena's academic program has been noted by Newsweek as one of the top 500 high schools in the country, ranking at 474th out of the entire nation.

=== AP Classes ===
Advanced Placement classes are usually taken by students at Galena in their junior and senior years, but some may even take them in their sophomore year. The classes have very high pass rates on the AP exams when compared to the rest of the school district. Many students take the AP classes at Galena because of the high quality of the education.

The following Advanced Placement classes are available at Galena:

- AP Biology
- AP Calculus
- AP Chemistry
- AP English Language and Composition
- AP English Literature and Composition
- AP European History
- AP French Language
- AP Music Theory
- AP Psychology
- AP Spanish Language/AP Spanish Literature
- AP Statistics
- AP U.S. Government
- AP U.S. History

== Athletics ==
Since its founding in 1992, Galena has gone on to win either a league, regional or state championship in every sport played at the school. The Grizzlies used to belong to the High Desert League of the Northern Nevada 4A Region, until the realignment of the 2 leagues in the summer of 2008. They are now part of the Sierra League of the Northern Nevada 4A Region. They completed the first ever Northern Nevada 4A Region Triple Crown in 2007 after winning the football, basketball, and baseball titles.

=== Nevada Interscholastic Activities Association State Championships ===
- Basketball (Boys) - 2007
- Basketball (Girls) - N/A
- Cheerleading (Girls )- N/A
- Cross Country (Boys) - 2001, 2007, 2011, 2025
- Cross Country (Girls) - N/A
- Rifle (Co-ed) - 2012, 2013
- Track and Field (Boys) - 2002
- Softball - 1996 (3A), 1997 (4A), 1999 (4A)
- Volleyball (Girls) - N/A
- Golf (Men's) - N/A
- Tennis (Men's) - 2000, 2023 (4A)

=== Basketball ===
The 2007 Grizzlies boys basketball team brought home the school's first state championship with a 54–51 win over Mojave High School of North Las Vegas. The game, which gave Northern Nevada back-to-back state titles for the first time in over 60 years (the Reno Huskies won the 2006 championship), was played at the Orleans Arena inside the Orleans Hotel and Casino in Las Vegas on February 23, 2007. After winning the state championship, junior forward Luke Babbitt verbally committed to play Division I NCAA basketball for the Ohio State Buckeyes, beginning with the 2008–2009 season. However, in June 2007, Babbitt de-committed from Ohio State and decided to stay home to play for the Nevada Wolf Pack.

Luke Babbit left the Nevada Wolf Pack before his junior year to be eligible for the NBA draft. On June 24, 2010, Luke was the 16th overall draft pick in the first round by the Minnesota Timberwolves. He was traded to the Portland Trail Blazers where he played as a Small Forward.

=== Cross Country ===
The 2007 boys cross country team brought home the school's second state championship, the first since 2001, coached by Domingo Tibaduiza. The team won eleven of the fourteen races they competed in. These included victories at the prestigious Nevada Union Invite and the Stanford Division Two Invitational. They took second at the Mount San Antonio Invite to Barstow, CA, in the process defeating #9 in the South West Region (UT, CO, NV, AZ, NM) Rio Ricco. Flying under the regional and national radar for most of the season, the team then debuted in the regional rankings at #7. The team won regionals over five time defending state champion Reno High School easily, winning with a final margin of 26 to 72. The next week the team again overwhelmed the rest of Nevada in the 4A state championships winning 82 to 39. Nine points off the state record of 30 set by Reno. At the Southwest Regional Championships hosted by Nike, the team took third. Defeating #6 in the nation and Colorado 5A Champions Wheat Ridge High School and #18 Timpview High School. They were 19 points short of defeating #3 in the nation Albuquerque Academy and #8 Los Alamos High School, both of New Mexico. The team received an invite to the Nike Team National Championships, which took place December 1 in Portland, Oregon. They were 1 of 18 teams to be invited, with the top 4 being selected. On November 23 the team cracked the Super Harrier 25, debuting at #20 in the nation. They would sadly be passed over for a berth to Nike Team Nationals. Nike would instead select Rogers, of Arkansas, the class 7A champions who won their state meet with a score of 16 points, but still outside of the top 25. After Nike Team Nationals which Galena was excluded from, Galena moved up to #16, ahead of Rogers and every bubble team taken before them. Academy and Los Alamos would finish the season #2 and #3 in the nation respectively. The No. 16 rank is the best finish by Galena High School and by any Nevada team in cross country history.

=== Football ===
Galena's football program was notorious for their terrible record for nearly the first decade of the school's existence. The Grizzlies were a regular favorite for other schools to play at their homecoming games because it usually meant an easy victory for the home team, since then the team has gone on be one of the better high schools in the valley, winning a league championship. In 2006, under Steve Struzyk as head coach, the Grizzlies lost in the NIAA State Championship game to Las Vegas High School, 33–6. Struzyk retired in 2018 and was replaced by Hank Roberts. Roberts led the Grizzlies to a rough 2–8 season, with a playoff appearance, but Roberts was fired in the following offseason, sparking some controversy in the media, as the firing was done privately, with little reason given. The Grizzlies announced Aaron Cook would take over the program in the 2019 season, his first head coaching job.

== Notable faculty ==
- Domingo Tibaduiza, long distance runner and Olympic athlete

== Notable alumni ==
- Francis Allen-Palenske, former Nevada State Assemblyman and current Las Vegas City Council member
- Amadour, artist, musician, writer
- Drew Anderson, baseball pitcher for the Philadelphia Phillies
- Luke Babbitt (2008), former NBA basketball player
- Steven Lerud (2003), Minor League Baseball manager and former catcher with the Phillies
- Shannyn Sossamon, film actress
- Moses Wood (2018), professional basketball player
