= Incline High School =

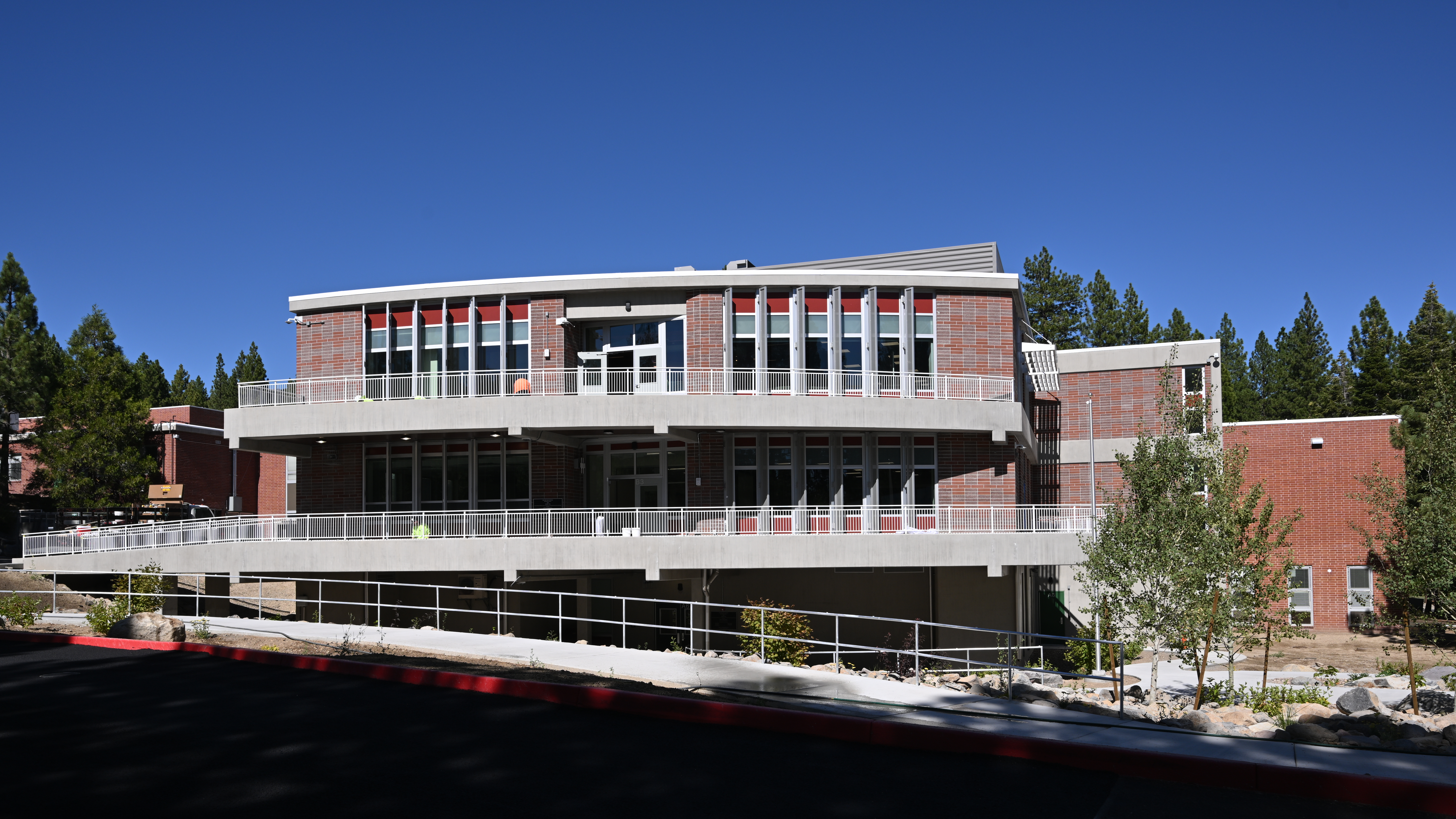

Location
- 499 Village Blvd; NV 89451
- Coordinates: 39.255258°N 119.952254°W

Information
- Type: Public High School
- Motto: To promote Integrity, Humanity, and Scholarship; develop responsible individuals who contribute to society and provide a comprehensive education in a rigorous, supportive, and safe environment.
- Principal: Tierney Cahill
- Teaching staff: 23.50 full-time equivalent
- Enrollment: 304 (2024-2025)
- Student to teacher ratio: 12.94
- Colors: Green and gold
- Mascot: Highlanders
- Website: https://www.washoeschools.net/inclinehs

Incline High School is located in Incline Village, Nevada near Lake Tahoe. It is accredited by the Northwest Association of Secondary and Higher Schools. It is part of the Washoe County School District. They also have multiple championship-winning sports teams called the “Highlanders”.

In 2023 the Washoe County School District trustees have approved a 27 million dollar addition to be completed in time for the 2025-2026 school year that include a student hub, a culinary kitchen, and additional classrooms.
