= North Valleys High School =

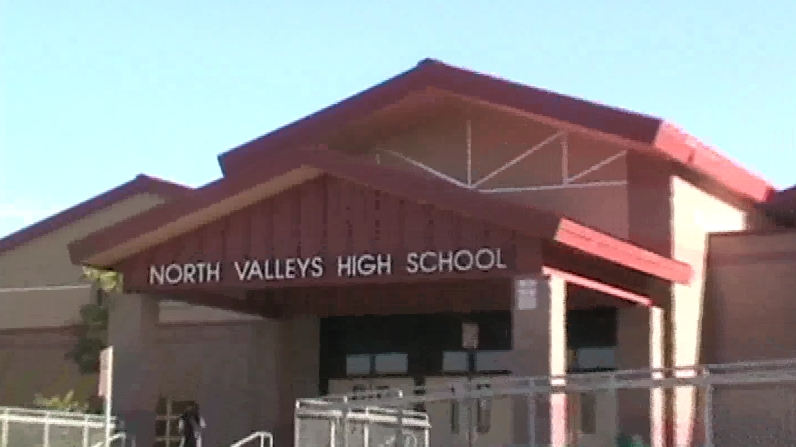

Location
- 1470 E. Golden Valley Rd. Reno, Nevada 89508; 39.60637°N 119.82374°W

Information
- School type: Public, high school
- Motto: Learning today for tomorrow
- Founded: 2001
- School district: Washoe County School District
- Principal: Tomas Macaluso
- Teaching staff: 92.00 (FTE)
- Grades: 9–12
- Enrollment: 2,307 (2024-2025)
- Student to teacher ratio: 25.08
- Colors: Silver, teal and black
- Athletics conference: Sierra League; 3A
- Mascot: Panthers
- Rival: Hug High School
- Website: northvalleys.washoeschools.net

North Valleys High School is located in north Reno, Nevada. NVHS belongs to the Washoe County School District. It was built in 2001 and currently has a student body of roughly 2,250 students. North Valleys competes in the Northern Nevada 3A Region for athletics.

== North Valleys High School Theatre ==
The North Valleys Theatre Program is represented by Troupe #6880, and has had many students win competition at a state, and even national level.

== Junior Reserve Officers' Training Corps ==
NV-20012 is a United States Air Force Junior Reserve Officer Training Corp In Reno Nevada. It operates inside North Valleys High School as an elective class. There are approximately 180 cadets in the Corp divided into 6 flights.

=== Unit history ===
NV-20012 received its activation orders from Air Force Headquarters, on March 26, 2001. The Corps is run by cadets and instructors: Senior aerospace science instructor (SASI) or aerospace science instructor (ASI).

== Notable alumni ==
- Scott Cousins, MLB player who last played in 2013 for the Anaheim Angles (Miami Marlins)
