= Agency for Nuclear Projects =

State agency in Nevada, United States

The Agency for Nuclear Projects (Nuclear Waste Project Office) is a part of the Nevada state government, under the administration of the Governor of Nevada. The organization is based in Carson City.

The Nevada Legislature created the Commission in 1982 to assure that the health, safety, and welfare of Nevada's citizens and the State's unique environment and economy are adequately protected from any federal high-level nuclear waste repository and related activities in the state. Nuclear Waste Policy Act of 1982 The seven-member Commission advises the Governor and Legislature on nuclear waste matters and oversees activities of the Agency for Nuclear Projects (Agency). The Agency oversees the U.S. Department of Energy's (DOE) proposed Yucca Mountain nuclear waste repository project, Federal high-level radioactive waste management program, and related Federal programs. The Agency remains prepared to act to support Nevada's interests as they relate to high-level radioactive waste management.

== See also ==
- Yucca Mountain
