= Spanish Springs High School =

Location
- 1065 Eagle Canyon Drive; Sparks, NV 89441; 39.649947°N 119.729519°W

Information
- Type: Public
- Motto: "Success through Scholarship, Honor, and Spirit"
- Established: 2001
- School district: Washoe County School District
- Principal: Sean Hall
- Staff: 83.00 (FTE)
- Grades: 9-12
- Enrollment: 2,060 (2023-2024)
- Student to teacher ratio: 24.82
- Colors: Purple, silver, and black
- Athletics: 4A
- Athletics conference: High Desert League
- Mascot: Cougar
- Website: http://spanishspringshs.com/

Spanish Springs High School is a public secondary school in unincorporated Washoe County serving students living in Spanish Springs and Sparks, Nevada, part of the Washoe County School District; it is one of three public high schools serving the city of Sparks.

== JROTC ==
Spanish Springs High School features one of the top Army Junior Reserve Officers' Training Corps programs in the United States. In the 2013/2014 school year the program was designated an "Honor Unit with Distinction" for the thirteenth consecutive year.

== Notable alumni ==
- Jake Dalton, Olympic gymnast
- Carson McCusker, MLB outfielder
