= Washoe County School District =

School district in Nevada, United States

Address
- 425 E. 9th Street Reno NV 89512 Northwest Nevada Reno, Sparks, Washoe County, Nevada, Nevada, 89512

District information
- Type: Public
- Motto: Our WCSD Promise: We will know every student by name, strength, and need so they graduate prepared for the future they choose, and we will deliver on this promise in partnership with our families and community.
- Grades: Pre-K-12
- President: Adam Mayberry
- Vice-president: Alex Woodley
- Appointed: Tiffany McMaster
- Governing agency: Independently Governed
- Schools: 104

Students and staff
- Students: 64,192 (2015)
- Teachers: 3,542 (2017)
- Staff: 272 (2015)
- Student–teacher ratio: 20.82 (2015)

Other information
- Schedule: Balanced
- Website: www.washoeschools.net

The Washoe County School District (WCSD) is a public school district providing public education to students in all parts of Washoe County, Nevada, including the cities of Reno and Sparks, and the unincorporated communities of Verdi, Incline Village, Sun Valley and Gerlach. The Washoe County School District is the second largest school district in Nevada with approximately 64,000 students enrolled in 96 schools.

A board of seven elected trustees governs the Washoe County School District. The current president of the WCSD Board of Trustees is Beth Smith. The trustees appoint a superintendent to lead the district in day-to-day operations.

== Superintendent ==
Superintendent Tiffany McMaster leads the Washoe County School District. Joe Ernst was appointed to replace Dr. Susan Enfield, who resigned in 2023, and has served in the position since July 1, 2024.

The Superintendent, as Chief Executive Officer, oversees the day-to-day activities of the District. Joe Ernst provides support to the School Board and the Washoe County School District by managing the Strategic Plan in accordance with established goals.

Tiffany McMaster is the district's Deputy Superintendent.

== Schools ==
The WCSD currently has 66 elementary schools, a special education school, 16 middle schools, 13 comprehensive high schools, Truckee Meadows Community College High School, Innovations High School (a comprehensive high school of choice), Gerlach K-12, and the Academy of Arts, Careers and Technology.

In the WCSD, elementary schools typically include kindergarten through fifth grade, middle schools include sixth grade through eighth grade, and high schools include ninth grade through twelfth grade.

=== K-12 schools ===
- Gerlach K-12 School (consolidation of Gerlach High School and Ernest M. Johnson Elementary School)

=== High schools ===
- Damonte Ranch High School
- Galena High School
- Procter R. Hug High School
- Incline High School
- Robert McQueen High School
- North Valleys High School
- Reno High School
- Edward C. Reed High School
- Spanish Springs High School
- Sparks High School
- Earl Wooster High School
- Academy of Arts, Careers and Technology
- Coral Academy of Science High School
- Debbie Smith CTE Academy
- Innovations High School
- TMCC Magnet High School
- North Star Online School
- Academy of Career Education Charter School

=== K-8 schools ===
- Mount Rose K-8 School

=== Middle schools ===
- B.D. Billinghurst Middle School
- Coral Academy Middle School
- Clayton Middle School
- Cold Springs Middle School
- Depoali Middle School
- Dilworth STEM Academy
- Marce Herz Middle School
- Incline Middle School
- Mendive Middle School
- O'Brien STEM Academy
- Yvonne Shaw Middle School
- Sparks Middle School
- Darrel C. Swope Middle School
- Fred W. Traner Middle School
- Vaughn Middle School
- Desert Skies Middle School
- Sky Ranch Middle School

=== Elementary-schools ===
- Lois Allen
- Anderson
- Bud Beasley
- Jesse Beck
- Esther Bennett
- John Bohach
- Libby C. Booth
- Brown
- Rita Cannan
- Caughlin Ranch
- Roger Corbett
- Desert Heights
- Lloyd Diedrichsen
- Edwin Dodson
- Donner Springs
- Double Diamond
- Florence Drake
- Glenn Duncan STEM
- Katherine Dunn
- Elmcrest
- Nancy Gomes
- Roy Gomm
- Grace Warner
- Greenbrae
- Hidden Valley
- Huffaker
- Ted Hunsberger
- Jesse Hall
- Incline
- Michael Inskeep
- Lena Juniper
- Lemelson STEM
- Lemmon Valley
- Elizabeth Lenz
- Lincoln Park
- Echo Loder
- Bernice Mathews
- Alice Maxwell
- Rollan Melton
- Robert Mitchell
- Marvin Moss
- Natchez
- Virginia Palmer
- Peavine
- Marvin Picollo Special Education School
- Pleasant Valley
- Nick Poulakidas
- JWood Raw
- Agnes Risley
- Miguel Sepulveda
- Silver Lake
- Alice Smith
- Kate Smith
- Smithridge STEM
- Spanish Springs
- Stead
- Sun Valley
- Alyce Taylor
- Mamie Towles
- Edward Van Gorder
- Verdi
- Veterans Memorial STEM
- Westergard
- Jerry Whitehead
- Sarah Winnemucca

Circa 2000 Natchez, in Wadsworth, had about 160 students with 94% being Native American. Enrollment remained at the same level as of 2016. The school is on the Paiute Indian Reservation and is the only school in the district that is on a Native American reservation. Holly O'Driscoll of the Nevada Living Magazine described it as "a small, older" facility. In 2017 Siobhan McAndrew of the Reno Gazette Journal stated that historically Natchez had issues with academic performance but by 2017 had a new principal and newly hired teachers. The district extensively renovated the school in summer 2017, spending $1.5 million to do so.

=== Future schools ===
- Pine Middle School to be turned into an elementary (opening in fall 2028)
- Traner Middle School to be turned into an elementary (opening in fall of 2029)

New Elementary School in Spanish Springs (opening date TBA)

New Elementary School in the Daybreak development (South Truckee Meadows) (opening date TBA)

Future High School in South Truckee Meadows. (opening date TBA)

== School shootings ==
=== 2006 Pine Middle School shooting ===
The Pine Middle School shooting was a school shooting that occurred in the school district on March 14, 2006. The shooting was perpetrated by then fourteen-year-old student James Scott Newman who shot and injured two 14-year-old eighth grade classmates with a .38-caliber revolver that had belonged to his parents. Newman was arrested and charged as an adult on charges of attempted murder, use of a deadly weapon, and use of a firearm by a minor, but later pleaded guilty to different charges of two counts of battery with a deadly weapon, in which he had received sentencing as a juvenile. James Newman was sentenced to house arrest until he completed 200 hours of community service.

On March 25, 2008, athletics teacher Jencie Fagan, who was hailed a hero for her confrontation with the shooter, was selected as one of the three national winners for the Above & Beyond Citizen Honor from the Congressional Medal of Honor Society at a ceremony in Washington, D.C.

=== 2013 Sparks Middle School shooting ===
A student opened fire at Sparks Middle School, a Washoe County School District school. Two students were critically injured, and a teacher was fatally shot while trying to intervene with the student. The gunman then committed suicide by shooting himself. Students from the school were evacuated and were placed at Sparks High School, where they held until they were picked up by their guardians.
