= Earl Wooster High School =

Location
- 1331 East Plumb Lane; Reno, NV 89501; 39.507526°N 119.783099°W

Information
- Type: Public
- Established: 1961
- School district: Washoe County School District
- Principal: David Kitchin
- Staff: 72.00 (FTE)
- Grades: 9-12
- Student to teacher ratio: 20.60
- Colors: Scarlet and white
- Athletics: 4A
- Athletics conference: Sierra League
- Mascot: Colt
- Website: Official website

Earl Wooster High School, or Wooster High School (WHS), is a public secondary school in Reno, Nevada that is a part of the Washoe County School District. Its mascot is the Colt and the school colors are scarlet, white, and silver. It is currently part of the International Baccalaureate program.

== History ==
Earl Wooster High School is named after Earl Wooster, an early president of the Washoe County School District.

== Curriculum ==
In 1996, the school introduced the International Baccalaureate program. Since its implementation, students have participated in the program as preparation for postsecondary education.

== Extracurricular activities ==
=== Athletics ===
Wooster competes in the Sierra League of the Northern Nevada 4A Region. The football program has won eight Nevada state championships.

The wrestling program has won multiple Nevada 4A state championships. The softball team won four consecutive Nevada 4A state titles from 2000 to 2003 and was ranked as high as third nationally by ESPN and fifth in the USA Today high school poll during that period. The baseball team won the Nevada 4A state championship and the Northern Region title in 2002.

=== Publications ===
- Hoofprints — monthly school newspaper
- Pegasus — yearbook
- Colts Tale — literary anthology
- Colt Connection — update newsletter
- The Giddy Up — bi-weekly news program

== Campus ==
Located near the Reno-Tahoe International Airport, Wooster is an open courtyard high school that has individual buildings separated by a covered walkway. There is a large metal and auto shop where industrial education classes are held. Wooster has two gyms and three playing fields, the main one named Joe "Mac" Sellers, after a football coach. The auto shop classes were dropped between the 2003 and 2004 school years.

== Awards and recognition ==
- In 1965, the school produced a United States Presidential Scholar award for a high school senior.
- As of the 2010 school year, Wooster was ranked 177th on Newsweek magazine's list of the 1500 best U.S. high schools.

== Notable alumni ==
- Glenn Carano - NFL quarterback (Dallas Cowboys) and USFL (Pittsburgh Maulers), local chef Eldorado Hotel Casino; class of 1973
- Patty Sheehan - LPGA golf professional, six women's major titles; class of 1974
- Greg LeMond - cyclist and three-time Tour de France winner (turned professional before graduation); class of 1979
- Jason-Shane Scott - TV and film actor; class of 1995
- David Wise - two-time freestyle skiing Olympic gold medalist
- Dave Wyman - NFL linebacker (Seattle Seahawks, Denver Broncos); class of 1982

== See also ==
- Gillman v. Holmes County School District
