= Sparks, Nevada =

City in the United States

- City
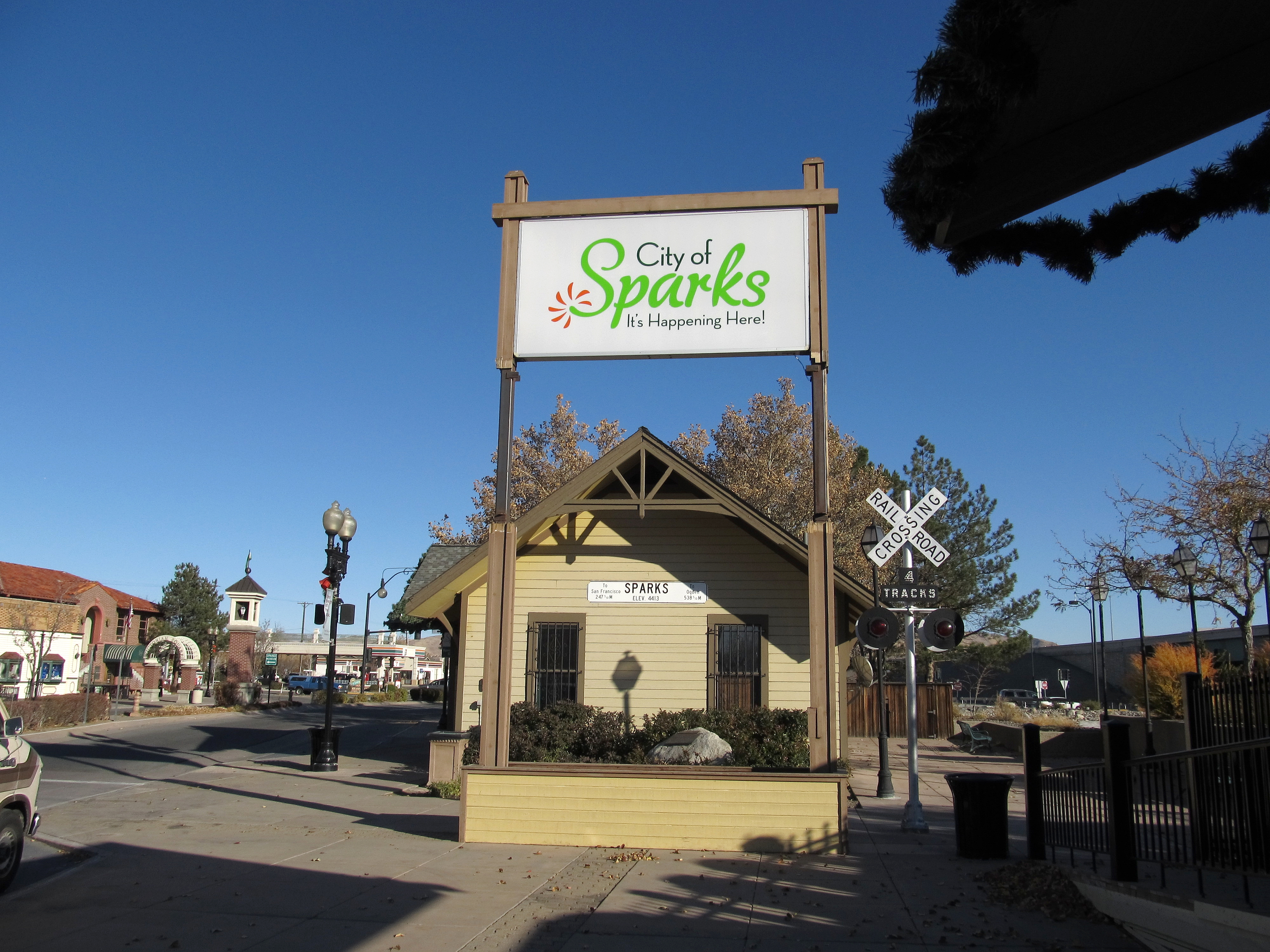

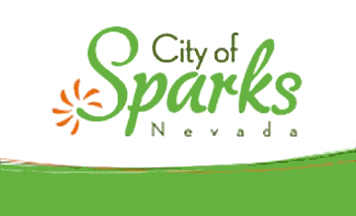
- Flag
- Nicknames: The Rail City, City of Promise
- Motto: "It's Happening Here!"
- Location in Washoe County
- Coordinates: 39°33′16″N 119°44′8″W
- Country: United States
- State: Nevada
- County: Washoe
- Founded: 1904; 122 years ago
- Incorporated: March 15, 1905; 121 years ago
- Named for: John Sparks

Government
  - Type: Council–manager
  - Mayor: Ed Lawson (R)

Area
  - Total: 36.60 sq mi (94.80 km^{2})
  - Land: 36.49 sq mi (94.51 km^{2})
  - Water: 0.11 sq mi (0.29 km^{2})
- Elevation: 4,413 ft (1,345 m)

Population (2020)
  - Total: 108,445
  - Density: 2,971.8/sq mi (1,147.42/km^{2})
- Time zone: UTC−8 (PST)
  - Summer (DST): UTC−7 (PDT)
- ZIP Codes: 89431, 89434, 89437
- Area code: 775
- FIPS code: 32-68400
- GNIS feature ID: 0856391
- Website: www.sparksnv.gov

Nevada Historical Marker
- Reference no.: 88

Sparks is a city in Washoe County, Nevada, United States. Founded in 1904 and incorporated on March 15, 1905, the city is located just east of Reno. As of the 2020 census, Sparks had a population of 108,445. It is the fifth most populous city in Nevada. It is named after John Sparks, the governor of Nevada governor from 1903 to 1908), and last governor elected as a member of the Silver Party.

Sparks is located within the Reno–Sparks metropolitan area.

== History ==
Euro-American settlement began in the early 1850s, and the population density remained very low until 1904 when the Southern Pacific Railroad built a switch yard and maintenance sheds there, after moving the division point from Wadsworth. In 1902, the Southern Pacific purchased a large tract of swamp-like land near its newly built railyard, and gave employees clear deed to a 50 ft × 140 ft (15 m × 43 m) lot for the sum of $1. It also offered to pick up and move every house in Wadsworth and reassemble it in this new town free of charge. As the population increased, a city was established, first called Harriman, after E. H. Harriman, president of the Southern Pacific, and then renamed Sparks, after John Sparks, then governor of Nevada.

Sparks remained a small town until the 1950s, when economic growth in Reno triggered a housing boom north of the railroad in the area of Sparks. During the 1970s, the area south of the railroad started to fill up with warehouses and light industry. In 1984, the tower for the Nugget Casino Resort was finished, giving Sparks its first, and currently only, high-rise casino. In 1996, the redevelopment effort of the B Street business district across from the Nugget that started in the early 1980s took a step forward with the opening of a multi-screen movie complex and the construction of a plaza area. This area, now known as Victorian Square, is a pedestrian-friendly district that hosts many open-air events.

Under direction of the U.S. Environmental Protection Agency, a comprehensive dynamic water quality computer model, the DSSAM Model, was developed (Earth Metrics, 1987) to analyze impacts of a variety of land use and stormwater management decisions throughout the 3,120-square-mile (8,100 km^{2}) Truckee River basin; this model was used to develop a set of surface runoff stormwater management measures for Sparks in the 1980s.

In 2016, Tesla opened Gigafactory Nevada in nearby Storey County and produces lithium-ion EV batteries, the Tesla Powerall, and the Tesla Semi. It employed about 11,000 people in 2025, many of whom live in Sparks.

== Geography ==
According to the U.S. Census Bureau, Sparks has a total area of 35.9 square miles (93.0 km^{2}), of which 35.8 square miles (92.6 km^{2}) is land and 0.15 square miles (0.4 km^{2}), or 0.47%, is water.

=== Climate ===
Sparks has a semi-arid climate. Due to frequent low humidity, especially in the summer, daily temperature ranges are fairly wide. The average January temperatures are a maximum of 48.2 °F (9.0 °C) and a minimum of 24.7 °F (−4.1 °C). Average July temperatures are a maximum of 92.1 °F (33.4 °C) and a minimum of 55.4 °F (13.0 °C). There are an average of 59.5 days with highs of 90 °F (32 °C) and an average of 140.6 days with lows of 32 °F (0 °C). The record high temperature was 108 °F (42 °C) on July 11, 2002, and the record low temperature was −19 °F (−28 °C) on February 7, 1989.

Average annual precipitation in Sparks is 8.38 inches (213 mm). There are an average of 45 days with measurable precipitation. The wettest year was 2017 with 12.38 inches (314 mm) and the driest was 2013 with 3.27 inches (83 mm). The most precipitation in one month was 5.17 inches (131 mm) in January 2017, including the most precipitation in 24 hours, which was 2.41 inches (61 mm) on October 25, 2021.

Average snowfall per year is 6.8 inches (17 cm). The most snow in one year was 23.3 inches (59 cm) in 2016 and the most snow in one month was 14.0 inches (36 cm) in February 2010.

Sparks has a cold desert climate (BW) with warm to hot summers and cool to cold winters. There is a great amount of diurnal temperature variation, causing summers to go from very hot during the day to cool at night. Winter temperatures during the day go well above freezing but can go to as low as 20 °F (−7 °C) during the night.

Climate data for Sparks, Nevada, 1991–2020 normals, extremes 1988–present
Month	Jan	Feb	Mar	Apr	May	Jun	Jul	Aug	Sep	Oct	Nov	Dec	Year
Record high °F (°C)	73 (23)	75 (24)	82 (28)	88 (31)	96 (36)	104 (40)	108 (42)	102 (39)	102 (39)	94 (34)	80 (27)	68 (20)	108 (42)
Mean maximum °F (°C)	61.5 (16.4)	65.9 (18.8)	74.2 (23.4)	80.6 (27.0)	88.3 (31.3)	95.8 (35.4)	100.3 (37.9)	98.5 (36.9)	93.8 (34.3)	84.0 (28.9)	72.3 (22.4)	62.7 (17.1)	100.8 (38.2)
Mean daily maximum °F (°C)	48.2 (9.0)	52.9 (11.6)	59.7 (15.4)	65.0 (18.3)	73.9 (23.3)	83.9 (28.8)	92.1 (33.4)	90.8 (32.7)	83.6 (28.7)	71.6 (22.0)	57.2 (14.0)	47.0 (8.3)	68.8 (20.5)
Daily mean °F (°C)	36.5 (2.5)	40.2 (4.6)	45.8 (7.7)	50.7 (10.4)	58.5 (14.7)	66.7 (19.3)	73.7 (23.2)	72.0 (22.2)	64.9 (18.3)	54.0 (12.2)	43.2 (6.2)	35.8 (2.1)	53.5 (11.9)
Mean daily minimum °F (°C)	24.7 (−4.1)	27.4 (−2.6)	32.0 (0.0)	36.3 (2.4)	43.0 (6.1)	49.4 (9.7)	55.4 (13.0)	53.3 (11.8)	46.1 (7.8)	36.5 (2.5)	29.2 (−1.6)	24.5 (−4.2)	38.2 (3.4)
Mean minimum °F (°C)	9.8 (−12.3)	13.9 (−10.1)	19.3 (−7.1)	23.5 (−4.7)	31.2 (−0.4)	36.6 (2.6)	45.3 (7.4)	43.8 (6.6)	35.2 (1.8)	24.2 (−4.3)	14.8 (−9.6)	9.0 (−12.8)	5.0 (−15.0)
Record low °F (°C)	−3 (−19)	−19 (−28)	14 (−10)	15 (−9)	25 (−4)	30 (−1)	36 (2)	38 (3)	29 (−2)	9 (−13)	2 (−17)	−17 (−27)	−19 (−28)
Average precipitation inches (mm)	1.28 (33)	1.00 (25)	0.85 (22)	0.51 (13)	0.69 (18)	0.39 (9.9)	0.42 (11)	0.28 (7.1)	0.24 (6.1)	0.91 (23)	0.70 (18)	1.11 (28)	8.38 (214.1)
Average snowfall inches (cm)	2.2 (5.6)	1.0 (2.5)	1.0 (2.5)	0.1 (0.25)	0.0 (0.0)	0.0 (0.0)	0.0 (0.0)	0.0 (0.0)	0.0 (0.0)	0.0 (0.0)	0.8 (2.0)	1.7 (4.3)	6.8 (17.15)
Average precipitation days (≥ 0.01 in)	6.3	5.7	5.1	3.4	4.3	2.5	1.9	1.8	1.5	3.1	4.0	5.4	45.0
Average snowy days (≥ 0.1 in)	0.9	1.0	0.5	0.1	0.0	0.0	0.0	0.0	0.0	0.0	0.4	0.9	3.8
Source 1: NOAA
Source 2: National Weather Service

== Demographics ==
Historical population
Census	Pop.	Note	%±
1910	2,500		—
1920	3,238		29.5%
1930	4,508		39.2%
1940	5,318		18.0%
1950	11,378		114.0%
1960	19,827		74.3%
1970	24,187		22.0%
1980	40,780		68.6%
1990	53,667		31.6%
2000	74,526		38.9%
2010	94,728		27.1%
2020	108,445		14.5%

=== 2020 census ===
Sparks, Nevada – Racial and ethnic composition Note: the US Census treats Hispanic/Latino as an ethnic category. This table excludes Latinos from the racial categories and assigns them to a separate category. Hispanics/Latinos may be of any race.
Race / Ethnicity (NH = Non-Hispanic)	Pop 2000	Pop 2010	Pop 2020	% 2000	% 2010	% 2020
White (NH)	46,122	55,410	57,792	69.52%	61.39%	53.29%
Black or African American (NH)	1,507	2,151	3,083	2.27%	2.38%	2.84%
Native American or Alaska Native (NH)	607	876	884	0.91%	0.97%	0.82%
Asian (NH)	3,266	5,169	7,138	4.92%	5.73%	6.58%
Pacific Islander or Native Hawaiian (NH)	316	544	960	0.48%	0.60%	0.89%
Some other race (NH)	84	103	454	0.13%	0.11%	0.42%
Mixed race or Multiracial (NH)	1,376	2,313	5,464	2.07%	2.56%	5.04%
Hispanic or Latino, (any race)	13,068	23,698	32,670	19.70%	26.25%	30.13%
Total	66,346	90,264	108,445	100.00%	100.00%	100.00%

As of the American Community Survey of 2018, there were 104,246 people, 38,056 households residing in the city. The population density was 2,524.3 inhabitants per square mile (974.6/km^{2}). The racial makeup of the city was 76.8% White, 2.5% African American, 1.5% Native American, 5.7% Asian, 0.5% Pacific Islander, and 5.0% from two or more races. Hispanic or Latino of any race were 29.3% of the population.

In 2018, the population of the city was spread out, with 23.5% under the age of 18 and 15.3% who were 65 years of age or older. There were 50.3% females.

In 2018 the estimated median income for a household in the city was $60,785 and 9.9% of the population were below the poverty line.

== Economy ==
Sparks is the corporate headquarters of Sierra Nevada Corporation, an aerospace and defense contractor. In 2024, the U.S. Air Force awarded the company a $13 billion contract to develop a successor to the E-4B, an airborne command post commonly called the "Doomsday plane". The E-4B serves as a mobile nuclear command-and-control post during national emergencies; the replacement program is scheduled to run through July 2036.

Other companies headquartered in Sparks include Haws Corporation and NevadaNano. Haws makes drinking fountains and emergency washing equipment at a 210,000-square-foot plant in the city. The company's founder, Luther Haws, invented the drinking fountain in 1906. NevadaNano develops gas sensors. Its molecular property spectrometer won an R&D 100 Award in 2013.

== Arts and culture ==
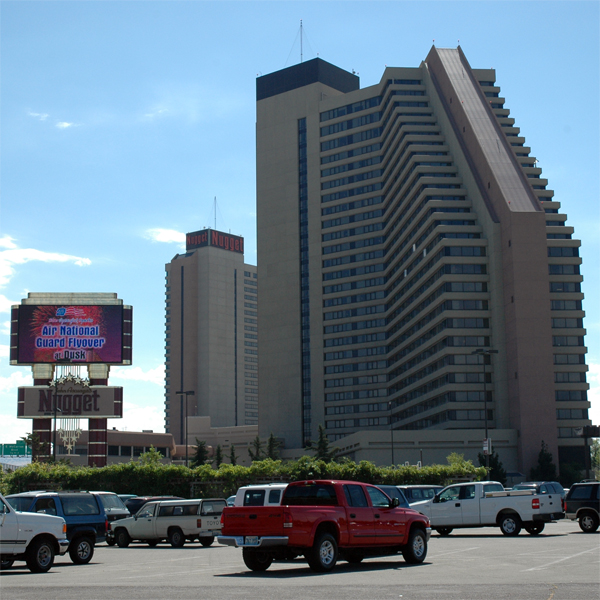
Nugget Casino Resort in Sparks

Cultural events include the Best in the West Nugget Rib Cook-off.

=== Libraries ===
Sparks has two public libraries, one downtown adjacent, and another in Spanish Springs. Both are branches of the Washoe County Library System. The Sparks Library is 23,000 square feet (2,100 m^{2}).

In 2019, the Sparks library started a Drag Queen Story Hour, despite opposition from parents and conservative groups.

=== Newspaper ===
The Sparks Tribune is a weekly newspaper published in Sparks since 1910. It is owned by Battle Born Media.

== Parks and recreation ==
The Nugget Event Center is an 8,600 seat outdoor concert amphitheater in downtown Sparks.

Sparks Marina Park was established on a naturally occurring aquifer in Sparks. Aquatic activities include windsurfing, sailing, swimming, scuba diving, fishing and boating. The surrounding park includes walking paths, a dog park, volleyball courts, playgrounds, picnic areas, showers, and a concession stand.

The Mustang Ranch, described as "Nevada's most infamous brothel", has operated at various locations east of Sparks since 1967.

Sparks is home to two golf courses, Wildcreek and Red Hawk.

== Education ==
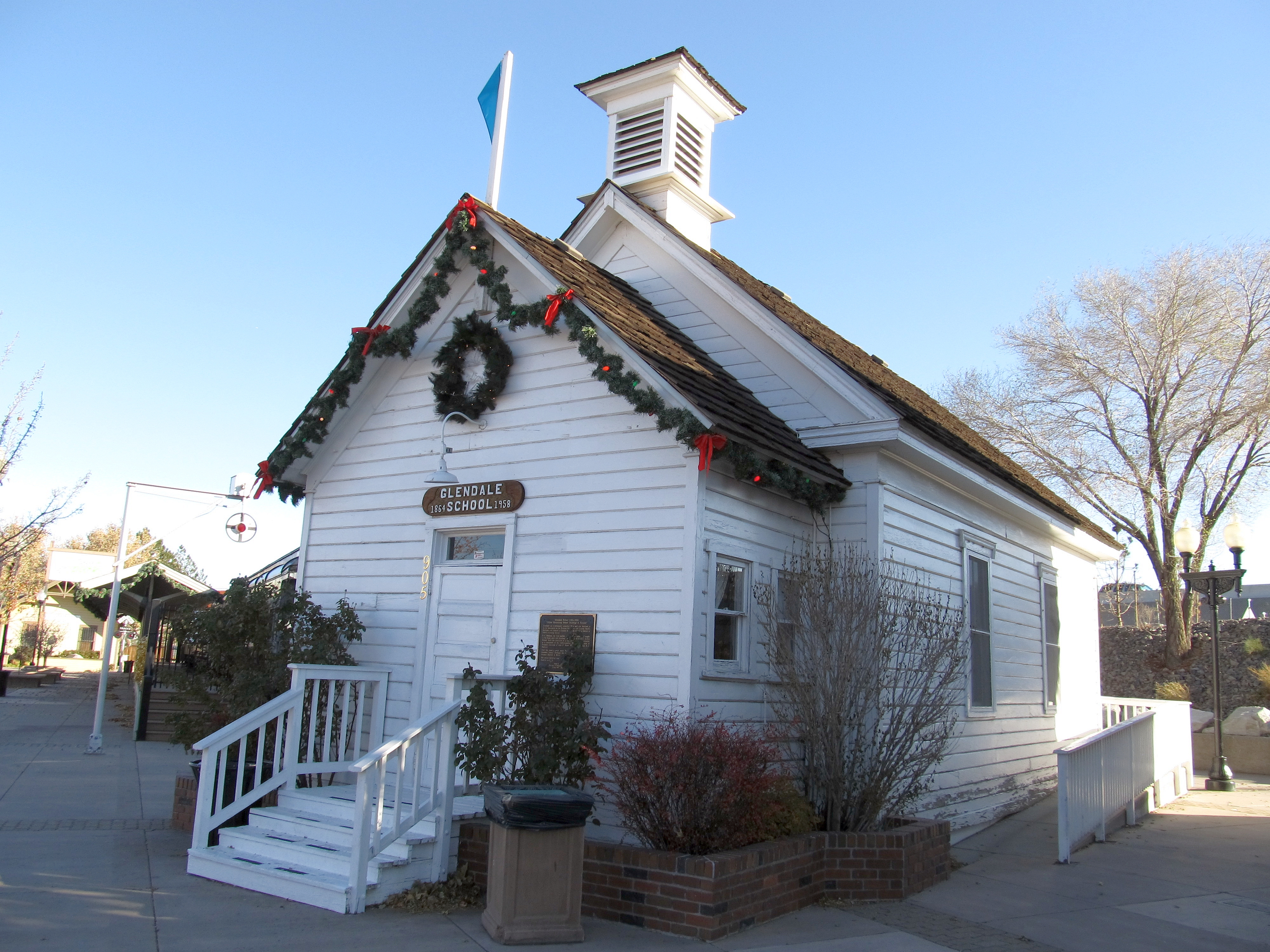
The Old Glendale School, built in 1864, is listed as a Nevada Historical Marker (No. 169). Glendale preceded Reno and is now part of Sparks.

Public education in Sparks is administered by the Washoe County School District.

=== High schools ===
- Edward C. Reed High School
- Sparks High School
- Spanish Springs High School
- Hug High School

=== Middle schools ===
- Sky Ranch Middle School
- Sparks Middle School
- Mendive Middle School
- Dilworth Middle School
- Yvonne Shaw Middle School

=== Elementary schools ===
- Robert Mitchell Elementary School
- Alice Maxwell Elementary School
- Florence Drake Elementary School
- Greenbrae Elementary School
- Lena Juniper Elementary School
- Bud Beasley Elementary School
- Van Gorder Elementary School
- Alyce Taylor Elementary School
- Jesse Hall Elementary School
- Spanish Springs Elementary School
- Katherine Dunn Elementary School
- Miguel Sepulveda Elementary School
- Lloyd Diedrichsen Elementary School
- Excel Christian School (private)

== Infrastructure ==
=== Transportation ===
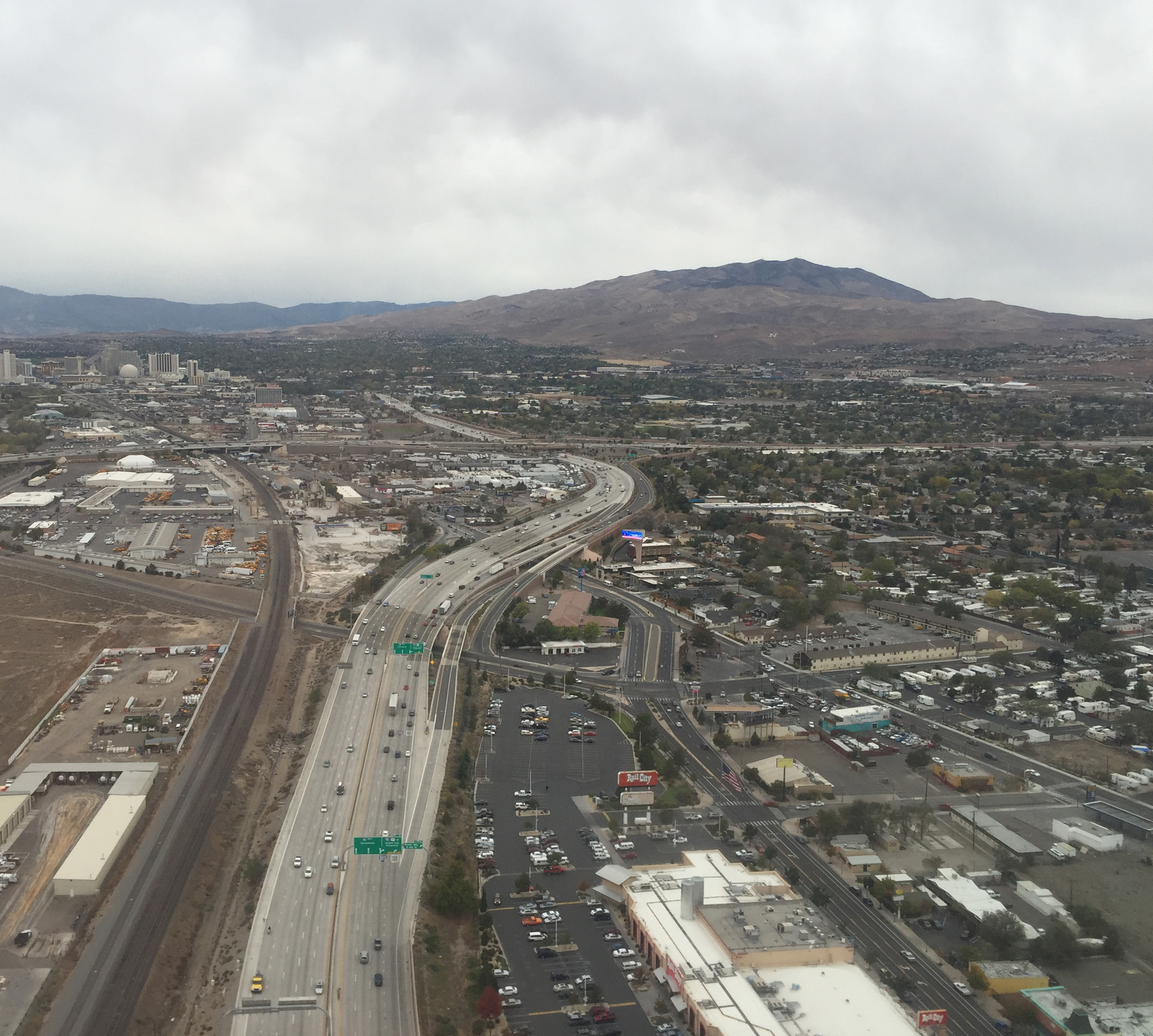
I-80 runs through central Sparks.

The Regional Transportation Commission of Washoe County (RTC) operates a city bus system that serves the cities of Reno and Sparks.

Sparks is served by the nearby Reno–Tahoe International Airport.

==== Rail ====
The Union Pacific Railroad runs east–west through the center of Sparks. The Union Pacific has a significant rail yard south of I-80, just south and adjacent to the Nugget Hotel/Casino towers in downtown Sparks, and is a central part of the area's industrial park. Passenger rail service to the Sparks Amtrak Station ended in 2009, although service continues in neighboring Reno by the California Zephyr.

==== Roads ====
Interstate 80 runs east–west through Sparks. State Route 445 (Pyramid Way), El Rancho Drive, Sullivan Lane, Rock Boulevard, Sparks Boulevard, Vista Boulevard, and State Route 659 (McCarran Blvd) are the city's major north–south thoroughfares. Pyramid Way runs from Nugget Avenue in downtown Sparks to Pyramid Lake, about 35 miles north of the city, and has been designated a Nevada Scenic Byway.

Sparks is connected directly to south Reno by the Southeast Connector. It is a northerly extension of Veterans Parkway to the Sparks Boulevard at Greg Street. It serves as an expressway, with only 2 signaled intersections along its 5.5 mile stretch (one at Pembroke Drive and one at Mira Loma Drive), and constitutes a major arterial connection between Reno and Sparks. It provides an alternative route to existing, overcrowded routes such as the US-395/I-580 freeway, Rock Boulevard, and McCarran Boulevard. Construction began in late 2013, and was completed in July 2018.

Sparks also is gearing up for the record of decision on a major, $1.1 billion (estimated) arterial road project, one that will turn a large portion of Pyramid Highway through nearby Spanish Springs into a controlled access, high speed arterial road that connects directly with the US 395 freeway via a complex interchange at the current Parr Boulevard connection. This will directly connect Spanish Springs, a major population center (parts of which are annexed with the city of Sparks), located in the valley just north of Sparks, with the existing Reno/Sparks freeway system which consists currently of Interstate 80 and US 395. This project will also offer more direct freeway system and inter-valley connections to and from Sun Valley, another major population center of the Reno/Sparks metropolitan statistical area. Sun Valley is located just north of Reno and just west of Spanish Springs, and is home to just over 20,000 residents as of 2020.

== Notable people ==
- Amadour (b. 1995), artist, musician, writer
- Mädchen Amick (b. 1970), actress on Twin Peaks and Witches of East End, born in Sparks
- T. J. Bell (b. 1980), motorsport driver, grew up in Sparks
- Bruce Breslow (b. 1956), former mayor of Sparks
- Scott Cousins (b. 1985), professional baseball player
- Brian Crane, syndicated cartoonist of Pickles
- Jacob Dalton (b. 1991), Olympic gymnast
- Jim Gibbons (b. 1944), former governor of Nevada
- David S. Loeb (1924–2003), businessman, co-founder of Countrywide and IndyMac
- Jena Malone (b. 1984), actress, The Hunger Games, Pride & Prejudice
- Jake McGee (b. 1986), professional baseball player
- Kevin Partida (b. 1995), soccer player
- Steve Portenga (b. 1970), racing driver
- Brian Retterer (b. 1972), NCAA champion swimmer
- Karl Rove (b. 1950), political activist, lobbyist, pundit, and Deputy White House Chief of Staff
- Dan Serafini (b. 1974), professional baseball player with Naranjeros de Hermosillo
- Josh Weston (1973–2012), adult film star
- Vernon White (b. 1971), mixed martial artist
- Gabby Williams (b. 1996), professional basketball player, Olympic medalist
