= Sunset 4A Region =

High school athletic subdivision in Nevada, USA

The Sunset 4A Region is a part of the Nevada Interscholastic Activities Association and is one of two conferences in Southern Nevada 4A high school athletics. The Sunset Region consists of large schools in the western parts of Las Vegas and North Las Vegas and Pahrump, Nevada. There are two division in the Sunset 4A Region, Northwest and Southwest. The Sunset 4A Region was a part of the Southern Nevada 4-A Region, until the conference was divided into two separate regions due to the constant expansion and development of new high schools in the Las Vegas metro.

For the 2008–09 school year, the conference welcomed two new members, Pahrump Valley High School from Pahrump, Nevada who moved up from the class 3A and Desert Oasis High School which opened in southwest Las Vegas in the fall of 2008. Desert Oasis was an independent in football for the 2008 season before joining the Southwest Division as a full-time football member in 2009. They participate in the Southwest Division in all other sports. Pahrump Valley is a full member of the Southwest Division in all sports. Faith Lutheran High School moved from 3A to 4A at the beginning of the 2009–10 school year and is a member of the Northwest Division.

== Current members ==
Northwest Division
| School | Mascot | Type | Location | Enrollment |
| Arbor View | Aggies | Public | Las Vegas | 2,500 |
| Centennial | Bulldogs | Public | Las Vegas | 3,520 |
| Cheyenne | Desert Shields | Public | N. Las Vegas | 2,401 |
| Cimarron-Memorial | Spartans | Public | Las Vegas | 2,946 |
| Faith Lutheran | Crusaders | Private | Summerlin | 1,946 |
| Legacy | Longhorns | Public | N. Las Vegas | 2,480 |
| Mojave | Rattlers | Public | N. Las Vegas | 2,185 |
| Palo Verde | Panthers | Public | Summerlin | 3,339 |
| Shadow Ridge | Mustangs | Public | Las Vegas | 2,211 |
Southwest Division
| School | Mascot | Type | Location | Enrollment |
| Bishop Gorman | Gaels | Private | Summerlin | 1,100 |
| Bonanza | Bengals | Public | Las Vegas | 2,240 |
| Clark | Chargers | Public | Las Vegas | 2,729 |
| Desert Oasis | Diamondbacks | Public | Enterprise | n/a |
| Durango | Trailblazers | Public | Spring Valley | 2,630 |
| Pahrump Valley | Trojans | Public | Pahrump | 1,424 |
| Sierra Vista | Mountain Lions | Public | Spring Valley | 2,317 |
| Spring Valley | Grizzlies | Public | Spring Valley | 2,505 |
| Western | Warriors | Public | Las Vegas | 2,374 |

The Meadows School has affiliate member status in boys and girls' tennis. It has a K–12 enrollment of 763 and competes at the 2A level in other sports.

== Sports ==
The Sunset 4A Region sponsors thirteen sports divided into three seasons: Fall, Winter, and Spring. Sports that are competed during the Fall Season include:

- Cross Country (Boys and Girls)
- Football
- Golf (Girls)
- Soccer (Boys)
- Tennis (Boys and Girls)
- Volleyball (Girls)

Sports that are competed during the Winter Season include:

- Basketball (Boys and Girls)
- Bowling (Boys and Girls)
- Soccer (Girls)
- Wrestling

Sports that are competed during the Spring Season include:

- Baseball
- Golf (Boys)
- Softball
- Swimming and Diving (Boys and Girls)
- Track and Field (Boys and Girls)
- Volleyball (Boys)

Several sports including Roller Hockey and Lacrosse are sponsored by some of the conference's schools but are independent of the NIAA and the Sunset Conference.

== Football rivalries ==
| Schools | | First; Meeting | Game | Trophy | Reigning Champion (Last Meeting) | All-time Record |
| Centennial | Shadow Ridge | 2004 | Jim Marsh Cup | Jim Marsh Cup | Centennial, 44–10 (2011) | Centennial leads 5–3 |
| Arbor View | Legacy | 2007 | Battle of the Bulls | | Arbor View, 42–14 (2011) | Legacy leads 3–2 |
| Bonanza | Spring Valley | 2005 | Battle for the Banner | | Bonanza, 28–14 (2011) | Spring Valley leads 7–1 |

== 2009–10 Champions ==
Fall
| Sport | Northwest Champion | Southwest Champion | Regional Champion |
| Boys' Cross Country | N/A | N/A | Centennial |
| Girls' Cross Country | N/A | N/A | Shadow Ridge |
| Football | Legacy | Bishop Gorman | Bishop Gorman |
| Girls' Golf | N/A | N/A | Faith Lutheran |
| Boys' Soccer | Centennial | Bishop Gorman | Bishop Gorman |
| Boys' Tennis | Palo Verde | Bishop Gorman | Palo Verde |
| Girls' Tennis | The Meadows | Bishop Gorman | Bishop Gorman |
| Girls' Volleyball | Palo Verde | Bishop Gorman | Bishop Gorman |
Winter
| Sport | Northwest Champion | Southwest Champion | Regional Champion |
| Boys' Basketball | | | |
| Girls' Basketball | | | |
| Boys' Bowling | | | |
| Girls' Bowling | | | |
| Girls' Soccer | | | |
| Wrestling | | | |
Spring
| Sport | Northwest Champion | Southwest Champion | Regional Champion |
| Baseball | | | |
| Boys' Golf | | | |
| Boys' Volleyball | | | |
| Softball | | | |
| Boys' Swimming/Diving | | | |
| Girls' Swimming/Diving | | | |
| Boys' Track | | | |
| Girls' Track | | | |

== See also ==
- Nevada Interscholastic Activities Association
- Sunrise 4A Region
- Northern Nevada 4A Region
