= Liberty High School (Nevada) =

Public high school in Henderson, Nevada, United States

- Liberty High School in 2026.

Location
- 3700 Liberty Heights Avenue; Henderson, Nevada 89052; 35.9889°N 115.1529°W

Information
- School type: Public high school
- Established: 2003
- School district: Clark County School District
- Superintendent: Jhone Ebert
- President: Emma Wikler
- Principal: Megan Sensibaugh
- Staff: 128.00 (FTE)
- Grades: 9-12
- Enrollment: 3,203 (2024-2025)
- Student to teacher ratio: 25.02
- Colors: Red, white and navy blue
- Athletics conference: 5A Southern
- Mascot: Patriot
- Team name: Patriots
- Rivals: Bishop Gorman, Coronado
- Website: http://www.libertyhighpatriots.com

Liberty High School (also Liberty or LHS) is a comprehensive public high school located in Henderson in the U.S. state of Nevada. Opened in 2003, it is part of the Clark County School District.

== History ==
An aerial photograph showing Liberty High School (bottom left) in 2018.

Before the school opened in 2003, prospective students chose the name "Liberty" and the school mascot "The Patriot" through a survey mailed to their homes. This was largely chosen due to the recent terrorist attacks. Liberty's mascot is the Patriot.

== Extracurricular activities ==
=== Clubs ===
There are more than fifty clubs that a student can participate in at Liberty. Among them are Ace Dance Crew, anime club, Key Club, National Honor Society, culinary club, and Black Student Union.

=== Air Force Junior Reserve Officer Training Corps ===
Liberty has a United States Air Force Junior Reserve Officer Training Corps (AFJROTC) program, unit NV-20051. They started in 2005 with two instructors. They have drill teams which includes an armed drill team, an unarmed drill team, and a color guard.

== Athletics ==
Liberty's athletic teams, the Patriots, compete in the Southern League of the Nevada Interscholastic Activities Association (NIAA) 5A classification. For most of the school's history the athletic department used a logo based on Pat Patriot, the New England Patriots' logo from 1971 to 1992; it was later replaced with a mark resembling that of Southern New Hampshire University.

Under head coach Rich Muraco, hired in 2009, the football team won eight consecutive Sunrise 4A Region championships from 2010 to 2017 and the Desert Region championship in 2019, and finished as state runner-up in 2012, 2015 and 2016. In 2019 Liberty defeated Bishop Gorman High School, which had won the previous ten state titles, and went on to win the school's first state football championship, defeating Centennial High School 50–7.

Other teams have also won state honors. The girls' bowling team won the school's first NIAA state championship in 2012. The boys' track and field team won the 2013 Sunrise Region championship and placed third at the state meet in 2013 and 2016 and second in 2022. The girls' basketball team were region champions and state runners-up in 2016. The boys' basketball team won the 2022 state championship, defeating Bishop Gorman in overtime, and were runners-up in 2023. The girls' flag football team won the 2021–22 state title over Desert Oasis High School, 12–7.

=== Nevada Interscholastic Activities Association State Championships ===
- Track & Field (Boys) - 2023
- Track & Field (Girls) - 2023
- Swimming (Boys) - 2023
- Basketball (Boys) - 2022
- Flag Football (Girls) - 2022
- Football - 2019
- Baseball - 2014
- Bowling (Girls) - 2012 and 2017

== Performing arts ==
=== Band ===
Liberty's band, known as the Sound of Liberty during their marching season, was founded by Chad Deal and has won many awards and competitions throughout the years that they have been competing. The marching band has been a finalist at the Sounds Across the Valley Nevada Championships consistently throughout their recent history. It performs at football games, basketball games, pep rallies, and school assemblies.

Programs offered include the wind ensemble, symphonic band, jazz band, marching band, winter color guard and drum line.

The symphonic band made its debut CCSD festival performance earning a rating of excellent, and the wind ensemble earned a rating of superior for the 2014–2015 and 2022–2023 school years.

=== Choir ===
Liberty offers five distinct choral ensembles and has developed an innovative approach to music education for students with special needs. Under the leadership of founding director Dr. Nicki Bakko Toliver, Liberty's award-winning choirs gained national recognition, performing at prestigious festivals and events from coast to coast, including appearances in San Diego and New York City. Dr. Toliver currently serves as Associate Director of Choral Activities and Graduate Studies at the renowned Challey School of Music at North Dakota State University in Fargo.

Currently under the direction of Lamont Russell, Liberty's choral program continues its tradition of musical excellence, offering five ensembles: Viva Voce, a mixed chamber choir; Voce Harmonique, a women's chamber choir; Men of Note!, a men's choir; Bella Tones, a beginning-to-intermediate women's choir; and the Patriot Stars Show Choir. The program also features smaller vocal ensembles, including Patriotix A Cappella, a mixed jazz quartet, and a men's barbershop quartet.

Liberty's choirs have also had the opportunity to collaborate with internationally recognized performers, including vocalist Amira Willighagen. Beyond their numerous concerts and festival appearances throughout the year, the ensembles demonstrate a strong commitment to community engagement through service initiatives such as Relay for Life and benefit performances throughout the region.

=== Theatre programs ===
Liberty's theatre program, known as the Patriot Players, is affiliated with the International Thespian Society as Troupe 6730. The school offers courses in theatre and technical theatre at four levels each.

Productions have included Our Town, The 25th Annual Putnam County Spelling Bee, Brigadoon and Grease. The troupe has participated in the Nevada Thespians regional and state festivals and in the International Thespian Festival in Lincoln, Nebraska. The program's recurring events include an annual lip sync competition, a Broadway revue, an evening of classical theatre and a Veterans Day concert.

== Feeder schools ==
- John R. Hummel Elementary School (2003)
- John C. Bass Elementary School (2001)
- Roberta C. Cartwright Elementary School (1999)
- Roger D. Gehring Elementary School (2002)
- Shirley A. Barber Elementary School (2018)
- John R. Beatty Elementary School (2000)
- Steven G. Schorr Elementary School (2006)
- Shirley and Bill Wallin Elementary School (2010)
- Robert and Sandy Ellis Elementary School (2018)
- Charles Silvestri Junior High School (1997)
- Del E. Webb Middle School (2005)

== Notable alumni ==
- Alexander DeLeon (2007), lead singer for The Cab
- Cash Colligan (2007), musician and founding member of The Cab
- Kai Nacua (2013), Safety who played for the Cleveland Browns and San Francisco 49ers
- Malaesala Aumavae–Laulu (2017), offensive tackle for the Baltimore Ravens
- Rae Burrell (2018), basketball player for the Los Angeles Sparks
- Jalen Thomas Brooks (2019), actor
- Troy Fautanu (2019), offensive tackle for the Pittsburgh Steelers
- Julian Strawther (2020), basketball player for the Denver Nuggets
- Moliki Matavao (2021), tight end for the UCLA Bruins
- Germie Bernard (2022), wide receiver for the Alabama Crimson Tide
- Katin Houser (2022), quarterback for the East Carolina Pirates
- Jayden Maiava (2022), quarterback for the USC Trojans

== See also ==
- Other CCSD high schools in Henderson: Basic High School, Green Valley High School, and Foothill High School
- Henderson, Nevada
- Clark County School District
