= The Ricardo Laguna Project =

The Ricardo Laguna Project is a reality television show that aired on March 14, 2012 on MTV Tr3s. Wilmer Valderrama serves as an executive producer on the show. The premier was the most watched show ever on the channel.

== Premise ==
The show follows the life of Ricardo Laguna, a pro BMX rider. After emigrating from Mexico and the age of 13 without knowing any English or having any friends, Ricardo overcame serious odds and became one of today's premier BMX riders. The show is mostly filmed in Las Vegas, Nevada, where Ricardo resides.
