= Desert Oasis High School =

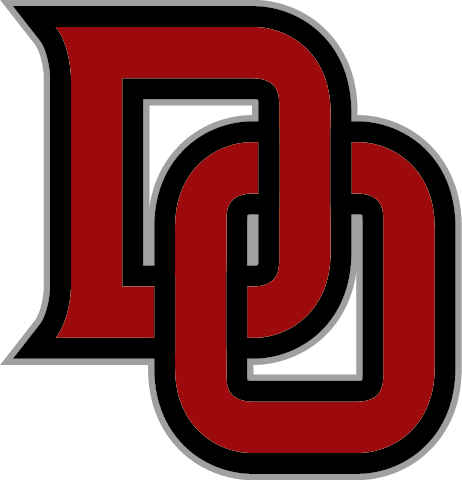

Location
- 6600 W. Erie Avenue; Las Vegas, NV, 89141; 35.99227°N 115.23751°W

Information
- School type: Public high school
- Motto: "Strike at Every Opportunity."
- Established: 2008
- School district: Clark County School District
- Principal: Ian Salzman
- Faculty: 111.00 (FTE)
- Grades: 9–12
- Enrollment: 3,183 (2023-2024)
- Student to teacher ratio: 28.68
- Colours: Crimson, silver, black, and white
- Team name: Diamondbacks
- Rival: Sierra Vista High School
- Website: https://www.desertoasishighschool.org/

Desert Oasis High School is a public high school located in Enterprise, in Las Vegas, Nevada, in the United States. Opened in August 2008, the school is a part of the Clark County School District and was the first new public school to be opened in Clark County since Legacy High School was opened in 2006. The school also transferred approximately 1,000 students from Sierra Vista High School and others from Liberty High School.

== Curriculum ==
Among the normal curricula available at most Las Vegas area high schools, Desert Oasis offers several alternative programs including those in the areas of Business and Career and Technical Education. Some of the classes offered in these programs include: Engineering, Forensic Science, Building & Construction, Principles of Business, Sports Medicine, Video Game Design, Videography, Graphic Design, Multimedia Communications and Marketing.

== Sports programs ==
- Fall sports: Boys & Girls Cross Country, Football, Girls Golf, Boys & Girls Soccer, Boys & Girls Tennis, and Girls Volleyball.
- Winter sports: Boys & Girls Basketball, Boys & Girls Bowling, Girls Flag Football, and Wrestling.
- Spring sports: Baseball, Boys Golf, Softball, Boys & Girls Swimming & Diving, Boys & Girls Track & Field, and Boys Volleyball.
- Year-Round Sports: Cheer

=== State championship titles ===
- 2015-2016 | Boys Bowling
- 2018-2019 | Baseball
- 2020-2021 | Boys Volleyball
- 2021-2022 | Girls Cross Country
- 2021-2022 | Boys Volleyball
- 2022-2023 | Girls Cross Country
- 2022-2023 | Flag Football
- Disc Golf (2012, 2013, 2014, 2015, 2016)

== Notable alumni ==
- Anetra - drag performer
- Cameron Jefferson (2010) - professional football player
- Bryson Stott (2016) - professional baseball player

== Feeder schools ==
- Charles and Phyllis Frias Elementary School (2008)
- Aldeane Comnito Ries Elementary School
- Evelyn Stuckey Elementary School (2010)
- Dennis Ortwein Elementary School (2018)
- Beverly S. Mathis Elementary School (2017)
- Jan Jones Blackhurst Elementary School (2017)
- Carolyn S. Reedom Elementary School (2008)
- William V. Wright Elementary School (2006)
- Mark L. Fine Elementary School (2009)
- Lois and Jerry Tarkanian Middle School (2006)
- Lawrence and Heidi Cannarelli Middle School (2003)
- Barry and June Gunderson Middle School (2021)

== Principals ==
The following have served as principals of the School:

- Emil Wozniak (2008-2014)
- A. J. Adams (2014-2017)
- Kelly O'Rourke (2017-2019)
- Jennifer Boedekker (2019-2022)
- Ian Salzman (2022–Present)
