= Sunrise 4A Region =

High school athletic subdivision in Nevada, USA

The Sunrise 4A Region is a part of the Nevada Interscholastic Activities Association and is one of two conferences in Southern Nevada 4A high school athletics. The Sunrise Region consists of large schools in Henderson, Nevada and on the eastern parts of Las Vegas and North Las Vegas, Nevada. There are two division in the Sunrise 4A Region, Northeast and Southeast. The Sunrise 4A Region was a part of the Southern Nevada 4-A Region, until the conference was divided into two separate regions before the 2000-01 school year due to the constant expansion and development of new high schools in the Las Vegas Valley. Sunrise Mountain High School joined the Northeast Division most recently, during the 2009-10 school year.

== Current members ==
Northeast League
School	Mascot	Location	Enrollment
Canyon Springs	Pioneers	N. Las Vegas	2,595
Chaparral	Cowboys	Paradise	2,583
Desert Pines	Jaguars	Las Vegas	2,572
Eldorado	Sun Devils	Sunrise Manor	1,832
Las Vegas	Wildcats	Sunrise Manor	3,080
Rancho	Rams	N. Las Vegas	3,243
Sunrise Mountain	Miners	Sunrise Manor	2,323
Valley	Vikings	Las Vegas	2,851
Southeast League
School	Mascot	Location	Enrollment
Basic	Wolves	Henderson	2,557
Coronado	Cougars	Henderson	3,022
Del Sol	Dragons	Paradise	2,266
Foothill	Falcons	Henderson	2,583
Green Valley	Gators	Henderson	2,879
Liberty	Patriots	Henderson	2,225
Silverado	Skyhawks	Paradise	2,496
SECTA	Roadrunners	Paradise	1,868

Of these schools; Rancho, Las Vegas, Eldorado and Basic are charter members of the Sunrise 4A League, and are former Sunrise Division schools along with Western High School. Chaparral and Valley, former members of the Sunset Division, joined the league in the 1990s.

Moapa Valley High School and Boulder City High School have affiliate member status in tennis.

Enrollment figures as reported in each school's Clark County School District 2009–10 School Accountability Summary Report. Sunrise Mountain's enrollment figures based on that reported by an independent source.

=== Proposed realignment ===
In June 2011, the NIAA's Southern Realignment Committee approved a realignment of Sunrise 4A Region, Sunset 4A Region and Southern 3A Region that would place 24 teams from Class 4A into Class 4A–Division I and 13 teams, including 3A members Boulder City, Moapa Valley and Virgin Valley, into Class 4A–Division II. The teams were placed into divisions using a point-based rubric that took into account each school's finish in all sports for the 2009–10 and 2010–11 school years. Points were awarded for qualifying for the postseason in most sports, with higher point totals awarded for postseason victories and teams that won region or state titles.

The proposal will be discussed by the NIAA's Board of Governors in late June 2011 and is expected to be approved by the board in October 2011 at a meeting in Las Vegas scheduled for October 2011.

The proposed lineup for the two divisions for the Sunrise 4A Region are:

Division I
Northeast League	Southeast League
Canyon Springs	Basic
Green Valley	Coronado
Las Vegas	Del Sol
Rancho	Eldorado
Silverado	Foothill
Valley	Liberty

Division II
Boulder City
Chaparral
Desert Pines
Moapa Valley
Sunrise Mountain
Tech
Virgin Valley

== Sports ==
The Sunrise 4A Region sponsors thirteen sports divided into three seasons: Fall, Winter, and Spring. Sports that are competed during the Fall Season include:

- Cross Country (Boys and Girls)
- Football
- Golf (Girls)
- Soccer (Boys)
- Tennis (Boys and Girls)
- Volleyball (Girls)

Sports that are competed during the Winter Season include:

- Basketball (Boys and Girls)
- Bowling (Boys and Girls)
- Soccer (Girls)
- Wrestling

Sports that are competed during the Spring Season include:

- Baseball
- Golf (Boys)
- Softball
- Swimming and Diving (Boys and Girls)
- Track and Field (Boys and Girls)
- Volleyball (Boys)

Several sports including Roller Hockey and Lacrosse are sponsored by some of the conference's schools but are independent of the NIAA and the Sunrise Conference.

== Football rivalries ==
There are seven prominent football rivals involving schools within the Sunrise 4A region; one, the Bone Game between Las Vegas and Rancho, is the oldest, continual football rivalry in the state, starting in the 1930s.

=== Within the Sunrise 4A Region ===
Schools		First; Meeting	Game	Trophy	Reigning Champion (Last Meeting)	All-time Record
Las Vegas	Rancho	1930s	The Bone Game	Sir Herkimer's Bone	Las Vegas, 38–6 (2019)	Las Vegas leads 38–25–1
Chaparral	Eldorado	1973	Battle for Merlin's Cleat	Merlin's Cleat	Chaparral, 35–22 (2021)	Chaparral leads 33–14
Basic	Green Valley	1991	Henderson Bowl	Henderson Bowl	Green Valley, 46–21 (2021)	Green Valley leads 20–10
Eldorado	Las Vegas	1993	Battle of Frenchman Mountain		Las Vegas, 52–0 (2019)	
Basic	Foothill	1999	Battle for Boulder Highway		Foothill, 21–0 (2019)	Foothill leads 14–7
Foothill	Silverado	2001	Battle for the Victory Bell	Victory Bell	Foothill, 40–18 (2017)	Foothill leads 13–4

=== Outside of the Sunrise 4A Region ===
Schools		First; Meeting	Game	Trophy	Reigning Champion (Last Meeting)	Next; Meeting	All-time Record
Basic	Boulder City	1940s	Basic-Boulder City Jug Game	Milk Jug	Basic, 20–7 (2011)	2012	Basic leads 31–15–2

== 2009-10 champions ==
Fall
Sport	Northeast Champion	Southeast Champion	Regional Champion
Boys' Cross Country	Valley	N/A	Green Valley
Girls' Cross Country	N/A	N/A	Coronado
Football	Las Vegas	Del Sol	Del Sol
Girls' Golf	N/A	N/A	Green Valley
Boys' Soccer	Las Vegas	Tech	Las Vegas
Boys' Tennis	Eldorado	Coronado	Coronado
Girls' Tennis	Canyon Springs	Liberty	Liberty
Girls' Volleyball	Las Vegas	Green Valley; Silverado	Green Valley

== 2008-09 champions ==
Fall
Sport	Northeast Champion	Southeast Champion	Regional Champion
Boys' Cross Country	Valley	N/A	Green Valley
Girls' Cross Country	N/A	N/A	Coronado
Football	Las Vegas	Basic; Green Valley; Del Sol	Las Vegas
Girls' Golf	N/A	N/A	Silverado
Boys' Soccer	Las Vegas	Tech	Silverado
Boys' Tennis	Eldorado	Coronado	Coronado
Girls' Tennis	Las Vegas	Coronado; Green Valley; Silverado	Green Valley
Girls' Volleyball	Rancho	Green Valley; Silverado	Silverado
Winter
Sport	Northeast Champion	Southeast Champion	Regional Champion
Boys' Basketball	Eldorado	Foothill; Silverado	Eldorado
Girls' Basketball	Desert Pines	Green Valley	Green Valley
Boys' Bowling	Rancho	Silverado	Silverado
Girls' Bowling	Eldorado	Coronado	Eldorado
Girls' Soccer	Rancho	Coronado	Coronado
Wrestling	Las Vegas	Green Valley	Las Vegas
Spring
Sport	Northeast Champion	Southeast Champion	Regional Champion
Baseball	Las Vegas	Green Valley	TBD
Boys' Golf	N/A	N/A	TBD
Boys' Volleyball	Las Vegas	Coronado	TBD
Softball	Valley	Green Valley	TBD
Boys' Swimming/Diving	N/A	N/A	TBD
Girls' Swimming/Diving	N/A	N/A	TBD
Boys' Track	N/A	N/A	TBD
Girls' Track	Valley	N/A	TBD

== See also ==
- Nevada Interscholastic Activities Association
- Sunset 4A Region
- Northern Nevada 3A Region
- Northern Nevada 4A Region
- Southern Nevada 2A Region
- Sunrise 4A Region
- Sunset 4A Region
