= Bonanza High School =

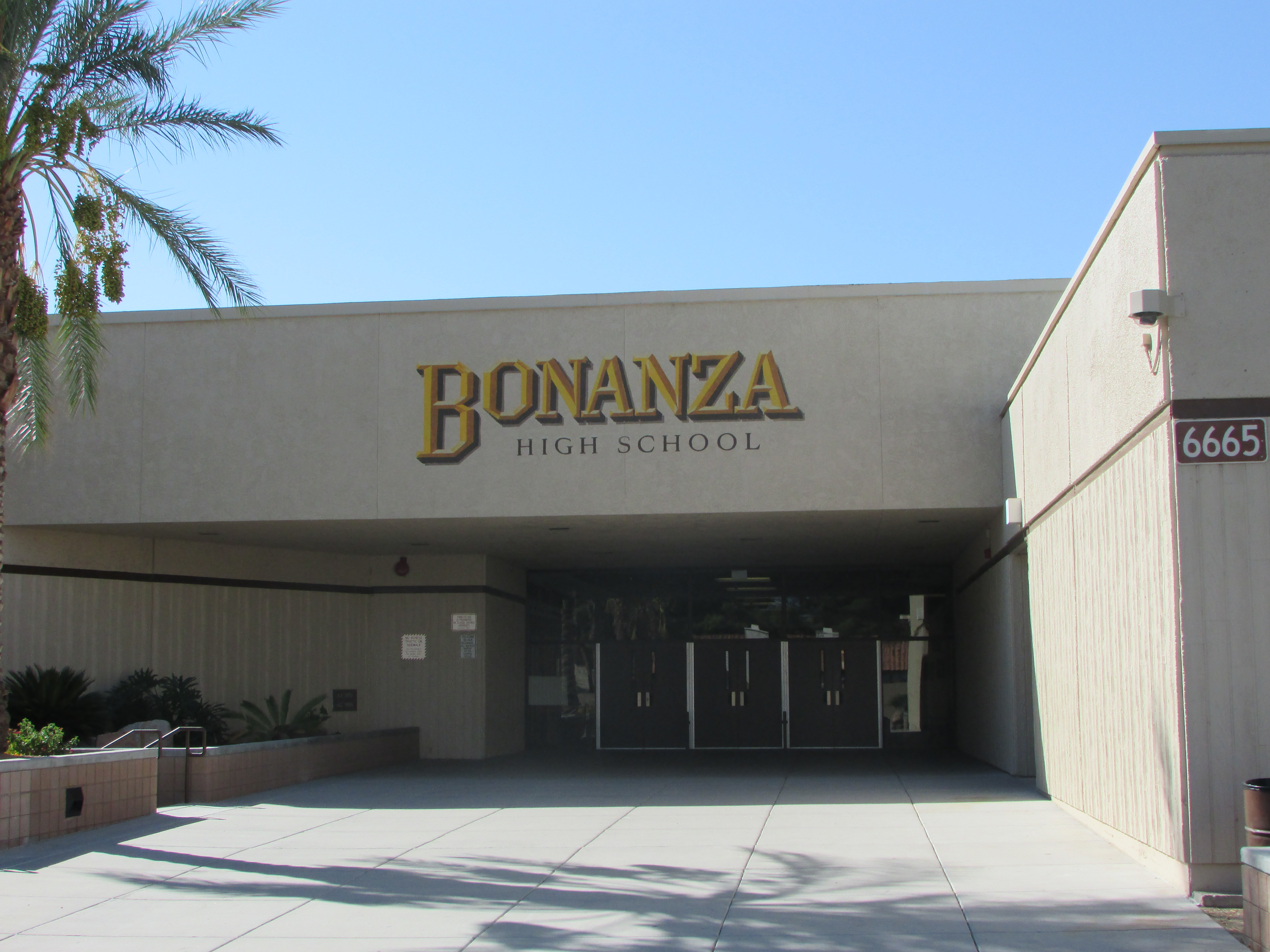

Location
- 6665 Del Rey Ave; Las Vegas, Clark County, Nevada 89146; United States; 36°9′12″N 115°14′11″W

Information
- Established: 1976
- School district: Clark County School District
- Principal: Brian Wiseman
- Teaching staff: 103.00 (FTE)
- Grades: 9–12
- Enrollment: 1,858 (2024-2025)
- Student to teacher ratio: 18.04
- Colors: Brown and Gold
- Team name: Bengals
- Rival: Spring Valley High School
- Website: bonanzabengals.org

Bonanza High School is a high school in the Las Vegas Valley. It was built in 1976 and was the ninth high school to open in the area.

== History ==
Bonanza opened in 1976, and is built in the same configuration as Eldorado High School, Basic High School and Vo-Tech high schools. In the 2004–2005 school year, many former Bonanza students were zoned to attend the newly opened Spring Valley High School.

== Athletics ==
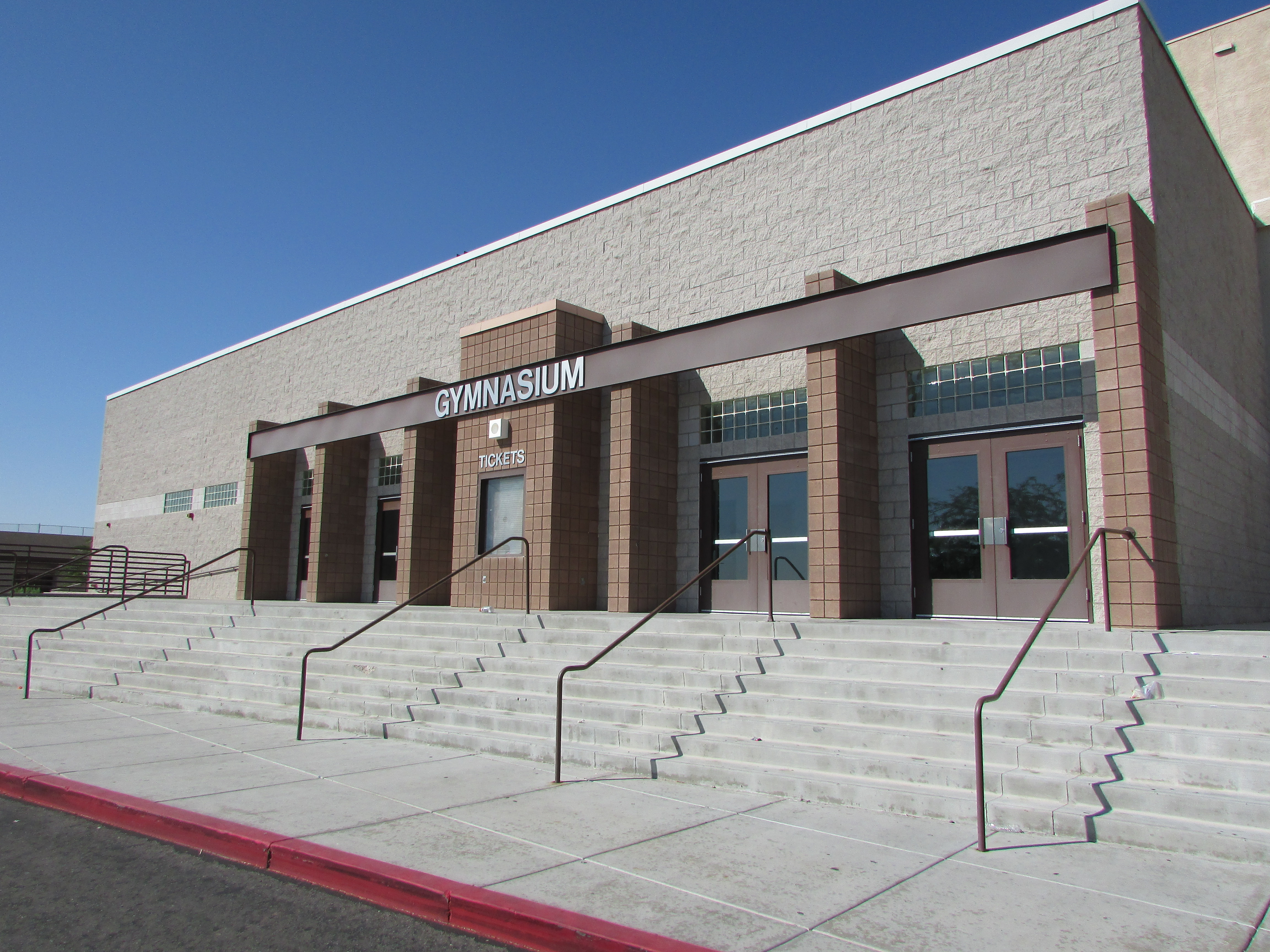
The entrance to the school's gymnasium.

The Bonanza Bengals compete in Sunset 4A Region of the Nevada Interscholastic Activities Association (NIAA).

- Fall Sports
  - Cross Country
  - Football
  - Women's Volleyball
  - Men's Soccer
  - Women's Golf
  - Men's and Women's Tennis
- Winter Sports
  - Basketball
  - Wrestling
  - Women's Soccer
  - Women's Flag Football
  - Bowling
- Spring Sports
  - Track
  - Baseball
  - Softball
  - Men's Golf
  - Boys’ Volleyball
  - Swimming and Diving

Bonanza's mascot is the Bengal. When the school first opened in the 1970s it won many state championships in basketball, wrestling, volleyball, tennis, and golf. Today Bonanza Athletics are best known for its Tennis and Lacrosse programs, with the varsity Tennis team winning the 4A Nevada State Championship in 2001, 2002, 2003, 2005, 2008, the Men's Lacrosse team winning state 3 consecutive times in 2007, 2008, and the Women's Lacrosse team 4 consecutive times in 2005, 2006, 2007, 2008.

=== Nevada Interscholastic Activities Association State Championships ===
- Lacrosse (Girls) – 2005, 2006, 2007, 2008
- Lacrosse (Boys) – 2007, 2008, 2009
- Bowling (Girls) – 2009
- Soccer (Boys) – 1991, 1995, 1996
- Tennis (Boys) – 2001, 2002, 2003, 2005, 2008
- Volleyball (Girls) – 1987
- Volleyball (Boys) – 2011
- Soccer (Girls) – 2004
- Track ( Boys ) - 1984, 1985

== Notable alumni ==
- Linda M. Bell ('86) – associate justice of the Nevada Supreme Court
- Annie Black ('99) – politician
- Greg Brower ('82) – Senator in the Nevada Senate and former United States Attorney for the District of Nevada
- Kris Bryant ('10) – former Chicago Cubs and San Francisco Giants, current Colorado Rockies 3B/OF, 2015 NL Rookie of the Year, 2016 NL MVP, Hank Aaron Award winner, Dick Howser Trophy winner, 2016 World Series Champion
- David Cohen (born 1984) – jockey
- Joe Fernandez ('96) – technology entrepreneur
- Lance Gross ('99) – actor
- Corinna Harney ('90) – model and actress
- Brianna Hernandez-Silva ('17) - flag football player
- Mark Hutchison ('81) - Lieutenant Governor of Nevada
- Jonathan Jackson ('96) – former professional NFL and defunct XFL player
- Jenna Jameson ('92) – adult film actress
- Daniel Kucan ('88) – actor, designer, and television personality on Extreme Makeover: Home Edition
- Joe Kucan ('83) – actor, director, casting director
- Justin Leone ('95) – former professional MLB player
- Gray Maynard (transferred) – 2-time Ohio State Champion and 3-time NCAA All-American wrestler; professional mixed martial artist, former UFC Lightweight Title Contender
- Rob Meadows ('95) – serial entrepreneur
- Frank Mir ('98) – Nevada State Champion wrestler; professional mixed martial arts fighter, former UFC Heavyweight Champion and Interim UFC Heavyweight Champion
- Scott Piercy ('96) – PGA Tour professional golfer
- Jason Reed ('86) – actor, musician
- Dan Reynolds ('05) – frontman for Grammy Award-winning rock band Imagine Dragons
- Gerald Riggs ('78) – former professional NFL player
- Lee Scrivner ('89) – novelist, musician, professor
- Adam Seward ('00) – former professional NFL player
- Chasen Shreve ('08) – professional MLB player
- Jason Zucker (transferred) – first professional NHL player from Nevada
