= Canyon Springs High School (North Las Vegas, Nevada) =

Public high school in Nevada, United States

Coordinates: 36.2337°N 115.1366°W

- 350 E Alexander Rd; Las Vegas, NV 89032

Information
- Type: Public high school
- Motto: Start Strong. Stay Strong. Be Strong. Finish Strong.
- Established: 2004
- School district: Clark County School District
- Principal: Adam Canfield
- Staff: 100.00 (FTE)
- Grades: 9–12
- Enrollment: 2,810 (2023–2024)
- Student to teacher ratio: 28.10
- Colours: Navy, Silver and light (Columbia) blue
- Athletics conference: Sunrise 4A Region
- Team name: Pioneers
- Publication: Pioneer Press
- Website: Canyon Springs High School

Canyon Springs High School is a public high school in North Las Vegas, Nevada, and is part of the Clark County School District. Canyon Springs is also home to the Leadership and Law Preparatory Academy and was one of three (including Del Sol High School and Spring Valley High School) schools opened by the district in 2004.

== Leadership and Law Preparatory Academy ==
Canyon Springs High School houses the Leadership and Law Preparatory Academy, a college preparatory magnet program that made Canyon Springs the second school in the Clark County School District (aside from the Advanced Technologies Academy) to offer a four-year program in legal studies. The campus includes a fully functioning courtroom.

Magnet Schools of America has named the Leadership and Law Preparatory Academy a magnet school of excellence for the 2014-2015 and 2015-2016 school years.

Magnet students use Microsoft Office applications to create projects using multimedia content. Magnet classes have Apple MacBook Air computers to work on their projects.

== Extracurricular activities ==
=== Athletics ===
The athletic teams at Canyon Springs are known as the Pioneers and compete in the Northeast Division of the Sunrise 4A Region.

==== Nevada 4A Titles ====
- Basketball (Boys) - 2011
- Soccer (Boys) - 2024

== Notable alumni ==
- Juron Criner, Ottawa Redblacks wide receiver
- Yemiyah Morris, basketball player
- Donnel Pumphrey, Philadelphia Eagles, Running Back
