= Foothill High School (Henderson, Nevada) =

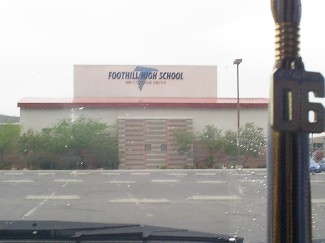
- Foothill High School

Location
- 800 College Drive, Henderson, Nevada 89002; 36°0′18″N 114°57′57″W

Information
- School type: Public high school
- Motto: Going Above and Beyond; Graduation For All!
- Established: 1999
- School district: Clark County School District
- Principal: Jonathan Synold
- Teaching staff: 102.00 (FTE)
- Grades: 9–12
- Enrollment: 2,406 (2024–2025)
- Student to teacher ratio: 23.59
- Colours: Navy blue, Columbia blue, and Vegas gold
- Athletics conference: Sunrise 4A Region
- Team name: Falcons
- Publication: Bird’s Eye View (1999-2004); The Hillside Hotwire (2004-present)
- Yearbook: Peregrine
- Website: www.foothillhenderson.com

Foothill High School is a four-year secondary school in the Clark County School District, located in the city of Henderson, Nevada.

== Programs and academics ==
=== SkillsUSA ===
Foothill operates a chapter of SkillsUSA with many successes.

In 2013, the team of James Schaeffer and Gino Alvarez placed 5th place in Television (Video) Production at the National Leadership and Skills Conference held in Kansas City, Missouri.

In 2014, the team of Blake Wilson and Dustin Griffie placed 1st place in Web Design at the National Leadership and Skills Conference held in Kansas City, Missouri.

=== FST News ===
Foothill operates a student-run news station that mirrors a real world TV Station. The program was developed and launched in 2001 by instructor Karen Vaughan and student Matt Mayhood, the latter returning to teach the program in 2012 after working at various television stations.

They provide a daily broadcast to students with news and other happenings around campus.

FST News also works alongside the police departments of Henderson, Boulder City and Clark County (Las Vegas Metropolitan) to produce Every 15 Minutes.

=== Speech and debate ===
In June 2008, Foothill High School hosted the 2008 National Speech and Debate Association National Championships.

Falcon Academy

Established in 2019.

=== MAYBE Inc. ===
Foothill operated a business and leadership class, MAYBE Inc.

Students were taught several skills including business management and workplace readiness.

The program closed in 2019.

== Athletics ==
=== Football ===
The Falcons reached the state semi-final game in 2001 where they lost by a last minute 57-yard field goal (kick was the 2nd longest FG in state history & made in snowy conditions). The school's football program has won several division championships, qualified for the playoffs yearly, and has reached the state tournament several times.

=== Marching band ===
The Foothill Marching Band is the largest marching band in the history of Nevada.

The Foothill Marching Band broke state records when they made Finals in two Bands of America competitions in California and Utah in 2010. The band has made Band of America Regional Finals several times.

"Finals" Performances by the Foothill High School in Bands of America Regional Championships

Date	Location	Score	Place
October 23, 2010	Hemet, California	71.40	6
November 6, 2010	St. George, Utah	76.85	8
October 29, 2011	St. George, Utah	77.35	10
October 27, 2012	Glendora, California	73.55	8
November 3, 2012	St. George, Utah	84.75	3
November 2, 2013	St. George, Utah	79.25	10
November 9, 2013	Long Beach, California	79.30	5
November 1, 2014	St. George, Utah	77.95	7
November 8, 2014	Long Beach, California	74.35	10
October 24, 2015	Long Beach, California	79.05	4
October 31, 2015	St. George, Utah	80.90	4
October 29, 2016	St. George, Utah	83.20	3
November 4, 2017	St. George, Utah	86.075	3

As of right now, they are one of four bands across the country to help TAMA test their new drums (that have not yet been released.)

The Marching Band has participated in the St. Patrick's Day Parade in Dublin, Ireland.

In May, 2012 the band traveled to march in the National Memorial Parade in Washington DC.

In December 2012 the Foothill Drumline participated in the Very Vegas Holiday at The Smith's Center and performed with the Las Vegas Philharmonic Orchestra.

The Foothill Drumline also performed with Trace Adkins at the American Country Awards on December 10, 2013. This was nationally televised on Fox.

The Marching Band is also one of few high schools to perform in the Macy's Day Parade in 2014.

The Drumline captured sixth place at the WGI World Championship Finals in 2015.

The Foothill High School Marching Band won the Marching Band Open Series (MBOS) Nevada Championships claiming the title of the Best Marching Band in State for three straight years, 2015, 2016 & 2017. Each year they have swept the high caption awards in every category; Outstanding Music, Outstanding Visual and Outstanding General Effect.

The Marching Band performed at the 2017 Tournament of Roses Parade in Pasadena, California.

=== Cross country ===
The girls cross country team won the Sunrise Regional Championships in 2005 and 2006 and made a State Championship appearance in 2013. In 2014, the girls won the Sunrise Regional Championship with five of their teammates winning 1st, 6th, 7th, 10th and 11th places in the 5k. In 2016, the girls team took 2nd in the Sunrise Regional Championship by one point.

The boys team won the Sunrise Regional Title in 2007 and 2010.

=== Basketball ===
The program hosts the annual Big Time Tournament during the summer, which attracts schools from all over the nation to compete.

=== Dance ===
The dance team has won several in and out of state competitions. The Foothill High School Varsity Dance Team has won the Nevada 4A State Dance Championships four times in the past four years and also placed 14th in the national championship. The team captured two national championship titles at the National Dance Championships in 2007, and another national title in 2008.

=== Baseball ===
Foothill has qualified for playoffs nearly every year.

In the 2013–14 season, the Falcons made it to the semi-finals of the Regional Tournament.

== Commencement speech controversy ==
An incident at the school's commencement on June 15, 2006 sparked a lawsuit against the school. The commencement was held at The Orleans Hotel and Casino in Las Vegas, where 400 graduates and their families were gathered for graduation. The commencement speech of Foothill valedictorian, Brittany McComb (then 18 years old) was cut short after a school employee pulled the plug on the microphone during her speech. A video of the incident shows that the sound system was cut off.

McComb unsuccessfully brought suit against the school in the United States District Court for the District of Nevada, citing as defendants the principal, the assistant principal, and the school employee who turned off the sound system on McComb.

== SADIES poster controversy ==
In February 2021, a picture of a white cheerleader attending Foothill holding a SADIES poster circulated online. The poster read, "If you went to SADIES w/ me it would take my BREATH away,” with an image of George Floyd, a black man who died while being arrested by police officers, drawn onto the board. CCSD discussed and implemented an anti-racism policy as a result of this incident.

== Assault on a teacher controversy ==
On April 20, 2022, an incident occurred at the school where a student locked the door and subsequently pulled a knife out of her pocket, before charging at the teacher with the weapon. The teacher was not injured using a chair as defense before the Clark County School District Police arrived on the scene. This and a similar assault at Eldorado High School prompted Superintendent Jesus F. Jara to advocate for panic buttons in each classroom.

== Notable faculty ==
- Lisa Cano Burkhead, principal (2015–2021) and 36th Lieutenant Governor of Nevada

== Feeder schools ==
- James E & A Rae Smalley Elementary School
- Marlan J. Walker Elementary School
- Fay Galloway Elementary School
- Gordon McCaw Elementary School
- Ulis Newton Elementary School
- Lorna J. Kesterson Elementary School
- Neil C. Twitchell Elementary School
- John C. Vanderburg Elementary School
- B. Mahlon Brown Junior High School
- Lyal Burkholder Middle School
- Jack & Terry Mannion Middle School
- Bob Miller Middle School
