= Valley High School (Winchester, Nevada) =

American public high school

Location
- 2839 Burnham Avenue; Las Vegas, NV, 89169; 36.138°N 115.121°W

Information
- School type: Public high school
- Motto: Ensuring a better world through academic excellence and global vision
- Established: 1965
- School district: Clark County School District
- Principal: Kimberly Perry Carter
- Teaching staff: 122.00 (FTE)
- Grades: 9–12
- Enrollment: 2,467 (2024–2025)
- Student to teacher ratio: 20.22
- Colours: Red, white, and blue
- Athletics conference: Sunrise 4A Region
- Team name: Vikings
- Website: Valley High School

Valley High School (VHS) is a comprehensive public high school located in the unincorporated town of Winchester, Nevada established in 1965. Part of the Clark County School District, in addition to serving the zoned neighborhoods surrounding the school, Valley also has an International Baccalaureate magnet program. Both the IB Diploma Programme and Middle Years Programme are offered.

== History ==
The front of Valley High School in 2026.

Valley High School opened in the fall of 1965. The campus was designed by Zick & Sharp, and built by Del E. Webb Corporation.

On March 19, 1982, psychology and sociology teacher Clarence Piggott was shot to death and two students were wounded by 17-year-old student Patrick Lizotte. The shooter was later shot and wounded by police before his arrest. Lizotte was sentenced to two consecutive life sentences without the possibility of parole, but was granted parole in September 2016, and released on February 10, 2017, after a Nevada law banning life without parole for juveniles reduced his sentence to 20 years to life.

The U.S. men's Olympic basketball team held several practices in the gymnasium of Valley High School in June and July 2008 in preparation for the Beijing Olympics.

== Academics ==
=== Academy of Hospitality and Tourism ===
Valley High School is also home to the Academy of Hospitality and Tourism (AOHT) program, the oldest in the state.

=== International Baccalaureate ===
Since September 1, 1979, Valley High School has been an authorized Middle Years Program (MYP) and Diploma Program (DP) International Baccalaureate school. Valley High School is #140 on the International Baccalaureate list of schools around the globe.

Unlike the rest of the school, the International Baccalaureate Program at Valley High School has its own student governing body, named the Valley High School International Baccalaureate Council (VHSIBC or IBC). Ever since the authorization of Valley High School International Baccalaureate, the Valley High School International Baccalaureate Council aims to represent the students of the DP and MYP programs at Valley High School and in the greater community, extend the IB curriculum beyond the classroom, encourage and promote the advancement of the International Baccalaureate, cultivate and sponsor social and cultural events at the school, and to foster a positive impact with the community and with the students of the IB programs.

The IB Council is the responsible governing agency for the welfare of all International Baccalaureate students at Valley High School. The council operates on public meetings hosted weekly at the school, and is dictated by parliamentary procedures, CCSD regulations, Nevada Revised Statutes, International Baccalaureate Organization mandated regulations, and the IBC Official Constitution. The IB Council 2015-2016 is the first ever council to organize its structure based on its constitution, its democratic elections, and its administrative structure.

== Athletics ==
Valley High School's football field in 2026.

Valley High School's athletic program is known as the Vikings and competes in the Northeast Division of the Sunrise 4A Region. Valley has historically had a prominent baseball program, producing Major Leaguers Mike Morgan, Matt DeWitt, Doug Mirabelli, Tyler Houston and Greg Maddux.

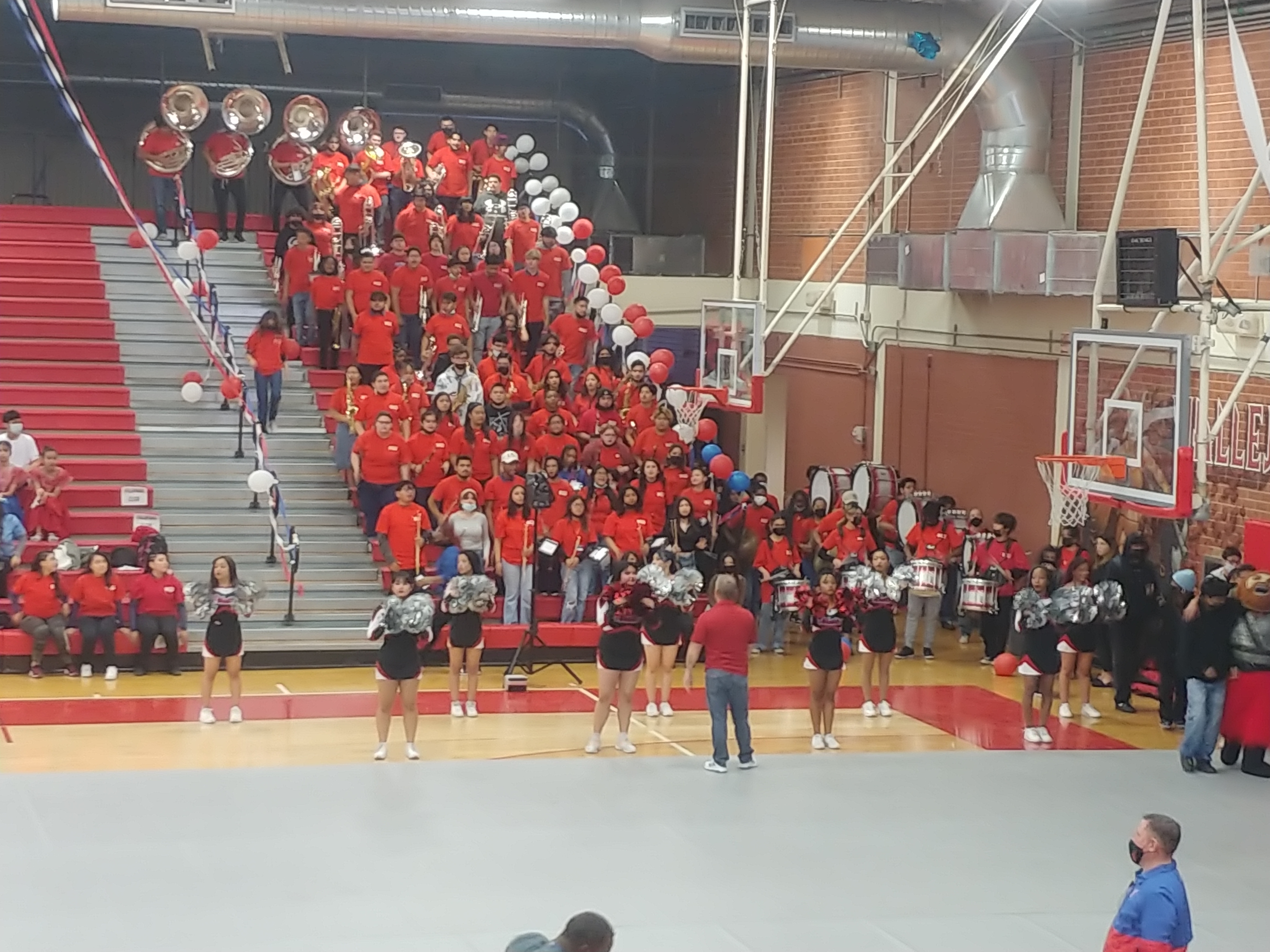
Valley High School's band performing during an assembly on March 11th, 2022.

=== State Championships ===
- Baseball - 1970, 1981, 1983, 1985, 1986, 1988, 1989
- Basketball (boys) - 1980–1983, 1998
- Football - 1969, 1978
- Track and field (boys) - 2009
- Volleyball (girls) - 1976, 1977
- Tennis (boys) 1976
- Wrestling - 1973, 1974

== Extracurricular activities ==
Valley High School is home to various clubs, organizations, and activities. The school's diverse community allows students to create clubs, different organizations, and various activities that both open engagement and opportunity to all students across campus.

=== Valley High School band ===
The Valley High School Band, also known as the Vanguard, is the official marching band and pep band for the high school. In addition to these ensembles, the program offers students the opportunity to play in year round concert bands, jazz band, woodwind choir, brass choir, percussion ensemble, and winter guard.

== Notable alumni ==
- Freddie Banks, UNLV and professional basketball player
- Shelley Berkley, Mayor, City of Las Vegas, former congresswoman (D-NV)
- Steve Chitren, Major League Baseball pitcher
- Matt DeWitt, Major League Baseball pitcher
- Dayvid Figler, Municipal Court judge and writer
- Tony Fredianelli, guitarist for Third Eye Blind
- Tyler Houston, Major League Baseball infielder
- Greg Maddux, Major League Baseball pitcher
- Doug Mirabelli, Major League Baseball catcher
- Mike Morgan, Major League Baseball pitcher
- Steve Rodriguez, Major League Baseball infielder and college baseball coach
- Stevenson Sylvester, NFL linebacker drafted by the Pittsburgh Steelers in the 5th round of the 2010 NFL draft (166th overall)
- Kerwynn Williams, NFL running back
