= Jonathan Jackson (linebacker) =

American football player (born 1977)

No. 58
- Position: Linebacker

Personal information
- Born: September 2, 1977 (age 49); Dayton, Ohio, U.S.
- Listed height: 6 ft 2 in (1.88 m)
- Listed weight: 248 lb (112 kg)

Career information
- High school: Bonanza (Las Vegas, Nevada)
- College: Oregon State
- NFL draft: 2000: undrafted

Career history
- Kansas City Chiefs (2000)*; Las Vegas Outlaws (2001); New Orleans Saints (2001); Berlin Thunder (2002)
- * Offseason or practice squad member only
- Stats at Pro Football Reference

Jonathan Jackson (born September 2, 1977) is an American former professional football player who was a linebacker for the Kansas City Chiefs and the New Orleans Saints of the National Football League (NFL). He played college football for the Oregon State Beavers. He also played for the Las Vegas Outlaws of the defunct XFL.

== High school ==
Jonathan attended Bonanza High School in the Las Vegas Valley. He was a two-year starter on the football team and also lettered in basketball.

== College career ==
Jonathan attended Oregon State. He played 44 games in four years totaling 279 tackles, 4 sacks, 3 interceptions and 3 fumble recoveries. He received his degree in Business Administration.

== Professional career ==
Jackson went undrafted in the 2000 NFL draft. He was signed as an undrafted rookie free agent by the Kansas City Chiefs, but was released during training camp. Due to his ties with Las Vegas, the newly created Las Vegas Outlaws of the XFL drafted Jackson with the 332nd pick in the inaugural XFL draft. On January 6, 2002, Jackson made his sole NFL appearance for the New Orleans Saints against the San Francisco 49ers in the final game of the 2001-02 regular season. During the 2002 season Jackson played for the Berlin Thunder in NFL Europe.
