= Pahranagat Valley High School =

High school in Alamo, Nevada, United States

Location
- 158 Main St. Alamo, Nevada 89001; United States; 37°21′41.9″N 115°09′54.1″W

Information
- School type: Public
- School district: Lincoln County School District
- Superintendent: Pam Teel
- Principal: Brooke Foremaster
- Staff: 6.33 (FTE)
- Years taught: 9–12
- Enrollment: 90 (2024-2025)
- Student to teacher ratio: 14.22
- Color
- Athletics conference: NIAA 1A
- Mascot: Panthers
- Communities served: Lincoln County, Nevada
- Feeder schools: Pahranagat Valley Middle School
- Website: sites.google.com/lcsdnv.com/pvhs/

Pahranagat Valley High School is a high school in Alamo, Nevada, United States. The name originates from the surrounding area, the Pahranagat Valley. It is part of the Lincoln County School District, with offices in Panaca. The school enrolls students grades 9–12. The 2025 graduating class consisted of 22 students.

== Athletics ==
Pahranagat Valley High School competes in the Nevada Interscholastic Activities Association 1A Division in several extracurricular sports programs, including:

- Football
- Basketball
- Softball
- Track
- Volleyball
- Wrestling
- Baseball

The school's eight-man football team had a 104-game winning streak which lasted from 2008 to 2016. It was the third-longest winning streak in high school football history.
