= Ricardo Laguna =

- Born: April 13, 1982 (age 44); La Paz, Baja California Sur, Mexico
- Occupations: Professional BMX Rider, Television Personality
- Years active: 2003-Present
- Website: www.ricardo-laguna.com

Ricardo Laguna (born April 13, 1982) is a Mexican-American professional BMX rider and television personality.

== Early life ==
Born in La Paz, Mexico, he and his family—younger brother Ricardo Angel and parents Ricardo Arturo and Marisela Laguna—moved to Tijuana, Mexico briefly when he was 8 years old before seeking a better life. After gaining citizenship, Ricardo's father moved the Laguna family to Las Vegas when he was 13. While not knowing any English and growing accustomed to his new lifestyle, Ricardo took immediate interest in riding bikes. After riding dirt jumps everyday around his neighborhood, it would eventually launch his BMX career. Ricardo attended Eldorado High School, where he graduated in 2000.

== Professional career ==
After competing at the amateur level for a couple years, where he won the "DK DIRT CIRCUIT" in Lake Perris, California he then went on to win The Core Tour King of Dirt Series. In 2003, Laguna turned pro at the age of 21. Laguna started hosting Clark County Extreme Thing, the largest Music Action sports festival in Nevada for 12 years. Laguna is the founder of Hispanic Fest at the Cannery casino and hotel. In 2016, Laguna started executive producing a cable television show "Live With Lisa" on Cox Cable.

== Rankings ==
=== 2001 ===
- 1st place in Perris, CA. DK Dirt Circuit
- 1st place in Venice Beach, CA. "King of Dirt and the Panasonic Shockwave Core Tour"
- 2nd place in LA County Fair, CA. "King of Dirt and the Panasonic Shockwave Core Tour"

=== 2003 ===
- 1st place in Obregon, Mexico. "Rey De Las Rampas"
- 3rd place in Jones beach, NY. "King Of Dirt"
- 10th place in Huntington, CA. "King Of Dirt Finals"
- 18th place in Cleveland, Ohio. "Gravity Games"

=== 2004 ===
- No. 1 Ranked Latin-American Dirt Jumper
- King Of Ramps LCQ winner in Huntington Beach, CA. "Vans Triple Crown"
- 1st place in Obregon, Mexico. "Rey De Las Rampas"
- 2nd place in Phoenix, Az. "Orme dam Jam Bicycles Comp"
- 2nd place in San Diego, CA. "County Fair Comp"
- 2nd place in Huntington Beach, CA. Triple Challenges "Vans Triple Crown"
- 3rd place in Jones Beach, NY. "King Of Dirt"
- 11th place in Huntington Beach, CA. "King Of Dirt"

=== 2005 ===
- 2nd place in Phoenix, Az. 10th Annual "Fort McDowell Burn Bike festival"
- 3rd place in San Diego, Ca. "Dirt Jumping Contest"
- 5th place in Las Vegas, NV. "Vans Let it Ride"
- 5th place in Sydney, Australia. "BMX Games"
- 6th place in London, Uk. "Sprite Urban Games"
- 9th place in Oklahoma, Ok. "CFB (Crazy Freaks Bikers)Comp"
- 10th place in Las Vegas, NV. ExtremeThing "Ricardo Laguna Pro BMX Dirt Challenge"
- 11th place in Louisville, Ky. "Mountain Dew Action Sport Tour"
- 15th place in Orlando, Fl. "Mountain Dew Action Sport Tour" Finals
- 15th place in Whistler, Canada. "Red Bull Elevation"
- 19th place in San Jose, Ca. "Mountain Dew Action Sport Tour"
- 23rd place in Denver, Co. "Mountain Dew Action Sport Tour"
- 23rd place in Portland, Or. "Mountain Dew Action Sport Tour"

=== 2006 ===
- 5th place in Las Vegas, NV. ExtremeThing "Ricardo Laguna Pro Challenge"
- 6th place in Wellington, New Zealand. "X-Air"
- 6th place in Montellier, France. "Nokia Fise"
- 8th place in Sydney, Australia. "BMX Game"
- 16th place in Oklahoma City, Ok. "CFB Comp"

=== 2007 ===
- No. 1 Ranked South American Dirt Jumper
- 1st place in Zurich, Switzerland. "Bike Day"
- 1st place in Cali, Colombia. "Rey De La Tierra"
- 2nd place in Cologne, Germany. "The Worlds Suzuki Masters"
- 2nd place in Cleveland, Oh. "Mountain Dew Action Sport Tour" OQ
- 3rd place in Louisville, KY. "Mountain Dew Action Sport Tour" OQ
- 6th place in Montpelier, France. "Nokia Fise"
- 11th place in Las Vegas, NV. ExtremeThing "Ricardo Laguna Pro Challenge"
- 20th place in Orlando, FL. "Mountain Dew Action Sport Tour" FINALS
- 20th place in Salt Lake, UT. Mountain Dew Action Sport Tour"
- 21st place in Baltimore, MD. "Mountain Dew Action Sport Tour"
- 22nd place in Cleveland, OH. "Mountain Dew Action Sport Tour"

=== 2008 ===
- 1st place in Montpellier, France. "Fise"
- 2nd place in Cleveland, OH. "Dew Tour" OQ
- 2nd place in Linz, Austria. "Austria King Of Dirt" Best trick
- 3rd place in Linz, Austria. "Austria King Of Dirt"
- 3rd place in Bordeaux, France. "Lord Of Dirt"
- 4th place in Costa Mesa, CA. "LG Triples Box"
- 7th place in Las Vegas, NV. ExtremeThing "Ricardo Laguna Pro BMX DirtChallenge"
- 10th place in Cologne, Germany. "BMX Masters"
- 14th place in Baltimore, Md. "Mountain Dew Action Sport Tour" OQ
- 21st place in Guadalajara, Mexico. "Red Bull Elevation"

=== 2009 ===
- 2nd place in Bordeaux, France. "Lord Of Dirt" For best trick
- 5th place in Montpellier, France. "Fise"
- 5th place in Las Vegas, NV. ExtremeThing "Ricardo Laguna Pro BMX Dirt Challenge"
- 8th place in Cologne, Germany. "IBMXFF World Championship"
- 10th place in Bordeaux, France. "Lord Of Dirt"
- 10th place in Munich, Germany. "Big In Bavaria"
- 13th place in San Jose, Ca. "Warriors Of Wood"
- 15th place in Chicago, Il. "Mountain Dew Action Sport Tour" OQ

=== 2010 ===
- 3rd place in Montpelier, France. "Fise"
- 4th place in Munich, Germany. "Big In Bavaria"
- 9th place in Solothurn, Switzerland. "Bike Day"
- 13th place in Cologne, Germany. "BMX Masters"

=== 2011 ===
- 1st place in Costa Rica. "King Of Dirt"
- 2nd place in Bullhead City, AZ. "Slam n Jam" King of Dirt"
- 2nd place in Phoenix, AZ. "A Day Of Fun Pro BMX Dirt Jam"
- 2nd place in Bogota, Colombia. "Los brincos de tierre"
- 6th place in Las Vegas, NV. ExtremeThing "Ricardo Laguna Pro Dirt Challenge"
- 8th place in Montpelier, France. "Fise"
- 10th place in Austin, Texas. "Texas Toast Jam"

=== 2015 ===
- 2nd place in Las Vegas, NV. "American Patriot Fest"
- Presenter for the MMA awards
- MC Host for Miss United States Nevada at the South Point Hotel, Casino & Spa
- Tap the keg for Hofbrauhaus Las Vegas to end oktoberfest
- First Pitch for the Las Vegas 51's now known as the Las Vegas Aviators
- Founded "Celebrando Festival" at the Cannery Casino and Hotel

=== 2016 ===
- MC Host at the Sahara Las Vegas for the Las Vegas Fire & Rescue Department bachelor Auction raising money towards the "Burn Survivors Foundation".
- MC Host for Miss United States Nevada at the South Point Hotel, Casino & Spa
- Producer and editor for Cox Communications TV show "Live With Lisa".
- Co-host for KTNV-TV "Valley View Live" TV show.
- Judge for Miss Grand International at the WestGate hotel and casino Westgate Las Vegas.
- Ramp builder for Steve Aoki
- 2nd Place in Las Vegas, NV. UCI USA BMX "Silver Dollar" South Point Hotel, Casino & Spa.
- 2nd place in Las Vegas, NV. "American Patriot Fest".
- Angel Of The Year for Clark County 20th Vulnerable Roads Users Project Awards.
- Principal for a day for the Clark County School District.
- Grand marshal for Nevada PEP 6th annual "Run Walk Roll Against Bullying" at UNLV.
- Food Judge for KMXB Mix 94.1 "Bite Of Las Vegas".

=== 2017 ===
- Skatepark builder, MC Host and Athlete in Dubai United Arab Emirates Red Bull Air Race World Championship
- MC Host for Miss USA Silver State Latina at the Las Vegas–Clark County Library District
- MC Host for Land rover Jaguar Cars Las Vegas Fashion Show
- TournEvent winner for Everi inc at The Venetian Las Vegas
- 1st place in Las Vegas, NV. Nellis BMX Track UCI USA BMX "Silver State Championship Race"
- 1st place in Las Vegas, NV. Ed Fountain BMX Track UCI USA BMX "Silver State Championship Race"
- 1st place in Boulder City, NV. Boulder City BMX Track UCI USA BMX "Silver State Championship Race"
- 1st place in Henderson, Nevada. Whitney Mesa BMX Track UCI USA BMX "Silver State Championship Race"
- State Champion in Las Vegas, Nevada. Ed Fountain BMX Track UCI USA BMX "Silver State Championship Race"

=== 2018 ===
- 1st place in Henderson, Nevada. Whitney Mesa BMX Track UCI USA BMX "Silver State Championship Race"
- MC Host for Miss USA Silver State
- MC Announcer for the Las Vegas Lights FC soccer team at the Cashman Field
- mint 400 Driver in Primm, Nevada 50th anniversary
- 1st place in Las Vegas, NV. Ed Fountain BMX Track UCI USA BMX "Silver State Championship Race"
- 1st place in Boulder City, NV. Boulder City BMX Track UCI USA BMX "Silver State Championship Race"
- 1st place in Las Vegas, NV. Nellis BMX Track UCI USA BMX "Silver State Championship Race"
- 1st place in Henderson, Nevada. Whitney Mesa BMX Track UCI USA BMX "Silver State Championship Race"
- State Champion in Las Vegas, Nevada. Ed Fountain BMX Track UCI USA BMX "Silver State Championship Race"

=== 2019 ===
- MC Host for Miss USA Nevada at the South Point Hotel, Casino & Spa
- Guest singer for KMXB Mix 94.1 The Masked Singer (American TV series) as the covered crooner
- Tap the keg for Hofbrauhaus Las Vegas to end oktoberfest
- First Pitch for the Las Vegas Aviators
- 1st place in Boulder City, NV. Boulder City BMX Track UCI USA BMX "Silver State Championship Race"
- 1st place in Las Vegas, NV. Nellis BMX Track UCI USA BMX "Silver State Championship Race"
- 1st place in Las Vegas, NV. Ed Fountain BMX Track UCI USA BMX "Silver State Championship Race"
- 1st place in Henderson, Nevada. Whitney Mesa BMX Track UCI USA BMX "Silver State Championship Race"
- State Champion in Las Vegas, Nevada. Ed Fountain BMX Track UCI USA BMX "Silver State Championship Race
- Greenspun Media Group Vegas Magazine Men's Book Committee along with Jon Gray
- Presenter for the MMA awards

=== 2020 ===
- 1st place in Las Vegas, NV. Ed Fountain BMX Track UCI USA BMX "Gold Cup Series"
- 1st place in Las Vegas, NV. Ed Fountain BMX Track UCI USA BMX "Silver State Championship Race"
- 1st place in Boulder City, NV. Boulder City BMX Track UCI USA BMX "Silver State Championship Race"
- State Champion in Las Vegas, Nevada. Ed Fountain BMX Track UCI USA BMX "Silver State Championship Race

=== 2021 ===
- 2nd place in Henderson, Nevada. Whitney Mesa BMX Track UCI USA BMX "Silver State Championship Race"
- 1st place in Las Vegas, NV. Nellis BMX Track UCI USA BMX "DK Bicycles Gold Cup Series"
- 1st place in Las Vegas, NV. Nellis BMX Track UCI USA BMX "Silver State Championship Race"
- 1st place in Boulder City, NV. Boulder City BMX Track UCI USA BMX "Silver State Championship Race"
- 1st place in Las Vegas, NV. Ed Fountain BMX Track UCI USA BMX "Silver State Championship Race"

== Sponsors and brands ==
He is currently sponsored by Powerbar, Woodward Camp, TSG Safety Gear, Corrupt Bikes, and ossur

== Accolades and appearances ==
- Laguna created the "Ricardo Laguna Pro Dirt Challenge" and the "Ricardo Laguna Rail Jam" for the last 12 years, which takes place every year at Extreme Thing Sports and Music Festival which is held at Desert Breeze Park in Las Vegas. In 2012 Laguna made the "Ricardo Laguna Pro Dirt Challenge" a series with a second stop in Lake Havasu Arizona
- Was the premier Spanish live announcer for the X-Games inside the Home Depot Center located in Carson, California and the Staples Center in Downtown Los Angeles
- In 2007 Laguna earn the #1 South American Dirt Jumper in Cali Colombia
- in 2007 ESPN showedcase Laguna's Lexus IS 350 as one of the hottest whip for action sports
- In 2009, Laguna was nominated for "the BMX dirt jumper of the year" from BMX Plus Magazine.
- Has Appeared twice on the cover of BMX Plus Magazine.
- Laguna was a presenter at the 2010 and 2012 World MMA Awards held at The Palms Hotel and Casino in Las Vegas.
- In 2010 Laguna appeared in an episode of Holly's World starring Holly Madison.
- Also in 2010, Vegas Magazine celebrated the 50 most influential singles in Las Vegas called the "Las Vegas Black Book 2010" in which Laguna was named along with Matt Goss, Floyd Mayweather Jr. among other Las Vegas celebrities and high profiled residents.
- In 2010 Laguna hosted a 1-hour TV show called the American Latino TV that aired on the networks, My Network TV, CBS, CW, IND, ABC, NBC, Comcast Corporation, and Fox.
- Laguna was named one of Las Vegas' Hottest Bachelors in 2009 by Las Vegas Magazine.
- In 2011, Laguna won the South American title "King of Dirt."
- In 2013 Laguna grace the cover of 7 magazine and voted one of the most intriguing people of 2013 http://vegasseven.com/2013/01/24/ricardo-laguna-2/
- in 2014 Laguna was awarded North Las Vegas Honorary Citizen of North Las Vegas By Mayor John Jay Lee http://www.fatbmx.com/bmx/news/article.php?storyid=31544
- In 2014 Laguna grace the cover of Las Vegas Man Magazine http://www.lasvegasmanmagazine.com/summer-2014-digital-magazine/
- In 2014 Laguna created Hispanic Festival at the Clark County Amphitheater
- In 2014 Laguna had his home remodel by the cast of The Vanilla Ice Project Albert and Leon for the reality TV series "Amish Renogades" DIY Network
- In 2015 Laguna was awarded one of the most influential Twitter people of Las Vegas by Carolyn Goodman
- In 2015 Laguna appear on A&E (TV channel) TV show "Driving Vegas"

== The Ricardo Laguna Project ==
In late 2011, Tr3s and MTV production greenlighted a reality television show focusing on Ricardo's life in Las Vegas. Executive produced by Wilmer Valderrama, it premiered on March 14, 2012 on Tr3s.

== Personal life ==
At the age of 13, he relocated to Las Vegas, where he currently resides. In 2011, his hometown of La Paz opened a new BMX dirt park named after him. Outside of competitive riding, Ricardo also designs dirt tracks and jumps for "The Ricardo Laguna Pro BMX Dirt Challenge" held every year at Extreme Thing in Las Vegas.
