= Legacy High School (North Las Vegas, Nevada) =

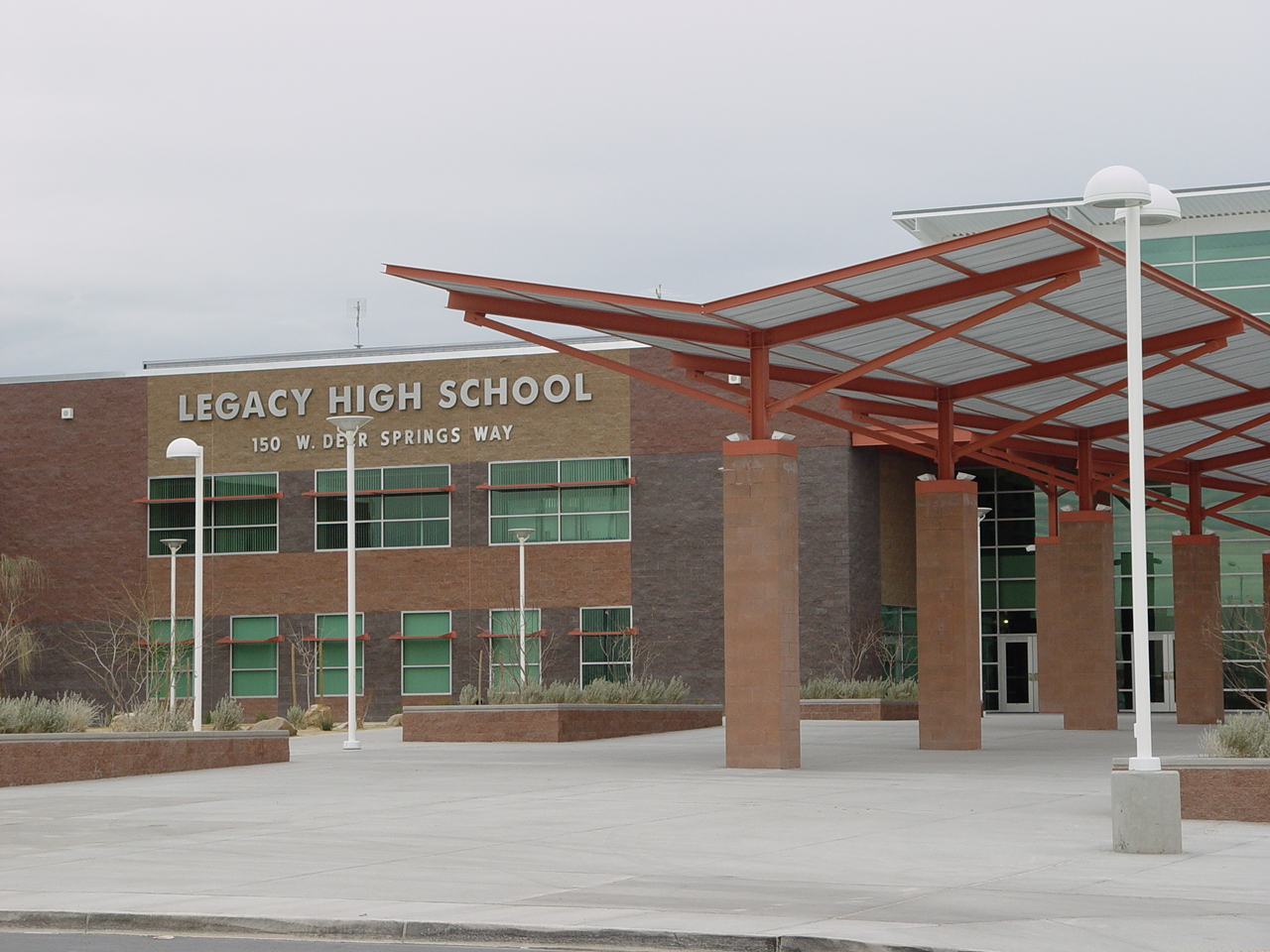

Location
- 150 W. Deer Springs Way; North Las Vegas, NV, 89084; 36.2857°N 115.1441°W

Information
- School type: Public high school
- Motto: "A World of Learning, A World of Difference"
- Established: 2006
- School district: Clark County School District
- Principal: Belinda Marentic
- Staff: 98.00 (FTE)
- Grades: 9-12
- Enrollment: 2,640 (2023-2024)
- Student to teacher ratio: 26:1
- Colours: Navy Blue, White, and Burnt Orange
- Athletics conference: Sunset 4A Region
- Team name: Longhorns
- Rival: Arbor View High School
- Website: www.legacyhigh.net

Legacy High School is a high school in North Las Vegas, Nevada that opened in 2006. It is part of the Clark County School District, The school opened with an enrollment of 1,820 and currently has an enrollment of 2,980. Legacy High School describes itself as an institution that will provide quality educational opportunities in order to prepare students to graduate and thrive in a globally diverse and competitive society. When the school opened during the 2006-07 school year, Legacy offered Arabic as one of its world languages courses, the first high school in Nevada to do so. The program has since been discontinued.

== Extracurricular activities ==
=== Athletics ===
The athletic program that represents Legacy is known as the Longhorns and compete in the Southwest Division of the Sunset 4A Region. Much of the schools athletic logos and uniforms are based on those used by athletic department at the University of Texas, Austin. Legacy High School's biggest rivalry is with Arbor View High School. Their most prized possession is "The Horns" trophy. This rivalry game is also known as "The Battle of the Bulls", first coined by the class of 2008 student council.

The 2009 Legacy football team won the school's first division championship, finishing the season 11-0 and 8-0 in the Northwest Division. The wins included a 7–6 victory over perennial powerhouse Palo Verde. Legacy would go on to lose in the Sunset 4A Region semifinals to Cimarron-Memorial, 21–20.

==== Sunset 4A Region - Northwest Division Championships ====
- Football - 2009
- Baseball - 2010
- Softball - 2010
- Men's Soccer - 2010, 2011, 2012, 2015
- Flag Football - 2014, 2015
- Men's Volleyball - 2014, 2015

==== Sunset 4A Region - Sunset Region Championships ====
- Men's Soccer - 2010, 2011
- Men's Volleyball - 2014, 2015

==== Sunset 4A Region - State Championships ====
- Men's Soccer- 2010, 2011
- Men's Volleyball- 2014
