= Mojave High School =

Location
- 5302 Goldfield Street; North Las Vegas, Nevada 89031; United States; 36°15′21″N 115°8′15″W

Information
- Type: Public
- Motto: "Success Nothing Less"
- Established: 1996; 30 years ago
- School district: Clark County School District
- NCES School ID: 320006000445
- Principal: Greg Cole
- Teaching staff: 107.00 (FTE)
- Grades: 9-12
- Enrollment: 2,487 (2024-2025)
- Student to teacher ratio: 23.24
- Campus type: Metropolitan
- Colors: Green, Orange, and White
- Mascot: Rattlesnake
- Nickname: Rattlers
- Website: www.iamrattlernation.com

Mojave High School, is a nine-month public high school that is part of Clark County School District located in North Las Vegas, Nevada. After a year of sharing a campus at Cheyenne High School on a "double session" schedule where Cheyenne students attended from 6 am to 12 pm and Mojave students attended 1 pm to 7 pm (while Mojave was under construction), the inaugural class, class of 2000, were the only class to not have an upper-class. The school began with only the Freshman class, who became the first graduating class in 2000.

It is the zoned school for Nellis Air Force Base.

== Athletics ==
Mojave High School offers many different athletic teams including football, baseball, softball, soccer, swimming, tennis, golf, cross-country, wrestling, basketball, bowling, cheerleading, dance, and volleyball. They compete in the Sunset 3A Region of the Nevada Interscholastic Activities Association.

== Notable alumni ==
- Sequoia Holmes, basketballer in the WNBA
- Ronnie Radke, singer
- Max Green, bassist
