= Rancho High School =

Public high school in North Las Vegas, Nevada

- Rancho High School

Location
- 1900 Searles Avenue; North Las Vegas, Nevada 89101
- Coordinates: 36°11′08″N 115°07′21″W

Information
- School type: Public high school
- Motto: "Students and Teachers Achieving Real Success"
- Established: 1953
- School district: Clark County School District
- Area trustee: Brenda Zamora
- Principal: Norman Smith
- Teaching staff: 108.00 (FTE)
- Grades: 9-12
- Enrollment: 2,994 (2023-2024)
- Student to teacher ratio: 27.72
- Colours: Green and white
- Athletics conference: Sunrise 4A Region
- Team name: Rams
- Publication: Rampage
- Website: Rancho Rams High School

Rancho High School, established in 1953 in North Las Vegas, Nevada, is the second-oldest public high school in the Las Vegas Valley. It is part of the Clark County School District and offers a range of academic, athletic and extracurricular programs. Rancho is known for its historic athletic traditions, including its longstanding football rivalry with Las Vegas High School, called the “Bone Game”, which is the oldest high school football rivalry in Nevada. Over the years, the school has served a diverse student body and continues to provide comprehensive educational opportunities in the region.

== Athletics ==
Rancho High School engages in a yearly football "Bone Game" against Las Vegas High School, with the tradition forming the oldest rivalry game in Nevada.

=== Nevada Interscholastic Activities Association state championships ===
- Baseball – 1959, 1960, 1961, 1965, 1969, 1973, 1974, 1976
- Football – 1958, 1960, 1961, 1962, 1988
- Volleyball (Girls) – 1985, 1986, 2021
- Basketball (Boys) - 1961, 1973, 1977, 1986

== Notable alumni ==
- Greg Anthony – former UNLV and NBA basketball player, former CBS Sports analyst
- Marty Barrett – former MLB baseball player
- Tom Barrett – former MLB baseball infielder
- Larry Beasley - city planner, professor, author
- Olivia Diaz - Las Vegas councilwoman
- Lionel Hollins – former NBA player, assistant NBA coach
- Steve Kazor – former college coach, NFL scout
- Ruben Kihuen – former U.S. Representative
- Joe Lombardo – Governor of Nevada, 17th Sheriff of Clark County
- Mike Maddux – former MLB baseball pitcher, pitching coach
- Mike Pritchard - former NFL wide receiver
- John Welch - assistant NBA basketball coach
- Terri Foley - assistant news director, KTNV Channel 13
