= Eldorado High School (Nevada) =

Location
- 1139 Linn Lane; Las Vegas, NV, 89110; 36°10′45″N 115°2′55″W

Information
- School type: Public high school
- Established: 1973
- School district: Clark County School District
- Principal: Isair Ramirez
- Teaching staff: 95.00 (FTE)
- Grades: 9–12
- Enrollment: 1,926 (2024-2025)
- Student to teacher ratio: 20.27
- Colors: Maroon & gold
- Athletics conference: Sunrise 4A Region
- Team name: Firehawks
- Rivals: Chaparral
- Publication: Sparky Gazette
- Yearbook: Sunburst
- Website: School website

Eldorado High School is a public high school in Clark County, Nevada, United States. The school is a part of the Clark County School District, located in Sunrise Manor, an unincorporated area on the northeast part of the Las Vegas Valley, south of Nellis Air Force Base. Its team mascot is the Firehawks and its school colors are maroon and gold.

== History ==
Eldorado High School was established in 1973 on an open desert lot just west of the Las Vegas Wash between Washington and Bonanza Roads. The school opened in September 1973 along with Chaparral High School, which brought the total number of major high schools in the Las Vegas Valley to eight, including Bishop Gorman, a private Catholic high school. For the first 15 years, Eldorado's zoning covered all of the Sunrise Mountain area north of Charleston Boulevard and east of Pecos Road, which resulted in a total school attendance of more than 2,000. The largest known class to graduate from Eldorado to date was in 1985, graduating about 550 students). The majority of the students are former students of Dell H. Robison Middle School, O'Callaghan Middle School, Monaco Middle School and Bailey Middle School. In the 1980s, Eldorado received former students from Robison and Von Tobel Middle Schools as well as a handful from Roy Martin Middle School. Today, its zoning border covers areas east of Nellis Boulevard, north of Bonanza Road and south of Owens Avenue.

== School layout ==
Its campus is bordered by Washington Avenue, Linn Lane, Harris Avenue and Christy Lane, built with an enclosed building (no windows), an American football stadium with an asphalt running track (one of the first high schools in Las Vegas to have such a track) and a state of the art "sportatorium", used for basketball, volleyball and wrestling as well as assemblies and other school-related activities. Three other Las Vegas area schools were built this way: Basic High School, Bonanza High School and the Southeast Career Technical Academy (also known as Vo-Tech); all built in the early to mid-1970s along with Eldorado. Basic and Bonanza were built according to the same blueprints as Eldorado.

In 2007, the former facilities of Bishop Gorman were purchased by CCSD to house the rising number of freshmen and to ease overcrowding at the main campus. Eldorado Preparatory Academy, the name of the temporary ninth grade campus, closed in spring 2009 when students were rezoned to Sunrise Mountain High School.

== Extracurricular activities ==
The Firehawks compete in the Sunrise 4A Region and are classified as a 4A school, the largest classification in Nevada according to the Nevada Interscholastic Activities Association.

=== Athletics ===
==== Wrestling ====
One of the most successful athletics program at Eldorado has been wrestling; the school has won 12 state championships. The Sundevils were ranked 12th of the High School Scholastic Dynasty Teams of the Last Decade.

==== Other sports ====
The school has held a state championship in each of American football (1992), boys' basketball (1985), baseball (1990) and soccer (2013). Eldorado also holds Nevada state championships in track and field.

==== Naval Junior Reserve Officers Training Corps ====
Eldorado High School's Naval Junior Reserve Officers Training Corps (NJROTC) Unit, established not long after the school opened, is a part of Naval District 13, and has received multiple awards recognizing the Sundevil Battalion as both an Honor Unit (top 10% of units in the Naval District) and a Chief of Naval Education and Training Command Honor Unit (top 10% of all NJROTC Units) over the years.

=== Nevada Interscholastic Activities Association State championships ===
- American football – 1991
- Baseball – 1990
- Basketball (boys) – 1985
- Basketball (girls) – 1978
- Cross country (boys) – 1979, 1980, 1981
- Track & field – 1988, 1990, 1991, 1992
- Soccer (boys) - 2013
- Wrestling – 1980, 1981, 1982, 1986, 1987, 1988, 1989, 1990, 1991, 1992, 1993, 1995

=== The Merlin Olsen Cleat ===
Every year, since 1974, Eldorado and Chaparral hold their rivalry game, in which the winner takes possession of a bronzed cleat once owned by the former Los Angeles Rams star Merlin Olsen.

== Notable alumni ==
- Arianny Celeste — UFC ring girl and fitness model
- Leah Dizon — singer and model
- Casey Kingsland — NASCAR driver
- Ricardo Laguna — BMX professional
- Eric Ludwick — baseball player for the Oakland Athletics, St. Louis Cardinals, Florida Marlins
- Brandon Rock — US track and field NCAA 800 meter champion, participated in the 1996 Olympics at Atlanta
- Steven Jackson — running back for the St. Louis Rams, Atlanta Falcons, New England Patriots
- Sandra Douglass Morgan — president of the Las Vegas Raiders

== Notable faculty ==
- Lisa Cano Burkhead, assistant principal and 36th Lieutenant Governor of Nevada.
