= Arbor View High School =

Location
- 7500 Whispering Sands Drive; Las Vegas, Nevada 89131; United States; 36°18′10″N 115°15′28″W

Information
- Type: Public
- Motto: 'Think. Do. Succeed.'
- Established: 2005
- School district: Clark County School District
- Principal: Duane Bickmore
- Teaching staff: 123.00 (FTE)
- Enrollment: 3,177 (2023–2024)
- Student to teacher ratio: 25.83
- Colors: Red, grey, white
- Mascot: Aggie (bull)
- Website: http://www.arborviewhs.org/

Arbor View High School is a high school in northwestern unincorporated Clark County, Nevada, United States that opened in 2005. It is part of the Clark County School District. The school was built on 40 acres of land previously owned by the nearby Gilcrease Orchard, which became the namesake of the 'Arbor View Aggies' for its 'tree-lined views'.

== Architecture ==
Arbor View was built at a total cost of $54 million, with construction beginning in March 2004 and completion occurring in August 2005. At completion it formed the largest school in the district, with a campus area of 40 acres (16 ha) and four buildings with a total of 330,000 sq ft (31,000 m^{2}) of floor space. It was one of ten new schools that opened in the school district in 2005, one of the fastest-growing school zones in the nation.

Arbor View High School is an architectural prototype, featuring a mall-style design with four two-story corner "houses" and a shared central esplanade. The layout is intended to help foster the feeling of a "small school environment", in the words of interim co-superintendent Walt Rulffes, even though it is by far the largest school in the history of the Clark County district. The structure is more energy-efficient than existing schools within the district. Additionally, portable classrooms are used to maintain the increasing number of students enrolling at the school each year.

The design for this school received a 2005 AIA Nevada Excellence in Design Award merit award for a completed structure. The architecture was designed by the Tate Snyder Kimsey Architects.

== Programs and academics ==
=== Model UN ===
Arbor View is one of many high schools across the U.S. that has a Model United Nations program, which allows students to create a mock United Nations council, competing against other schools' Model UN teams in various debates and events.

=== Speech and debate ===
The Arbor View speech and debate team has competed in various competitions. During their 2023 season, the program competed in the Nevada state championship, finishing second place in US Extemporaneous Speaking, third in Duo Interpretation, fourth in International Extemporaneous Speaking, and sixth in Humorous Interpretation.

== Student organizations ==
Arbor View features multiple different student organizations, including the Asian Student Organization, Black Student Union, Japanese Activities Club, Korean Activities Club, and The Filipino Club (TFC).

== Sports facilities ==
The school is one of three in Las Vegas that has a synthetic turf football field. It is a grassy style turf that is the exact type that is used in the NFL. This cuts down on facilities used in order to maintain the large field.

== Athletics ==
=== Football ===
The Aggies have been a 5A Desert Region team since 2021. Since 2011, the Arbor View Aggies have ranked as one of the Top 4 teams in the state of Nevada. The team received Mountain Region Titles in 2018, and has earned Northwest Division Titles in 2018, 2017, 2016, 2015, 2014, and 2012.

=== Track and field ===
The Arbor View Girls Track and Field Team won the NIAA Nevada State Championships in the 4A division during their 2023-2024 season.

=== Volleyball ===
The Aggie Boys Varsity Volleyball team ranked third in the Nevada 5A Division and ranked fourth in the state as of 2024.

The Aggie Girls Varsity Volleyball team ranked eighth in the Nevada 5A Division and ranked ninth in the state as of 2023.

=== Marching band ===
The Arbor View 'Aggie' Marching Band, previously known as the Arbor View High School Outdoor Performance Ensemble, is the second largest marching band in the State of Nevada.

The Arbor View Marching Band is a Bands of America seven time finalists Including twice during the 2023 marching season at the Southern California Regional Championship and the Arizona Regional Championship at Northern Arizona University. The Aggie Marching Band won the Southern Nevada MBOS Championship Finals on November 10, 2018 with a first place score of 90.15 and the Nevada Marching Band Circuit Champions (2021).

== Notable alumni ==
- Nehemiah Kauffman (c.1996–2016), victim of unsolved shooting
- Peyton Prussin, professional wrestler known best as Kendal Grey
