= Sierra Vista High School (Nevada) =

Coordinates: 36°03′01.40″N 115°16′04.12″W

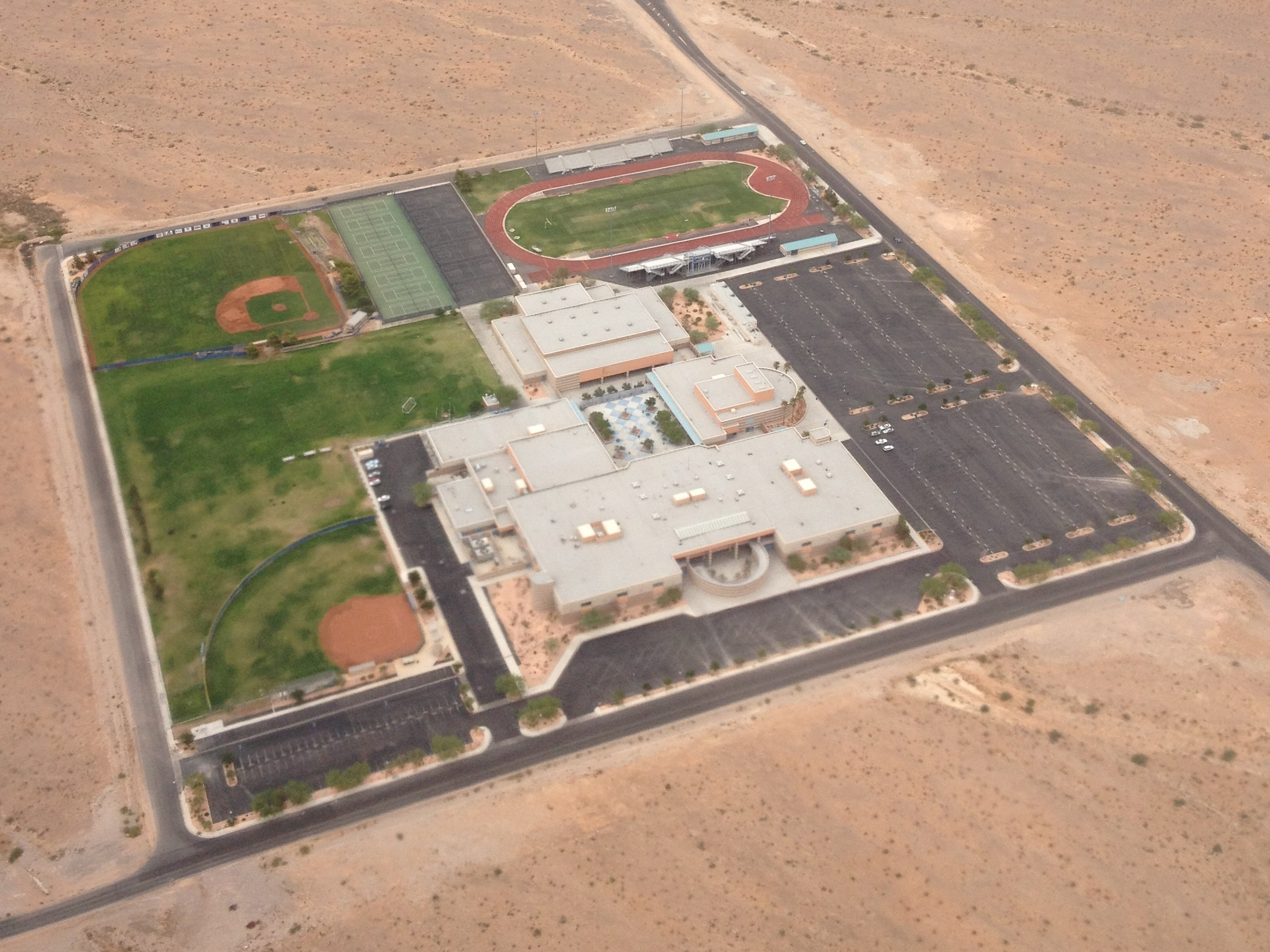
- Sierra Vista, as viewed from the air
- 8100 West Robindale Road; Las Vegas, Nevada 89113; United States

Information
- Type: Public high school
- Motto: "Perseverance Respect Involvement Determination Excellence - P.R.I.D.E" along with "Fortitude Attitude Integrity Respect - F.A.I.R"
- Established: 2001; 25 years ago
- Locale: Enterprise, Nevada
- School district: Clark County School District (CCSD)
- Principal: Jessica Lovell
- Staff: 133.00 (FTE)
- Grades: 9-12
- Enrollment: 3,255 (2024-2025)
- Student to teacher ratio: 24.47
- Colors: Blue and gold
- Athletics conference: Sunset 4A Region
- Mascot: Mountain Lions
- Rival: Desert Oasis High School
- Music Department: BOA Marching Band Regional Champions
- Website: Sierra Vista High School

Sierra Vista High School is a nine-month school year term public high school located in Spring Valley, Nevada, United States. Sierra Vista is a part of the Clark County School District.

== Band ==
The school's marching band won the 2007 Bands of America Regional Championships held in Flagstaff, Arizona. SVHS was the first Nevada high school to win the regional championship.

== Notable alumni ==
- Chris Carter: Professional Baseball Player
- Sophia Omotola Omidiji: Professional Women's Soccer Player
- Jake Hager: Baseball Player
- Nick Kingham: Baseball Player
- Bryan Le (RiceGum): American YouTuber/Influencer
