= North Las Vegas, Nevada =

City in Nevada, United States

- City
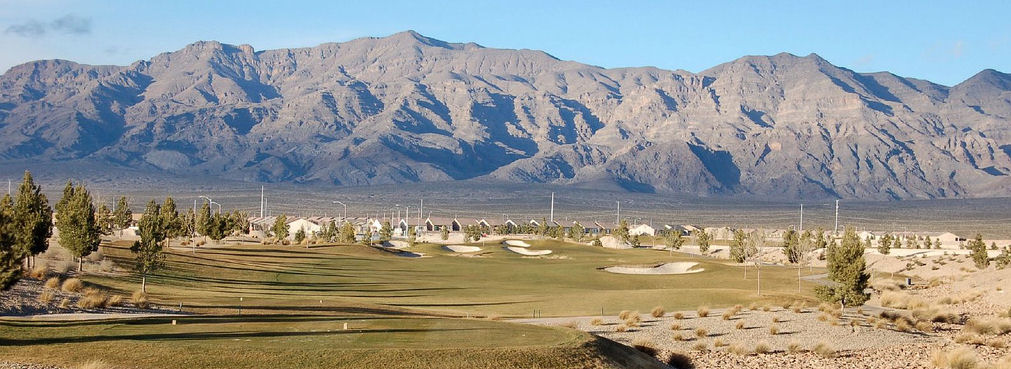
- North Las Vegas and the surrounding Las Vegas Range

- Flag Seal
- Nicknames: North Town
- Motto: Your Community of Choice
- Location within Clark County

- Location within Nevada Location within the United States
- Coordinates: 36°13′43″N 115°8′48″W
- Country: United States
- State: Nevada
- County: Clark
- Founded: 1919; 107 years ago
- Incorporated: May 1, 1946; 80 years ago

Government
  - Type: Council–manager
  - Mayor: Pamela Goynes-Brown (D)
  - City manager: Ryann Juden

Area
  - Total: 102.37 sq mi (265.13 km^{2})
  - Land: 102.32 sq mi (265.02 km^{2})
  - Water: 0.042 sq mi (0.11 km^{2})
- Elevation: 2,205 ft (672 m)

Population (2020)
  - Total: 262,527
  - Estimate (2025): 296,653 ▲
  - Density: 2,566/sq mi (990.6/km^{2})
- Time zone: UTC−8 (PST)
  - Summer (DST): UTC−7 (PDT)
- ZIP codes: 89030–89033, 89036, 89081, 89084–89087
- Area codes: 702 and 725
- FIPS code: 32-51800
- GNIS feature ID: 0847435
- Website: www.cityofnorthlasvegas.com

North Las Vegas is a suburban city in Clark County, Nevada, United States, in the Las Vegas Valley. As of the 2020 census, it had a population of 262,527, with an estimated population of 296,653 in 2025. The city was incorporated on May 1, 1946. It is the 4th most populous city in the state of Nevada, and the 73rd most populous city in the United States.

== History ==
=== Prehistory ===
Native Americans were the first to inhabit the area. Paiute Indians settled in the area in around 700 AD.

=== Early history (1860s–1946) ===
During the 1860s, Conrad Kiel established a ranch at the modern-day intersection of Carey Street and Losee Road in what would be North Las Vegas. In 1917, libertarian Thomas L. Williams of Eureka, Utah visited the Las Vegas Valley, back when Las Vegas, Las Vegas Indian Colony, and Arden were the only entities in the valley. He did not approve of Las Vegas, perhaps because of its rowdiness (he was a Christian, or at least went to church), or because Las Vegas' attempts at municipal control over its citizens. However, he was pleased by the abundance of the valley's artesian water and potential for agriculture. Two years later in 1919, he moved together with his family (his wife and three sons) to a 160-acre piece of land a mile from Las Vegas. That year, he founded his town, developing the town by building for himself and his family a house, sinking a well, grading roads, extending power lines, and forming a system of irrigation ditches. Williams believed that churches and church people should govern the new town, and so encouraged churches to buy property in the town. In 1919, the federally enforced Volstead Act was passed, which prohibited the sale, possession, and consumption of alcohol. Since there was no local law against alcohol, and because of a system of tunnels that would connect the town's underground speakeasies, the town attracted bootleggers from Las Vegas, although Williams was initially unaware of this. This gave his town the nickname of "Old Town". When he did discover it, he stuck with agriculture for his economic purposes.

In 1924, Williams built his second house that was the first business of the town. It was named the Oasis Auto Court, and it contained a grocery store, a campground, a post office, a community center, and a telephone. At the time, it was the town's only telephone. Between 1928 and 1935, a large influx of workers from the Hoover Dam settled in Williams' town, as Las Vegas was intolerant towards them. In 1932, the town board was created. That same year, the town's first grammar school, Washington School, opened. A proper name had not yet been established for the town, and Williams did not want it named after himself, which lead to the town board voting for either "North Las Vegas" or "Vegas Verdes" (which means "Green Meadows" in Spanish). "Vegas Verdes" won, and that became the name for the town for a few months. George Hansen, a town board member who voted for the name "North Las Vegas", noticed that at one town board meeting, two members who voted the name "Vegas Verdes" were absent. The vote for a name came once again, and "North Las Vegas" won. In 1939, Williams died of stroke, and that left North Las Vegas to the ruling of the town board. An elementary school, and a road, were eventually named after him. During World War II, the Las Vegas Aerial Gunnery School opened in North Las Vegas. It would eventually become Nellis Air Force Base. North Las Vegas was the subject of many annexation attempts from Las Vegas.

=== Incorporation (1946–present) ===
On May 1, 1946, North Las Vegas was incorporated as a city. In 1957, North Las Vegas planned to annex an area to its southeast, and in response, the Clark County Commission created the town of Sunrise Manor to prevent further annexation attempts.

On May 13, 1964, First Lieutenant Raynor Lee Hebert, a student pilot from Port Arthur, Texas, took off from Nellis Air Force Base at approximately 2:00 PM on an F-105 fighter jet. He radioed his flight leader saying that he could not retract his nose gear, and thus could not gain altitude. He was at a height high enough to bail out, but so low that if he did, he would have hit Lincoln Elementary School, which was in session with 800 students. He kept the plane nose up long enough to pass the school, and eventually hit nine residential houses on Lenwood Avenue. The crash killed Hebert and four civilians. Hebert Memorial Park was created by the City of North Las Vegas with a plaque at the crash site to commemorate Hebert.

In the early 1960s, North Las Vegas had a major growth boom. The 1970s in North Las Vegas saw a growth in poor neighborhoods, population density, and crime. In 1988, former mayor James Seastrand said in one interview,

There are those of us who live here and care for this city and would not move out of it — even though we could afford to.

— James Seastrand

In the 1990s, North Las Vegas annexed about 60 square miles (160 km^{2}) of empty desert surrounding the city, reportedly for more "upscale" housing.

On January 29, 2022, nine people were killed and a tenth person was critically injured following a six-vehicle crash at the intersection of Cheyenne Avenue and Commerce Street in North Las Vegas. The crash occurred after a speeding Dodge Challenger ran a red light and struck the other five vehicles. The road accident—the deadliest in the area in recent history—was investigated by the National Transportation Safety Board.

== Geography ==
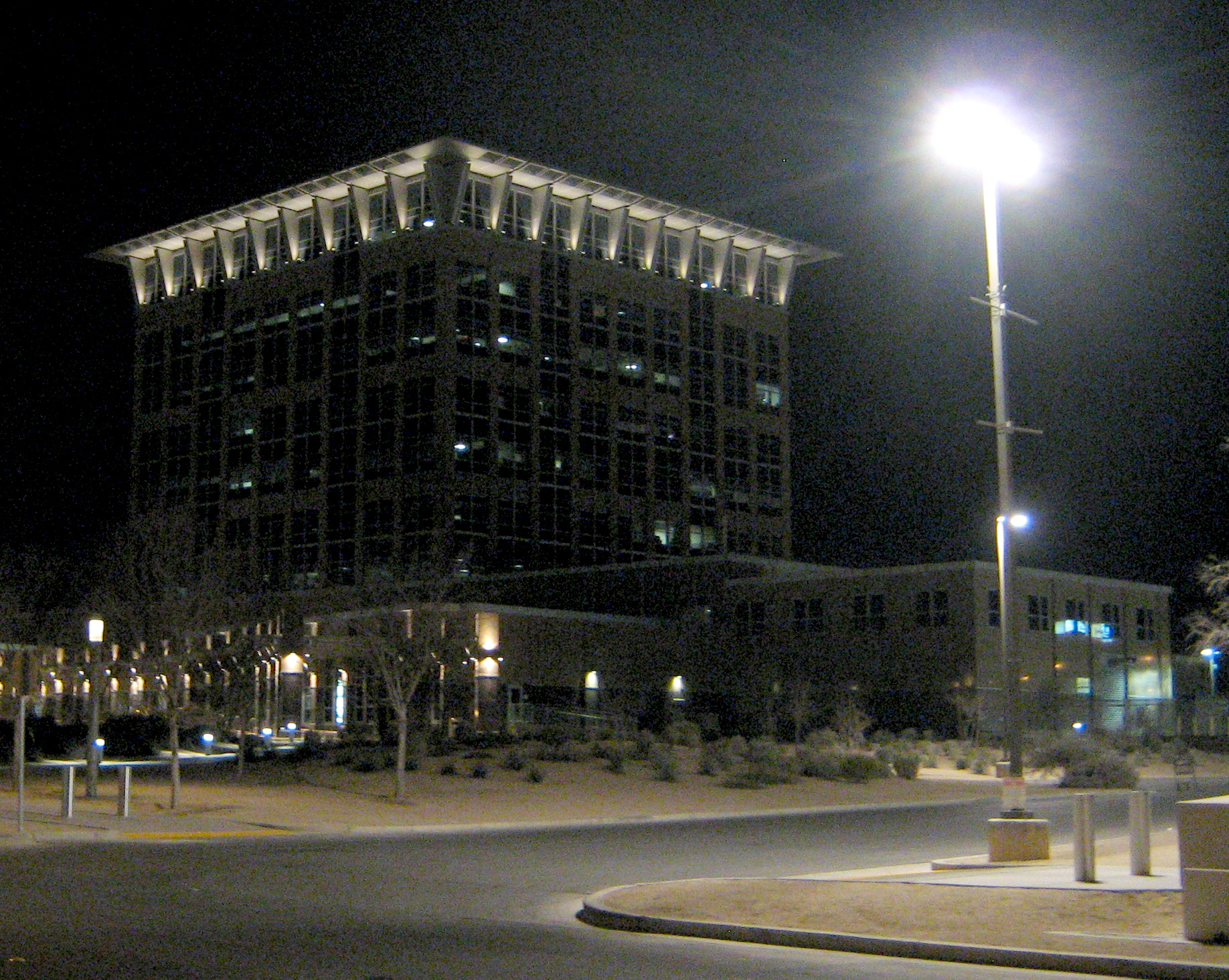
North Las Vegas City Hall at Night, February 2013

Located within the Mojave Desert in the southwestern United States, North Las Vegas sits northeast of Las Vegas. According to the United States Census Bureau, North Las Vegas has a total area of 101.4 square miles (262.6 km^{2}), of which 0.04 square miles (0.1 km^{2}), or 0.04%, is water. In the Las Vegas Valley, there are several prominent mountain ranges nearby.

=== Climate ===
Due to its location within the Mojave Desert, North Las Vegas has a desert climate. Temperatures are generally mild in the winter and hot in the summer. Like most of the hot deserts of the United States, snowfall only occurs once every few years on average. In winter, temperatures are mild during the day but typically fall below freezing overnight. In the summer, monsoons can reach the area, bringing heavy rain and thunderstorms.

Climate data for North Las Vegas, Nevada
Month	Jan	Feb	Mar	Apr	May	Jun	Jul	Aug	Sep	Oct	Nov	Dec	Year
Record high °F (°C)	80 (27)	86 (30)	93 (34)	100 (38)	112 (44)	117 (47)	119 (48)	115 (46)	116 (47)	101 (38)	88 (31)	77 (25)	119 (48)
Mean daily maximum °F (°C)	58 (14)	64 (18)	71 (22)	80 (27)	89 (32)	100 (38)	105 (41)	103 (39)	95 (35)	83 (28)	68 (20)	59 (15)	81 (27)
Mean daily minimum °F (°C)	30 (−1)	35 (2)	40 (4)	47 (8)	56 (13)	64 (18)	71 (22)	69 (21)	61 (16)	49 (9)	37 (3)	30 (−1)	49 (9)
Record low °F (°C)	10 (−12)	16 (−9)	21 (−6)	31 (−1)	41 (5)	48 (9)	59 (15)	54 (12)	45 (7)	25 (−4)	17 (−8)	11 (−12)	10 (−12)
Average precipitation inches (mm)	0.64 (16)	0.68 (17)	0.65 (17)	0.21 (5.3)	0.26 (6.6)	0.08 (2.0)	0.30 (7.6)	0.49 (12)	0.27 (6.9)	0.29 (7.4)	0.33 (8.4)	0.38 (9.7)	4.58 (116)

== Demographics ==
Historical population
Census	Pop.	Note	%±
1940	3,875		—
1950	3,875		0.0%
1960	18,422		375.4%
1970	36,216		96.6%
1980	42,739		18.0%
1990	47,707		11.6%
2000	115,488		142.1%
2010	216,961		87.9%
2020	262,527		21.0%
2025 (est.)	296,653	▲	13.0%
U.S. Decennial Census

=== 2020 census ===
North Las Vegas, Nevada – racial and ethnic composition Note: the US Census treats Hispanic/Latino as an ethnic category. This table excludes Latinos from the racial categories and assigns them to a separate category. Hispanics/Latinos may be of any race.
Race / ethnicity (NH = Non-Hispanic)	Pop 2000	Pop 2010	Pop 2020	% 2000	% 2010	% 2020
White alone (NH)	42,880	67,687	64,187	37.13%	31.20%	24.45%
Black or African American alone (NH)	21,528	41,561	56,049	18.64%	19.16%	21.35%
Native American or Alaska Native alone (NH)	565	871	807	0.49%	0.40%	0.31%
Asian alone (NH)	3,604	13,122	16,861	3.12%	6.05%	6.42%
Pacific Islander alone (NH)	547	1,684	2,550	0.47%	0.78%	0.97%
Other race alone (NH)	143	377	1,437	0.12%	0.17%	0.55%
Mixed-race or multiracial (NH)	2,786	7,525	13,696	2.41%	3.47%	5.22%
Hispanic or Latino (any race)	43,435	84,134	106,940	37.61%	38.78%	40.73%
Total	115,488	216,961	262,527	100.00%	100.00%	100.00%

=== 2010 US census ===
At the census of 2010, there were 216,961 people residing in North Las Vegas. The racial makeup was 47.4% White, 19.9% African American, 0.8% Native American, 6.3% Asian, 0.8% Pacific Islander, and 5.8% from two or more races. Hispanic or Latino residents of any race were 38.8% of the population, and 31.2% of the population was non-Hispanic White.

=== 2000 US census ===
As of the 2000 census, there were 115,488 people, 34,018 households, and 27,112 families residing in the city. The population density was 1,471.0 inhabitants per square mile (568.0/km^{2}). There were 36,600 housing units at an average density of 466.2 per square mile (180.0/km^{2}). The racial makeup of the city was 55.93% White, 19.02% African American, 0.82% Native American, 3.24% Asian, 0.53% Pacific Islander, 15.78% from other races, and 4.68% from two or more races. 37.61% were Hispanic or Latino of any race.

There were 34,018 households, out of which 47.8% had children under the age of 18 living with them, 57.3% were married couples living together, 15.2% had a female householder with no husband present, and 20.3% were non-families. 13.6% of all households were made up of individuals, and 3.2% had someone living alone who was 65 years of age or older. The average household size was 3.36 and the average family size was 3.67.

In the city the population was spread out, with 33.9% under the age of 18, 9.6% from 18 to 24, 34.3% from 25 to 44, 16.4% from 45 to 64, and 5.8% who were 65 years of age or older. The median age was 29 years. For every 100 females, there were 104.3 males. For every 100 females age 18 and over, there were 103.1 males.

The median income for a household in the city was $46,057, and the median income for a family was $46,540. Males had a median income of $32,205 versus $25,836 for females. About 11.8% of families and 14.8% of the population were below the poverty line, including 19.6% of those under age 18 and 8.8% of those age 65 or over. The United States Census Bureau listed North Las Vegas, as well as the Las Vegas metropolitan area, as one of the fastest-growing regions in the United States.

== Economy ==
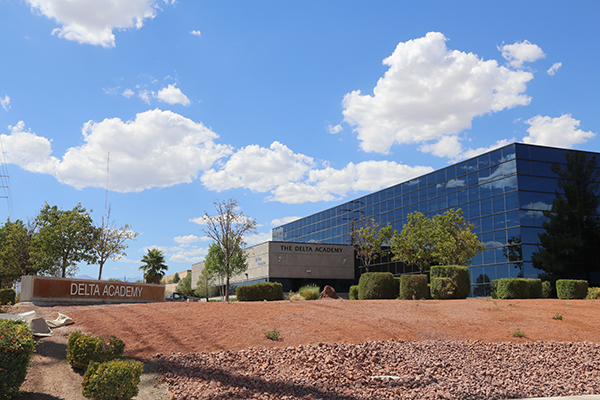
Delta Academy in North Las Vegas

Bigelow Aerospace is headquartered in North Las Vegas. Traditionally, manufacturing, industrial and warehouse distribution companies have dominated the local market. High-tech businesses, including solar and green technology, and custom manufacturing facilities are moving to North Las Vegas.

On May 12, 2019, Amazon opened a 850,000-square-foot fulfillment center in North Las Vegas which currently employs more than 1,500 people. In October 2019, Sephora opened a 715,000-square-foot distribution center in North Las Vegas.

As construction began on the nearby Brightline West highspeed railroad project, PCM Railone AG announced in June 2024 that they would build a production facility for concrete ties and open a North American headquarters in North Las Vegas.

Florence McClure Women's Correctional Center, Nevada's only female correctional facility, is located in North Las Vegas.

North Las Vegas has many medical/recreational marijuana dispensaries, and opened the first 24-hour dispensary in the Las Vegas Valley.

Master-planned communities in the city include Aliante and Eldorado. The Apex industrial Park is now a part of the city as well.

== Government ==
=== Mayor and council ===
The city of North Las Vegas provides recreational amenities, police and fire protection, and water and wastewater services. The city, which was incorporated in 1946, encompasses 262.6 square kilometres (101.4 sq mi). The city operates under a council-manager form of government, with a mayor and four council members. The mayor is elected at large, and council members must live within, and are elected by their wards. The city has two municipal judges who are elected at large.

=== City management ===
The city manager and city attorney are appointed by and report to the city council. The city manager's administration consists of an Economic Development Division, Strategic Planning Division, community Outreach Division, Communications and Marketing Division and the following departments: Administrative Services, City Clerk, Community Services and Development, Finance, Fire, Human Resources, Parks and Recreation, Police, Public Works, the North Las Vegas Library District, and Utilities.

The City of North Las Vegas operates an extensive system of open spaces, parks and leisure services. The city maintains 34 parks totaling more than 475 acres (192 ha) of developed park land. Six of the city's parks feature water amenities, including pools, ponds and spray pads. The city also runs two recreation centers.

In June 2011 the city opened a third recreation center—SkyView Multi-Generational Recreation Center—focused on mufti-generational fitness and recreation. It is operated by the YMCA under contract to provide quality amenities and programs for residents of all ages.

North Las Vegas park officials recently completed 10 miles (16 km) of regional trails along the Lower Las Vegas Wash and along the Upper Las Vegas Wash. These paved trails connect with Southern Nevada's Neon to Nature regional trail system, which is used for hiking, biking and leisurely strolls.

The North Las Vegas Library District operates three full-service libraries—North Las Vegas Library, Aliante Library and Alexander Library. Each offers public access computers, adult and children's programming and meeting rooms in addition to books, downloadable media, DVDs, magazines and newspapers. Each also provides wireless connectivity to the Web for patrons who wish to use their electronic devices.

The North Las Vegas Library was the city's first library to open in 1966. Aliante Library opened to the public in May 2006 adjacent to the Nature Discovery Park, one of the most popular recreation amenities in North Las Vegas. Alexander Library, the city's newest state-of-the-art facility, opened in March 2009 and is adjacent to a two-acre park that includes tot lots, shade structures, paved and lighted walking paths and demonstration gardens.

=== Police ===
The North Las Vegas Police Department was established in 1946 (when the city incorporated) to serve North Las Vegas, which at that time consisted of four square miles and a population of around 3,000. NLVPD grew to keep pace with the rapid growth of the city of North Las Vegas and Clark County. As of 2016, NLVPD provided law enforcement services to an area of 100.48 square miles (260.2 km2) and a population of approximately 233,808 citizens. As of July 2016, NLVPD had 309 commissioned personnel (police and detention officers) and 106 civilian support personnel.

== City presidential election results ==
North Las Vegas city presidential election results

North Las Vegas city presidential election results
Year	Democratic	Republican	Third parties
2024	60.00% 67,079	38.12% 42,620	1.88% 2,104
2020	64.19% 63,727	33.54% 33,297	2.27% 2,258
2016	64.18% 50,540	30.16% 23,748	5.66% 4,459
2012	70.10% 48,875	29.90% 20,873	0% 0
2008	69.40% 42,886	28.90% 17,858	1.80% 1,095

== Education ==
North Las Vegas is home to the Cheyenne Campus of the College of Southern Nevada. The institution covers an area of roughly 80 acres (32 ha) and provides for a broad variety of different courses. As of 2013, the University of Nevada, Las Vegas was planning to open a branch in North Las Vegas near the I-215 Beltway, though this plan had yet to be implemented as of 2022.

Primary and secondary school students in North Las Vegas are served by the Clark County School District (CCSD), the fifth-largest in the United States with over 300,000 students enrolled in any of its 357 schools. CCSD has a workforce of over 35,000 people, and is considered a major employer in the county.

The following high schools are in North Las Vegas:

- Canyon Springs
- Cheyenne
- Legacy
- Mojave
- Rancho

== Transportation ==
North Las Vegas Airport, formerly known as Sky Haven Airport, was established on December 7, 1941. A division of Vision Airlines operates tours to the Grand Canyon in Arizona from the airport.

RTC Transit provides bus service in the city, as it does throughout the Las Vegas metropolitan area.

== Culture ==
A wide range of different cultures have led to a number of diverse restaurants, including Mexican, Filipino, and fusion eateries.
