= Nevada Interscholastic Activities Association =

American high school athletic governing body

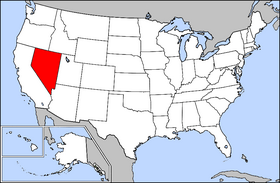
- Abbreviation: NIAA
- Formation: 1922
- Type: Volunteer; NPO
- Legal status: Association
- Purpose: Athletic/Educational
- Headquarters: 549 Court St. Reno, NV 89501
- Region served: Nevada
- Executive Director: Donnie Nelson
- Affiliations: National Federation of State High School Associations
- Staff: 20
- Website: niaa.com
- Remarks: (775) 453-1012

The Nevada Interscholastic Activities Association (NIAA) is the governing body of athletic programs for high schools in the U.S. state of Nevada. In addition, five schools in the state of California (Coleville, Needles, North Tahoe, South Tahoe, and Truckee) and one from Arizona (Beaver Dam) are also members as the schools are geographically isolated from other in-state schools.

It is a non-profit organization founded in 1922 as the Nevada Interscholastic League and became affiliated with the National Federation of State High School Associations in 1939. The league changed its name to the current form in 1967. The NIAA governs eligibility of student athletes, resolves disputes, organizes levels of competition by divisional separation of schools according to attendance population, and conducts state championship competitions in all the NIAA-sanctioned sports.

== NIAA sanctioned sports ==
The NIAA sponsors 24 sports, 13 for boys and 11 for girls. The seasons are broken down into three seasons (Fall, Winter, and Spring). The 24 sports are:

=== Boys ===

Fall

- Cross Country
- Football^{5}
- Soccer
- Tennis

Winter

- Basketball
- Bowling^{1}
- Skiing^{2}
- Wrestling^{5}

Spring

- Baseball
- Golf
- Swimming and Diving
- Track and Field
- Volleyball^{1}
=== Girls ===

Fall

- Cross Country
- Golf
- Soccer
- Tennis
- Volleyball

Winter

- Basketball
- Bowling^{1}
- Skiing^{2}
- Soccer
- Flag football^{1}

Spring

- Softball
- Swimming and Diving
- Track and Field

=== Notes ===
1 Only schools in Southern Nevada compete in this sport.
2 Only schools in Northern Nevada compete in this sport.
5 Girls may participate in the boys only sanctioned sports (football and wrestling), as there is no corresponding sport for them. However, they will play against males athletes if they do so.

== State Champions by Sport ==
This list includes state championship results for recent seasons for schools competing in the highest division existing in that year.

=== Fall ===
==== Cross Country ====
5A State Championship Results
Year	Boys Team Champion	Boys Individual Champion	Girls Team Champion	Girls Individual Champion
2026	Galena	David Coisson (SR, Galena)	Somerset Sky Pointe	Aislin McMahon (SR, Galena)
2025	Galena	Carter Prater (SR, Somerset Sky Pointe)	Faith Lutheran	Gioia Coudriet (SO, Galena)
2024	Shadow Ridge	Kenan Dagge (SR, Desert Oasis)	Shadow Ridge	Kambri Felsted (SR, Spanish Springs)
2023	Spanish Springs	Eric Ortega-Gammill (SR, Reno)	Carson	Amaya Aramini (SR, Bishop Manogue)
2022	Shadow Ridge	Logan Scott (SO, Faith Lutheran)	Carson	Eleanor Raker (SO, Galena)
2021	Reno	Nathan Carlin (SR, Foothill)	Galena	Eleanor Raker (FR, Galena)
2020	N/A - No season due to COVID-19			
2019	Centennial	Raymond Millero (SR, Faith Lutheran)	Coronado	Penelope Smerdon (JR, Reno)
2018	Centennial	Matthew Gordon (SO, Galena)	Centennial	Jazmin Felix (JR, Desert Pines)
2017	Spanish Springs	Andrew Ribeiro (SR, Spanish Springs)	Centennial	Alexis Melendrez (SR, Spanish Springs)
2016	Spanish Springs	Anthony Ocegueda (SR, Reed)	Reno	Samantha King-Shaw (SR, Reed)
2015	McQueen	Henry Weisberg (JR, McQueen)	Centennial	Karina Haymore (JR, Centennial)
2014	McQueen	Dajour Braxton (SR, Centennial)	Centennial	Lindsey Adams (SR, Douglas)
2013	Centennial	Kai Benedict (JR, McQueen)	Arbor View	Sydney Badger (SR, Centennial)
2012	Centennial	Jordan Cardenas (SR, Reno)	Coronado	Katie Gorczyca (JR, Palo Verde)
2011	Galena	Nick Hartle (SR, Centennial)	Carson	Lindsey Adams (FR, Douglas)

==== Football ====
5A State Championship Results
Year	Champions	Score	Runner-up	Venue
2025	Bishop Gorman	44-7	Arbor View	Allegiant Stadium
2024	Bishop Gorman	69-7	Arbor View	Allegiant Stadium
2023	Bishop Gorman	56-11	Liberty	Allegiant Stadium
2022	Bishop Gorman	70-6	Bishop Manogue	Carson H.S.
2021	Bishop Gorman	56-7	McQueen	Allegiant Stadium
2020	N/A - No season due to COVID-19			
2019	Liberty	50-7	Centennial	Sam Boyd Stadium
2018	Bishop Gorman	69-26	Bishop Manogue	Sam Boyd Stadium
2017	Bishop Gorman	48-7	Reed	Mackay Stadium
2016	Bishop Gorman	84-8	Liberty	Sam Boyd Stadium
2015	Bishop Gorman	62-21	Liberty	
2014	Bishop Gorman	70-28	Reed	Damonte Ranch H.S.
2013	Bishop Gorman	48-14	Reed	Sam Boyd Stadium
2012	Bishop Gorman	63-10	Liberty	Sam Boyd Stadium
2011	Bishop Gorman	72-28	Reed	Damonte Ranch H.S.
2010	Bishop Gorman	40-0	McQueen	Sam Boyd Stadium
2009	Bishop Gorman	21-28	McQueen	Mackey Stadium

==== Golf (Girls) ====
5A State Championship Results
Year	Team Champion	Individual Champion	Location
2026	Bishop Gorman	Sol Choi, Bishop Gorman	Wolf Run and LakeRidge
2025	Coronado	Samantha Harris, Bishop Gorman	Boulder City & Boulder Creek
2024	Coronado	Maddie Perez, Faith Lutheran	Boulder City
2023	Coronado	Ali Mulhall, Coronado	Mountain Falls
2022	Coronado	Brynn Kort, Coronado	Toiyabe
2021	Coronado	Yana Wilson, Coronado	Primm Valley
2020	N/A - No season due to COVID-19		
2019	Bishop Gorman	Riana Mission, Clark	TPC Summerlin
2018	Centennial	Gracie Olkowski, Faith Lutheran	Dayton Valley
2017	Coronado	Sydney Smith, Faith Lutheran	Highland Falls
2016	Coronado	Victoria Estrada, Coronado	Eagle Valley West
2015	Coronado	Annick hacziewicz, Palo Verde	Primm Valley
2014	Coronado	Katrina Prendergast, Spanish Springs	Somersett
2013	Spanish Springs	Katrina Prendergast, Spanish Springs	Bear's Best
2012	Spanish Springs	Alexandra Kaui, Green Valley	Wildcreek
2011	Green Valley	Alexandra Kaui, Green Valley	Bear's Best
2010	Green Valley	Alexandra Kaui, Green Valley	Hidden Valley

==== Soccer ====
Boys 5A State Championship Results
Year	Champion	Score	Runner-up	Venue
2026	Palo Verde	1–0	Arbor View	Faith Lutheran High School
2025	Coronado	2-1	Hug	Hug High School
2024	Coronado	3-0	Hug	Coronado High School
2023	Coronado	2-0	Palo Verde	Carson High School
2022	Bishop Gorman	2-1	Eldorado	Coronado High School
2021	Palo Verde	3-0	Hug	Spanish Springs High School
2020	N/A - No season due to COVID-19			
2019	Bishop Gorman	1-0	Eldorado	Hug High School
2018	Las Vegas	5-1	Coronado	Bettye Wilson
2017	Coronado	2-1	Wooster	North Valleys High School
2016	Galena	2-1, OT	Coronado	Bettye Wilson
2015	Carson	2-1, OT	Wooster	North Valleys High School
2014	Palo Verde	2-1	Valley	Heritage Park, Henderson
2013	Eldorado	2-0	Palo Verde	Carson High School
2012	Bishop Gorman	1-0	Green Valley	Heritage Park, Henderson

Girls 5A State Championship Results
Year	Champion	Score	Runner-up	Venue
2026	Bishop Gorman	2–1	Arbor View	Faith Lutheran
2025	Faith Lutheran	1-0, OT	Coronado	Valley High School
2024	Faith Lutheran	3-2, OT	Liberty	Coronado High School
2023	Coronado	2-1	Faith Lutheran	Coronado High School
2022	Faith Lutheran	1-0	Coronado	Coronado High School
2021	Faith Lutheran	1-0	Coronado	Spanish Springs High School
2020	N/A - No season due to COVID-19			
2019	Faith Lutheran	1-0	Coronado	Hug High School
2018	Bishop Gorman	4-0	Galena	Bettye Wilson
2017	Bishop Gorman	3-0	McQueen	North Valleys High School
2016	Arbor View	4-1	Palo Verde	Bettye Wilson
2015	Arbor View	2-0	Coronado	North Valleys High School
2014	Arbor View	6-0	Coronado	Heritage Park, Henderson
2013	Arbor View	3-0	Carson	Carson High School
2012	Arbor View	1-1 (4-3 SO)	Green Valley	Heritage Park, Henderson

==== Tennis ====
Boys

Boys 5A State Championship Results
Year	Team	Singles	Doubles
2026	Faith Lutheran	Tyson Young, Faith Lutheran	Davey Gluth/Michael Bergin, Faith Lutheran
2025	Faith Lutheran	Lucas Rago, Bishop Gorman	Beckham Butler/Sam Gastaldo, Faith Lutheran
2024	Faith Lutheran	Mark Lapko, Bishop Gorman	Beckham Butler/Nolan Dubay, Faith Lutheran
2023	Palo Verde	Mark Lapko, Bishop Gorman	Sanjeev Chundu/Pharrell Redmond, Clark
2022	Palo Verde	Mark Lapko, Bishop Gorman	Sam Fouse/Nolan Dubay, Faith Lutheran
2021	Faith Lutheran	Sanjeev Chundu, Clark	Nicco Ripamonti/Stephen Dobrev, Faith Lutheran
2020	N/A - No season due to COVID-19		
2019	Palo Verde	Michael Andre, Palo Verde	Blake Kasday/Chase Kasday, Bonanza
2018	Palo Verde	Michael Andre, Palo Verde	Blake Kasday/Chase Kasday, Bonanza
2017	Palo Verde	Axel Botticelli, Palo Verde	Michael Pasimio/Simran Shah, Clark
2016	Palo Verde	Ben Gajardo, Desert Oasis	Skyler Davidson/Sam Sholeff, Bishop Gorman
2015	Bishop Gorman	Dylan Levitt, Palo Verde	Sam Grant/Ryland McDermott, Coronado
2014	Palo Verde	Ben Gajardo, Desert Oasis	Skyler Davidson/Sam Sholeff, Bishop Gorman
2013	Coronado	Dylan Levitt, Bishop Gorman	Jack Vance/Jamie Vance, Coronado
2012	Coronado	Trevor Johnson, Palo Verde	Lucas Lee/Max Novak, Centennial
2011	Reno	Kris Yee, Clark	Ozzy Abraham/Tanner Berkabile, Palo Verde
2010	Palo Verde	Kris Yee, Clark	Ozzy Abraham/Tanner Berkabile, Palo Verde

Girls

Girls 5A State Championship Results
Year	Team	Singles	Doubles
2026	Faith Lutheran	Heidi Bergin, Faith Lutheran	Isabella Gallegos/Kamilah Saine, Coronado
2025	Coronado	Remi Rice, Palo Verde	Isabella Gallegos/Gigi Smart, Coronado
2024	Palo Verde	Remi Rice, Palo Verde	Isabella Gallegos/Gabriella Trentacosta, Coronado
2023	Palo Verde	Campbell Ricci, Palo Verde	Venus Tang/Ruth Robinson, Palo Verde
2022	Palo Verde	Caroline Lemcke, Palo Verde	Campbell Ricci/Mandalay LaBarre, Palo Verde
2021	Palo Verde	Jessica Bernales, Palo Verde	Cambell Ricci/Paisha Douglas, Palo Verde
2020	N/A - No season due to COVID-19		
2019	Palo Verde	Audrey Boch-Collins, Clark	Megan King/Sidra Wohlwend, Coronado
2018	Coronado	Audrey Boch-Collins, Clark	Ariana Stanciu/Andrada Stanciu, Sierra Vista
2017	Coronado	Audrey Boch-Collins, Clark	Isabella Shelton/Shelby Graber, Palo Verde
2016	Palo Verde	Audrey Boch-Collins, Clark	Emma Figueredo/Angelique Friedrich, Bishop Gorman
2015	Palo Verde	Angelique Friedrich, Bishop Gorman	Chloe Henderson/Sophie Henderson, Palo Verde
2014	Palo Verde	Samantha Smith, Coronado	Chloe Henderson/Sophie Henderson, Palo Verde
2013	Bishop Gorman	McKay Novak, Centennial	Chloe Henderson/Sophie Henderson, Palo Verde
2012	Bishop Gorman	Chelsea Crovetti, Bishop Gorman	Chloe Henderson/Kristen Newell, Palo Verde
2011	Bishop Gorman	Tiffany Tavares, Spring Valley	Amanda Brazell/Taler Brazell, The Meadows
2010	The Meadows	Gabriela Smith, Coronado	Aphrah Brokaw/Danae Ingwaldson, Liberty

==== Volleyball (Girls) ====
5A State Championship Results
Year	Champions	Score	Runner-up	Venue
2026	Bishop Gorman	3–1	Faith Lutheran	Virginia Street Gym
2025	Bishop Gorman	3-0	Coronado	Sunrise Mountain High School
2024	Bishop Gorman	3–0	Coronado	Spanish Springs High School
2023	Bishop Gorman	3–1	Coronado	Sunrise Mountain High School
2022	Coronado	3–0	Reno	Hug High School
2021	Bishop Gorman	3–0	Centennial	Faith Lutheran High School
2020	N/A - No season due to COVID-19			
2019	Bishop Gorman	3–1	Durango	Faith Lutheran High School
2018	Bishop Gorman	3–0	Reno	Bishop Manogue High School
2017	Shadow Ridge	3–2	Bishop Gorman	Faith Lutheran High School
2016	Bishop Gorman	3–1	Reno	Damonte Ranch High School
2015	Coronado	3–1	Bishop Manogue	Foothill High School
2014	Coronado	3–0	Shadow ridge	Galena High School
2013	Coronado	3–2	Palo Verde	Green Valley High School
2012	Spanish Springs	3–1	Green Valley	Galena High School
2011	Green Valley	3–0	Reed	Chaparral High School
2010	Douglas	3–0	Green Valley	Bishop Manogue High School

=== Winter ===
==== Basketball ====
Boys

Boys 5A State Championship Results
Year	Champion	Runner up	Score
2026	Coronado	Liberty	60-55
2025	Bishop Gorman	Mojave	71-59
2024	Bishop Gorman	Coronado	63-30
2023	Durango	Liberty	57-47
2022	Liberty	Bishop Gorman	63-62, OT
2021	N/A - No season due to COVID-19		
2020	Bishop Gorman	Desert Pines	65-37
2019	Bishop Gorman	Clark	68-60
2018	Bishop Gorman	Bishop Manogue	62-41
2017	Bishop Gorman	Clark	62-58
2016	Bishop Gorman	Coronado	83-63
2015	Bishop Gorman	Palo Verde	74-54
2014	Bishop Gorman	Canyon Springs	71-58
2013	Bishop Gorman	Centennial	69-43
2012	Bishop Gorman	Hug	96-51
2011	Canyon Springs	Bishop Manogue	82-47
2010	Bishop Gorman	Canyon Springs	69-48

Girls

Girls 5A State Championship Results
Year	Champion	Runner up	Score
2026	Bishop Gorman	Democracy Prep	79-76, OT
2025	Centennial	Democracy Prep	61-54
2024	Bishop Gorman	Centennial	57-53
2023	Centennial	Coronado	59-20
2022	Centennial	Bishop Manogue	93-34
2021	N/A - No season due to COVID-19		
2020	Centennial	Desert Oasis	79-51
2019	Centennial	Bishop Gorman	78-47
2018	Centennial	Liberty	74-65, OT
2017	Centennial	Bishop Manogue	97-52
2016	Centennial	Liberty	78-62
2015	Centennial	Bishop Gorman	65-52
2014	Reno	Liberty	50-39
2013	Reno	Bishop Gorman	52-39
2012	Reed	Reno	56-51
2011	Centennial	Liberty	71-65, OT
2010	Bishop Gorman	Reed	82-59

==== Bowling ====
Boys

Boys 5A State Championship Results
Year	Team Champion	Score	Runner-up	Individual Champion
2026	Coronado	7-2	Shadow Ridge	Cheuk Him Lee, Palo Verde
2025	Palo Verde	5-4	Liberty	Jerrad Barczyszyn, Shadow Ridge
2024	Palo Verde	9-0	Sierra Vista	Mason Snow, Silverado
2023	Centennial	7-2	Shadow Ridge	Seth Stovall, Shadow Ridge
2022	Clark	7-2	Shadow Ridge	Gianni Silva, Arbor View
2021	N/A - No season due to COVID-19			
2020	Arbor View	7-2	Liberty	Gianni Silva, Arbor View
2019	Spring Valley	7-2	Palo Verde	Andrew Guba, Spring Valley
2018	Spring Valley	7-2	Foothill	Kyle Wilson, Las Vegas
2017	Las Vegas	9-0	Arbor View	Caleb Andrews, Clark
2016	Desert Oasis	7-2	Liberty	Joe Gerencser, Green Valley
2015	Coronado	7-2	Arbor View	Cameron Collins, Arbor View
2014	Centennial	7-2	Las Vegas	Garrett Page, Centennial
2013	Centennial	9-0	Green Valley	Garrett Page, Centennial
2012	SECTA	7-2	Shadow Ridge	Dallas Leong, SECTA
2011	Centennial	5-4	SECTA	Dallas Leong, SECTA

Girls

Girls 5A State Championship Results
Year	Team Champion	Score	Runner-up	Individual Champion
2026	Shadow Ridge	9-0	Desert Oasis	Peyton Manning, Liberty
2025	Coronado	9-0	Clark	Calee Berry, Coronado
2024	Desert Oasis	7-2	Centennial	Lilly Houle, Centennial
2023	Centennial	7-2	Palo Verde	Ryann Clark, Palo Verde
2022	Arbor View	7-2	Desert Oasis	Kelsey Aczon, Desert Oasis
2021	N/A - No season due to COVID-19			
2020	Spring Valley	9-0	Arbor View	Jazelle Lampkin, Basic
2019	Shadow Ridge	9-0	Basic	Olivia Lampkin, Basic
2018	Basic	7-2	Spring Valley	Savannah Decker, Valley
2017	Liberty	7-2	Spring Valley	Leah Glazer, Bishop Gorman
2016	Centennial	5-4	Foothill	Natallie Kowalski, Palo Verde
2015	Silverado	9-0	Shadow Ridge	Natallie Kowalski, Palo Verde
2014	Silverado	9-0	Bonanza	Gabriella Weis, Las Vegas
2013	Silverado	9-0	Cimarron-Memorial	Michelle Matsumoto, Silverado
2012	Liberty	7-2	Arbor View	Maluhia Ulrich, Liberty
2011	Basic	5-4	Cimarron-Memorial	Jennifer Kraft, Cimarron-Memorial

==== Skiing ====
Boys

Boys State Championship Results
Year	Slalom		Giant Slalom		Combined	
Year	Team	Individual	Team	Individual	Team	Individual
2026	Galena/McQueen (tie)	Max Cooper, McQueen	McQueen	Mason Ayers, McQueen	McQueen	Mason Ayers, McQueen
2025	Manogue	Enzo Vannini, Manogue	McQueen	Max Cooper, McQueen	Manogue	Mason Ayers, McQueen
2024	Manogue	Kole Cronin, Manogue	Manogue	Sawyer Broman, Manogue	Manogue	Kole Cronin, Manogue
2023	Manogue	Ryan Wilson, Damonte	Slalom only; giant slalom canceled due to weather			
2022	Manogue	Charles Zaretsky, Galena	Manogue	Charles Zaretsky, Galena	Manogue	Charles Zaretsky, Galena
2021	N/A - No season due to COVID-19					
2020	North Tahoe	Trent Carter, North Tahoe	North Tahoe	Trent Carter, North Tahoe	North Tahoe	Trent Carter, North Tahoe
2019	North Tahoe	Gunnar Barnwell, Whittell	North Tahoe	Toby Gajar, North Tahoe	North Tahoe	Trent Carter, North Tahoe
2018	Galena	Will Casaceli, Reno	Galena	Nick Fischer, Manogue	Galena	Will Casaceli, Reno
2017	North Tahoe	Winston Pretti, Incline	North Tahoe	Winston Pretti, Incline	North Tahoe	Winston Pretti, Incline
2016	Galena	Connor Novak, NV	Galena	Matt Smallhouse, Galena	Galena	Matt Smallhouse, Galena

Girls State Championship Results
Year	Slalom		Giant Slalom		Combined	
Year	Team	Individual	Team	Individual	Team	Individual
2026	Galena	Meila Ayers, McQueen	Reno	Meila Ayers, McQueen	Galena	Meila Ayers, McQueen
2025	Reno	Meila Ayers, McQueen	Reno	Meila Ayers, McQueen	Reno	Meila Ayers, McQueen
2024	Manogue	Brighton Hamilton, McQueen	Reno	Brighton Hamilton, McQueen	Galena	Brighton Hamilton, McQueen
2023	Galena	Sophia Cerretti, Galena	Slalom only; giant slalom canceled due to weather			
2022	Galena	Maya Hsu, Manogue	Galena	Olivia Saenz, Galena	Galena	Maya Hsu, Manogue
2021	N/A - No season due to COVID-19					
2020	Truckee	Amber Hansford, Truckee	North Tahoe & Truckee (TIE)	Amber Hansford, Truckee	Truckee	Amber Hansford, Truckee
2019	North Tahoe	Maddie Roberts, North Tahoe	North Tahoe	Aliza Neu, North Tahoe	North Tahoe	Aliza Neu, North Tahoe
2018	Galena	Gigi Taylor, Manogue	Galena	Gigi Taylor, Manogue	Galena	Gigi Taylor, Manogue
2017	South Tahoe	Jillian Ferre, North Tahoe	North Tahoe	Madeline Roberts, North Tahoe	North Tahoe	Jillian Ferre, North Tahoe
2016	Manogue	Sophia MacLean, Manogue	Galena	Cyd Curle, Galena	Manogue	Cyd Curle, Galena

==== Wrestling ====
5A State Championship Results
Year	Team Champion	Venue
2026	SLAM Nevada	Winnemucca Events Center
2025	SLAM Nevada	Rafter 3C Arena
2024	SLAM Nevada	Anderson Auto Group Fieldhouse
2023	SLAM Nevada	Winnemucca Events Center
2022	SLAM Nevada	Cimarron-Memorial High School
2021	N/A - No season due to COVID-19	
2020	Green Valley	Cimarron-Memorial High School
2019		Winnemucca Events Center
2018	Spanish Springs	Orleans Arena
2017	Green Valley	Spanish Springs High School
2016	Green Valley	Primm
2015	Green Valley	Winnemucca Events Center
2014	Green Valley	Primm
2013	Green Valley	Reno Livestock Events Center
2012	Green Valley	UNLV Cox Pavilion
2011	Las Vegas	Spanish Springs High School

=== Spring ===
==== Baseball ====
5A State Championship Results
Year	Champions	Score	Runner-up	Venue
2026	Bishop Gorman	5-3	Bishop Manogue	Las Vegas High School
2025	Basic	3-2	Reno	William Peccole Park
2024	Palo Verde	7-0	Reno	Bishop Gorman High School
2023	Bishop Gorman	10-1	Desert Oasis	William Peccole Park
2022	Basic	16-7	Bishop Gorman	Las Vegas Ballpark
2021	N/A - No state tournament held			
2020	N/A - No state tournament held			
2019	Desert Oasis	9-1	Reno	Las Vegas Ballpark
2018	Palo Verde	4-2	Basic	Bishop Manogue High School
2017	Basic	16-6	Galena	Las Vegas High School
2016	Basic	9-1	Centennial	Bishop Manogue High School
2015	Bishop Gorman	6-5	Green Valley	Durango High School
2014	Liberty	5-3	Centennial	William Peccole Park
2013	Coronado	7-4	Bishop Gorman	College of Southern Nevada
2012	Bishop Gorman	11-1	Coronado	William Peccole Park
2011	Bishop Gorman	10-0	Green Valley	College of Southern Nevada

==== Golf (Boys) ====
5A State Championship Results
Year	Team Champion	Individual Champion	Venue
2026	Bishop Gorman	Colby Hutton, Bishop Gorman	Boulder Creek Golf Club
2025	Coronado	Andrew Stout, Shadow Ridge	Red Hawk Golf and Resort, Sparks
2024	Coronado	Anderson Lee, Coronado	Mountain Falls Golf Club, Pahrump
2023	Bishop Gorman	Bridger Johnson, Shadow Ridge	Red Hawk Golf and Resort, Sparks
2022	Coronado	Mason Snyder, Palo Verde	Coyote Springs, Moapa
2021	N/A - No state tournament held		
2020	N/A - No state tournament held		
2019	Coronado	Michael Sarro, Coronado	Somersett, Reno
2018	Coronado	Cameron Gambini, Arbor View	Reflection Bay Golf Club, Henderson
2017	Palo Verde	Ollie Osborne, Bishop Manogue	Toiyabe, Washoe Valley
2016	Palo Verde	Jack Trent, Palo Verde	Reflection Bay Golf Club, Henderson
2015	Bishop Manogue	Jack Trent, Palo Verde	Montreux Golf & Country Club, Reno
2014	Bishop Gorman	Van Thomas, Arbor View	Mountain Falls Golf Club, Pahrump
2013	Bishop Manogue	Taylor Montgomery, Foothill	Sierra Sage, Reno
2012	Coronado	AJ McInerney, Coronado	TPC, Las Vegas
2011	Coronado	Taylor Montgomery, Foothill	Hidden Valley Country Club, Reno
2010	Coronado	AJ McInerney, Coronado	TPC, Las Vegas

==== Softball ====
5A State Championship Results
Year	Champions	Score	Runner-up	Venue
2026	Palo Verde	4-0	Bishop Manogue	Faith Lutheran High School
2025	Palo Verde	7-3	Centennial	Hixson Park, UNR
2024	Coronado	4-2	Douglas	Bishop Gorman High School
2023	Douglas	6-3	Centennial	Hixson Park, UNR
2022	Green Valley	8-2	Douglas	College of Southern Nevada
2021	N/A - No state tournament held			
2020	N/A - No state tournament held			
2019	Shadow Ridge	13-3	Coronado	Bishop Gorman High School
2018	Spanish Springs	6-2	Douglas	Bishop Manogue High School
2017	Palo Verde	9-3	Reed	Bishop Gorman High School
2016	Spanish Springs	2-1	Rancho	Hixson Park, UNR
2015	Reed	3-2	Palo Verde	Eller Media Field, UNLV
2014	Palo Verde	12-8	Reed	Hixson Park, UNR
2013	Centennial	13-0	Palo Verde	Eller Media Field, UNLV
2012	Centennial	11-0	Coronado	Hixson Park, UNR
2011	Palo Verde	7-1	Centennial	Eller Media Field, UNLV

==== Swimming and Diving ====
5A State Championship Results
Year	Girls Team Champion	Boys Team Champion
2026	Coronado	Palo Verde
2025	Coronado	Palo Verde
2024	Coronado	Palo Verde
2023	Coronado	Palo Verde
2022	Coronado	Palo Verde
2021	N/A - No state tournament held	
2020	N/A - No state tournament held	
2019	Palo Verde	Palo Verde
2018	Green Valley	Palo Verde
2017	Palo Verde	Palo Verde
2016	Palo Verde	Palo Verde
2015	Palo Verde	Palo Verde
2014	Bishop Gorman	Palo Verde
2013	Bishop Gorman	Palo Verde
2012	Bishop Gorman	Boulder City
2011	Bishop Gorman	Boulder City
2010	Bishop Gorman	Palo Verde

==== Track and Field ====
5A State Championship Results
Year	Girls Team Champion	Boys Team Champion
2026	Centennial	Centennial
2025	Centennial	Shadow Ridge
2024	Centennial	Shadow Ridge
2023	Liberty	Liberty
2022	Centennial	McQueen
2021	N/A - No state tournament held	
2020	N/A - No state tournament held	
2019	Centennial	Bishop Gorman
2018	Centennial	Bishop Gorman
2017	Centennial	Centennial
2016	Centennial	Silverado
2015	Centennial	Centennial
2014	Centennial	McQueen
2013	Centennial	Centennial
2012	Centennial	Centennial
2011	Centennial	Silverado
2010	McQueen	McQueen
2009	Western	Valley
2008	Reno	Damonte Ranch
2007	Reno	Reno
2006	Galena	Galena
2005	Cheyenne	Silverado
2004	Reno	Cimarron-Memorial
2003	Reno	Green Valley
2002	Centennial	Galena
2001	Cheyenne	Hug
2000	Mojave	Mojave

==== Volleyball (Boys) ====
5A State Championship Results
Year	Champions	Score	Runner-up	Venue
2026	Arbor View	3–1	Centennial	Sunrise Mountain
2025	Coronado	3–2	Palo Verde	Sunrise Mountain
2024	Palo Verde	3–0	Coronado	Sunrise Mountain
2023	Shadow Ridge	3–2	Palo Verde	Shadow Ridge
2022	Shadow Ridge	3–1	Green Valley	Shadow Ridge
2021	Coronado	3–2	Centennial	Centennial
2020	N/A - No state tournament held			
2019	Palo Verde	3–0	Coronado	Mojave
2018	Centennial	3–0	Foothill	Arbor View
2017	Palo Verde	3–1	Las Vegas	Chaparral
2016	Green Valley	3–1	Foothill	Legacy
2015	Palo Verde	3–0	Legacy	Las Vegas
2014	Legacy	3–0	Las Vegas	Legacy
2013	Coronado	3–1	Foothill	Chaparral
2012	Coronado	3–2	Silverado	Chaparral

== NIAA Award of Excellence ==
The NIAA Award of Excellence, which began in 2001, is an award program that awards NIAA-affiliated schools points based on their varsity teams' performances in academics, athletics, and through the Citizens Through Sports program. Each of the three major categories in high school activities – academics, athletics and sportsmanship – are weighted equally, and boys and girls programs are combined in the standings table. Spirit points are added after the conclusion of the winter season and points are deducted for ejections and other unsportsmanlike conduct. The NIAA honors the winning school in each classification by presenting it with a championship banner and commemorative trophy. The NIAA considers the Award of Excellence in Academics, Athletics and Citizenship to be its top overall program.

The past champions include:

Year	AAAAA	AAAA	AAA	AA	A
2024-25	Bishop Manogue		Boulder City	Lincoln County	Pahranagat Valley
2023-24	Coronado	Southeast Career Technical Academy	Virgin Valley	North Tahoe	Wells
2022-23	Faith Lutheran	Southeast Career Technical Academy	Moapa Valley	The Meadows	Pahranagat Valley
2021-22	Bishop Manogue	Basic	Boulder City	The Meadows	Eureka
2019-20		Bishop Manogue	Boulder City	The Meadows	Pahranagat Valley
2018-19		Bishop Gorman	Boulder City	The Meadows	Pahranagat Valley
2017-18		Bishop Manogue	Boulder City	The Meadows	Pahranagat Valley
2016-17		Reno / Palo Verde (tie)	Boulder City	The Meadows	Sierra Lutheran
2015-16		Bishop Manogue	Faith Lutheran	The Meadows	Pahranagat Valley
2014-15		Bishop Manogue	Faith Lutheran	The Meadows	Whittell
2013-14		Bishop Gorman	Faith Lutheran	The Meadows	Whittell
2012-13		Bishop Manogue	Boulder City	Incline	Pahranagat Valley
2011-12		Bishop Manogue	Boulder City	The Meadows	Pahranagat Valley
2010-11		Reno	Boulder City	Incline	Pahranagat Valley
2009-10		Bishop Manogue	Boulder City	Whittell	Pahranagat Valley
2008-09		Palo Verde	Faith Lutheran	The Meadows	Pahranagat Valley
2007-08		Palo Verde	Truckee	The Meadows	Pahranagat Valley
2006-07		Palo Verde	Boulder City	Rite of Passage	Pahranagat Valley
2005-06		Galena	Boulder City	The Meadows	Pahranagat Valley
2004-05		Palo Verde	Boulder City	Whittell	Wells
2003-04		Palo Verde	Virgin Valley	Faith Lutheran	Smith Valley
2002-03		Palo Verde	Truckee	Faith Lutheran	Smith Valley
2001-02		Carson	Spring Creek	Faith Lutheran	Pahranagat Valley
2000-01		Reno	Moapa Valley	The Meadows	Pahranagat Valley

== See also ==
- Sunrise 4A Region
- Sunset 4A Region
- Southern Nevada 2A Region
- Northern Nevada 4A Region
- Northern Nevada 3A Region
