= List of high schools in Nevada =

This is a list of high schools in the state of Nevada.

== Carson City ==
- Carson High School, Carson City
- Sierra Lutheran High School, Carson City
- Silver State High School, Carson City
- Pioneer High School, Carson City

== Churchill County ==
- Churchill County High School, Fallon
- Oasis Academy Charter School, Fallon

== Clark County ==
- Boulder City High School, Boulder City
- Desert Oasis High School, Enterprise
- Indian Springs High School, Indian Springs
- Laughlin Junior and Senior High School, Laughlin
- Moapa Valley High School, Overton
- Valley High School, Winchester
- Virgin Valley High School, Mesquite
- Sandy Valley School, Sandy Valley

=== Henderson ===
- Basic Academy of International Studies
- College of Southern Nevada High School South
- Coronado High School
- Foothill High School
- Green Valley High School
- Henderson International School
- Liberty High School
- Southeast Career Technical Academy

=== Las Vegas ===
==== Public Schools ====
- Advanced Technologies Academy
- Arbor View High School
- Bonanza High School
- Centennial High School
- Cimarron-Memorial High School
- Clark High School
- College of Southern Nevada High School West
- Desert Pines High School
- Las Vegas Academy
- Mission High School
- Miley Achievement Center
- Morris Sunset East High School
- Nevada State High School (Henderson, Downtown, Southwest, Summerlin, Sunrise)
- Odyssey Charter School
- Northwest Career and Technical Academy
- Palo Verde High School
- Shadow Ridge High School
- Southwest Career and Technical Academy
- Veterans Tribute Career & Technical Academy
- West Career and Technical Academy
- West Preparatory Academy
- Western High School

==== Private Schools ====
- Bishop Gorman High School
- Faith Lutheran Middle School & High School
- The Meadows School

=== North Las Vegas ===
- Canyon Springs High School
- Cheyenne High School
- College of Southern Nevada High School East
- Legacy High School
- Mojave High School
- Rancho High School

Paradise

- Chaparral High School
- Del Sol Academy of the Performing Arts
- Silverado High School

=== Spring Valley ===
- Durango High School
- Sierra Vista High School
- Spring Valley High School

=== Sunrise Manor ===
- East Career & Technical Academy
- Eldorado High School
- Las Vegas High School
- Sunrise Mountain High School

== Douglas County ==
- Douglas High School, Minden
- Jacobsen High School, China Springs
- Sierra Crest Academy, Minden
- Whitell High School, Zephyr Cove

== Elko County ==
- Carlin High School, Carlin
- Elko High School, Elko
- Independence High School, Elko
- Jackpot High School, Jackpot
- Owyhee High School, Owyhee
- Spring Creek High School, Elko
- Wells High School, Wells
- West Wendover High School, West Wendover

== Esmeralda County ==
- Esmeralda Virtual High School

Esmeralda County has no physical high schools. High school students living in Esmeralda County attend Tonopah High School in Nye County.

== Eureka County ==
- Eureka County High School, Eureka

High School students living in Crescent Valley and Beowawe who attend high school physically attend Battle Mountain High School in Lander County. High School students living in Pine Valley who attend high school physically attend Carlin High School in Elko County.

== Humboldt County ==
- Albert M. Lowry High School, Winnemucca
- McDermitt High School, McDermitt

As of 2004 Denio, Nevada parents with high school aged children may either send their children to Crane Union High School, a public boarding school in Oregon, or for the time being move to Winnemucca, Nevada so their children can attend Lowry.

== Lander County ==
- Austin High School, Austin
- Battle Mountain High School, Battle Mountain

== Lincoln County ==
- C. O. Bastian High School, Caliente
- Lincoln County High School, Panaca
- Pahranagat Valley High School, Alamo

== Lyon County ==
- Dayton High School, Dayton
- Fernley High School, Fernley
- Silver Stage High School, Silver Springs
- Smith Valley High School, Smith
- Yerington High School, Yerington

== Mineral County ==
- Mineral County High School, Hawthorne

== Nye County ==
- Beatty High School, Beatty
- Gabbs High School, Gabbs
- Pahrump Valley High School, Pahrump
- Round Mountain Jr/Sr High School, Round Mountain
- Tonopah High School, Tonopah

== Pershing County ==
- Pershing County High School, Lovelock

== Storey County ==
- Virginia City High School, Virginia City

== Washoe County ==
- Gerlach High School, Gerlach
- Incline High School, Incline Village
- Pyramid Lake Schools, Nixon

=== Reno ===
==== Public Schools ====
- Academy of Arts, Careers and Technology
- Coral Academy of Science
- Damonte Ranch High School
- Debbie Smith TCE Academy
- Galena High School
- Hug High School
- Innovations High School
- North Valleys High School
- McQueen High School
- Reno High School
- TMCC Magnet High School
- Wooster High School

==== Private Schools ====
- Bishop Manogue High School
- Nevada State High School
- Sage Ridge School

=== Sparks ===
- Excel Christian School
- Reed High School
- Spanish Springs High School
- Sparks High School

== White Pine County ==
- Lund High School, Lund
- Steptoe Valley High School, Ely
- White Pine High School, Ely
