= List of Clark County School District schools =

This is a list of schools in the Clark County School District located in Clark County, Nevada. This list does not include schools which are under the Nevada State Public Charter School Authority, a separate school district which authorizes public-private charter schools in Nevada.

== Elementary schools (K–5th grade) ==
Name	Region	Months	Comments
Sandra B. Abston Elementary School	Region 2		Opened in 2019.
Kirk L. Adams Elementary School	Region 3		Opened in 1992.
O. K. Adcock Elementary School	Region 2, Southwest	9 month	Opened in 1965, Rebuilt in 2003. Full day kindergarten.
Tony Alamo Elementary School	Region 2, Southwest	9 month	Opened in 2002. Half day kindergarten
Dean Lamar Allen Elementary School	Region 1, Northwest	9 month	Opened in 1997. Full day kindergarten.
Lee Antonello Elementary School	Region 1, Superintendent School - North East	9 month	Opened in 1992. Full Day Kindergarten.
Sister Robert Joseph Bailey Elementary School	Region 3, Southeast	9 month	Opened in 2007.
Shirley A. Barber Elementary School	Region 3		Opened in 2018.
Selma F. Bartlett Elementary School	Region 3, Southeast	9 month	Opened in 1992. Named after Selma F. Bartlett.
John C. Bass Elementary School	Region 3, Southeast	9 Month	Full day kindergarten. Opened in 2001.
Kathy L. Batterman Elementary School	Region 2, Southwest	9 Month	Named in honor of Flight for Life flight nurse Kathy Batterman. Opened in 2005.
John R. Beatty Elementary School	Region 3, Southeast	9 month	Opened in 1989.
Will Beckley Elementary School	Region 2, East	9 Month	Opened in 1967. Full day kindergarten
Rex Bell Elementary School	Region 2, Southwest	9 Month	Originally Built in 1964, Rebuilt in 2017. Full day kindergarten
Patricia A. Bendorf Elementary School	Region 2, Southwest	9 Month	Opened in 1992. Full day kindergarten
William G. Bennett Elementary School	Region 3, Southeast	9 month	Opened in 1986. Located in Laughlin.
Shelley Berkley Elementary School	Region 2, Southwest	9 Month	Opened in 2017.
James H. Bilbray Elementary School	Region 1, Northwest	9 month	Opened in 2003. Year Round Kindergarten.
Blue Diamond Elementary School	Region 2, Southwest	9 month	Opened in 1929. Located in Blue Diamond, Nevada
John W. Bonner Elementary School	Region 2, Northwest	9 month	Opened in 1997. Full day kindergarten
Kermit R. Booker Sr. Interactive Elementary School	Region 1, Superintendent School - Northwest	9 month	Opened in 1962. Full day kindergarten. Empowerment school. Original facility was razed in 2005; rebuilt campus opened August 2007. Formerly Highland Elementary School.
Bowler, Grant Elementary School	Region 1, Northeast	9 month	Opened In 1981. Located in Logandale, Nevada
Bowler, Joseph L. Elementary School	Region 1, Northeast	9 month	Opened in 2001. Located in Bunkerville, Nevada. Full day kindergarten.
Henry and Evelyn Bozarth Elementary School	Region 1, Northwest	9 month	Opened August 2009, Empowerment school, offers full day kindergarten.
Walter Bracken STEAM Academy	Region 3, Superintendent School - East	9 month	Opened in 1962. Full day Kindergarten. Choice school. Magnet school for math and science through technology established in 2001.
Eileen B. Brookman Elementary School	Region 3, East	9 Month	Opened in 2001.
Hannah Marie Brown Elementary School	Region 3	9 Month	Opened in 2021.
Lucille S. Bruner Elementary School	Region 1, Northwest	9 Month	Opened in 1994.
Bryan, Richard Elementary School	Region 1, Northwest	9 month	Opened in 1997. Full day kindergarten.
Bryan, Roger Elementary School	Region 2, Southwest	9 Month	Opened in 1997.
Berkley L. Bunker Elementary School	Region 1, Northwest	9 month	Opened in 1999. Full day kindergarten.
Marion E. Cahlan Elementary School	Region 1, Northeast	9 Month	Opened in 1965.
Arturo Cambeiro Elementary School	Region 3, Superintendent School - East	9 month	Opened in 1997. Full day kindergarten. Professional Practice School.
Kay Carl Elementary School	Region 1, Northwest	9 month	Opened in 2001. Full day kindergarten.
Roberta C. Cartwright Elementary School	Region 3, Southeast	9 Month	Opened in 1998.
M. J. Christensen Elementary School	Region 2, Southwest	9 month	Opened in 1989. Mascot is the Mariners.
Eileen Conners Elementary School	Region 1, Northwest	9 month	Opened in 2004. Full day kindergarten.
Manuel J. Cortez Elementary School	Region 3, Northeast	9 Month	Opened in 1999. Full day kindergarten.
Cox, Clyde Elementary School	Region 1, Northeast	9 Month	Opened in 1987. Full day kindergarten.
Cox, David Elementary School	Region 3, Southeast	9 month	Opened in 1991.
Steve and Linda Cozine Elementary School	Region 1, Northeast	9 Month	Opened in 2002. Full day kindergarten.
Lois Craig Elementary School	Region 1, Northeast	9 Month	Opened in 1964. Full day kindergarten.
Crestwood Elementary School	Region 2, East	9 month	Opened in 1953. Full day kindergarten.
Paul E. Culley Elementary School	Region 1, Superintendent School - Northwest	9 Month	Opened in 1964. Full day kindergarten. Empowerment School.
Cynthia Cunningham Elementary School	Region 3, Southeast	9 Month	Opened in 1990. Full day kindergarten.
Jack Dailey Elementary School	Region 2, East		Opened in 1992.
Marshall Darnell Elementary School	Region 1, Northwest		Opened in 2001.
Laura Dearing Elementary School	Region 2, East	12 Month	Opened in 1964, Full day kindergarten.
C. H. Decker Elementary School	Region 2		Opened in 1977.
Herbert A. Derfelt Elementary School	Region 2, Southwest		Opened in 1991.
Ruthe Deskin Elementary School	Region 1, Northwest		Opened in 1988.
Ollie Detwiler Elementary School	Region 1		Opened in 2000.
Ruben P. Diaz Elementary School	Region 3		Opened in 2008.
Dusty "D.L." Dickens Elementary School	Region 1, Northeast	9 month	Opened in 2007.
P.A. Diskin Elementary School	Region 2, Southwest	9 Month	Opened in 1974.
Kenneth Divich Elementary School	Region 1		Opened in 2018. The school was named for long time Las Vegas educator and civic leader Kenneth Divich.
Harvey N. Dondero Elementary School	Region 2, Southwest		Opened in December 1976
John A. Dooley Elementary School	Region 3, Southeast	9 month	Opened in 1988, and served as the campus for Sue Morrow Elementary in 1997 when that school was finishing up being built
Ruby Duncan Elementary School	Region 1	9 month	Opened August 30, 2010
Earl, Ira J. Elementary School	Region 3, East	9 Month	Opened in 1966. Replacement Project is scheduled to complete by 2022. Mascot is the Cougars
Earl, Marion B. Elementary School	Region 2		Opened in 1987.
Elbert Edwards Elementary School	Region 3, East		Opened in 1976. Replacement Project is scheduled to complete by 2020.
Dorothy Eisenberg Elementary School	Region 1, Northwest		Opened in 1991.
Raul P. Elizondo Elementary School	Region 1, Northeast	9 Month	Mascot is the Bulldogs Opened in 1996.
Robert and Sandy Ellis Elementary School	Region 3		Opened in 2018.
William E. Ferron Elementary School	Region 2, East	9 Month	Opened in 1971. Replacement Project is scheduled to complete by 2021.
Mark L. Fine Elementary School	Region 2		Opened in 2009.
H.P. Fitzgerald Elementary School	Region 1, Northeast		Opened in 1994.
Wing & Lilly Fong Elementary School	Region 1, Northwest	9 Month	Opened in 1991.
Robert L. Forbuss Elementary School	Region 2, Southwest	9 Month	Opened in 2007.
Doris French Elementary School	Region 2, Southeast		Opened in 1978.
Charles & Phyllis Frias Elementary School	Region 2, Southwest		Opened in 2003.
Fay Galloway Elementary School	Region 3, Southeast		Opened in 1979.
Edith Garehime Elementary School	Region 1, Northwest		Opened in 1998.
Roger D. Gehring Academy of Science and Technology	Region 3, Southeast		Opened in 2002. Magnet academy established in 2018.
James Gibson Elementary School	Region 3, Southeast		Opened in 1993.
C.V.T. Gilbert Magnet School of Communication and Creative Arts	Region 1, Superintendent School - Northwest		Opened in 1966. Magnet program established in 1994. Curriculum revolves around the fine arts and performance.
Linda Rankin Givens Elementary School	Region 2, Northwest	9 month	Opened in 2004 in the Vistas in Summerlin. The third two-story elementary built in Las Vegas.
Daniel Goldfarb Elementary School	Region 3, East		Opened in 1997.
Goodsprings Elementary School	Region 2		Occupies the Goodsprings Schoolhouse which opened in 1913. It was the oldest and smallest school in Nevada; as of 2008, there were only six enrolled students. Shared a principal with Sandy Valley Elementary Schools and Indian Springs Elementary School. Closed in 2026 due to low enrollment.
Judy & John L. Goolsby Elementary School	Region 2, Southwest	9 month	Opened in 2004.
Theron and Naomi Goynes Elementary School	Region 1		Opened in 2005.
Oran K. Gragson Elementary School	Region 3, East		Opened in 1979.
R. Guild Gray Elementary School	Region 2	9 month	Opened in 1980.
E.W. Griffith Elementary School	Region 2, Southwest	9 month	Opened in 1962. New facility to open in 2019.
Addeliar D. Guy Elementary School	Region 1		Opened in 1998.
Doris Hancock Elementary School	Region 2		Opened in 1966.
Harley A. Harmon Elementary School	Region 3		Opened in 1973. Replacement Project scheduled to be complete by 2022.
George E. Harris Elementary School	Region 2, East		Opened in 1974. New facility scheduled to open in 2021.
Don E. Hayden Elementary School	Region 1	9 month	Opened in August 2006. Full day Kindergarten. Home of The Hayden Heros.
Keith C. And Karen W. Hayes Elementary School	Region 2		Opened in 1999.
Lomie G. Heard Elementary School	Region 3		Original campus was located within Nellis Air Force Base from 1951 to 2015. A new school facility opened Fall 2017. Magnet program established in 2017, as well.
Howard Heckethorn Elementary School	Region 1		Opened in 2001.
Helen Herr Elementary School	Region 3		Opened in 1991.
Fay Herron Elementary School	Region 3		Opened in 1964.
Halle Hewetson Elementary School	Region 3, East		Opened in 1957.
Liliam Lujan Hickey Elementary School	Region 3		Opened in 2005.
Charlotte Hill Elementary School	Region 3		Opened in 1990. Sister school to Louis Wiener ES.
Edna F. Hinman Elementary School	Region 3	9 month	Opened in 1986.
Mabel Hoggard Math and Science Magnet School	Region 1	9 month	Opened in 1952. Magnet program established in 1993.
Howard Hollingsworth Elementary School	Region 2, East		Opened in 2003. The second two-story elementary school building in Las Vegas.
John R. Hummel Elementary School	Region 3		Opened in 2005.
Indian Springs Elementary School	Region 1, Northwest	9 Month	Located in Indian Springs
Mervin Iverson Elementary School	Region 3, East		Opened in 2001.
Walter Jacobson Elementary School	Region 2		Opened in 1991.
Jay W. Jeffers Elementary School	Region 3		Opened in 2005.
Earl N. Jenkins Elementary School	Region 3		Opened in 2019.
Jan Jones Blackhurst Elementary School	Region 2, Southwest		Opened in 2017.
Helen M. Jydstrup Elementary School	Region 2, Southwest	9 Month	Built in 1991.
Marc A. Kahre Elementary School	Region 1		Opened in 1991. Named after a Las Vegas Metropolitan Police officer who was killed in the line of duty.
Edythe and Lloyd Katz Elementary School	Region 1		Opened in 1991.
Charlotte and Jerry Keller Elementary School	Region 3		Opened in 2009.
Matt Kelly Elementary School	Region 3		Opened in 1960.
Lorna Kesterson Elementary School	Region 3		Opened in 1999. Named for Lorna Kesterson, the first female Mayor of Henderson (1985-1993)
Frank Kim Elementary School	Region 2, Southwest	9 month	Opened in 1989.
King, Jr., Martin Luther Elementary School	Region 3		Opened in 1988.
King, Martha P. Elementary School	Region 3		Opened in 1991.
Robert E. Lake Elementary School	Region 2, East		Opened in 1962.
Frank Lamping Elementary School	Region 3		Opened in 1998. School has an observatory. McCool science center in honor or the astronaut Willie McCool who died in the Columbia accident opened in October, 2005. His parents live in Vegas and were involved in the effort to get this center built in his honor.
Joseph M. Lincoln Elementary School	Region 1		Originally built in 1955. Rebuilt in 2017.
Walter V. Long STEAM Academy	Region 2, East		Opened in 1978.
Mary & Zel Lowman Elementary School	Region 1		Opened in 1993.
William R. Lummis Elementary School	Region 1, Northwest	9 month	Opened in 1993.
Earl B. Lundy Elementary School	Region 1		One of the smallest schools in the district with typical attendance of less than 15 students. Located on Mount Charleston.
Robert Lunt Elementary School	Region 3, East		Opened in 1990.
Ann Lynch Elementary School	Region 3		Opened in 1990.
Nate Mack Elementary School	Region 3, Southeast		Opened in 1983.
Jo Mackey Academy of Leadership and Global Communications	Region 1, Central north	9 month	Opened in 1965. New facility will be completed in 2020. Magnet program established in 2004; choir, robotics teams, drill team; project-based learning. K-8 school.
J. E. Manch Elementary School	Region 1		Opened in 1964. Rebuilt in 2010.
Reynaldo Martinez Elementary School	Region 1		Opened in 2000.
Dr. Beverly S. Mathis Elementary School	Region 1		Opened in 2017.
Ernest J. May Elementary School	Region 1		Opened in 1991.
Quannah McCall Elementary School	Region 1		Opened in 1964.
Gordon M. McCaw STEAM Academy	Region 3, Southeast	9 month	Opened in 1954 old campus demolished and rebuilt in 2008. Magnet program established in 2014. Originally known as Basic Elementary School.
Estes McDoniel Elementary School	Region 3		Opened in 1987.
James B. McMillan Elementary School	Region 1		Opened in 1990.
J. T. McWilliams Elementary School	Region 1		Opened in 1963.
John F. Mendoza Elementary School	Region 3, East		Opened in 1990.
Sandy Searles Miller Academy for International Studies	Region 3	9 month	Opened in 2003. Magnet.
Andrew Mitchell Elementary School	Region 3		Opened in 1974.
William Moore Elementary School	Region 3, East		Opened in 2001.
Sue H. Morrow Elementary School	Region 3, Southeast	9-Month	Finished in 1998. The school originated in John Dooley Elementary from August 25, 1997 – January 4, 1998. It was a 12-month school from 1999 to 2010. Nation Blue Ribbon School 2015.
Mountain View Elementary School	Region 3		Opened in 1955.
Joseph M. Neal STEAM Academy	Region 1		Opened in 1999.
Ulis Newton Elementary School	Region 3		Opened in 1994.
Thomas O'Roarke Elementary School	Region 1		Opened in 2007.
D'Vorre and Hal Ober Elementary School	Region 2	9 month	Opened in 2000.
Dennis Ortwein Elementary School	Region 2		Opened in 2018.
Paradise Elementary School	Region 2, East		Opened in 1998.
John S. Park Elementary School	Region 2, East		Opened in 1944. New Facilities were Built in 1997-2001
Claude & Stella Parson Elementary School	Region 1		Opened in 1990.
Perkins, Dr. Claude G. Elementary School	Region 1, Northeast	9 month	Opened in 2007. Named after Claude G. Perkins, former CCSD Superintendent.
Perkins, Ute V. Elementary School	Region 1, Northeast	9 month	Located in Moapa, Nevada
Dean Petersen RISE Academy	Region 2, East		Opened in 2003.
Clarence Piggott Academy of International Studies	Region 2		Opened in 1994. Magnet program established in 2014.
Vail Pittman Elementary School	Region 2		Opened in 1964.
Richard Priest Elementary School	Region 1		Opened in 2003.
Aggie Roberts Elementary School	Region 3		Opened in 1997.
Red Rock Elementary School	Region 2		Opened in 1960.
Doris Reed Elementary School	Region 1		Opened in 1988.
Carolyn S. Reedom Elementary School	Region 2		Opened August 2008.
Harry Reid Elementary School	Region 3		One of the smallest schools in the district. Located in Searchlight.
Aldeane Comito Ries Elementary School	Region 2		Opened in 2005.
Betsy A. Rhodes Elementary School	Region 1		Opened in 1998.
Lucille S. Rogers Elementary School	Region 2, Southwest		Opened in 2001.
C. C. Ronnow Elementary School	Region 3, East		Opened in 1967.
Bertha Ronzone Elementary School	Region 1		Opened in 1966.
Dr. C. Owen Roundy Elementary School	Region 2, Southwest	9 Month	Opened in 2007.
Lewis E. Rowe Elementary School	Region 2, East	9 Month +17 extra days for ZOOM Summer Academy	Opened in 1965.
Richard J. Rundle Elementary School	Region 3, East		Opened in 1992.
Sandy Valley School	Region 2, Southwest	9 month	Opened in 1982. K-12 school. Located in Sandy Valley
William & Mary Scherkenbach Elementary School	Region 1		Opened in 2004.
Steven G. Schorr Elementary School	Region 3, Southeast	9 Month	Opened in August 2006. Named after, COX News Anchor Steven G. Schorr.
Jesse D. Scott Elementary School	Region 1		Opened in 2008. Home of the Rams.
C.T. Sewell Elementary School	Region 3		Opened in 1955.
Eva G. Simmons Elementary School	Region 1		Opened in 2004.
James E. & Alice Rae Smalley Elementary School	Region 3, Southeast	9 Month	Opened in 2007.
Smith, Hal Elementary School	Region 3, East		Opened in 2001.
Smith, Helen Elementary School	Region 3		Opened in 1975.
Snyder, Don and Dee Elementary School	Region 2		Opened in December 2017.
Snyder, William E. Elementary School	Region 2, East	9 Month	Opened in 2001. The school is named after William (Bill) E. Snyder, the President of the firm Tate Snyder Kimsey Architects.
C. P. Squires Elementary School	Region 3		Opened in 1962.
Stanford Elementary School	Region 3, East		Opened in 1988.
Ethel Winterheimer Staton Elementary School	Region 2		Opened in 2001.
Judith D. Steele Elementary School	Region 2		Opened in August 2006. National Blue Ribbon School (2020).
Josh Stevens Elementary School	Region 3		Opened in 2017.
Evelyn Stuckey Elementary School	Region 2, Southwest	9 Month	Opened in 2010.
Sunrise Acres Elementary School	Region 3, East		Opened in 1951. Rebuilt 2001.
Wayne N. Tanaka Elementary School	Region 2		Opened in 2004.
Sheila R. Tarr Academy of International Studies	Region 1	9 month	Opened 2001. Magnet program established in 2015.
John Tartan Elementary School	Region 1		Opened in 2005
Myrtle Tate Elementary School	Region 3, Northeast	9 Month	Opened in 1971. New facility expect to complete by 2021.
Taylor, Glen C. Elementary School	Region 3		Opened in 2003.
Taylor, Robert L. Elementary School	Region 3, Southeast		Opened in 1955. Rebuilt in 2008. Originally Park Village Elementary, renamed for Robert L. Taylor, principal of Basic Academy (High School) from 1957–1973. Rebuilt in 2008.
Joseph E. Thiriot Elementary School	Region 2, Southwest		Opened in 2005. A two-story facility.
Ruby S. Thomas Elementary School	Region 2, East		Opened in 1964. New facility to be built by 2022
Sandra L. Thompson Elementary School	Region 1		Opened in August 2006.
Jim Thorpe Elementary School	Region 3, Southeast		Opened in 1992. Located next to Treem Elementary School.
R.E. Tobler Elementary School	Region 1, Northwest	9 month	Opened in 1982.
Helen Toland International Academy	Region 1, Superintendent School - Northeast	9 month	Opened in 1956 as Kit Carson Elementary School. Full day kindergarten. Professional practice school. Magnet program established in 2011. Current name adopted in 2021.
Bill Y. Tomiyasu Elementary School	Region 2		Opened in 1975.
Harriet Treem Elementary School	Region 3, Southeast		Opened in 1990. Located next to Thorpe Elementary School.
Vincent L. Triggs Elementary School	Region 1		Opened August 30, 2010
Twin Lakes Elementary School	Region 1		Opened in 1966. New facility opened in 2019.
Neil C. Twitchell Elementary School	Region 3	9 month	Opened in 2001.
J.M. Ullom Elementary School	Region 2, East		Opened in 1963. Rebuilt in 2019.
John C. Vanderburg Elementary School	Region 3		Opened in 1997. Has a biosphere that houses a tropical rain forest.
Billy and Rosemary Vassiliadis Elementary School	Region 2		Opened in 2017.
Vegas Verdes Elementary School	Region 2		Opened in 1961.
Virgin Valley Elementary School	Region 1, Northeast	9 month	Opened in 2003. Located in Mesquite
J. Marlan Walker International Elementary School	Region 3		Opened in 2003.
Ward, Gene Elementary School	Region 2, East		Opened in August 1972. Rebuilding new facility in 2022.
Ward, Kitty McDonough Elementary School	Region 1, West	9 month	Opened in 2006.
Shirley and Bill Wallin Elementary School	Region 3		Opened August 30, 2010
Rose Warren Elementary School	Region 2		Opened in 1961.
Howard A. Wasden Elementary School	Region 2		Opened in 1955. Rebuilt in 2020.
Fredric W. Watson Elementary School	Region 1		Opened in 2001. Home of The Wranglers
Cyril Wengert Elementary School	Region 3, East		Opened in 1970.
Whitney Elementary School	Region 3		Opened in 1991.
Louis Wiener Jr. Elementary School	Region 3		Opened in 1993. Sister school to Charlotte Hill.
Elizabeth Wilheim Elementary School	Region 1		Opened in 1997.
Williams, Tom Elementary School	Region 3		Opened in 1959. Rebuilt in 2008.
Williams, Wendell P. Elementary School	Region 1		Opened in 1952 as Madison Elementary School. Rebuilt in 2002.
Eva Wolfe Elementary School	Region 1		Opened in 1997.
Elise L. Wolff Elementary School	Region 3, Southeast	9 Month	Opened in 2001.
Gwendolyn Woolley Elementary School	Region 1		Opened in 1991.
William V. Wright Elementary School	Region 2, Southwest	12 Month	Opened in August 2006.
Elaine Wynn Elementary School	Region 2		Opened in 1991. Named after Elaine Wynn, Ex-wife of casino developer Steve Wynn.

== Middle/junior senior high schools (6–8th grade) ==
Name	Region	Comments
Dr. William H. Bailey Middle School	Region 3, Northeast	Opened in 2005.
Ernest Becker Sr. Middle School	Region 1, Northwest	Opened in 1993, Awarded the highest national honor the Blue Ribbon of Excellence in 2000. Home of the Bighorns.
Jim Bridger Middle School	Region 1, Northeast	Opened in 1960. Magnet program with a STEM focus opened in 2003.
J. Harold Brinley Middle School	Region 1, Northwest	Opened in 1967. The school is part with the G.E.A.R U.P program, run by UNLV.
B. Mahlon Brown Academy of International Studies	Region 3, Southeast	Opened in 1983. Originally known as “B. Mahlon Brown Junior High School”. Magnet program opened in 2015.
Lyal Burkholder Academy of Environmental Science	Region 3, Southeast	Opened in 1972, built in 1954. Rebuilt in 2007. From 1954–1972, the building was Basic High School, which relocated to its current campus. Formerly Burkholder Middle School from August 2007 to May 2024. Magnet program opened in 2024.
Ralph Cadwallader Middle School	Region 1, Northwest	Opened in 2003.
Lawrence & Heidi Canarelli Middle School	Region 2, Southwest	Opened in 2002.
Helen C. Cannon Junior High School	Region 2, Southeast	Opened in 1977.
James E. Cashman Middle School	Region 2, Southwest	Opened in 1966. Academy of Science, Mathematics and Engineering established in 2008.
Francis H. Cortney Junior High School	Region 3, Southeast	Opened in 1999.
Brian & Teri Cram Middle School	Region 1, Northeast	Opened in 2001.
Edmundo "Eddie" Escobedo, Sr. Middle School	Region 1, Northwest	Opened in 2007.
Wilbur & Theresa Faiss Middle School	Region 2, Southwest	Opened in 2007.
Victoria Fertitta Middle School	Region 2, Southwest	Opened in 2001.
Clifford O. Findlay Middle School	Region 1, Northeast	Opened in 2004.
John C. Fremont Professional Development Middle School	Region 2, East	Opened in 1955. Will be building a new facility and become a K–8 school by 2021.
Elton M. Garrett Junior High School	Region 3, Southeast	Opened in 1978.
Frank F. Garside Junior High School	Region 2, Northwest	Opened in 1964.
Robert O. Gibson Leadership Academy	Region 1, Northwest	Opened in 1965. Magnet program established in 2008.
Barbara & Hank Greenspun Junior High School	Region 3, Southeast	Opened in 1991. Named after Barbara and Hank Greenspun, founding publishers of the Las Vegas Sun.
Kenny C. Guinn Middle School STEM Academy	Region 2, Southwest	Opened in 1979. Named after Kenny Guinn, former CCSD Superintendent (1969–1978) and governor of Nevada (1999–2007). STEM academy program established in 2015.
Barry and June Gunderson Middle School	Region 2	Opened in 2021.
Kathleen & Tim Harney Middle School	Region 3, East	Opened 2000.
Charles Arthur Hughes Middle School	Region 1, Northeast	Opened in 2004. Located in Mesquite.
Hyde Park Middle School	Region 2, Southwest	Opened in 1958. Magnet program established in 1994. Guitar, Orchestra, Choir, Band, Mascot is the Black Panther.
Indian Springs Middle School	Region 1, Northwest	Located in Indian Springs.
Walter Johnson Junior High School	Region 2, Southwest	Opened in 1991. Academy of international studies program established in 2015.
Carroll M. Johnston STEM Academy of Environmental Studies	Region 1, Northeast	Opened in August 2006. Transitioned to a wall-to-wall Magnet school in 2024. Home of the Bulldogs.
Duane D. Keller Middle School	Region 3, East	Opened in 1997.
K.O. Knudson Middle School	Region 2, East	Opened in 1961. Academy of Creative Arts, Language, and Technology program established in 1996. Magnet programs: band, choir, computer graphic design, dance, drama, mariachi, orchestra, TV production, technical theater, visual art
Clifford J. Lawrence Junior High School	Region 2, Southwest	Opened in 1999. Home of the Lions.
Justice Myron E. Leavitt Middle School	Region 1, Northwest	Opened in 2001. Home of the Patriots.
Lied STEM Academy	Region 1, Northwest	Opened in 1997. Home of the Navigators. Transitioned to a magnet program specializing in STEM in 2017.
W. Mack Lyon Middle School	Region 1, Northeast	Opened in 1950. Overton.
Jerome D. Mack Middle School	Region 2, Northeast	Opened in 2006.
Jack & Terry Mannion Middle School	Region 3, Southeast	Opened in 2004
Roy Martin Middle School	Region 3, East	Opened in 1959. Magnet program established in 2002. Houses the IB Middle Years Programme.
Bob Miller Middle School	Region 3, Southeast	Opened in 1999 Named after Bob Miller, former governor of Nevada (1989–1999).
Irwin & Susan Molasky Junior High School	Region 1, Northwest	Opened in 1998.
Mario C. & JoAnne Monaco Middle School	Region 3, Northeast	Opened in 2001.
Mike O'Callaghan Middle School i3 Learn Academy	Region 3, East	Opened in 1991. Magnet program established in 2018. Named after Mike O'Callaghan, former governor of Nevada (1971–1979).
William E. Orr Middle School	Region 2, East	Opened in 1965. Home of the Rockets.
Dell H. Robison Middle School	Region 3, East	Opened in 1973.
Sig Rogich Middle School	Region 2, Northwest	Opened in 2001. A U.S. Department of Education 2015 Blue Ribbon School.
Anthony Saville Middle School	Region 1, Northwest	Opened in 2004.
Grant Sawyer Middle School	Region 2, Southwest	Opened in 1994. Named after Grant Sawyer, former governor of Nevada (1959–1967).
Jack L. Schofield Middle School	Region 3, Southeast	Opened in 2001 Mascot - Schofield Flying Tigers
Marvin M. Sedway Middle School	Region 1, Northeast	Opened in 2001. Named after Marvin M. Sedway. Mascot- Sedway Ravens
Charles Silvestri Junior High School	Region 3, Southeast	Opened in 1998. Named after a former CCSD superintendent from 1981. Mascot - Silvestri Sharks
J.D. Smith Middle School	Region 3, Northeast	Opened in 1952. New building opened in 2020.
Theron L. Swainston Middle School	Region 1, Northeast	Opened in 1992.
Lois & Jerry Tarkanian Middle School	Region 2	Opened in August 2006. Named after Lois and Jerry Tarkanian.
Ed Von Tobel Middle School	Region 3, Northeast	Opened in 1966 as a 'junior high school', serving grades 7–9.
Del Webb Middle School	Region 3, Southeast	Opened in 2005. Named after the developer Del Webb who donated the land for the construction of the school.
Thurman White Academy of the Performing Arts	Region 3, Southeast	Opened in 1992. Originally known as “Thurman White Middle School”. Magnet school opened in 2015. Magnet programs: Band, Choir, Dance, Orchestra, Theater, Visual/Media Arts
C.W. Woodbury Middle School	Region 2, East	Opened in 1972, New Campus opened on August 11th 2025.

== High schools (9–12) ==
Name	Region	Mascot	Comments
Advanced Technologies Academy	Region 1, Northwest	Mavericks	Opened in 1994. Commonly known as "A-Tech." A magnet school.
Arbor View High School	Region 1, Northwest	Aggies	Opened in 2005.
Basic Academy of International Studies	Region 3, Southeast	Wolves	Opened in 1942 as Basic High School. Campus moved to a larger facility in 1972. Magnet program opened and name changed in 2015
Bonanza High School	Region 2, Southwest	Bengals	Opened 1976.
Boulder City High School	Region 3, Southeast	Eagles	Opened in 1949.
Canyon Springs High School	Region 1, Northeast	Pioneers	Opened in 2004. Includes Leadership and Law magnet school.
Centennial High School	Region 1, Northwest	Bulldogs	Opened 1999. Filming location for the movie Pay it Forward.
Chaparral High School	Region 2, East	Cowboys	Opened in 1973.
Cheyenne High School	Region 1, Northeast	Desert Shields	Opened in 1991.
Cimarron-Memorial High School	Region 1, Northwest	Spartans	Opened 1991.
Ed W. Clark High School	Region 2, Southwest	Chargers	Opened 1965. Includes magnet school programs: Academy of Mathematics, Science, and Applied Technology (A.M.S.A.T.), Academy of Finance (A.O.F.), and Teacher Education Academy at Clark High School (T.E.A.C.H.). Magnet program established in 1993. It is the only high school in Clark County to be named after a person.
College of Southern Nevada High School East	Region 3, Northeast		Limited entry program that allows juniors and seniors to take College of Southern Nevada (CSN) classes as their high school electives. Students attend high school classes on CSN's campuses
College of Southern Nevada High School South	Region 3, Southeast		Limited entry program that allows juniors and seniors to take College of Southern Nevada (CSN) classes as their high school electives. Students attend high school classes on CSN's campuses
College of Southern Nevada High School West	Region 3, Northwest		Limited entry program that allows juniors and seniors to take College of Southern Nevada (CSN) classes as their high school electives. Students attend high school classes on CSN's campuses
Coronado High School	Region 3, Southeast	Cougars	Opened 2001.
Del Sol Academy of the Performing Arts	Region 2, Southeast	Dragons	Opened in 2004 as “Del Sol High School”. Magnet program opened in 2015.
Desert Oasis High School	Region 2, Southwest	Diamondbacks	Opened in 2008.
Desert Pines High School	Region 3, East	Jaguars	Opened 1999. Includes magnet school that was established in 2002.
Durango High School	Region 2, Southwest	TrailBlazers	Opened 1993.
East Career and Technical Academy	Region 3, Superintendent School - East	Titans	Magnet. Opened for the 2008-2009 School Year.
Eldorado High School	Region 3, East	Firehawks	Opened in 1973. Rebranded as a STEAM Academy in 2014.
Foothill High School	Region 3, Southeast	Falcons	Opened 1999.
Green Valley High School	Region 3, Southeast	Gators	Opened in 1991. It is also one of the high schools picked for the stage production of High School Musical.
Indian Springs High School	Region 1, Northwest	Thunderbirds	
Las Vegas High School	Region 3, East	Wildcats	The original Las Vegas High School opened in 1905 with a tent in the city. The school made a new campus in 1930 that opened in 1931. After 62 years A new campus was made in 1992 that opened in 1993.
Las Vegas Academy of the Arts	Region 2, East	Pigeon	Magnet school. The school is located in the buildings of the original Las Vegas High School.
Laughlin High School	Region 3, Southeast	Cougars	Opened in 1992.
Legacy High School	Region 1	Longhorns	Opened in August 2006.
Liberty High School	Region 3, Southeast	Patriots	Opened 2003.
Moapa Valley High School	Region 1, Northeast	Pirates	Opened in 1914, Relocated to new campus in 1993.
Mojave High School	Region 1, Northeast	Rattlers	Opened 1996.
Northeast Career and Technical Academy	Region 1, Northeast	Eagles	Opened in 2023. Magnet school.
Northwest Career and Technical Academy	Region 1, Superintendent School - Northwest	Hawks	Opened 2007. Certified magnet high school.
Palo Verde High School	Region 2, Northwest	Panthers	Opened 1996.
Rancho High School	Region 3, Northeast	Rams	Opened in 1954. Magnet school established in 1997. Home to Rancho Academy of Aerospace and Medicine. Rebuilt campus opened in 2006.
Shadow Ridge High School	Region 1, Northwest	Mustangs	Opened in 2003.
Sierra Vista High School	Region 2, Southwest	Mountain Lions	Opened 2001.
Silverado High School	Region 3, Southeast	Skyhawks	Opened in 1994.
South Career and Technical Academy		Sabers	Opened in 2025.
Southeast Career Technical Academy	Region 3, Superintendent School - Southeast	Roadrunners	Formerly named Southern Nevada Vocational Technical Center (SNVTC). Opened in 1966. Magnet school.
Southwest Career Technical Academy	Superintendent School - Southwest	Coyotes	Opened 2009. Magnet school.
Spring Valley High School	Region 2, Southwest	Grizzlies	Opened 2004. Magnet program established in 2015.
Sunrise Mountain High School	Region 3, Northeast	Miners	Opened 2009.
Valley High School	Region 2, East	Vikings	Opened 1965. Magnet school. Program established in 1979.
Veterans Tribute Career Technical Academy	Region 1, Superintendent School - Northwest	Sentinels	Opened 2009. Magnet school with programs in public safety, law enforcement, 911-Dispatch, and emergency medical services. National Blue Ribbon School 2020.
Virgin Valley High School	Region 1, Northeast	Bulldogs	Located in Mesquite
Nevada Learning Academy	Region 2, Superintendent School - Central	Lightbulbs	Started in 1998 and opened as full-time in 2004. provides educational options through interactive online courses. It was one of the first online schools in the United States and is a fully recognized diploma granting school. Previously known as Virtual High School
West Career And Technical Academy	Region 2, Superintendent School - Southwest	Wranglers	Opened August 30, 2010. National Blue Ribbon School 2020.
Western High School	Region 1, Northwest	Warriors	Opened 1960.

== Alternative schools ==
Name	Type	Comments
Mission High School	Substance-use recovery	A 9–12th grade high school for students who are recovering from substance-use disorders. Opened in 2017, the school sits on the site of the former Biltmore Continuation School, which was a behavior school closed in 2016.
Desert Rose High School	At–risk teen parents Adult education	Operates two divisions: 1) as a public alternative high school for students over 17 years of age who are at-risk of not graduating, in particular teen parents; 2. as an adult high school for residents over 18 years of age who have already left school without graduating to earn a high school diploma, GED, or CTE training.
West Preparatory Academy	Education services	Opened in 1997, formerly named Charles I. West Middle School. Converted to a K through 12 campus in 2006.
Helen J. Stewart School	Special Education	School designed for students with specialized needs requiring interventions traditional schools are unable to offer for students aged 5–22 years old.
John F. Miller School	Special Education	School designed for students with specialized needs requiring interventions traditional schools are unable to offer for students aged 5–22 years old.
Variety School	Special Education	School designed for students with specialized needs requiring interventions traditional schools are unable to offer for students aged 5–22 years old.
Miley Achievement Center	Special Education	School designed for students with specialized needs requiring interventions traditional schools are unable to offer for students aged 5–22 years old.
Jo Mackey iLead Academy for the Digital Sciences	K-8 magnet school	Opened as "Jo Mackey Academy of Leadership and Global Communication" in 2004. Converted to a K through 8 campus in 2020.

== Future schools ==
- Cactus and Buffalo Drive High School (opening fall 2027)
- Skye Canyon Park Drive and Log Cabin Way High School (opening fall 2028)
- Mountain Edge High School (opening 2028)
- Southeast Choice High School (opening fall 2029)
- West Choice High School (opening fall 2030)
- One new Middle School (TBA)

Ten new elementary schools are under plan and then 7 additional new schools. Many new school projects under plan have been put on hold for now due to the rise of construction cost, the district's decline in enrollment and the development of a facility master plan to consider which new school projects will go forward or be canceled or delayed.

== See also ==
- Clark County School District
- List of school districts in Nevada
- Nevada Department of Education
