= List of hillside letters in Nevada =

This is a list of hillside letters (also known as mountain monograms) in the U.S. state of Nevada. There are at least 47 hillside letters, acronyms, and messages in the state, with possibly many more. The largest concentration is in the Carson City/Reno region.

Monogram	Town	Description	Location
A	Austin		39.4878°N 117.0715°W
A	Beatty	Angel's Ladies brothel	36.942571°N 116.729625°W
B Unertain	Henderson	Burkholder Middle School	36.0163°N 115.0016°W
B↓Q	Henderson	Basic High School, Quinton Robbinson	36.045°N 114.925°W
BM	Battle Mountain		40.603°N 116.972°W
B	Beatty		36.9156°N 116.7814°W
B (uncertain existence)	Blue Diamond		36.0468°N 115.406°W (uncertain location)
B (Planning)	Bonnie Clare		37.215833°N 117.113889°W
BC	Boulder City		35.99°N 114.8611°W
C	Carlin		40.6992°N 116.1023°W
C	Carson City		39.1581°N 119.7875°W
D	Reno	Damonte Ranch High School	39.4212°N 119.7027°W
D	Dayton		39.1996°N 119.571°W
D	Minden	Douglas High School	38.9803°N 119.8391°W
E	Las Vegas	Eldorado High School	36.1866°N 115.0089°W
E	Elko		40.813°N 115.708°W
E	Eureka		39.5126°N 115.9568°W
F	Fallon		39.4891°N 118.7535°W
F	Fernley		39.5947°N 119.272°W
FV	Fernley	Fernley High School	39.5839°N 119.2414°W
G	Gabbs		38.8609°N 117.9127°W
G	Reno	Galena High School	39.3767°N 119.7788°W
G	Goldfield		37.725°N 117.2259°W
G (uncertain existence)	Goodsprings		35.8326°N 115.4357°W (uncertain location)
H	Hawthorne		38.5269°N 118.6935°W
H	Hazen		39.5762°N 119.0511°W
IS	Indian Springs		36.5637°N 115.6815°W
L	Panaca	Lincoln County High School	37.8179°N 114.3379°W
L	Lovelock		40.1894°N 118.3931°W
L	Lund		38.8551°N 114.9956°W
M	Overton	Moapa Valley High School	36.5455°N 114.3987°W
M	Mountain City		41.8382°N 115.9567°W
N	Reno	University of Nevada	39.5592°N 119.8432°W
N (uncertain existence)	Las Vegas	Nellis AFB	36.2245°N 115.0221°W (uncertain location)
NV	Reno	North Valleys High School	39.604361°N 119.822167°W
O	Owyhee		41.9395°N 116.0866°W
P	Alamo	Pahranagat Valley High School	37.3655°N 115.1221°W
P (uncertain existence)	Pahrump		36.2068°N 115.9839°W (uncertain location)
R	Reno	Reno High School	39.5534°N 119.8643°W
R	Sparks	Reed High School	39.5606°N 119.7202°W
SAR	Fallon	Search and Rescue (Fallon NAS)	39.396°N 118.6266°W
S (uncertain existence)	Searchlight		35.4673°N 114.921°W (uncertain location)
SV	Wellington	Smith Valley High School	38.7472°N 119.3757°W
S	Sparks		39.5354°N 119.6944°W
S	Carson City	Stewart Indian School (closed)	39.1298°N 119.7313°W
SC	Spring Creek	Spring Creek High School	40.7756°N 115.6284°W
T	Tonopah		38.065°N 117.2359°W
TONOPAH MINING PARK	Tonopah		38.0727°N 117.2231°W
V	Mesquite	Virgin Valley High School	36.7923°N 114.1535°W
V	Virginia City		39.3096°N 119.6582°W
W	Wadsworth		39.6329°N 119.284°W (uncertain location)
W	Wells		41.1855°N 114.9338°W
WP	Ely	White Pine County	39.2413°N 114.9048°W
W	Winnemucca		40.9969°N 117.7623°W
Y	Yerington		38.9695°N 119.1344°W
