= List of school districts in Nevada =

This is a list of school districts in Nevada which are consolidated by county (and independent city for Carson City), There is a state-wide school authority exclusive to public charter schools, State Public Charter School Authority (SPCSA).

All Nevada school districts are independent governmental agencies. None are dependent on other layers of government.

As of the 2018-2019 school year, 66% of the public school students in Nevada were in the Clark County school district, 13% were in the Washoe County school district, 9% were in charter schools under the SPCSA, and 12% were in all other school districts and systems. As of 2025 the Clark County school district had the largest enrollment in Nevada and SPCSA the second largest.

== Public ==
- Carson City School District
- Churchill County School District
- Clark County School District
- Douglas County School District
- Elko County School District
- Esmeralda County School District
- Eureka County School District
- Humboldt County School District
- Lander County School District
- Lincoln County School District
- Lyon County School District
- Mineral County School District
- Nye County School District
- Pershing County School District
- Storey County School District
- Washoe County School District
- White Pine County School District

== Charter ==
In Nevada, publicly-funded charter schools not part of another school district are part of the Nevada State Public School Charter Authority, a consolidated, state-wide school district. After it absorbed six charter schools previously overseen by the Clark County School District, it became the second-largest local education authority in the state.

=== Churchill County ===
- Oasis Academy

=== Clark County ===
- Amplus Academy (2 schools)
- Beacon Academy of Nevada
- CIVICA
- Coral Academy of Science (6 schools)
- Democracy Prep
- Discovery Charter School (2 schools)
- Doral Academy (5 schools)
- Equipo Academy
- Explore Academy
- Founders Classical Academy of Las Vegas
- Futuro Academy
- Girls Athletic Leadership School
- Imagine School Mountainview
- Leadership Academy of Nevada
- Legacy Traditional Schools (3 schools)
- Mater Academy (3 schools)
- Nevada Prep
- Nevada Rise
- Nevada State High School (7 schools)
- Nevada Virtual Academy
- Pinecrest Academy of Nevada (5 schools)
- Quest Preparatory Academy
- Sage Collegiate
- Signature Prep
- Somerset Academy (7 schools)
- Sports Leadership and Management Academy
- TEACH Las Vegas

=== Elko County ===
- Elko Institute for Academic Achievement

=== Washoe County ===
- Alpine Academy
- Doral Academy of Northern Nevada
- Honors Academy of Literature
- Mater Academy of Northern Nevada
- Nevada Connections Academy
- Nevada State High School Meadowood
- Pinecrest Academy of Northern Nevada

=== White Pine County ===
- Learning Bridge Charter School
