= Demetria Obilor =

American TV personality and news anchor

- Occupations: News anchor, TV host, influencer
- Years active: 2013–present
- Website: www.demetriaobilor.com

Demetria Obilor is a television personality and former local news anchor. She is currently a host at REVOLT.

== Early life ==
Obilor was born to a white mother and Nigerian father. In 2005, she and her family moved to Las Vegas during her freshman year of high school. She graduated from Spring Valley High School then went on to the University of Kansas to earn a journalism degree.

== Local news career ==
Obilor first became a traffic reporter in 2013 for KSHB-TV. Subsequently, Obilor worked for news stations in Las Vegas (KLAS-TV) and Dallas (WFAA).

In addition to her traffic anchor work for KLAS-TV, she also hosted and produced a social media segment called, "Trending now" and a franchised segment called, "What's Driving You Crazy?"

== Body shaming incidents ==
Viewer comments about Obilor's appearance drew national attention on two occasions. In May 2017 Obilor shared a screenshot of an email from a WFAA-TV viewer. The email contained racist comments about her natural hairstyle.

Later, in November 2017, Obilor shared a WFAA-TV viewer's Facebook post that contained negative comments about her body shape. This incident garnered public support for Obilor from Chance the Rapper, Meghan McCain, and Gabrielle Union. Obilor responded to the incident by saying, "I don't care if a black woman wants to wear her hair straight or in braids, you don't get to say what's professional and what's not professional based on your white standard of beauty."

== Work as media personality ==
In 2022, Obilor transitioned to sports news as she began hosting the Sporting News 7 Podcast. The same year, Obilor became one of the hosts of Revolt's talk series, Black Girl Stuff.
