= Oasis Academy =

Oasis Academy can refer to:

- Multiple schools of the Oasis Charitable Trust in the United Kingdom
- Oasis Academy (Nevada) in Fallon, Nevada
