= Flight for Life (disambiguation) =

Flight for Life is a prehospital care service in the United States.

Flight for Life may also refer to:

- Flight for Life (Valley Hospital)
- Fight for Life (film), 1987 American drama film
- Fight for Life (TV series), 2007 British television series
- Fight for Life (video game), 1996 fighting video game
