= Josh Mauga =

American football player (born 1987)

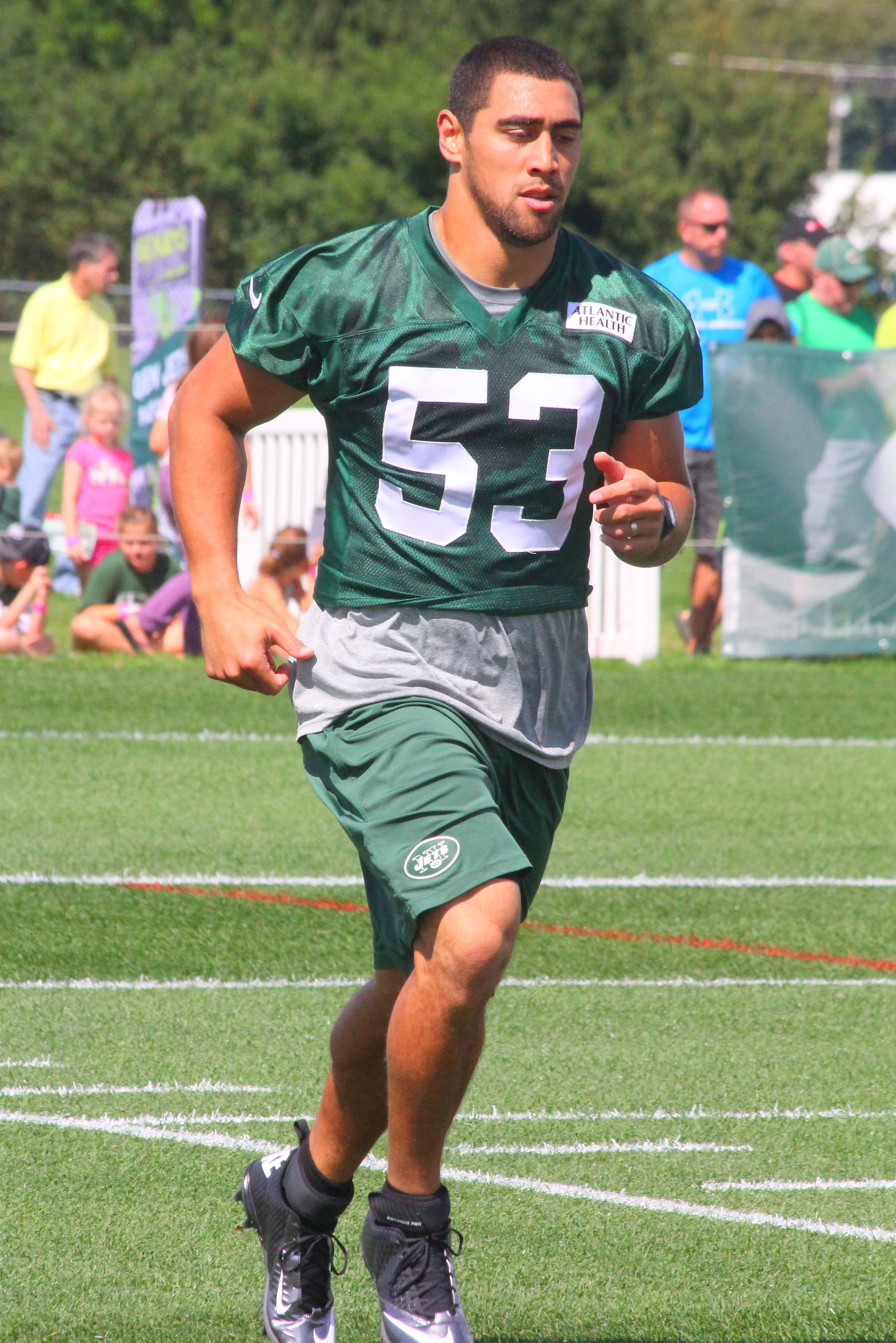
- Mauga with the New York Jets in 2013

No. 53, 90
- Position: Linebacker

Personal information
- Born: June 20, 1987 (age 39); Fallon, Nevada, U.S.
- Listed height: 6 ft 2 in (1.88 m)
- Listed weight: 245 lb (111 kg)

Career information
- High school: Churchill County (Fallon)
- College: Nevada
- NFL draft: 2009: undrafted

Career history
- New York Jets (2009–2013); Kansas City Chiefs (2014–2016)

Career NFL statistics
- Total tackles: 205
- Sacks: 1.5
- Interceptions: 3
- Stats at Pro Football Reference

Joshua Mauga /ˈmɔːɡə/ (born June 20, 1987) is an American former professional football player who was a linebacker in the National Football League (NFL). He played college football for the Nevada Wolf Pack and was signed by the New York Jets as an undrafted free agent in 2009.

== Early life ==
Mauga was born in Fallon, Nevada. He graduated in 2005 from Churchill County High School where he earned All-State and All-region honors. He was also the top heavyweight wrestler in the state of Nevada.

== College career ==
Mauga was named to The Sporting News All-Freshman team in 2005 after play all season games and notched 32 tackles. In 2006 was second on the team with 56 tackles and also intercepted 3 passes. He moved from outside linebacker to the inside linebacker position in that year. In 2007, he was the WAC leader in tackles before an MCL injury kept him out, he tied on second on team tackles with 82. He was named team captain, an honor rarely bestowed on a junior at Nevada. In his senior season he entered as a contender for WAC Defensive Player of the Year. He played through a torn pectoral muscle managing 54 tackles, 7.5 for loss and 3.5 sacks. He underwent surgery on his torn pectoral muscle on December 17 that cost him playing in the 2008 Humanitarian Bowl.

== Professional career ==
=== Pre-draft ===
Mauga left Nevada alongside Marko Mitchell for the 2009 NFL draft. He was limited to cardiovascular training and lower body weightlifting to be ready for the Nevada Pro Day.

=== New York Jets ===
==== 2009 ====
On August 16, 2009, Mauga signed with the New York Jets. He was waived/injured on August 28 and subsequently reverted to injured reserve, only to be released with an injury settlement on September 1.

Mauga was re-signed to the Jets' practice squad on December 10, 2009, but released December 20.

==== 2010 ====
He was re-signed to a future contract on January 6, 2010.

On September 3, 2010, the Jets waived Mauga who was unable to practice during training camp due to a concussion. Mauga was signed to the team's practice squad on September 6, 2010.

Mauga debuted for the Jets against the Green Bay Packers. On October 9, 2012, he was placed on injured reserve after suffering a torn pectoral muscle during a game against the Houston Texans on Monday Night Football.

=== Kansas City Chiefs ===
Mauga signed with the Kansas City Chiefs on July 24, 2014. On August 30, 2016, he was placed on injured reserve. On July 6, 2017, Mauga re-signed with the Chiefs. He was released on August 28, 2017.

== NFL career statistics ==
Legend
**Bold**	Career high

=== Regular season ===
Year	Team	Games		Tackles					Interceptions					Fumbles			
Year	Team	GP	GS	Cmb	Solo	Ast	Sck	TFL	Int	Yds	TD	Lng	PD	FF	FR	Yds	TD
2010	NYJ	8	0	14	12	2	0.0	1	0	0	0	0	0	0	0	0	0
2011	NYJ	**16**	1	25	17	8	0.0	1	1	11	0	11	1	0	0	0	0
2012	NYJ	5	0	5	4	1	0.0	0	0	0	0	0	0	0	0	0	0
2014	KAN	**16**	**16**	**103**	**82**	**21**	0.5	**4**	0	0	0	0	**3**	0	0	0	0
2015	KAN	14	14	58	46	12	**1.0**	**4**	**2**	**70**	0	**66**	**3**	0	0	0	0
		59	31	205	161	44	1.5	10	3	81	0	66	7	0	0	0	0

=== Playoffs ===
Year	Team	Games		Tackles					Interceptions					Fumbles			
Year	Team	GP	GS	Cmb	Solo	Ast	Sck	TFL	Int	Yds	TD	Lng	PD	FF	FR	Yds	TD
2010	NYJ	**3**	0	**3**	1	**2**	0.0	0	0	0	0	0	0	0	0	0	0
2015	KAN	2	**2**	**3**	**3**	0	0.0	0	**1**	**20**	0	**20**	**1**	0	0	0	0
		5	2	6	4	2	0.0	0	1	20	0	20	1	0	0	0	0

== Filmography ==
=== Film ===
Year	Film	Role	Notes
2019	Fast & Furious Presents: Hobbs & Shaw	Timo	
