= Andy Stokes =

American football player (born 1981)

No. 44
- Position: Tight end

Personal information
- Born: June 2, 1981 (age 45); St. George, Utah, U.S.
- Listed height: 6 ft 4 in (1.93 m)
- Listed weight: 257 lb (117 kg)

Career information
- High school: Moapa Valley (Overton, Nevada)
- College: Snow (2001); William Penn (2002–2004)
- NFL draft: 2005: 7th round, 255th overall pick

Career history
- New England Patriots (2005)*; Arizona Cardinals (2005)*; → Rhein Fire (2006); Seattle Seahawks (2007)*
- * Offseason or practice squad member only

Andy Stokes (born June 2, 1981) is an American former professional football tight end. He was selected with the final pick in the 2005 NFL draft, earning him the title of Mr. Irrelevant. Stokes played college football for William Penn University.

== Early life ==
Stokes attended Moapa Valley High School in Overton, Nevada, where he was an All-State football player, as well as playing baseball and basketball.

== College career ==
Stokes caught 32 passes for 417 yards (13.0 avg.) and a pair of touchdowns as a sophomore. The following year, he caught 30 passes for 408 yards (13.6 avg.) and three scores, adding 23 yards on three rushing attempts (7.7 avg.) and also posted five tackles (4 solos) on special teams. For that performance, he was named All-Mid-States Football Association honorable mention.

In 2004, Stokes was awarded third-team NAIA All-America and first-team All-MSFA honors. He was also named to Football Gazette's All-Region team. He finished second on the team with a career-high 42 receptions for 753 yards (17.9 avg.) and five touchdowns. He ran once for 16 yards, threw an option pass for 39 yards and recorded four tackles. In 31 games with the Statesmen, Stokes snatched 104 passes for 1,578 yards (15.2 avg.) and 10 touchdowns. He rushed four times for 39 yards (9.8 avg.) and had a 39-yard pass completion. He also recorded nine tackles (6 solos).

== Professional career ==
Stokes was selected by the New England Patriots in the seventh round of the 2005 NFL draft as the 255th overall pick earning the title Mr. Irrelevant an award that goes to the last player picked in the NFL draft. Despite college success, Stokes didn't make an NFL roster. He would play during the offseason with the New England Patriots, Arizona Cardinals, and the Seattle Seahawks.
