= Jordan Adams (basketball, born 1981) =

Canadian basketball player (born 1981)

Personal information
- Born: May 24, 1981 (age 45) Spokane, Washington, U.S.
- Listed height: 6 ft 3 in (1.91 m)
- Listed weight: 180 lb (82 kg)

Career information
- High school: Moapa Valley (Overton, Nevada)
- College: New Mexico (1999–2003)
- WNBA draft: 2003: 2nd round, 18th overall pick
- Drafted by: Minnesota Lynx
- Playing career: 2003–2005
- Position: Center, forward
- Number: 40

Career history

Playing
- 2003: Minnesota Lynx
- 2003–2004: COB Calais
- 2004–2005: Sporting Athens
- 2005: Birmingham Power

Coaching
- 2006–2008: Moapa Valley
- 2011–2012: UC Riverside (assistant)
- 2012–2015: Pepperdine (assistant)

Career highlights
- First-team All-MWC (2003); MWC Tournament MVP (2003); MWC Newcomer of the Year (2000); MWC All-Freshman Team (2000); NWBL All-Star (2005)
- Stats at Basketball Reference

Jordan Ashley Adams (born May 24, 1981) is an American-Canadian former professional basketball player and coach who was drafted by the Minnesota Lynx with the 18th overall pick in the 2003 WNBA draft. She played college basketball for New Mexico from 1999 to 2003, and represented the Canadian national team multiple times. In the 2010 FIBA World Championship for Women, Adams averaged 2.7 points and 1.7 rebounds per game. Adams was inducted into the University of New Mexico Athletics Hall of Fame in 2012.

== Early life ==
Adams played both basketball and volleyball at Moapa Valley High School in Overton, Nevada, where she was a four-time state volleyball champion and earned the state volleyball most valuable player (MVP) award on two occasions. Adams also led her team to the 1999 state basketball championship, and was named the Nevada Gatorade Player of the Year.

== New Mexico statistics ==
Legend
GP	Games played	GS	Games started	MPG	Minutes per game
FG%	Field goal percentage	3P%	3-point field goal percentage	FT%	Free throw percentage
RPG	Rebounds per game	APG	Assists per game	SPG	Steals per game
BPG	Blocks per game	PPG	Points per game	**Bold**	Career high

Year	Team	GP	Points	FG%	3P%	FT%	RPG	APG	SPG	BPG	PPG
1999-00	New Mexico	29	328	48.3%	29.2%	60.8%	4.8	0.6	0.8	2.1	11.3
2000-01	New Mexico	**35**	509	**49.1%**	32.7%	**79.1%**	5.5	1.3	0.6	3.0	14.5
2001-02	New Mexico	31	433	42.5%	**34.0%**	76.7%	5.8	2.1	0.4	3.0	14.0
2002-03	New Mexico	33	**528**	49.1%	30.6%	70.4%	**6.6**	**2.5**	**0.9**	2.6	**16.0**
Career		128	1798	47.2%	32.0%	72.8%	5.7	1.6	0.7	2.7	14.0

== WNBA career statistics ==
Legend
GP	Games played	GS	Games started	MPG	Minutes per game	RPG	Rebounds per game
APG	Assists per game	SPG	Steals per game	BPG	Blocks per game	PPG	Points per game
TO	Turnovers per game	FG%	Field-goal percentage	3P%	3-point field-goal percentage	FT%	Free-throw percentage
**Bold**	Career best	°	League leader

=== Regular season ===
Year	Team	GP	GS	MPG	FG%	3P%	FT%	RPG	APG	SPG	BPG	TO	PPG
2003	Minnesota	10	0	9.6	.394	.417	1.000	2.3	0.4	0.2	0.3	1.0	4.0

== Later career ==
Adams first coached at Moapa Valley, where she was head girls' basketball coach for two seasons, starting in 2006. She returned to New Mexico in 2008 as the Lobos' director of women's basketball operations for three years, and later worked as an assistant coach in the sport at University of California, Riverside and Pepperdine for a total of four seasons, until 2015.

== Personal life ==
Adams's half-brother and Gonzaga power forward Kyle Wiltjer played for the Houston Rockets of the NBA and various European clubs.

Adams is married to Eric Smith, an Eastern New Mexico University graduate; they have two daughters. The couple co-founded Nuevo, a New Mexican cuisine-related subscription box, in January 2019. The couple sold Nuevo in 2020. That same year Adams-Smith acquired The Elevated Closet, an online clothing boutique and apparel manufacturer specializing in clothing for tall women. In October of 2026 she discontinued the manufacturer operations of The Elevated Closest. The brand is now focused on bringing awareness, through social media, to small brands that specialize in clothing for women over 6 feet tall. Jordan currently serves as a coach and staff member for Austin Velocity, one of the largest youth volleyball clubs in the Austin area.

She earned her bachelor's degree in undergraduate studies with an emphasis in journalism and physical education from the University of New Mexico in 2003, and also earned her master's in special education from Western Governors University, in Salt Lake City, Utah, in 2010.
