= Harvey Dahl =

American football player (born 1981)

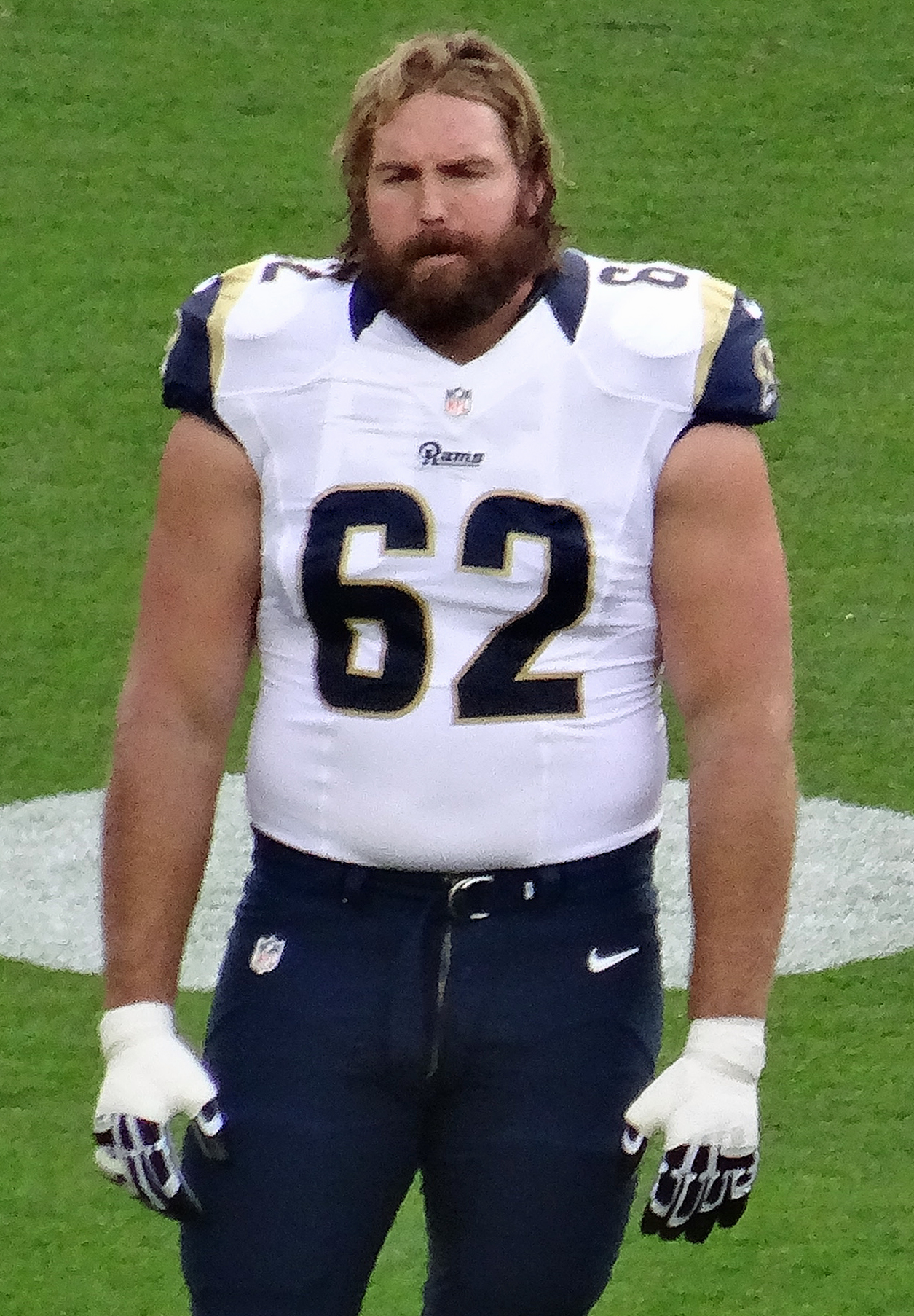
- Dahl in the 2013 preseason.

No. 62, 73, 76
- Position: Offensive guard

Personal information
- Born: June 24, 1981 (age 45); Fallon, Nevada, U.S.
- Listed height: 6 ft 5 in (1.96 m)
- Listed weight: 306 lb (139 kg)

Career information
- High school: Churchill County (Fallon)
- College: Nevada
- NFL draft: 2005: undrafted

Career history
- Dallas Cowboys (2005)*; San Francisco 49ers (2005–2007); → Rhein Fire (2006); Atlanta Falcons (2007–2010); St. Louis Rams (2011–2013)
- * Offseason or practice squad member only

Awards and highlights
- 3× First-team All-WAC (2003, 2004)

Career NFL statistics
- Games played: 87
- Games started: 82
- Fumble recoveries: 2
- Stats at Pro Football Reference

Harvey J. Dahl (born June 24, 1981) is an American former professional football player who was a guard in the National Football League (NFL) for the San Francisco 49ers, Atlanta Falcons and St. Louis Rams. He played college football for the Nevada Wolf Pack and was signed by the Dallas Cowboys as an undrafted free agent in 2005.

== Early life ==
Dahl attended Churchill County High School. As a senior, he received All-league, All-Northern Nevada and All-state honors. His #59 number was retired by Churchill County in January 2009.

In wrestling, he was a three-time zone champion and also won the state championship at 215 lbs. in 1999.

== College career ==
Dahl accepted a football scholarship from the University of Nevada. As a true freshman, he started the last four games at offensive tackle and contributed to running back Chance Kretschmer becoming the nation's leading rusher with 1,732 yards.

As a junior, he contributed to an offensive line that only allowed 17 sacks and to Kretschmer rushing for 1,162 yards, including five 100-yard rushing games.

As a senior, he was named to the Outland Trophy and Lombardi Award watch lists in July, prior to the start of the 2004 season. He also played in the 2005 East-West Shrine Game.

In 2016, he was inducted into the Nevada Athletics Hall of Fame.

== Professional career ==
=== Dallas Cowboys ===
Dahl was signed as an undrafted free agent by the Dallas Cowboys after the 2005 NFL draft on April 28. He was waived on June 3.

=== San Francisco 49ers ===
On June 8, 2005, he was claimed off waivers by the San Francisco 49ers. He was waived on August 30 and signed to the practice squad on September 5. On December 20, he was promoted to the active roster and was declared inactive for the last 2 games.

On January 11, 2006, he was allocated to the Rhein Fire in NFL Europe. He made the regular-season roster, but was declared inactive for 9 games and was active but did not play in three others. He appeared in 4 contests, with his first professional game against the St. Louis Rams.

In 2007, he was released before the start of the season on September 1. He was signed to the practice squad on September 2.

=== Atlanta Falcons ===
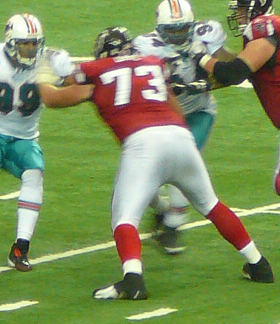
Dahl with the Falcons in 2009

On October 8, 2007, Dahl was signed by the Falcons off the San Francisco practice squad after the Falcons placed offensive tackle Wayne Gandy on injured reserve. He was declared inactive in 8 games. He was a reserve player in the season finale against the Seattle Seahawks.

In 2008, he became a full-time starter for the Falcons at right guard at the age of 27. He established a name for himself as one of the Falcon's toughest, nastiest players. He also helped pave the way for the Falcons' Pro Bowl running back Michael Turner and the Falcons' run game, which was second in the league in rushing. Dahl was competent in pass blocking as well, as he and the rest of the Falcons offensive line only allowed 17 sacks (a franchise record) of 2008 AP Offensive Rookie of the Year quarterback Matt Ryan.

In 2009, he started 11 games, missing 6 contests with an Achilles' tendon and an ankle injury he suffered against the Tampa Bay Buccaneers. On October 11, Dahl and San Francisco 49ers head coach Mike Singletary got into a spat on the field where Singletary told Dahl, "You better be happy you didn't play back in my day! If I could see you on the field!..." to which Dahl replied, "Suit up, then!". After Dahl left in free agency, he was replaced with Garrett Reynolds. On December 29, he was placed on the injured reserve list.

=== St. Louis Rams ===
On July 29, 2011, he was signed as a free agent by the St. Louis Rams. He was named the starter at right guard over the incumbent Adam Goldberg and played in 16 games. On December 18, Dahl was flagged for a holding penalty against the Cincinnati Bengals and yelled "That's not fucking holding!" into referee Jerome Boger's open microphone as he was announcing the holding penalty to the crowd. As a result, the expletive was heard throughout the stadium and on television. Boger further assessed an unsportsmanlike conduct penalty and Dahl had to later apologize for the incident. CBS color commentator Dan Dierdorf also apologized on-air because Dahl's fleeting expletive slipped past the CBS censors. The incident re-introduced discussion as to installing a delay in live NFL broadcasts of a few seconds to allow for censorship of unacceptable language or incidents.

In 2012, he started 14 games at right guard, before suffering a torn bicep against the Minnesota Vikings. He was placed on the injured reserve list on December 17. Shelley Smith started the last 2 games in his place.

In 2013, he only started 9 games at right guard, after suffering a sprained left MCL during the eighth game against the Seattle Seahawks. He was replaced with Rodger Saffold during the time he was out. On March 10, 2014, Dahl was released in a salary-cap move.
