= Flight for Life (Valley Hospital) =

Southern Nevada's first air ambulance service

Flight For Life
- Company type: Air Ambulance
- Industry: EMS
- Founded: 1980 - December 9, 2001
- Headquarters: Las Vegas, Nevada
- Website: FlightforLife.com

Valley Hospital Medical Center established Southern Nevada's first air ambulance service, Flight for Life, in 1980. Metro Aviation sold the program to Mercy Air on December 4, 2001, effectively shutting down the Flight for Life service under that name, although the service was still provided.

== History ==
The first helicopter was an Aerospatiale SA.316/319 Alouette III, decorated with the Star of Life. The helicopter was owned by RTS Helicopters and was used for 2 years. In 1982 RTS traded in the Alouette for a newer AS-355F2 (N57901) with a deep blue and sea green paint scheme. On December 7, 1983, N57901 was destroyed when it collided with Black Mountain. The hospital put a memorial plaque on the helipad. Valley Hospital signed a contract with Medical Aviation Inc. (a subsidiary of Metro Aviation), to sustain the service. With the new contract, Valley Hospital received a BO105 CBS4 (N10VH) named Lifeguard 1 based at the hospital, as well as loaner aircraft to use when the main helicopter was in heavy maintenance. Lifeguard 1 had an orange and black paint scheme, with a silver stripe. In 1998, Valley Hospital received a second BO105 CBS5 (N911VH), which they dubbed Lifeguard 1, renaming the older helicopter Lifeguard 2. Metro Aviation shipped Valley Hospital another upgraded helicopter, a BK117 B2 (N117VH). This again necessitated renaming the fleet, with the newest helicopter again being designated Lifeguard 1. Metro Aviation sold the program to Mercy Air on December 4, 2001, effectively shutting down the Flight for Life service under that name, although the service was still provided.

== Service area and bases ==
Valley Hospital's Flight for Life program served southern Nevada, Mohave County/Strip District of Arizona, parts of Dixie (Utah), and parts of southern California. The program had bases located at Valley Hospital Medical Center, Mesquite Airport(N10VH), Pahrump, Nevada(N911VH), and Whiskey Pete's in Primm, Nevada(N10VH). The maintenance hangar for the fleet was located at Cheyenne Air Center at North Las Vegas Airport. The majority of maintenance was conducted on the helipad at Valley Hospital, which had a jet fuel tank buried in the parking lot, permitting on-site refueling.

== Dispatch ==
Flight For Life used dedicated frequencies, 155.280 MHz and 155.340 MHz, to communicate with other aircraft in the fleet and base operations. Prior to 1992 dispatch was provided by a dedicated center at Valley Hospital. These individuals were trained in-house and also participated as hospital operators. Following 1992 dispatch services were contracted out to Mercy Ambulance, who communicated with other fire and law enforcement agencies. Mercy Ambulance dispatch provided flight following communications in addition.

== Incidents and accidents ==
On December 7, 1983, N57901 was destroyed when it collided with Black Mountain. The pilot attempted an auto-rotation after the left engine cowling came apart mid flight. Pilot Paul Kinsey, flight nurse Jessica Hilt, and paramedic Ernest Chris Hasselfeld died.

N105HH was destroyed when the Messerschmitt-Bölkow-Blohm Bo105 smashed into a patch of land just off Old Ben Road near Indian Springs on April 3, 1999. Pilot James Bond Jr., and two flight nurses Kathy Batterman, and Leroy Shelton were killed. The NTSB ruled that a combination of pilot error and punishing weather with reduced visibility (less than 50 yards) caused the crash. An elementary school in Las Vegas was named in Kathy Batterman's honor.

On November 13, 2000, N911VH had a "hard landing". The pilot attempted to avoid powerlines after a car appeared to be in the landing zone. Pilot Tim Rego, flight nurse Lisa Freeman, and paramedic Rick Loughry escaped with minor injuries.

N417MA was destroyed on September 7, 2002, after the rotor blades delaminated. The crash killed pilot Marshall Butler, flight nurse Ana Coburn, and paramedic Kalaya Jarbsunthie. Marshall Butler and Ana Coburn of were former Flight for Life employees. This fatal crash was not Flight for Life accident, it was a Mercy Air helicopter.
