= Angel's Ladies =

Legal brothel in Beatty, Nevada

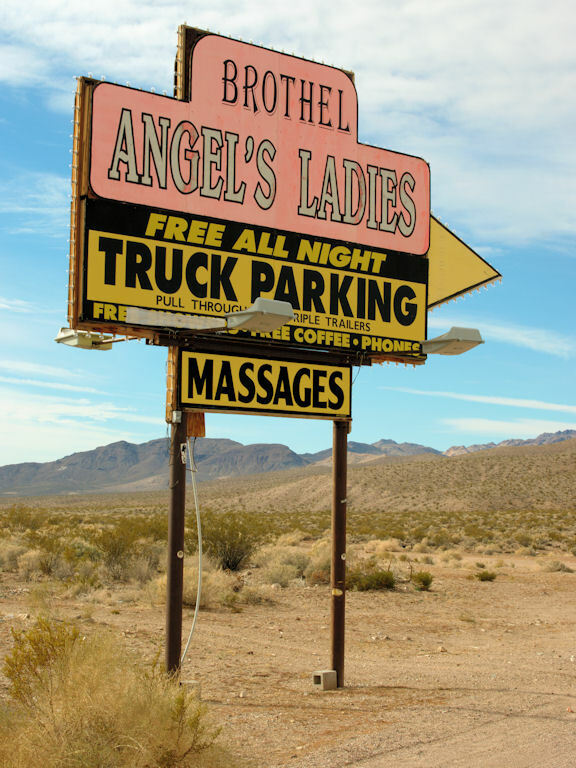
- Angel's Ladies sign

- Location in Nevada
- Former names: Circle C Ranch; Vickie's Star Ranch; Fran's Star Ranch
- Location: Beatty, Nevada
- Coordinates: 36.9419003°N 116.7367822°W
- Operator: Mack Moore

Construction
- Closed: August 2014

Angel's Ladies was a legal brothel located three miles (4.8 km) north of Beatty, Nevada, United States, on a 70-acre ranch (28 ha). It was known as Fran's Star Ranch until it was renamed Angel's Ladies in 1997 after being purchased by Mack and Angel Moore. It has been closed since August 2014.

== History ==
Prior to the 1970s, the brothel had been known variously as Circle C Ranch and Vickie's Star Ranch. On May 28, 1977, an accident during a promotional stunt on the property resulted in the crash of a twin-engined light aircraft. The wreck has been located next to the brothel's billboard ever since, and used as a spectacle to attract customers from the road. Mack Moore attempted to sell Angel’s Ladies in 2007, but ended up taking it over again two years later as a result of foreclosure. He subsequently sold the business again in 2010, this time for $1.8 million, and continued to run it as a leaseholder. On August 10, 2014, he retired and closed the business.

== In the media ==
A documentary film called Angel's Ladies was released in 2000, featuring the brothel, its owners, and its staff. The brothel also appears in the 2011 photography book Nevada Rose by Marc McAndrews as part of a project about the brothels of rural Nevada.

During the brothel's final days of operation, the band Disappointment #1 performed there and recorded interviews. They released an album, "Live at Brothel Angel's Ladies", in October 2015.

== See also ==
- Prostitution in Nevada
- List of brothels in Nevada
