= Yerington High School =

Location
- 114 Pearl Street; Yerington, Nevada 89447; United States; 38.991538°N 119.160244°W

Information
- School type: Comprehensive Public High School
- Status: Operating
- School district: Lyon County School District
- Superintendent: Wayne Workman
- CEEB code: 290185
- NCES School ID: 320030000180
- Principal: Kathy Bomba-Edgerton
- Teaching staff: 17.00 (on an FTE basis)
- Grades: 9–12
- Gender: Coeducational
- Enrollment: 413 (2024-2025)
- Student to teacher ratio: 24.29
- Campus type: Suburban
- Color
- Mascot: Lion
- Website: www.yhs.lyoncsd.org

Yerington High School is a public high school in Yerington, Nevada, United States, a town southeast of Carson City, Nevada. 400+ students are enrolled as of 2020.

== Academics ==
As of 2025, Yerington High School operates on an 8:00 a.m. to 2:30 p.m. schedule. The only exception is on Friday that the school starts at 8:00 a.m. and ends at 1:15 p.m. This includes seven periods of instruction and lunch.

=== Enrollment ===
Yerington High School had an enrollment of 468 students in 2010-11 school year, and was down to 367 students in 2015-16. Yerington High School is integrated, in the school years of 2011-2012, the classes were 13.8% American Indian/Alaska Native, 2.3% Asian, 31.7% Hispanic, 0.5% Black, and 50% White.

== Athletics ==
Currently, Yerington High School offers its students 10 different sport teams. These sports include golf, baseball, softball, basketball, football, wrestling, volleyball, track, soccer, and cross country. Volleyball Division A State champions: 2006, 2007, 2008, 2010, 2011, 2013, 2014, 2015, 2019.
