= Churchill County School District =

School district in Nevada, US

Coordinates: 39.468°N 118.777°W

The Churchill County School District is a K–12 school district serving Churchill County, Nevada.

== History ==
The district was established in 1903. And in 1910 the Churchill county high was made.

Summer E. Stephens is the superintendent. The Nevada Association of School Superintendents (NASS) awarded her the 2023 Nevada Superintendent of the Year prize. In 2023 she announced she was leaving her position.

== Schools ==
The school district operates three elementary schools, one middle school, and 1 high school: Churchill County High School.

Schools:

- Churchill County High School (Grades 9-12)
- Churchill County Middle School (Grades 6-8)
- Numa Elementary School (Grades 4-5)
- E.C. Best Elementary School (Grades 2-3)
- Lahontan Elementary School (Kindergarten and Grade 1)
- Northside Early Learning Center (Pre-Kindergarten)

Previously the county operated a one room school in the Dixie Valley area, but by 1971 the board of trustees opted to close the school. At the time 10 Dixie Valley students were enrolled in the schools in Fallon.

== See also ==
- Oasis Academy (Nevada) - Charter school
