= Churchill County High School =

Public school in Nevada, United States

Coordinates: 39.463317°N 118.784443°W

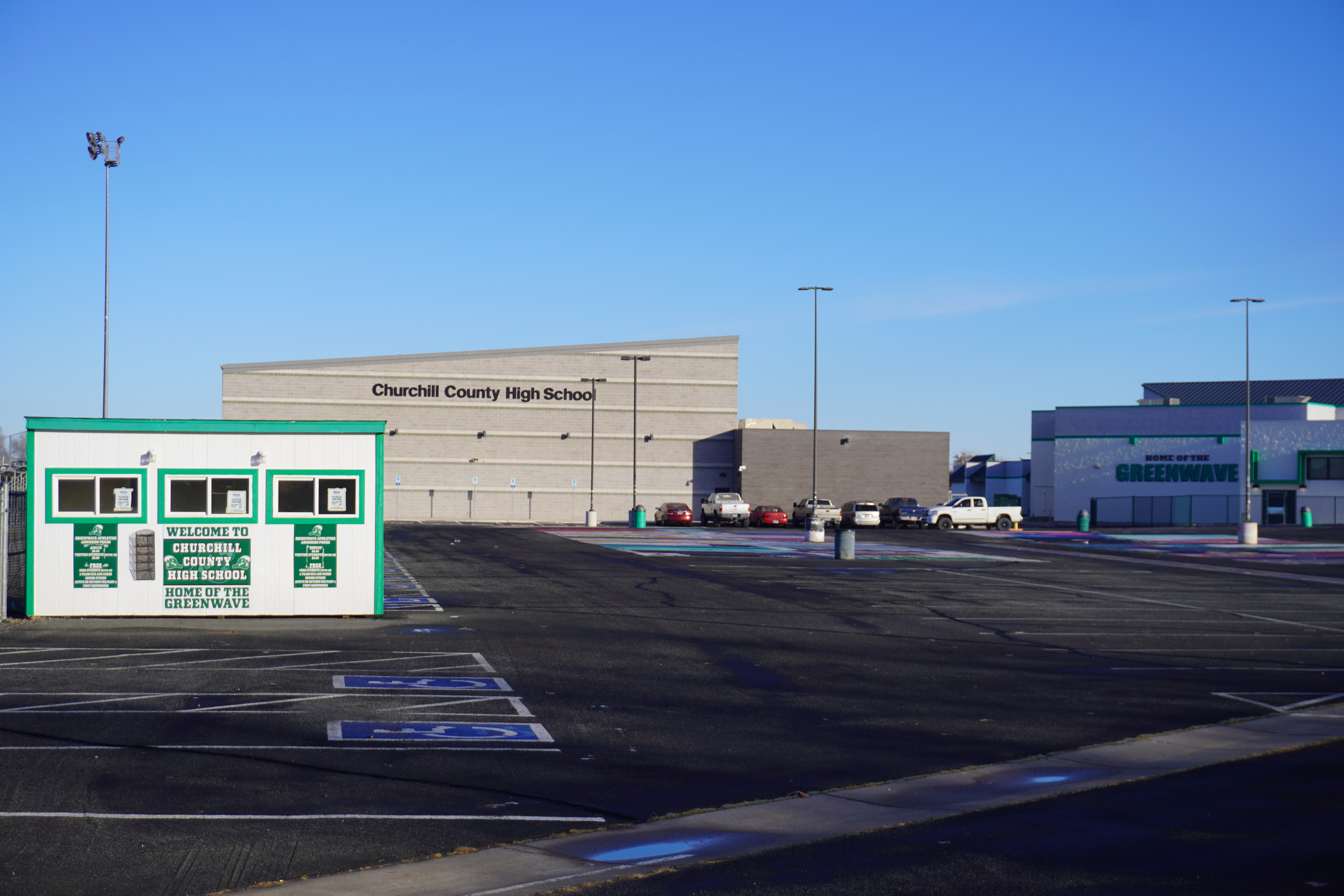
- 1222 South Taylor Street; Fallon, NV 89406

Information
- Type: Public
- Established: 1917
- School district: Churchill County School District
- Principal: Tim Spencer
- Staff: 48.00 (FTE)
- Grades: 9-12
- Enrollment: 1,025 (2024-2025)
- Student to teacher ratio: 21.35
- Colors: Green and White
- Athletics conference: Northern Nevada Division 1A
- Mascot: Greenwave
- Website: https://cchs.churchillcsd.com/

Churchill County High School is located in Fallon, Churchill County, Nevada. The building was built in 1917, and was opened in 1920.

== Academics ==
Part of the Churchill County School District, operating under the Principal Tim Spencer, the school has around 1025 students in grades 9–12.

Education standards are very high, with Churchill County's Academic Team being placed 1st in the Nevada Academic League in results published in April 2006, and a teacher at the School, Steve Johnson, being a winner of the Presidential Awards for Excellence in Mathematics and Science Teaching, the Nation's highest honors for teachers of mathematics and science, in 1999.

== Notable alumni ==
- Alan Bible, lawyer and politician, served as a United States Senator from Nevada from 1954 to 1974.
- Harvey Dahl, football offensive guard for the St. Louis Rams - Jersey #59 retired in January 2009.
- Josh Mauga, football player for the Kansas City Chiefs - Jersey Number 30 retired on October 27, 2011.
- Aarik Wilson, long jumper and triple jumper; athlete in the 2008 Summer Olympics.

Churchill County High School has a long history of students serving in the uniform services as well as being accepted into prominent academic institutions.

== Discipline ==
In November 2006 closed circuit television was installed, the first school in the state to have such a comprehensive system, and has proven effective in enhancing discipline.

This was needed since according to a regional survey, almost 7% of Churchill County students have used methamphetamine, and anecdotal data points to a number closer to 15%.

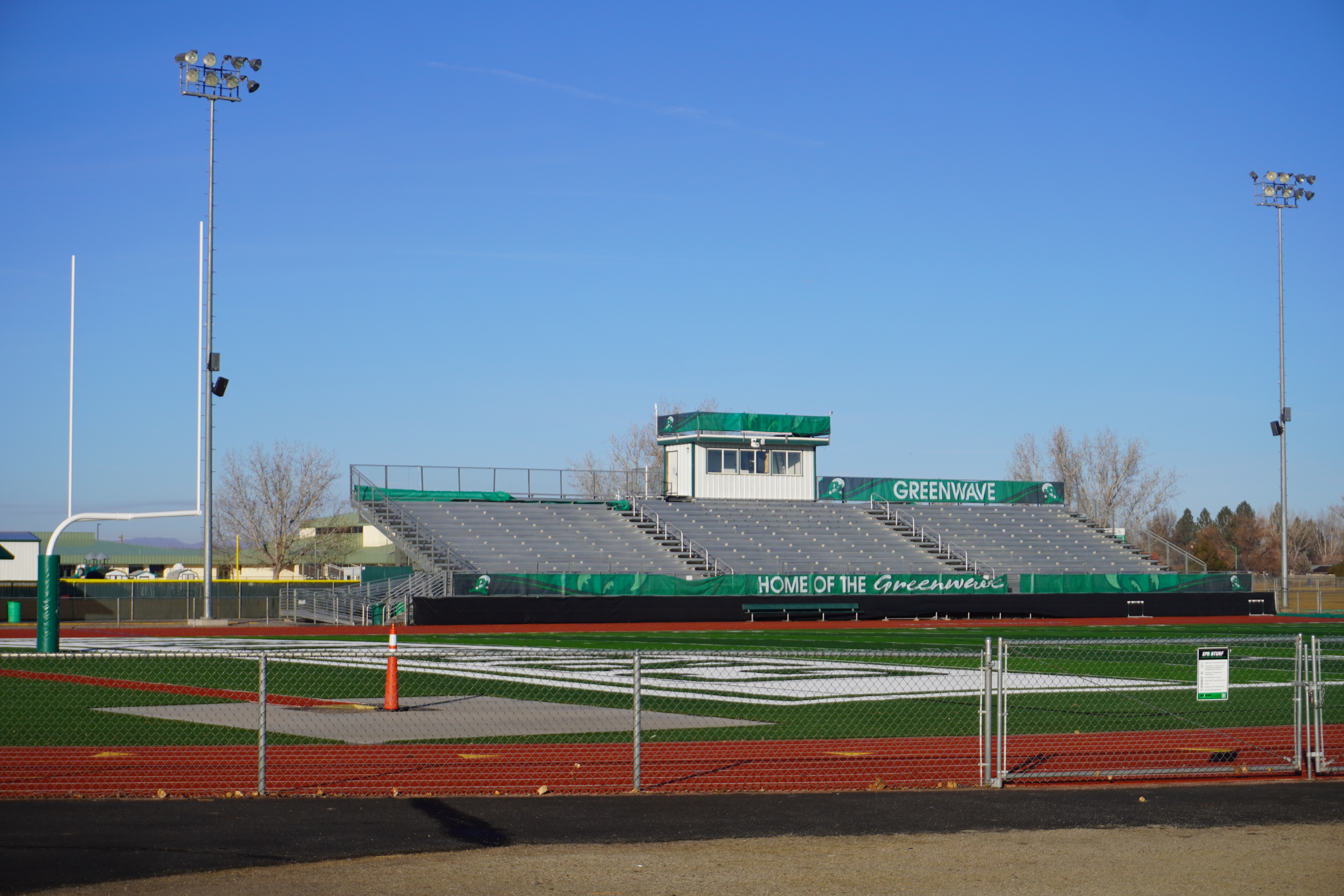
Churchill County High School football and track field

== Pellet gun incident ==
On January 22, 2020, a male student brought a pneumatic pellet gun into his classroom. He did not harm any students. He was later arrested the next day for possession of a weapon on school grounds.

== See also ==
- List of high schools in Nevada
