= Basic Academy of International Studies =

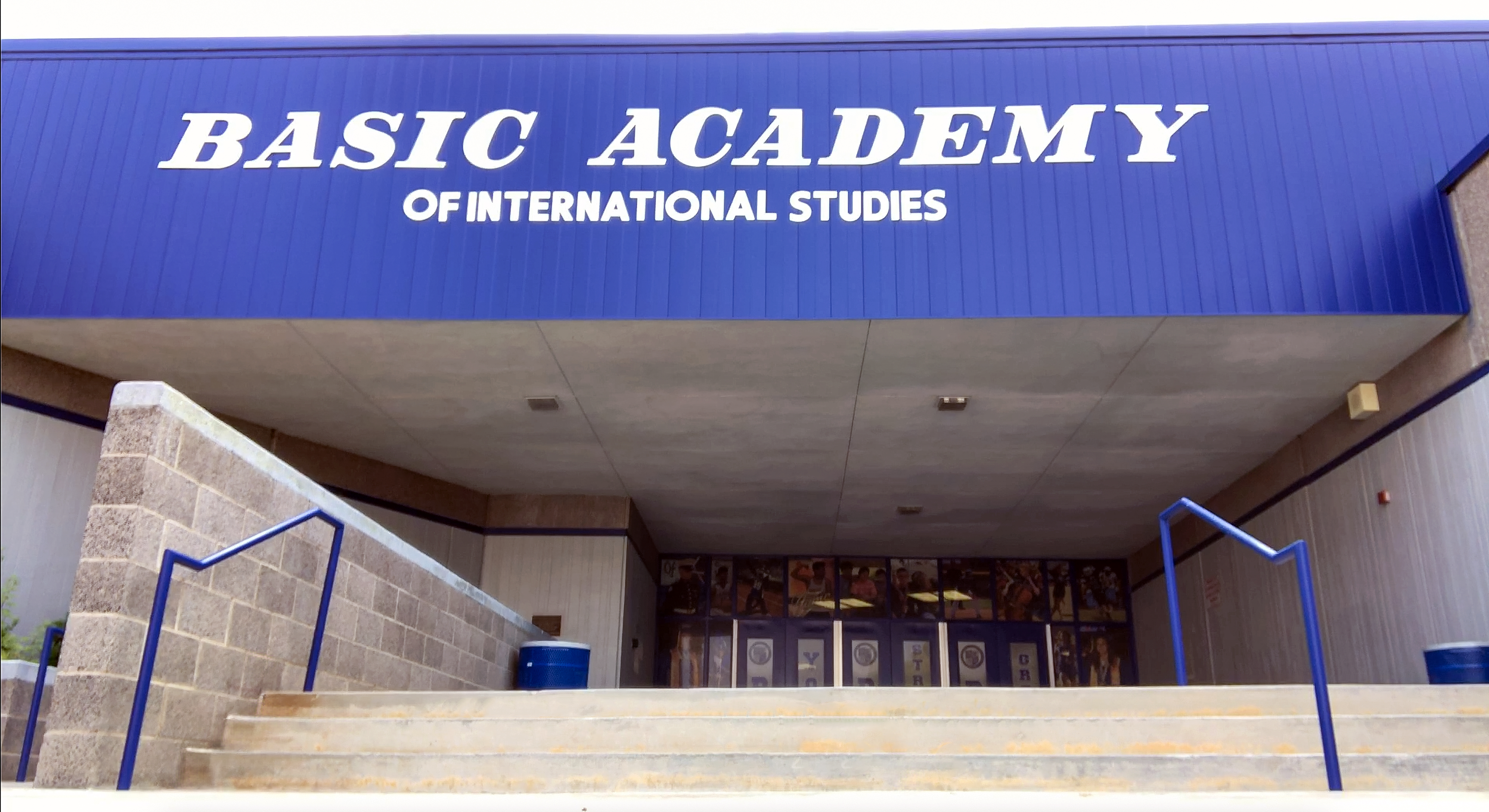
- Front of the school

Location
- 400 Palo Verde Dr; Henderson, Nevada 89015; United States; 36.0337°N 114.9621°W

Information
- Former name: Basic High School
- School type: Public School
- Motto: Once a wolf, always a wolf.
- Established: 1942
- School district: Clark County School District
- Area trustee: Linda Cavazos (District G)
- NCES School ID: 320006000007
- Principal: Tati Hadavi
- Staff: 200
- Faculty: 102.00 (FTE)
- Grades: 9–12
- Enrollment: 2,514 (2023-2024)
- Student to teacher ratio: 24.65
- Colors: Blue and silver
- Athletics conference: NIAA: Sunrise 4A Region
- Rival: Foothill High School; Green Valley High School
- Newspaper: Lone Wolf
- Yearbook: El Lobo
- Website: Official website

Basic Academy of International Studies (also Basic Academy, previously Basic High School) is a public high school with an accredited International Baccalaureate magnet program in Henderson, Nevada. It is part of the Clark County School District. Established in 1942, 11 years before the city of Henderson was incorporated, Basic is named after Basic Magnesium Inc, a critical World War II munitions materials factory.

== School name ==
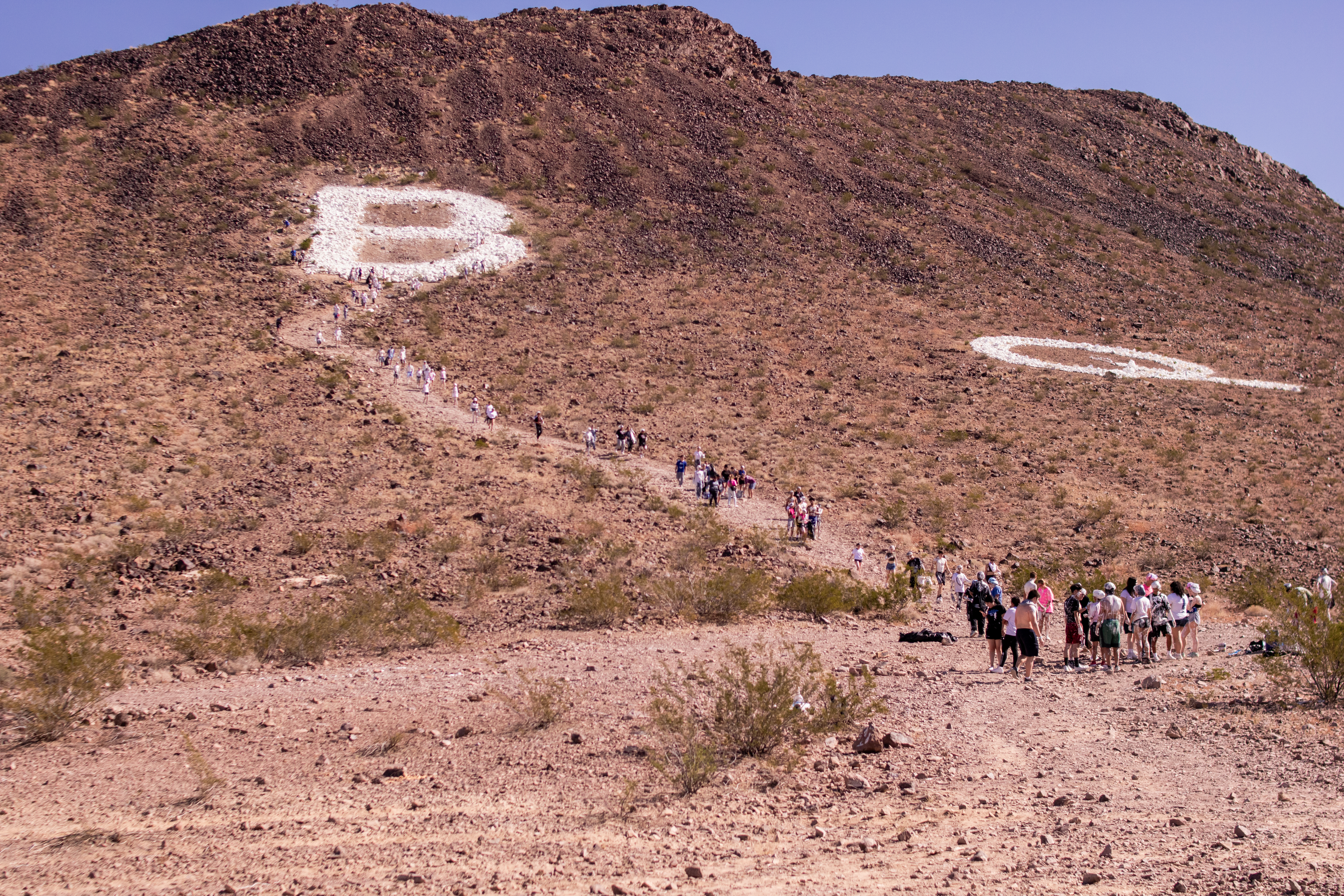
The "B" on the side of the River Mountain Range.

Along with Basic Road and a few businesses with "Basic" in the name, Basic High School was named after the World War II-era Basic Magnesium refinery, which then employed nearly all the town-site's residents. Henderson was originally referred to as the "Basic town site" until 1946 when it took on the name Henderson.

In 2015, the Clark County School District Trustees approved a name change sought by then-principal David Bechdel to "Basic Academy of International Studies." This was to reflect the addition of its International Baccalaureate magnet program, which are typically referred to as academies.

Visible from most of the southeast part of the Las Vegas Valley, a large "B" and smaller "Q" are painted over boulders on side of the River Mountains range that surrounds that corner of Henderson. The "B" is repainted every year by that year's senior class. The "Q" memorializes Quinton Robbins, an alumnus of the school who was a victim of the 2017 Route 91 festival mass-shooting.

== History and traditions ==
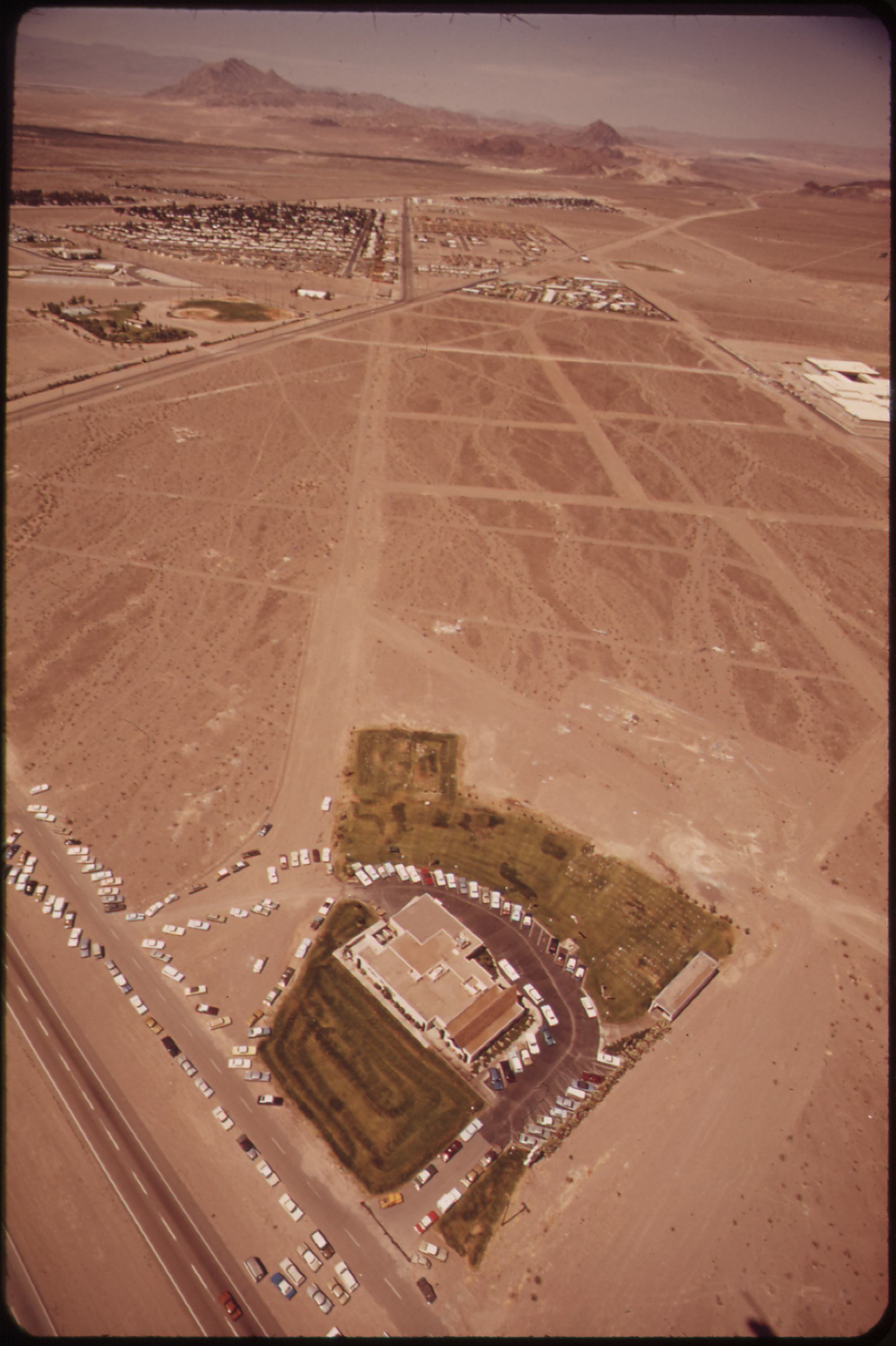
Basic's current campus (upper right) including Lake Mead Parkway (left) along with Palm Mortuary and Boulder Highway (bottom) in May 1972.

Predating the city of Henderson, the Railroad Pass School District (now defunct) had a one room school house built in 1932. As thousands moved to the area to work at the Basic Magnesium Inc. plant, the World War II magnesium refinery responsible for a quarter of metal need to build the Allied Forces' war efforts supply, like bomb casings, aircraft and tank parts, and engines. In 1942, the one room schoolhouse became a high school. It graduated its first class of ten students in 1943.

In 1954 it moved to a site near the Water Street District off of Van Wagenen Street and Pacific Avenue, the current site of Lyal Burkholder Academy, a middle school. Since, 1973 Basic High School has been located at 400 Palo Verde Drive.

From 1942 until 1991 when Green Valley High School opened its doors, Basic was the only high school in Henderson. Since then, the two schools have developed a rivalry. During the fall football season, the varsity football teams face off in the Henderson Bowl, which is aired on local television. The winner of the game wins the eponymous Bowl, covered with plaques inscribed with each year's winner.

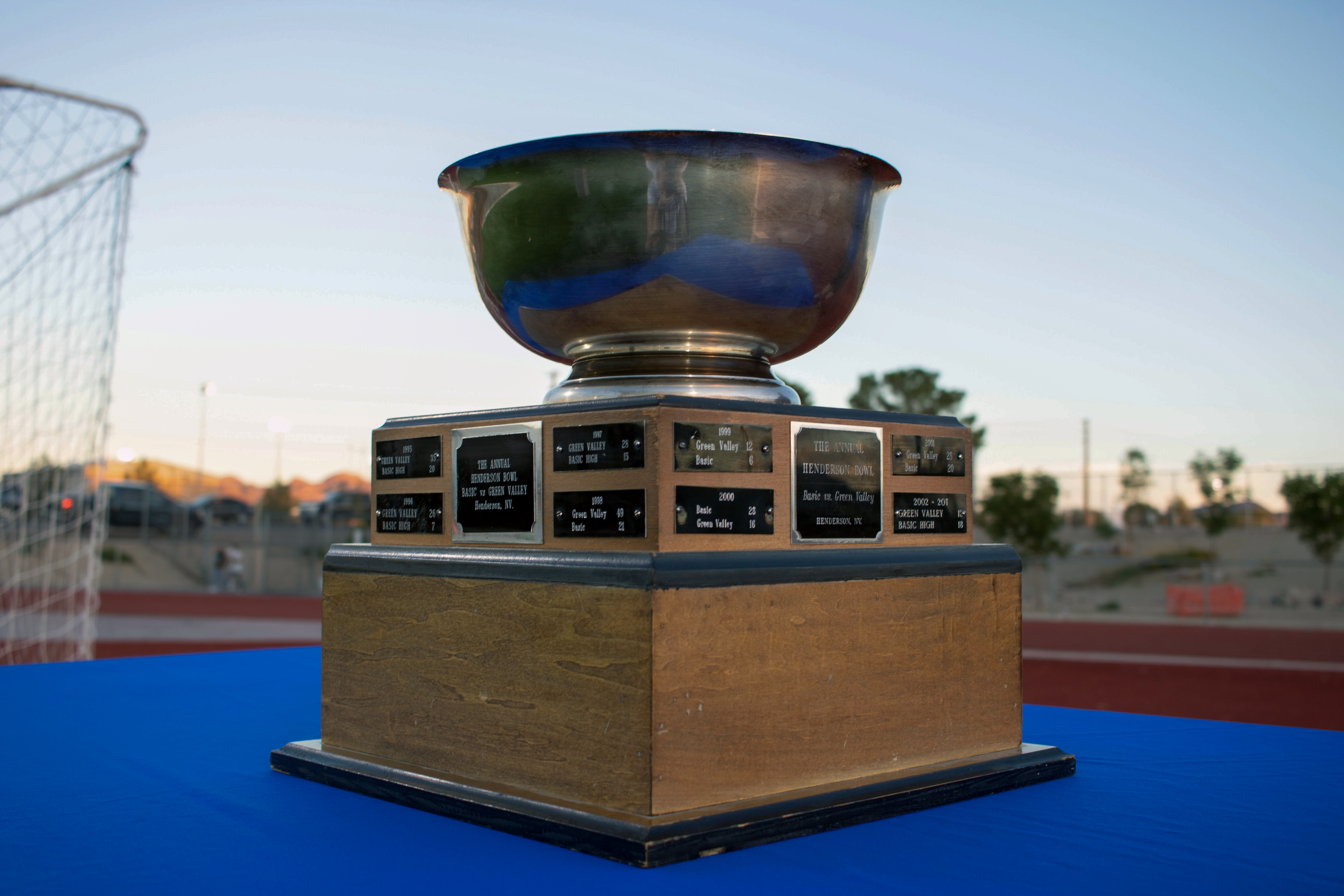
The Henderson Bowl during the 2022 game against Green Valley High School.

In addition to Green Valley, Basic is also rivals with Foothill High School, against whom they play each year in the "Battle for Boulder Highway," as each school sits on either side of the major road that divides old Henderson.

The school received IB accreditation for the Middle Years Programme in 2016 and the Diploma Programme in 2017.

A large, white letter "B" representing the school sits on the side of River Mountain peak from which a large part of southeastern Las Vegas Valley can see it. The original "B" was painted on the side of a mountain near the Lyal Burkholder Middle School near the Water Street District, which was also maintained for many years, long after Basic relocated to its current campus.

== Academics ==
Basic is an International Baccalaureate (IB) World School offering the IB Middle Years Program for freshmen and sophomores (9–10th grade) and both the IB Diploma Program and IB Career-related Programme for juniors and seniors (11–12th grade). The IB Career-related pathways include automotive technology, early childhood development, entrepreneurship, fashion design, forensic science, teaching and training, and video production. Students in these programs take specialized courses in their field alongside their IB core classes. While all underclassmen classes are part of the Middle Years Programme, students are not required to participate in the IB Diploma or IB Career programs as upperclassmen.

As a comprehensive school, Basic's course catalog includes all core subjects, English, mathematics through calculus, sciences, social studies) as well as world languages (Spanish and Chinese), fine arts, technology, and physical education. All students, regardless of magnet program enrollment, must fulfill the credit requirements set by CCSD and the Nevada Department of Education. The school also offers dual-enrollment courses for college credit through the College of Southern Nevada.

== Activities and clubs ==
=== Activities ===
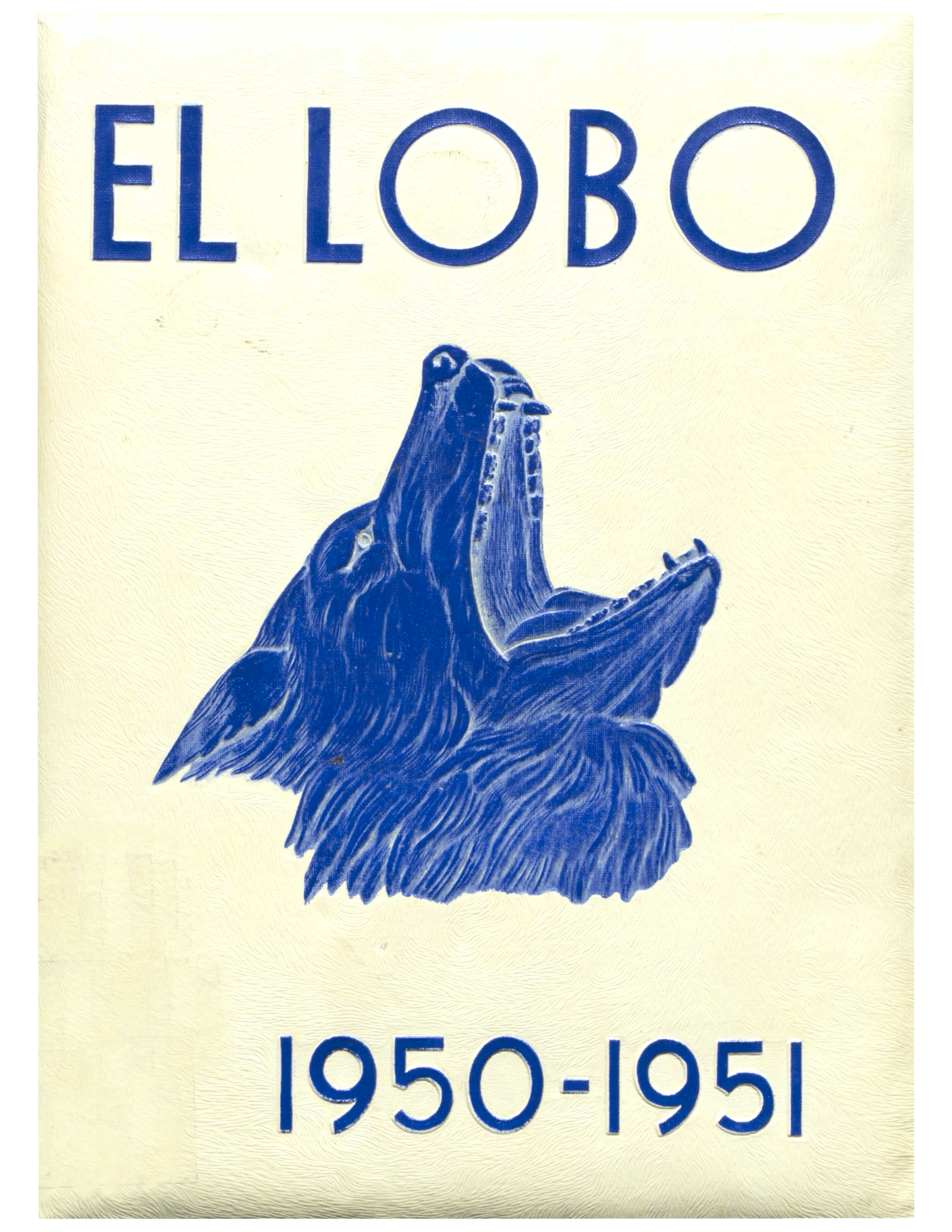
The cover of the 1951 El Lobo yearbook.

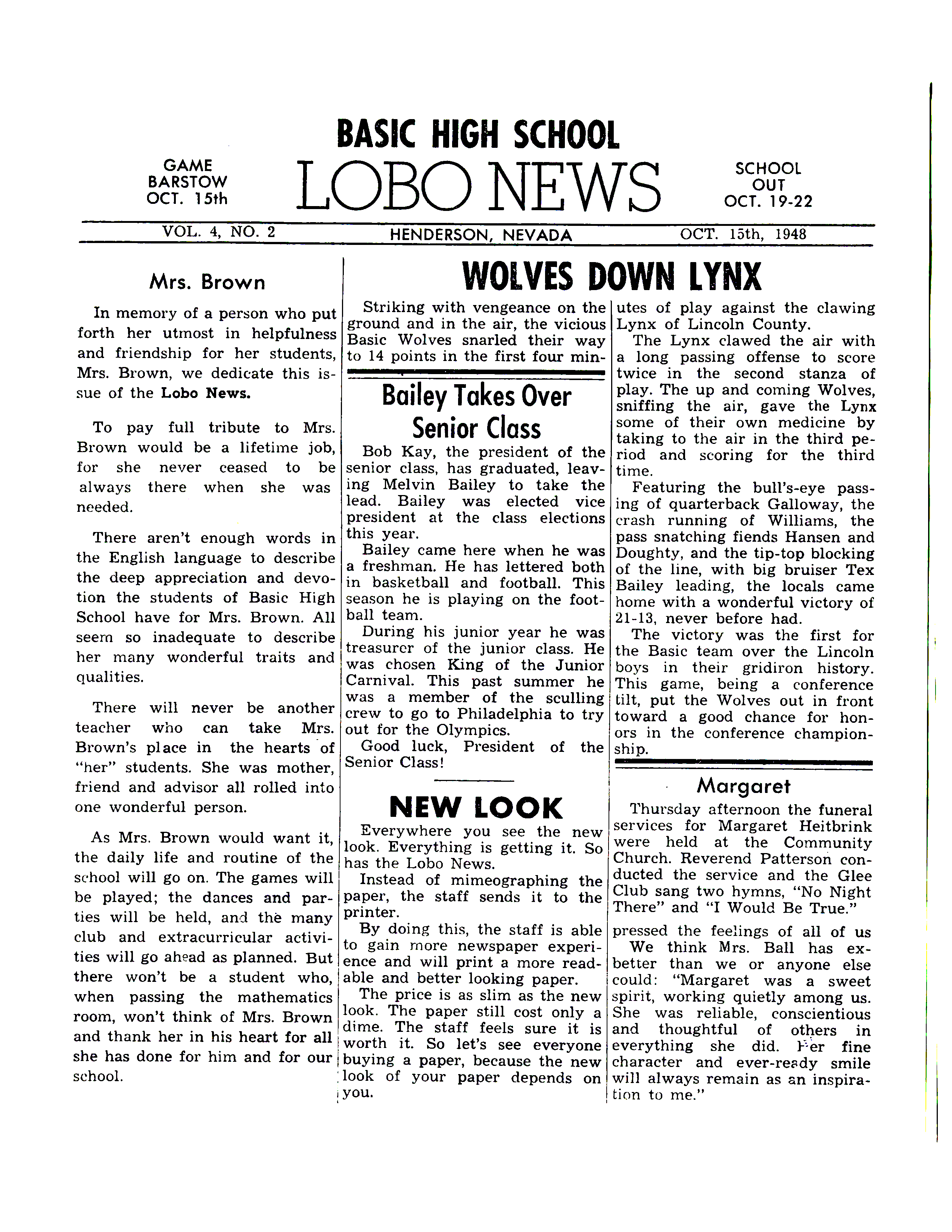
The front page of the Lone Wolf newspaper from 1948.

Basic has a number of award-winning activities classes including student council, yearbook, journalism, and Marine Corps JROTC. Each program is supervised by a faculty member and counts as an elective class while the daily operations of each are carried out by student leadership.

The school's Lone Wolf is the oldest continuously printed newspaper in Henderson. In the regional annual high school journalism contest, the Las Vegas Review-Journal awarded the Lone Wolf best newspaper in the reduced format category in 2009. In 2023, it won second place for best high school newspaper. Recognized by the Columbia Scholastic Press Association, the school's El Lobo yearbook won the organization's Crown Award five times, in 1991, 1992, 1994, 1995, and 2005. It has also won the National Pacemaker Award for yearbooks in 1998 and 2000.

The Marine Corps JROTC program was led by SgtMaj Bradley Kasal until his retirement in 2025 and currently by LtCol Bradley Van Slyke. won the championship 16 out of 18 times between 1996–2014 at the Bear West Coast National Drill meet and 16 of the prior 18 years.

=== Clubs ===
The school hosts several academic and community-service clubs including Model United Nations, robotics, speech and debate, chess, FCCLA, DECA, Key Club, Success Street (community service), National Honor Society, Best Buddies, and IB student council.

Clubs centered on identity or religion include the Fellowship of Christian Athletes, Bible Club, Empower Her, Native American Club, 9th Island Polynesian Club, Black Student Union, Gay-Straight Alliance, Filipino Club.

Numerous other clubs focus on a variety of activities or interests, including Dungeons and Dragons, cinema, photography, creative writing, theater, true crime, crochet, and anime.

== Athletics ==
Basic Academy NIAA State Championships
Sport	Division	Years
Baseball	5A Mountain	Won: 1955, 1956, 1982, 1987, 2016, 2017, 2022, 2025 Appearances:1955, 1956, 1958, 1962, 1982, 1987, 2001, 2002, 2016, 2017, 2018, 2019, 2022
Basketball (B)	4A Mountain	Won: 1947, 1956, 1959 Appearances: 2022, 2023
Basketball (G)	4A Desert	Appearances: 1995, 1997, 1999, 2006, 2023
Cross country (B)		Team: 1998, 1996, 1992, 1988, 1987 Individual: 1988/1987 Pat Hubbard Appearances: 2016 (6th), 2015 (5th), 2014 (6th), 2004 (6th), 2003 (4th), 2002(7th), 2001 (8th), 2000 (7th), 1999 (2nd), 1998 (W), 1997 (2nd), 1996 (W)
Cross Country (G)		Individual: 1998 Cindy Craig Team appearances: 2017 (eighth), 2002 (ninth), 2001 (ninth), 1999 (seventh), 1998 (third), 1997, 1996
Football	5A S./Lake	State won: 1960, 1958 League won: 2015, 2008, 2000
Golf (B)	5A Southeast	Team: 1986, 1979
Volleyball (B)		Won: 1998, 2002, 2024, 2025 Appearances: 2000, 2001, 2002, 2022, 2023, 2024, 2025
Volleyball (G)		Won: 1981, 1980, 1977, 1976 Appearances: 2022, 2021, 1985
Softball	4A Sky	Won: 2024, 2025 Appearances: 2018, 2019, 2024, 2025
Swimming		Individual: 2000, Riva Davidson (50 freestyle); 1998, Julie Whitehead (1m diving)
Tennis (B)	Sunrise League	Appearances: 2004 Playoff appearances: 2017, 2015, 2014, 2013, 2012, 2007, 2006, 2005, 2004, 2003, 2001
Tennis (G)	Sunrise League	Recent playoff appearances: 2017, 2014, 2012, 2008, 2004, 2003, 2001, 2000
Wrestling (B)		Team: 1984, 1979, 1976 Individual: 1998, Kevin Lochner (171); 2002, Duane Gonzales (103); 2025,Jaxon Mackey (150)
Notes: (B): boys sports, (G): girls sports. For wrestling, the weight class is indicated for the wrestler who won first place.

== Notable alumni ==
- Ryne Nelson – professional baseball pitcher for the Arizona Diamondbacks
- Glen and Les Charles – television writers and producers, notably of Taxi and Cheers
- Chris Latham – former MLB player
- Harry Reid – former United States Senator and Senate Majority Leader
- Henry Rolling – former NFL player.
- Don Smerek – former NFL player
- Karl Diether – David and Verla Sorensen Professor, Marriott School of Management at Brigham Young University

== Feeder schools ==
=== Elementary ===
- Robert L Taylor Elementary School
- Sister Robert Joseph Bailey Elementary School
- C. T. Sewell Elementary School
- John Dooley Elementary School
- Edna F. Hinman Elementary School
- Sue H. Morrow Elementary School
- Josh Stevens Elementary School
- Jim Thorpe Elementary School
- Harriet Treem Elementary School

=== Middle and junior high ===
- B. Mahlon Brown Junior High School
- Francis H. Cortney Junior High School

== Controversies ==
In April 2024, the Nevada Interscholastic Activities Association stripped Basic's baseball team of all league wins for using ineligible players, eliminating it from playoff contention. Head coach Scott Baker was dismissed the same day. In 2025, parents of a former player accused Baker of bullying and defamation; a claim was partly substantiated by then-principal Gerald Bustamante, though Baker denied wrongdoing. The district said the eligibility probe began with an anonymous tip, prompting a review of school and district actions.

In December 2008, 32-year-old choir teacher Matthew Cox was killed by one of his students and his brother. According to the investigation done by the Henderson Police Department, Jose Delatorre and Juan Aguirre strangled Cox after he gave them a ride home, then stole electronics and his vehicle. In 2012, both pleaded guilty to second-degree murder, robbery, and conspiracy. Delatorre was sentenced to 18 years to life, and Aguirre to 13 to 25 years in prison.

On September 4th, 2025, 30-year-old band teacher Cole Horton was arrested by CCSD police after an anonymous tip in August alleged that Horton was in a relationship with a student. According to police, the victim was a student from the 2024-2025 school year. Detectives reviewed the phone of the student and uncovered nearly 20,000 shared messages. The messages suggested that Horton and the student engaged in a sexual act prior to the students' graduation. Horton was booked into the Clark County Detention Center with a $15,000 bail. Horton had been an employee of CCSD since November 2019 and was placed on paid leave following his arrest.

== See also ==
- List of high schools in Nevada
- Clark County School District
- International Baccalaureate
