= Fernley High School =

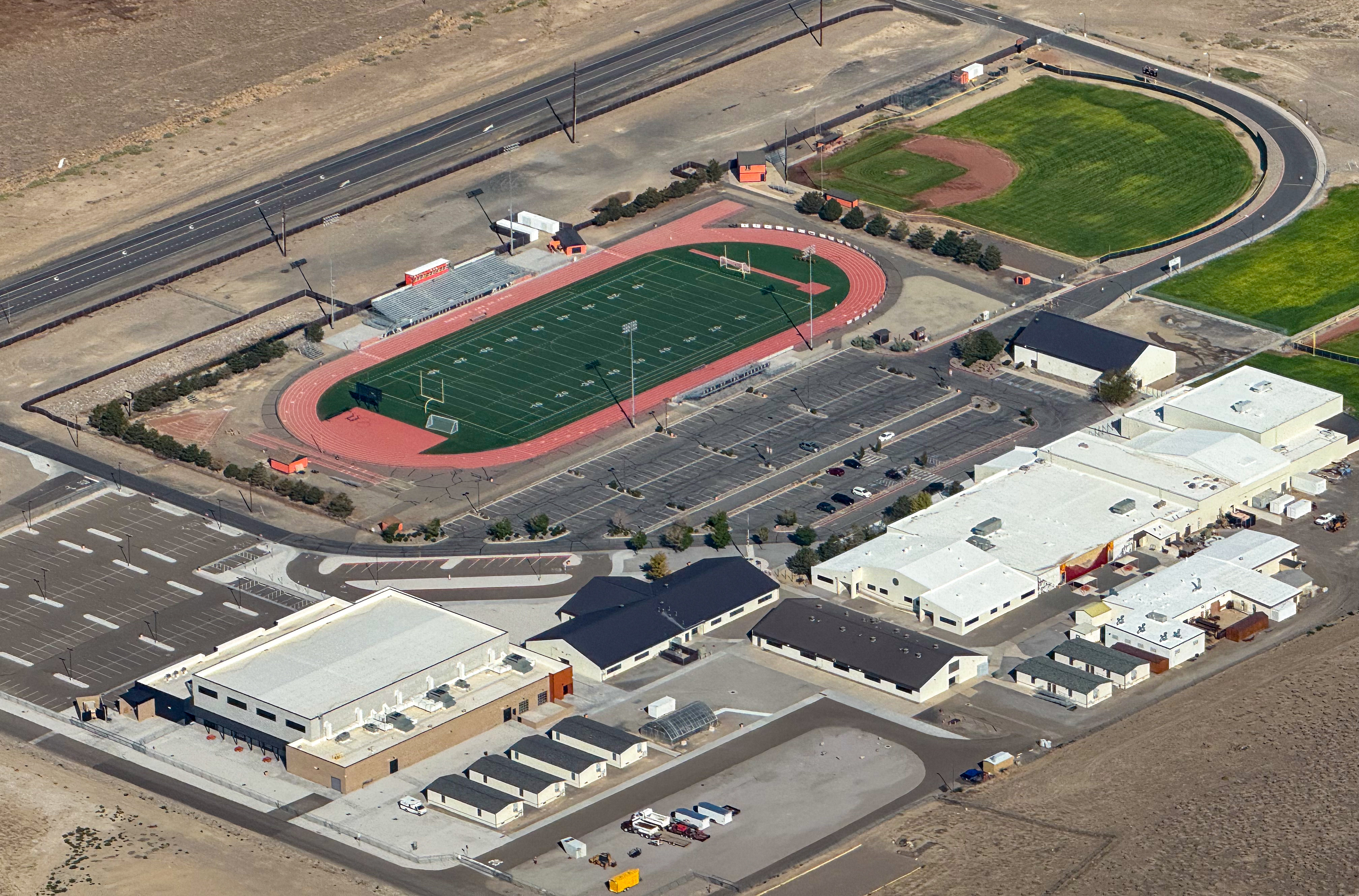
- Aerial photo of high school

Location
- 1300 Hwy 95A South; Fernley, Nevada 89408; United States
- Coordinates: 39.5818°N 119.2429°W

Information
- School type: Public, High School
- School district: Lyon County School District
- NCES School ID: 320030000176
- Principal: Ryan Cross
- Teaching staff: 55.00 (on an FTE basis)
- Grades: 9–12
- Enrollment: 1,327 (2024-2025)
- Student to teacher ratio: 24.13
- Colors: Orange; Black; White
- Mascot: Vaqueros
- Website: www.fhs.lyoncsd.org

Fernley High School (also known as FHS or Fernley School) is a coeducational, secondary school located in Fernley, Nevada, United States, eastside of the Reno metropolitan area. It is the largest school in the Lyon County School District. The school participates in an advanced placement program with Western Nevada College. As of 2015, it was the highest performing school in this joint enrollment program, known as "Jump Start." The student population as of the 2018–2019 school year was 1,096, and the school has drawn hundreds of international students since 1990s.

== History ==
Fernley School was founded in 1928. It was originally located on the historic site now occupied by the In-Town Park near the old downtown area between US 95A and Center Street. The old buildings were demolished in the early 1960s. Prior to 1980, the high school was located at what is now the Fernley Intermediate School on Hardie Lane. The current modern campus is located off US 95A on the south side of town, near the former home of Amazon.com which has relocated within Greater Reno.

== Facilities ==
Fernley High School has athletic programs and student clubs. It includes the Fernley Adult Education Center and has a partnership program with Upward Bound.

Since the late 1970s, the new campus of Fernley High School has built a wide range of academic facilities, library, laboratories, centers for architecture, engineering, computer/information systems & vocational, as well as considerable number of sport facilities & programs, including football stadium, baseball field, track and field (athletics), indoor basketball arena, gymnasium, fitness center, swimming, winter sports and golf programs, etc. It has a student meal program, dining hall and catering facilities. It is currently dealing with overcrowding, rapid growth, and improving campus facilities.

== Notable people ==
Alumni & people affiliated with Fernley School include:

- Cameron McVicar Batjer, Nevada Supreme Court, Associate Justice, football & basketball coach
- Ivan Lin, Microsoft executive, Hollywood executive producer
- Tyler Roemer, NCAA football athlete, San Diego State Aztecs offensive lineman
