= Lyon County School District =

School district in Nevada, United States

Location
- Lyon County, Nevada; United States

District information
- NCES District ID: 3200300

Students and staff
- Enrollment: 8,817 (2020-2021)
- Staff: 500.00 (on an FTE basis)
- Student–teacher ratio: 17.63

Other information
- Website: www.lyoncsd.org

Lyon County School District serves Lyon County, Nevada. The school district has 18 schools.

== Schools ==
=== Elementary schools ===
- Cottonwood Elementary School
- Dayton Elementary School
- East Valley Elementary School
- Fernley Elementary School
- Riverview Elementary School
- Silver Stage Elementary School
- Sutro Elementary School
- Yerington Elementary School

=== Middle schools ===
- Dayton Intermediate School
- Fernley Intermediate School
- Silverland Middle School
- Silver Stage Middle School
- Yerington Intermediate School

=== High schools ===
- Dayton High School
- Fernley High School
- Silver Stage High School
- Smith Valley Schools
- Yerington High School
