= Northwest Career and Technical Academy =

Location
- 8200 West Tropical Parkway; Las Vegas, Nevada 89149; 36.272138°N 115.273814°W

Information
- Type: Magnet school
- Established: 2007
- Principal: Laura Willis
- Teaching staff: 82.00 (FTE)
- Enrollment: 1,883 (2023–2024)
- Student to teacher ratio: 22.96
- Mascot: Hawk
- Information: 702-799-4640
- Website: www.nwctahawks.net

Northwest Career and Technical Academy, or NWCTA, is a nine-month magnet school in Las Vegas, Nevada in the Clark County School District (CCSD). The school first opened for the 2007-2008 school year, admitting only freshman and sophomores. Each year, another grade was added to accommodate the influx of students until all four grades were implemented in the 2009-2010 school year. Currently, the school holds a five star rating with the district.

== Mission statement ==
"The mission of the Northwest Career and Technical Academy is to boldly educate today's learners for tomorrow's challenges by developing advanced skills through unique hands-on experiences in a professional setting, utilizing community partnerships, innovative ideas, and contemporary technologies."

== Program areas ==
NWCTA offers eight program areas:

Engineering & Design

Mechanical Technology

Construction Technology

Culinary Arts

Hospitality & Marketing

Teacher Education

Veterinary Science

Biomedical Science

Each program area is dedicated a section of the school, including each having an assigned glass-walled "project room". The programs also have access to unique facilities, such as a garage for Mechanical Technology, a workshop for Construction Management, a kitchen for the Culinary Arts, along with a kindergarten for Teacher Education students. The new building received the international annual design award of the Council of Educational Facilities Planners International for 2008, the James D. MacConnell Award for outstanding new educational facilities.

== Academics and Atmosphere ==
NWCTA was named a Magnet School of Distinction by the Magnet Schools of America in 2010 and 2011. The school's population is over 1900 and has a student/teacher ratio of 28/1.

== Notable alumni ==
- Tyler Dale, co-star on the History Channel's American Restoration
