= Durango High School (Nevada) =

Public school in Las Vegas, Nevada, US

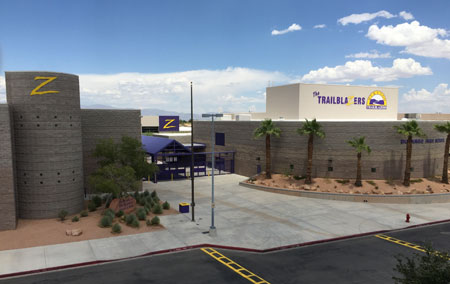

Location
- 7100 W Dewey Dr; Las Vegas, Nevada; United States; 36.08872°N 115.24674°W

Information
- Type: Public
- Motto: Dedication, Hardwork, Success
- Established: 1993; 33 years ago
- Principal: Mi-Jung Park (since 2025)
- Staff: 98.00 (FTE)
- Grades: 9-12
- Enrollment: 2,358 (2023-24)
- Student to teacher ratio: 24.58
- Campus type: Suburban
- Colors: Purple and gold
- Mascot: Trailblazers
- Rivals: Spring Valley HS, Bonanza HS, Sierra Vista HS, Clark HS, Palo Verde HS
- Website: www.durangohighschool.net

Durango High School is a public high school in Spring Valley, Nevada, USA, with an enrollment of approximately 2600 students. It is a part of the Area 4 region of the Clark County School District, which is the fifth largest school district in the United States. Durango High School's main sports rivals are Bishop Gorman High School and Spring Valley High School.

== Overview ==
Between 1993 and 2005, students were required to follow a daily schedule of 6 periods. Beginning in the 2006-07 school year, Durango switched to a block schedule, which consisted of 8 classes with 1, 3, 5 and 7 meeting on an "A" day and 2, 4, 6 and 8 meeting on a "B" day. From the 2009-10 school year, all schools in Clark County have switched back to the former 6 period schedule. This did not include seniors, who only have 4 classes.

In the 2000-2001 school year, Durango had the largest number of students in its history with some 3,647 students. The number of openings of other schools and rezonings to alternative schools removed the strain and high student enrollment. By the 2005-2006 school year, Durango enrolled 2,243 students.

Annually, the school broadcast an episode of Z-Man & Z-Boy on Durango High's television station, ZTV.

== Athletics ==
Durango High School's sports teams are known as the Trailblazers and compete in the Southwest Division of the Sunset 4A Region. The main rival is Spring Valley High School.

=== Nevada Interscholastic Activities Association State Championships ===
- Baseball - 1999,2024,2025
- Basketball (boys) - 1995, 1996, 2023
- Cross Country (boys) - 1994
- Track and field (boys) - 1999
- Volleyball (boys) - 1999, 2000
- Volleyball (girls) - 1997, 2002, 2003, 2023
- Golf (boys) - 2000
- Golf (women's) - 2000, 2001

== Performing Arts ==
=== Theatre ===
In April 2017, the Durango High School Theatre Department became the first theatre company to perform,"Not Yet,Pista", by Stephen Nasser. The autobiographical play featured author, Stephen Nasser, a Holocaust survivor, along with the cast of Durango Theatre students. The World Premiere of "Not Yet, Pista" was performed from April 22–24, 2017, under the direction of former department head, Tobias Torres.

== Notable alumni ==
- Kurt Busch, retired stock car driver, 2004 NASCAR Nextel Cup Series champion, and 2017 Daytona 500 winner.
- Kyle Busch (1985-2026), stock car driver, 2009 NASCAR Nationwide Series, 2015 NASCAR Sprint Cup Series, and 2019 Monster Energy NASCAR Cup Series champion. All-time win leader in the NASCAR Xfinity Series and NASCAR Camping World Truck Series.
- David M. Gardner, Nevada State Assemblyman
- Rebekah Kochan, actress
- T.J. Lavin, BMX rider and television personality
- Ryan Ludwick, former professional baseball player
- Jesse Magdaleno, professional boxer
- Jack Murphy, Head Men's Basketball Coach at Northern Arizona University
- Tommy Pham, baseball player, currently with the New York Mets
- Cerina Vincent, Actress
- Keshon Gilbert, professional basketball player
