= Moapa Valley High School =

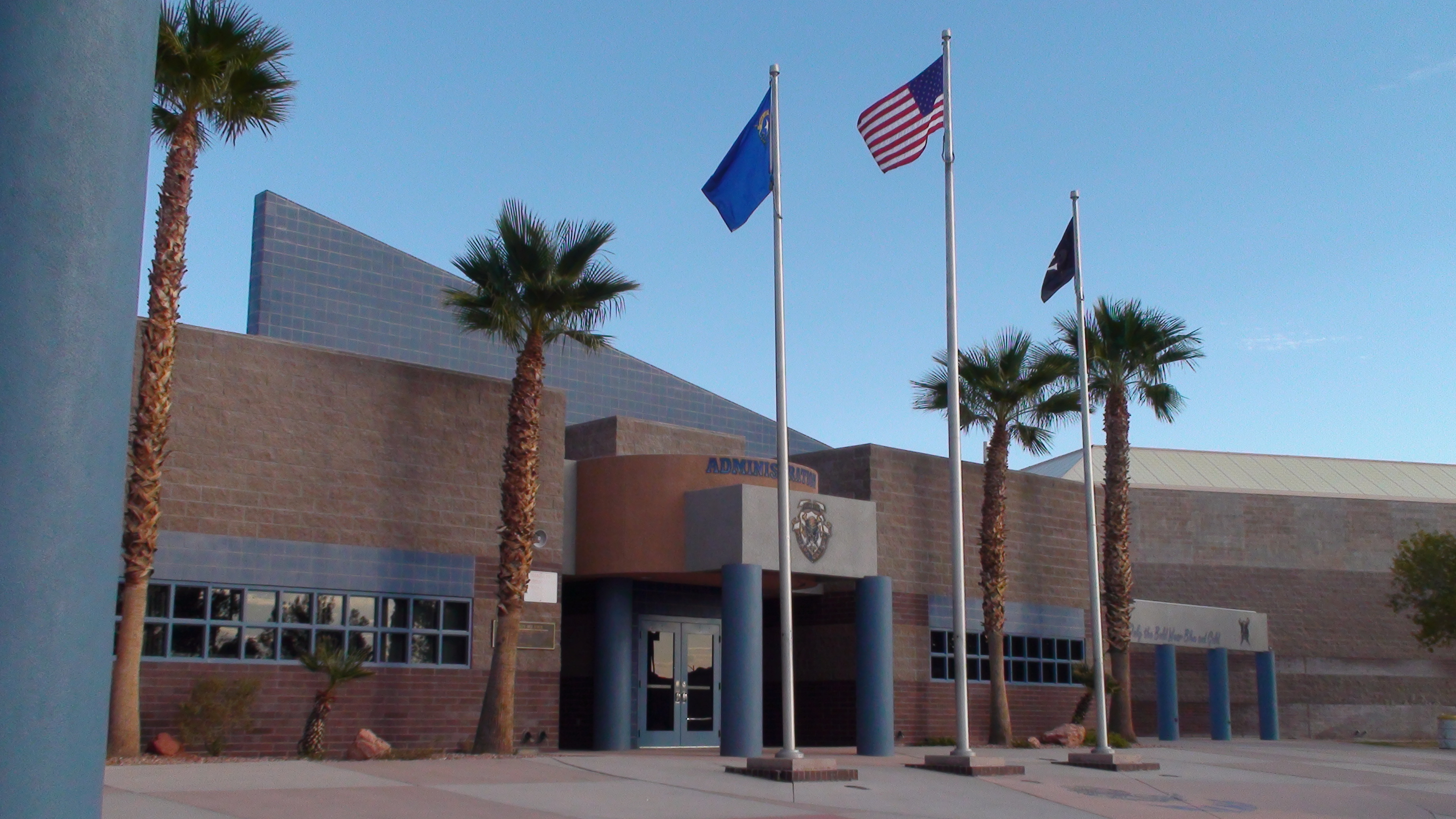

Location
- 2400 St. Joseph Street; Overton, Nevada 89040; United States; 36.58513333°N 114.4583139°W

Information
- Type: Public high school
- Motto: Specializing in futures.
- Established: Original campus: 1914; New campus: 1993
- School district: Clark County School District
- Principal: Duane McMinn
- Teaching staff: 30.00 (FTE)
- Grades: 9-12
- Enrollment: 568 (2024-2025)
- Student to teacher ratio: 18.93
- Colours: Blue and Gold
- Athletics conference: Moapa Valley 3A South Region
- Team name: Pirates
- Website: www.moapavalleyhs.com

Moapa Valley High School is a 3A public high school in Overton, Nevada, United States and is part of the Clark County School District (CCSD). It has an approximated number of students of 562. The school mascot is the pirate.

== History ==
In the year 1914 Moapa Valley High School opened. This school housed grades kindergarten through 12. The original building was a gothic style two-story masonry building. Moapa Valley's first graduating class graduated in 1919 and consisted of two students. The first principal was Mr Liljenquist. As the town grew a second building was added in 1922, this included a 250-seat auditorium and a gymnasium. In the 1930s the federal government helped build a second gym, the old gym was then converted into a library. In 1956 Moapa Valley High School became a part of the Clark County School District. More information concerning the school and the valley can be found in the books 100 Years on the Muddy, or Grant M. Bowler: The Man and His Time.

== Notable alumni ==
- Jordan Adams (class of 1999), basketball player and coach
- Andy Stokes (class of 1999), football player
- Josh Thompson (class of 2011), track and field athlete

== See also ==
- Moapa Valley, Nevada
- List of high schools in Nevada
