= Oasis Academy (Nevada) =

Charter school in Fallon, Nevada

Coordinates: 39.4771°N 118.7884°W

Oasis Academy Charter School is a charter school in Fallon, Nevada. It covers grades K-12.

It was established in 2011. By 2015, the school had up to grade 10, with a student count of 500. In 2017 its enrollment was 160.

By 2022, it was located in a more than 100,000-square-foot (9,300 m^{2}) former Walmart. Old Fallon LLC was the previous owner of the facility. The school purchased the facility on April 25 of that year.

== High School ==
In the summer of 2024, the school opened a high school, just north of the original building. There are currently 4 core classes, consisting of English, Math, History, and Science. This building served as a new host for High School Students replacing the college campus they once shared their classes with.

== Athletics ==
In 2017, the school hosted athletic events at county and municipal athletic facilities, as the school itself did not have such facilities.

== See also ==
- Churchill County School District - The local school district
- Churchill County High School - The district's high school
