= Pershing County School District =

School in Nevada, US

Location
- Lovelock, Nevada (HQ) US-NV United States

District information
- Type: Public
- Grades: PK-12
- Schools: 4
- Budget: $11,890,000
- NCES District ID: 3200420

Students and staff
- Students: 677
- Teachers: 52
- Student–teacher ratio: 13.02

Other information
- Website: www.pcsdnv.com

Pershing County School District provides public education for all grades in Pershing County, Nevada. The headquarters of the district are in Lovelock, the county seat. The school district has only four schools.

== PCSD Schools ==
- Imlay Elementary
- Lovelock Elementary
- Pershing County High School
- Pershing County Middle School
