= Spring Valley High School (Nevada) =

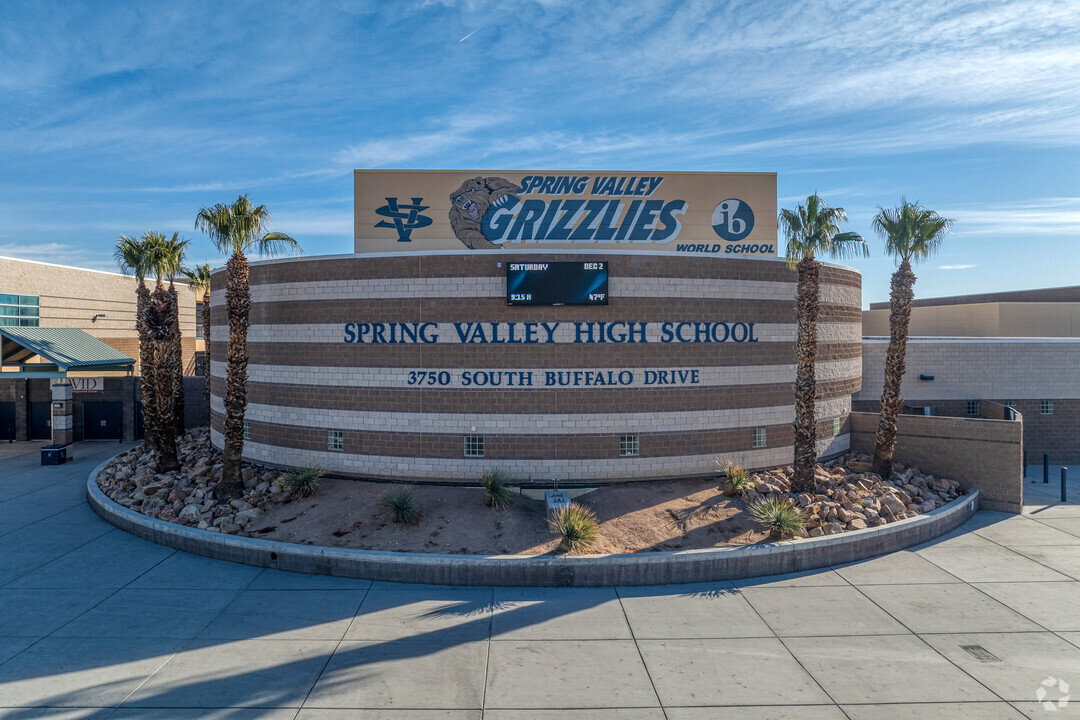

Location
- 3750 Buffalo Drive, Las Vegas, NV 89147; 36.12046°N 115.25921°W

Information
- School type: Public high school
- Motto: "Success with Honor and Spirit"
- Established: 2004
- School district: Clark County School District
- Principal: Tara Powell
- Teaching staff: 108.00 (FTE)
- Grades: 9–12
- Enrollment: 2,677 (2023-2024)
- Student to teacher ratio: 24.79
- Colors: Navy White Gold
- Team name: Grizzlies
- Publication: The Grizzly Growler
- Website: springvalleyhs.com

Spring Valley High School is located in the Spring Valley community in unincorporated Clark County, Nevada, United States. The school, serving grades 9 through 12, is a part of the Clark County School District. The school's mascot is a grizzly bear. The school's curriculum offers 8 Career/Technical Education Programs and an International Baccalaureate Diploma. Their sports rivals are Durango High School, Sierra Vista High School, and Bonanza High School. The principal/IB Head of School, Tara Powell, was appointed in June 2021.

== International Baccalaureate ==
Spring Valley High School offers IB as a magnet program. It is an authorized International Baccalaureate Middle Year and Diploma Program World School. It also offers the IB Career Path program. The Middle Years program is wall to wall in the 9th and 10th grade. The inaugural class of IB DP graduated in May 2020. Approximately 50% of the candidates earned the IB diploma that year.

== AVID ==
Spring Valley HS is an AVID (Advancement Via Individual Determination) National Demonstration School. Spring Valley has the largest AVID program in Nevada and is the only Demonstration school in the state. Spring Valley opened with its first group of AVID students who graduated in 2008. AVID is an elective college prep program which helps students prepare for college and life. AVID's mission is to close the opportunity gap by preparing all students for college readiness and success in a global society.

== Athletics ==
=== 4a regional qualifiers ===
- Boys Wrestling - 2024

=== Nevada Interscholastic Activities Association State Championships ===
- Girls Basketball - 2014
- Softball - 2016
- Bowling - 2018, 2019

== Notable alumni ==
- Tyler Anderson, baseball player, Los Angeles Dodgers
- Gary Payton II, basketball player, Golden State Warriors
- Aaron Blair, baseball player, Atlanta Braves
- Chris Eubank Jr, World Champion Middleweight Boxer, IBO, WBA Interim Title

== Feeder Schools ==
- Clifford J. Lawrence Junior High School
- Victoria Fertitta Middle School
- Walter Johnson Junior High School
- Kenny C. Guinn Middle School
- Grant Sawyer Middle school
