= Eagle Peak =

Eagle Peak is the name of 44 mountain peaks of the United States including:

- Eagle Peak (Alaska)
- Eagle Peak (Admiralty Island), in Alaska
- Eagle Peak (Washington), a summit in Mount Rainier National Park
- Eagle Peak (Mariposa County, California), a rock formation in Yosemite National Park
- Eagle Peak (Modoc County, California), part of the Warner Mountains
- Eagle Peak (Mono County, California), a mountain in the Sierra Nevada
- Eagle Peak (San Bernardino County, California), tallest in the Sacramento Mountains, California
- Eagle Peak (San Diego County, California)
- Eagle Peak (New Mexico)
- Eagle Peak (Wyoming)
- Eagle Peak in Mineral County, Montana

Eagle Peak in Canada:

- Eagle Peak, in the Selkirk Mountains of British Columbia

== Eagle Peak Lookout ==
- Eagle Peak Fire Lookout
