= Chemehuevi Mountains =

Landform in southern California near the Colorado River

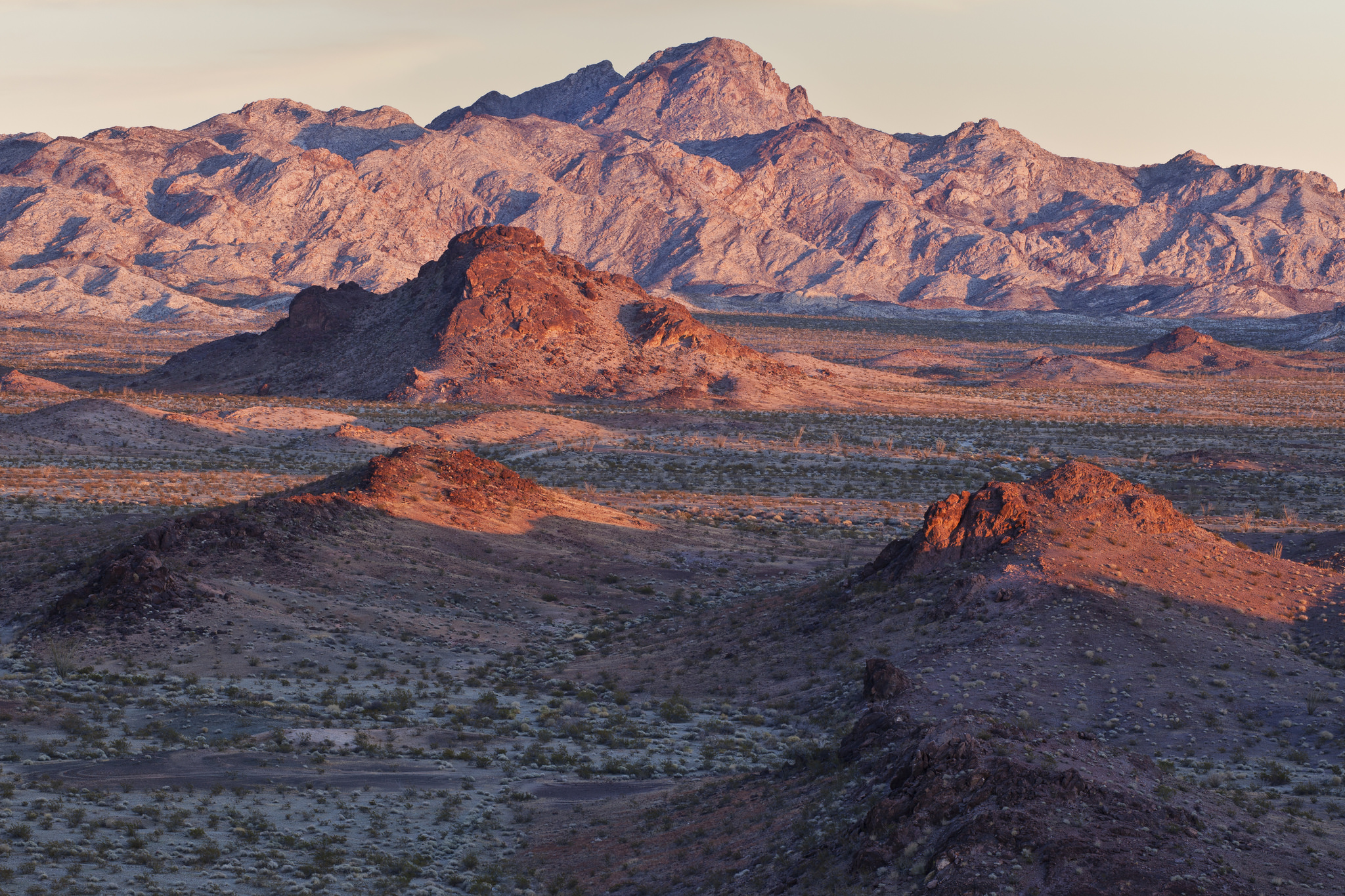
- Much of the Chemehuevi's showing Chemehuevi Peak and parts of the Chemehuevi Valley (view approx. north-northwest)

Highest point
- Peak: Chemehuevi Peak
- Elevation: 3,694 ft (1,126 m)

Geography
- Location within California Location within the United States
- Country: United States
- State: California
- Regions: Mojave Desert; Lower Colorado River Valley
- County: San Bernardino
- Settlements: Topock, Arizona; Needles, California; Lake Havasu City, Arizona
- Range coordinates: 34°37′30.031″N 114°31′32.863″W
- Borders on: Sacramento Mountains; Topock Marsh; Topock Gorge; Colorado River; Mohave Mountains; Chemehuevi Wash; Chemehuevi Valley; Whipple Mountains
- Topo map: USGS Chemehuevi Peak

The Chemehuevi Mountains are a mountain range that are found at the southeast border of San Bernardino County in southeastern California and are adjacent the Colorado River. Located south of Needles, California and northwest of the Whipple Mountains, the mountains are oriented in a north–south direction, and stretch for approximately 15 miles (24 km) in length.

== Geography ==
The Chemehuevi Mountains are located between U.S. Route 95 and the Topock Gorge of the River, just south of Interstate 40. Whale Mountain, at 2,774 feet (846 m), is found at the northern end of the range about five miles east of Lobecks Pass. The Chemehuevi range reaches 3,694 feet (1,126 m) at its highpoint, Chemehuevi Peak, located at the range's extreme southwest, bordering Chemehuevi Valley and Wash, where the valley turns due-east to meet the Colorado River.

== Chemehuevi Mountains Wilderness ==
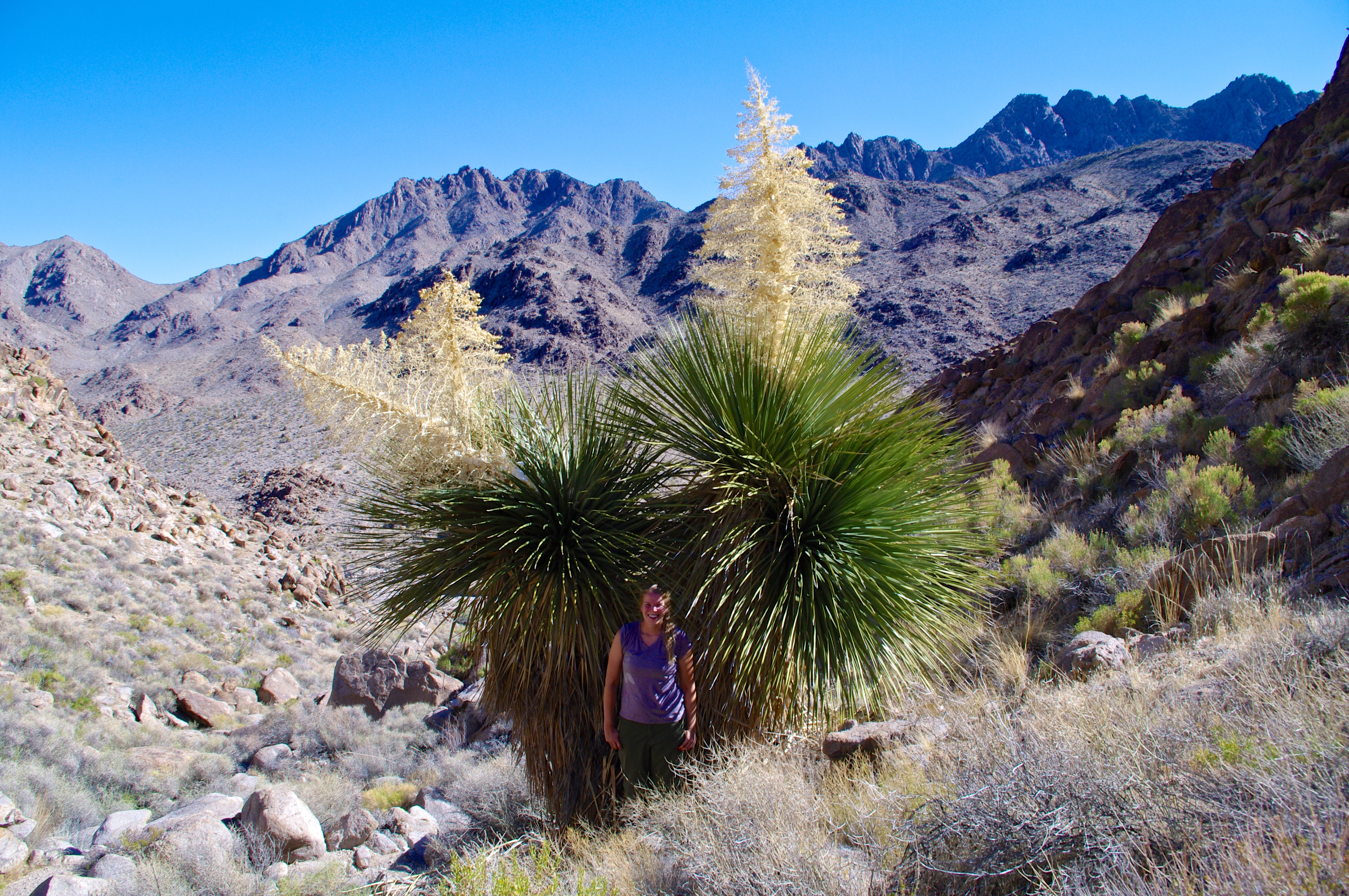
Canyon and peaks, in the range's southwest. (looking ~north) The large "shrub" is Nolina parryi, endemic to the Lower Colorado River Valley region, in higher, & mostly mountainous elevations. This wash region has produced that large specimen.

The Chemehuevi Mountains Wilderness Area encompasses the rugged, granitic Chemehuevi Mountains and surrounding environs. The mountain range is horseshoe-shaped, with the open end facing eastward, toward the Colorado River. Contained within the arms of the horseshoe is a large central valley with low rolling hills covered by dense stands of cholla and other cacti, ocotillo, and an occasional agave.

Viewed from the west, the strikingly light, almost white, color of the granite peaks contrast sharply with the rich green creosote and cactus-covered bajadas. A few miles from the Colorado River, the mountains change dramatically from light-colored granite to dark red and gray volcanic spires and mesas.

== See also ==
- Category:Mountain ranges of the Mojave Desert
- Category:Protected areas of the Mojave Desert
- Category:Flora of the California desert regions
