= Mohave Mountains =

Landform in Mohave County, Arizona

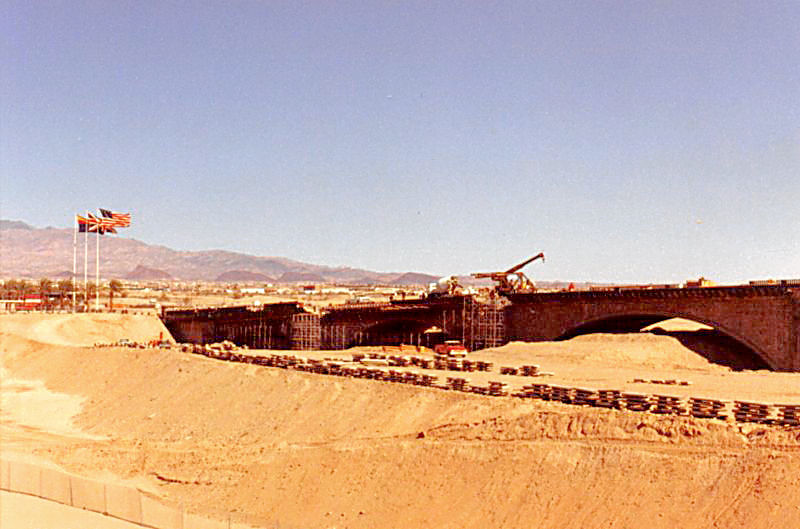
- View looking southwest from Lake Havasu City area — south portion of Mohave Mountains

Highest point
- Peak: Crossman Peak, center-south (see text)
- Elevation: 5,103 ft (1,555 m)

Dimensions
- Length: 18 mi (29 km) NW-SE
- Width: 6 mi (9.7 km)

Geography
- Location within Arizona
- Country: United States
- State: Arizona
- Regions: Mojave Desert and Sonoran Desert
- County: Mohave
- Communities: Lake Havasu City, Franconia and Lake Havasu Heights
- Range coordinates: 34°35′N 114°14′W
- Borders on: Colorado River, Lake Havasu, Sacramento Valley, Sacramento Wash, Dutch Flat and Bill Williams Mountains

The Mohave Mountains are a small 18-mi (29 km) long mountain range of northwest Arizona. The range is a northwest trending range in southwest Mohave County that parallels a southeast-flowing stretch of the Colorado River, the Arizona-California border. The range also forms the southwest border of a flatland region to its east and north, namely, Dutch Flat which lies east, at the south end of Sacramento Valley. Lake Havasu City, AZ on the Colorado, lays opposite the southwest flank of the range, where the London Bridge was reconstructed at Lake Havasu.

Interstate 40 traverses east from Needles, California adjacent the north of the range through the flatland region, and turns north through the Sacramento Valley to Kingman, Arizona.

The northwest terminus of the range merges into hills and a rocky region on the east shore of the Colorado River called The Needles. The Topock Gorge of the Colorado and The Needles lay at the east border of the Chemehuevi Mountains of California; both the Chemehuevi and Sacramento Mountains force the Colorado River to flow southeasterly.

== Range description ==
The Mohave Mountains are mostly northwest-trending with a slight curve to the east at the south terminus, into the southwest region of Dutch Flat. There is no central ridgeline; instead the northwest becomes lower elevation hills, bordering The Needles region. The center and south of the range is centered around a massif which contains the range highpoint, Crossman Peak, at 5,103 feet (1,555 m).

Since the elevation of Lake Havasu City is 602 feet (183 m), the height of the range from the surrounding countryside is 4000–4500 ft.

== Access ==
Arizona State Route 95 borders the Colorado River's east bank and allows access to the range. Unimproved roads from Arizona 95 access the northwest and the north of the range, where Lake Havasu Heights is located.

An unimproved road from Arizona 95 (Dutch Flat Rd) traverses northeasterly at the range's southeast flank. The route reaches Dutch Flat, from where the complete eastern side of the range is met with unimproved access roads. A dirt route from Franconia Wash, (northwest Dutch Flat, Franconia on I-40), accesses the northeast of Crossman Peak. Another unimproved road starts at the end of Bison Blvd in Lake Havasu City and follows Falls Springs Wash to a gate, where it continues up a very steep route to a radio antenna complex along the ridgeline, half a mile from Crossman Peak. The gated portion of the route is open to hikers, and the ridgeline offers views of Dutch Flat and the Lake Havasu valley.

The unimproved roads into Dutch Flat, the range's northwest flank, and also the range's north, can be accessed from Interstate 40. I-40 lies 7-mi due-north of the range's north terminus.

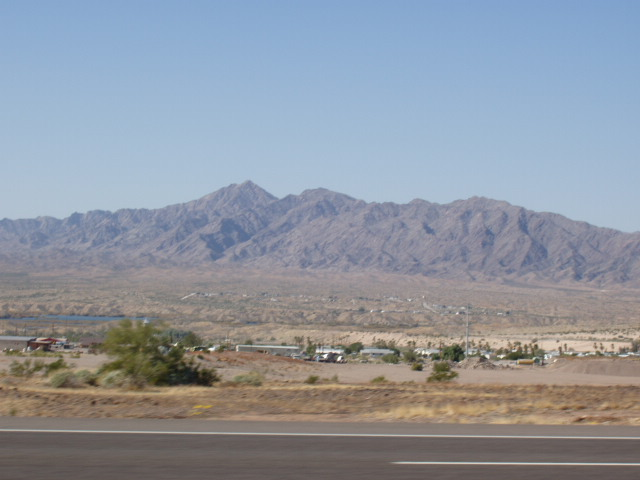
Crossman Peak, from Arizona 95

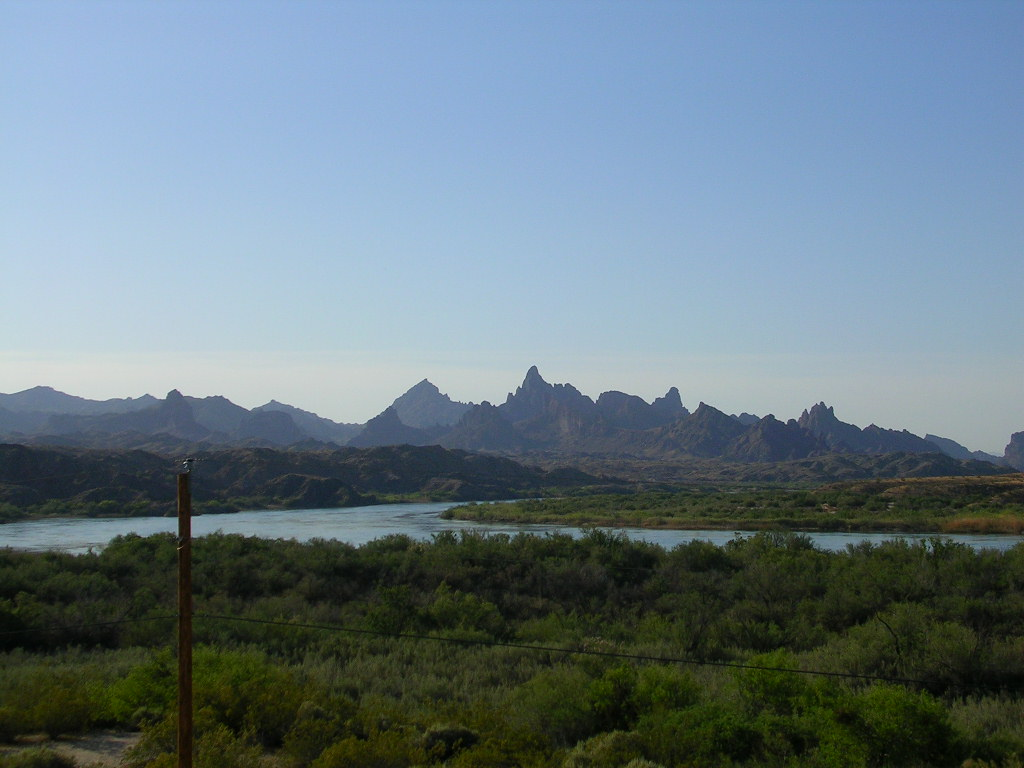
The Needles, at Topock Gorge
(view ~southeast on the Colorado)
