= Sacramento Mountains =

Sacramento Mountains may refer to:

- Sacramento Mountains (California)
- Sacramento Mountains (New Mexico)
