= List of Wildlife Refuges of the Lower Colorado River Valley =

The Lower Colorado River Valley (LCRV) has played an important role for the ecology of western Arizona and eastern California. In the past the river region was dominated by mining and agriculture and today by recreation, all of which will have an effect on he flora and forna. A series of Wildlife refuges have been set up to manage some areas for wildlife, and have been credited with protecting endangered spies from dispersing from the valley, including the Yuma Clapper Rail and Cottonwood Willow.

Such refuges in this region include:

- Bill Williams River National Wildlife Refuge
- Cibola National Wildlife Refuge
- Havasu National Wildlife Refuge
- Imperial National Wildlife Refuge
- Kofa National Wildlife Refuge

== See also ==
- List of National Wildlife Refuges
