= Lincoln County High School (Nevada) =

High school in southeast Nevada

- School campus

Location
- 1111 Edwards Street; Panaca, Nevada 89042; United States; 37.7930°N 114.3868°W

Information
- Type: Public high school
- Established: 1909; 117 years ago
- School district: Lincoln County School District
- Superintendent: Nykki Holton
- Principal: Marty Soderborg
- Teaching staff: 9.52 (FTE)
- Grades: 9-12
- Gender: Co-educational
- Enrollment: 160 (2023–2024)
- Student to teacher ratio: 16.81
- Colors: Red & White
- Athletics conference: Southern Nevada 2A Region
- Nickname: Lynx
- Website: www.lcsdnv.com/LincolnCountyHS.aspx

Lincoln County High School is located in the city of Panaca, Nevada and serves the northern part of Lincoln County, which is located in southeastern Nevada along the Utah border. It was established in 1909.

== Clubs ==
- FFA
- SkillsUSA

== Athletics ==
Lincoln County's athletic teams are nicknamed the Lynx.

Boys - Cross Country Team

coached by Lacy Pearson

Region Championships: 2022

Individual Region Champions: Benjamin Finlinson 2022

State Finishing:

Individual State Finishers (Top 6): Davin Avery 2nd (2022), Benjamin Finlinson 3rd (2022) Cameron Frehner 5th (2013)

History

2022: Second in 2A State meet, First in 2A Southern Region meet

2021: Fifth in 2A State meet, Third in 2A Southern Region meet

2019: Sixth in 2A State meet, Third in 2A Southern Region

2018: Fifth in 2A Southern Region meet

2017: Fifth in 2A Southern Region meet

2016: Fourth in 2A Southern Region meet

2015: Fourth in Division III Southern Region meet

2014: Third in Division III Southern Region meet

2013: Fifth in Division III state meet, second in Division III Southern Region meet

2012: Sixth in Division III state meet, second in Division III Southern Region meet

Individual Records & Standings:

https://www.athletic.net/CrossCountry/TeamRecords.aspx?SchoolID=2467

Wrestling Team

coached by Grant Perkins

Region Championships: 2022

State Championships:

Individual State Champions:

Girls - Cross Country Team

Nevada Interscholastic Activities Association State Championships

- Baseball - 1972, 1991, 1992, 1993, 1998, 2006
