= The Needles (Arizona) =

Rock formation in Mohave County, Arizona, US

Coordinates: 34.676°N 114.438°W

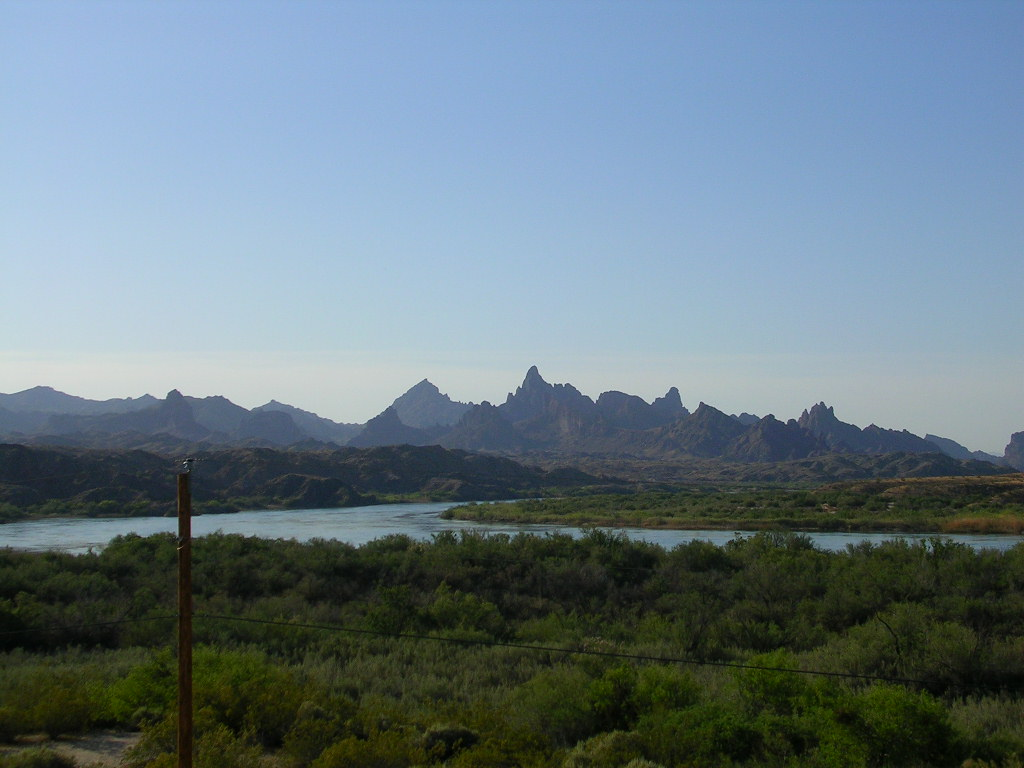
The Needles, at Topock Gorge from the northwest looking down the Colorado River, April 2006

The Needles are a distinctive group of rock pinnacles, mountain peaks adjacent to the Topock Gorge, and the Colorado River on the northwestern extreme of the Mojave Mountains within the Havasu National Wildlife Refuge in Mohave County, Arizona, United States. They range from 1,207 feet (368 m) to over 1,600 feet (490 m) in altitude.
