= Needles Unified School District =

School district in California

Address
- 1900 Erin Drive Needles, California, 92363; United States
- Coordinates: 34°50′19″N 114°37′11″W

District information
- Type: Public
- Motto: "Education First"
- Grades: K–12
- Superintendent: Dr. Garry Cameron
- NCES District ID: 0626760

Students and staff
- Students: 967 (2020–2021)
- Teachers: 46.75 (FTE)
- Staff: 53.01 (FTE)
- Student–teacher ratio: 20.68:1

Other information
- Attendance Area: 6000 square miles
- Website: www.needlesusd.org

Needles is part of San Bernardino County in California, but is on the borders of the states of Arizona and Nevada. Needles has been a regular stop for the Santa Fe railway since the 19th century. Route 66 also runs through the town. Schools in the Needles, California area are part of the Needles Unified School District, a public K – 12 school system. The school district is one of the largest in the United States in terms of area with almost 6,000 square miles (16,000 km^{2}) in its boundaries, the largest geographical school district in the contiguous United States. In distance, this is the farthest school district from the county education offices (212 miles by freeway).

Needles Unified School District is made up of 7 different site locations throughout the town of Needles as well as the outermost boundaries of the district. The district runs from Amboy, California to Needles, and south to Havasu Lake, Parker Dam, and Big River, California. It has 1,158 enrolled students.

== Schools ==
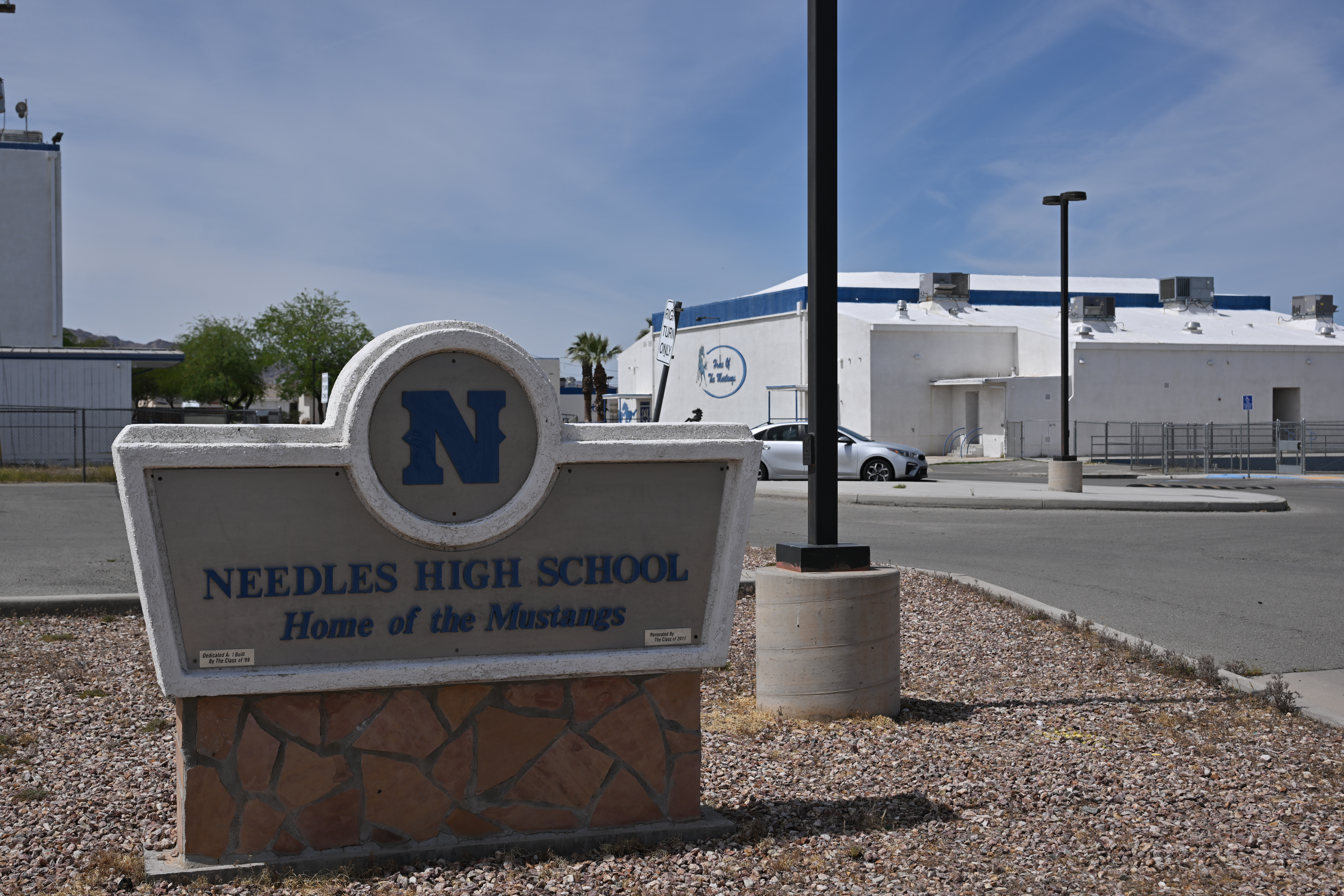
Needles High School Sign, Needles, CA

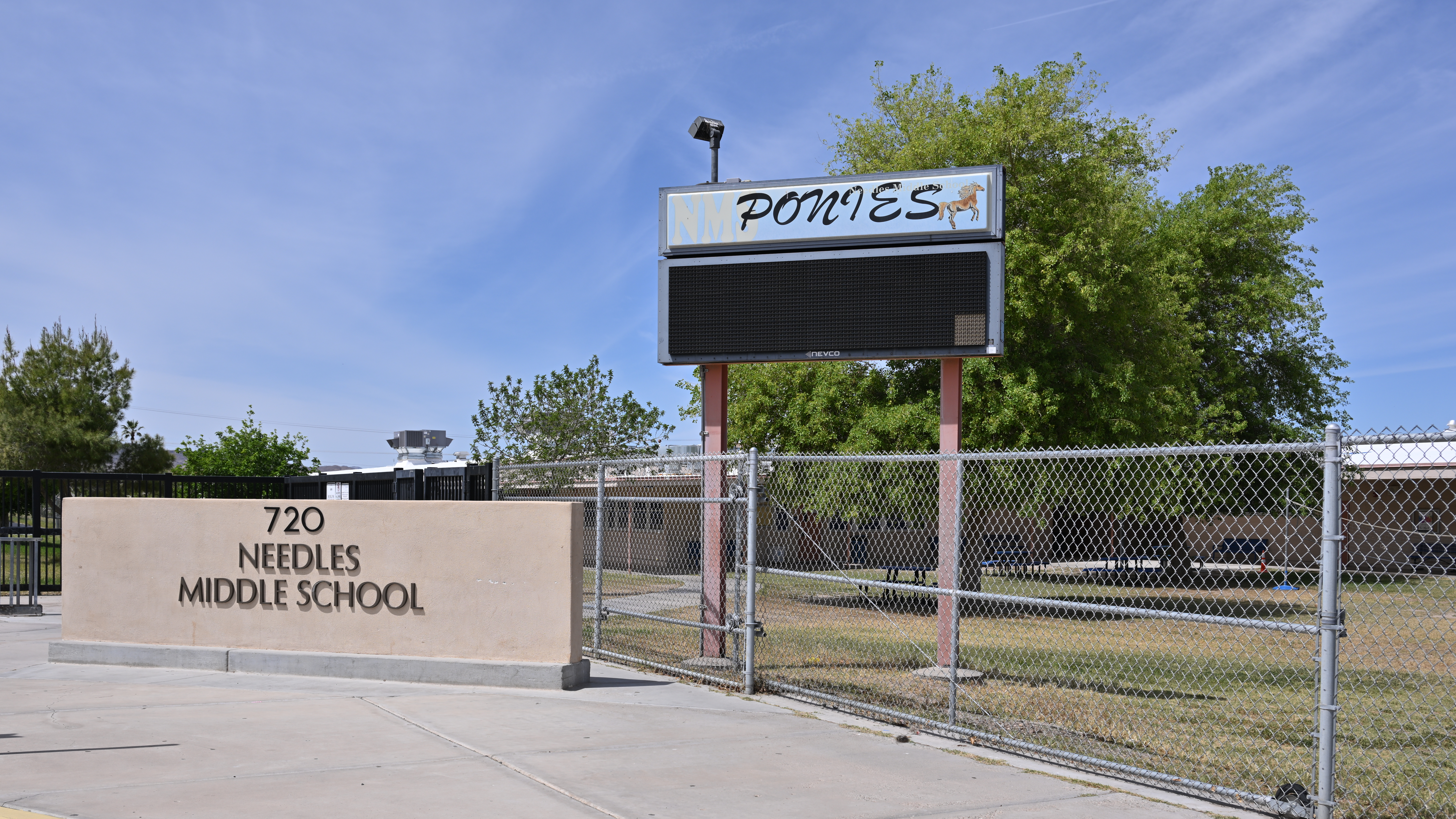
Needles Middle School sign, Needles, CA

=== Elementary ===
- Chemehuevi Valley Elementary School (Havasu Lake, California)
- Katie Hohstadt Elementary School (formerly D Street School)
- Parker Dam Elementary School (Parker Dam, California)(grades K–8)
- Vista Colorado Elementary School
- Monument Peak School (Big River)

=== Middle ===
- Needles Middle School

=== High ===
- Needles High School

=== Alternative ===
- Educational Training Center

==== Future ====
- Big River High School
