= Eagle Peak Lookout =

Fire lookout tower in New Mexico, USA

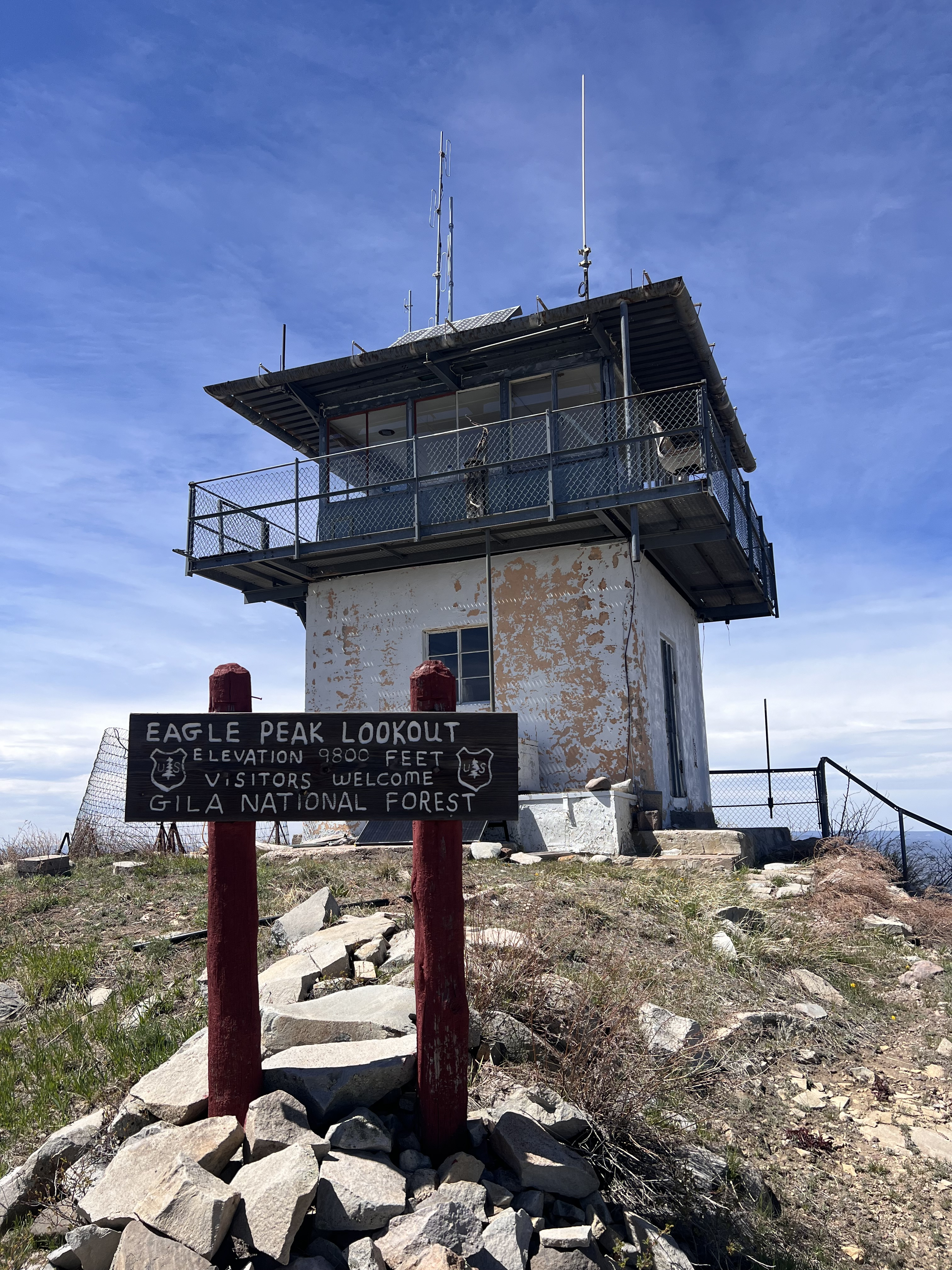
Exterior of Eagle Peak Lookout in May 2024.

Eagle Peak Lookout is an active US Forest Service fire lookout tower located in the Gila National Forest approximately 18 miles east of Reserve, New Mexico. On May 22, 2022, the Eagle Peak Lookout was added to the National Historic Lookout Register.

== History and construction ==
Eagle Peak Lookout is a US Forest Service Standard Plan CL-100 to CL-106 Series type lookout tower constructed in 1955. The tower consists of a 14'x14' (196 ft²) steel cab on top of a 10' tall concrete blockhouse.

A previous lookout tower was built on Eagle Peak in 1929 and was ultimately replaced by the current Eagle Peak Lookout in 1955.

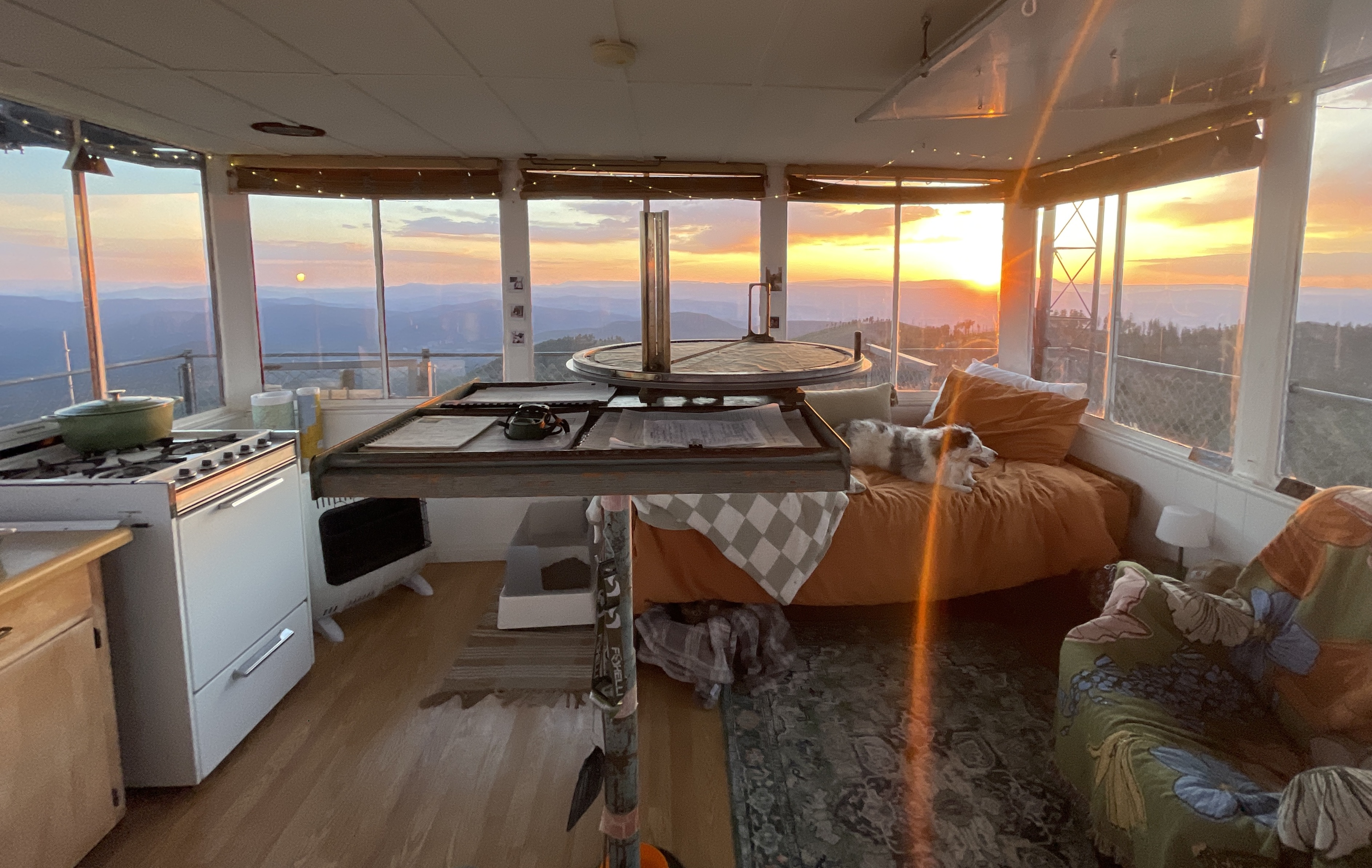
Sunset from inside Eagle Peak Lookout

== Geography and climate ==
Eagle Peak Lookout sits atop the summit of Eagle Peak Mountain at an elevation of 9,801 ft. (2,987 m) Eagle Peak is the highest point in the Tularosa Mountains.

Eagle Peak has a semi-arid climate. The peak typically receives half of its annual precipitation during the monsoon season beginning in July and lasting until September.

Temperature in the summer typically range from highs in the 80's °F to lows in the 40's °F.

== Access ==
Eagle Peak Lookout is accessible by NFSR 233 which provides access to Eagle Peak Road #38, as well as hiking trails #768 and #766.

== See also ==
- Fire lookout
- Wildfire suppression
- Lookout tree
