= Southern Nevada 2A Region =

High school athletic subdivision in Nevada, US

The Southern Nevada 2A Region is a part of the Nevada Interscholastic Activities Association, governing the mostly-southern part of Nevada for high school athletics. There are currently 10 member schools in the Southern 2A league for the 2011–2012 school year, one of which is located in California (Needles High School).

== Current members ==
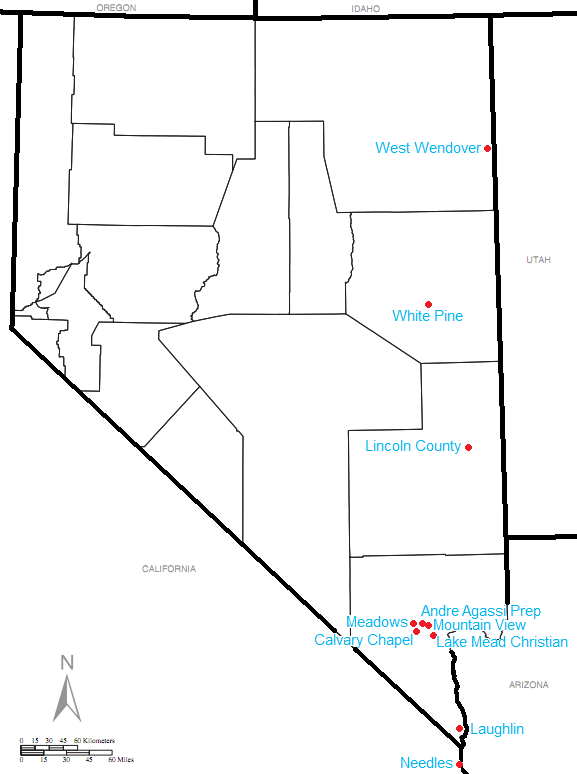
Southern Nevada 2A Region membership as of the 2011–12 school year.

School	Nickname	Colors	Address
Andre Agassi Prep	Stars	Navy & Burgundy	1201 West Lake Mead Blvd. Las Vegas, NV 89106
Calvary Chapel	Lions	Royal Blue, Gold, & White	7065 W. Oquendo; Las Vegas, NV 89113
Lake Mead Christian	Eagles	Navy, White, & Gold	540 E. Lake Mead Pkwy. Henderson, NV 89015
Laughlin	Cougars	Royal Blue & Silver	1900 Cougar Dr. Laughlin, NV 89028
Lincoln County	Lynx	Red & White	1111 Edwards St. Panaca, NV 89042
Meadows	Mustangs	Blue & Silver	8601 Scholar Ln. Las Vegas, NV 89128
Mountain View	Saints	Red, Black, & Silver	3900 E. Bonanza Rd. Las Vegas, NV 89110
Needles	Mustangs	Royal Blue & White	1900 Erin Dr. Needles, CA 92363
West Wendover	Wolverines	Burgundy, Black, & White	2055 Elko Ave. West Wendover, NV 89883
White Pine	Bobcats	Blue, & White	1800 Bobcat Dr. Ely, NV 89301

== See also ==
- Nevada Interscholastic Activities Association
- Sunset 4A Region
- Northern Nevada 3A Region
- Northern Nevada 4A Region
- Sunrise 4A Region
- Sunset 4A Region
