= Needles High School =

Public high school in Needles, California, U.S.

Coordinates: 34°50′26″N 114°36′59″W

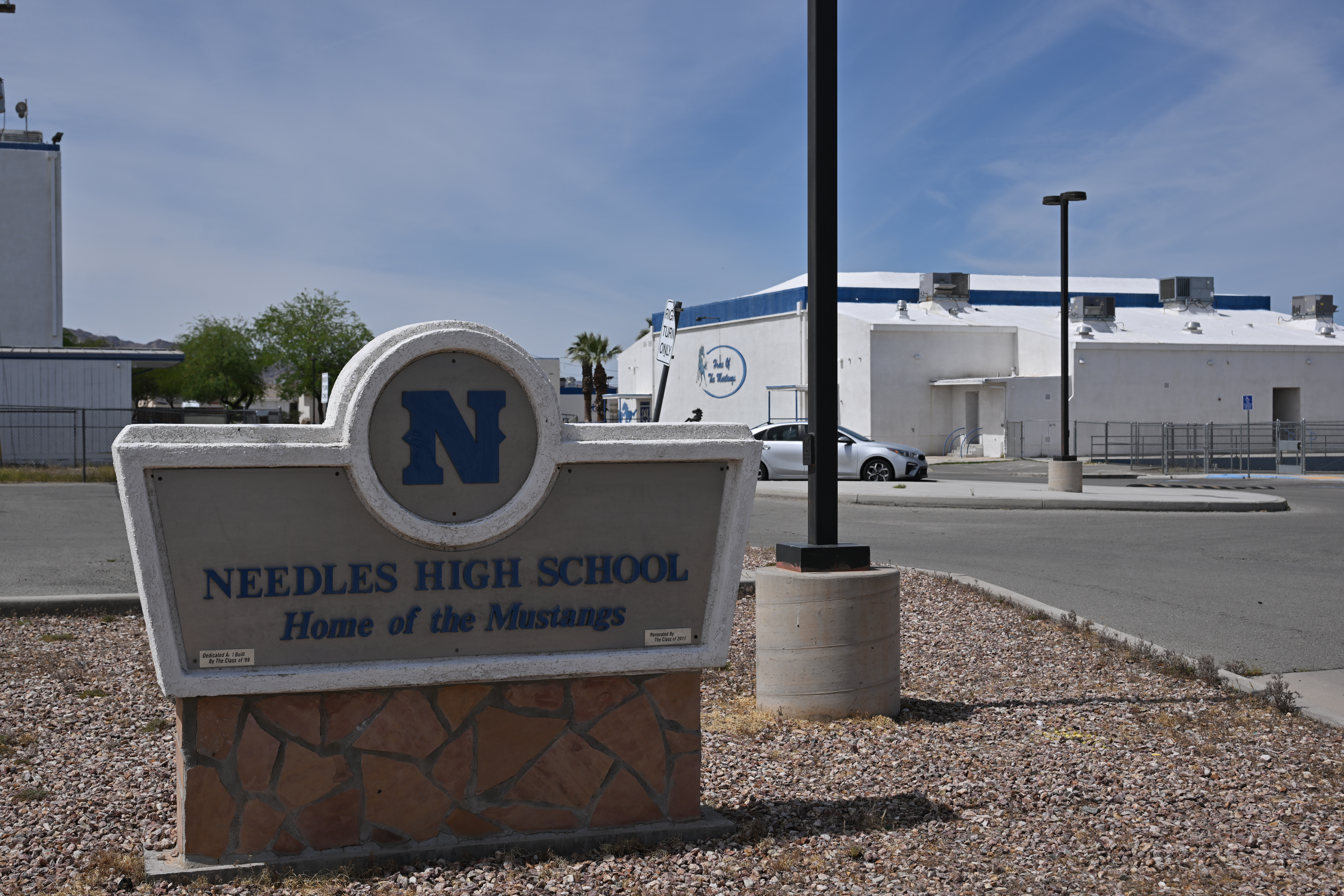

Location
- 1600 Washington St; Needles, California

Information
- Type: Public high school
- Principal: Amy Avila
- Staff: 14.86 (FTE)
- Enrollment: 267 (2023–2024)
- Student to teacher ratio: 17.97
- Campus: Rural
- Colors: Royal Blue and White
- Athletics conference: Southern Nevada 2A Region
- Team name: Mustangs
- Website: Official website

Needles High School (NHS) is a public high school in Needles, California. It is part of the Needles Unified School District. The school mascot is the Mustang, and the school colors are royal blue and white. The current alma mater, "All Hail to Thee," was written by members of the Class of 1959 as their gift to NHS as outgoing seniors. Needles High School was featured on a School Pride television episode November 12, 2010. Needles High is one of five California high schools that are part of the Nevada Interscholastic Activities Association.

== Athletics ==
Needles High is one of five California high schools that is a member of the governing body for high school athletics in Nevada, the Nevada Interscholastic Activities Association, rather than the California Interscholastic Federation. All five of these schools are close to a large number of Nevada schools and relatively isolated from other California schools. Needles' football team, as well as the other school athletic teams, competes in the NIAA AA Football Division. On November 17, 2007, the Mustangs won the 2A State Championship game, played at Damonte Ranch High Stadium in Reno, Nevada, defeating the Yerington High School Lions, 18–14. On February 25, 2017, the Lady 'Stangs won the NIAA AA State Championship in Basketball, defeating Democracy Prep at the Agassi Campus, 64–54.

=== Nevada Interscholastic Activities Association State Championships ===
- Baseball - 1990, 1991, 1995, 1997, 1999, 2000, 2008, 2009
- Basketball (Boys) -1988, 1991, 1999, 2002, 2009
- Basketball (Girls) - 2008, 2009, 2016, 2017
- Football - 2007
- Softball - 1989, 1990, 1991, 1997, 1998, 2000, 2007, 2008, 2009, 2010, 2017, 2019, 2022

== Notes and references ==
- U.S. Geological Survey Geographic Names Information System: Needles High School
