= Chemehuevi Wash =

Watercourse in California, US

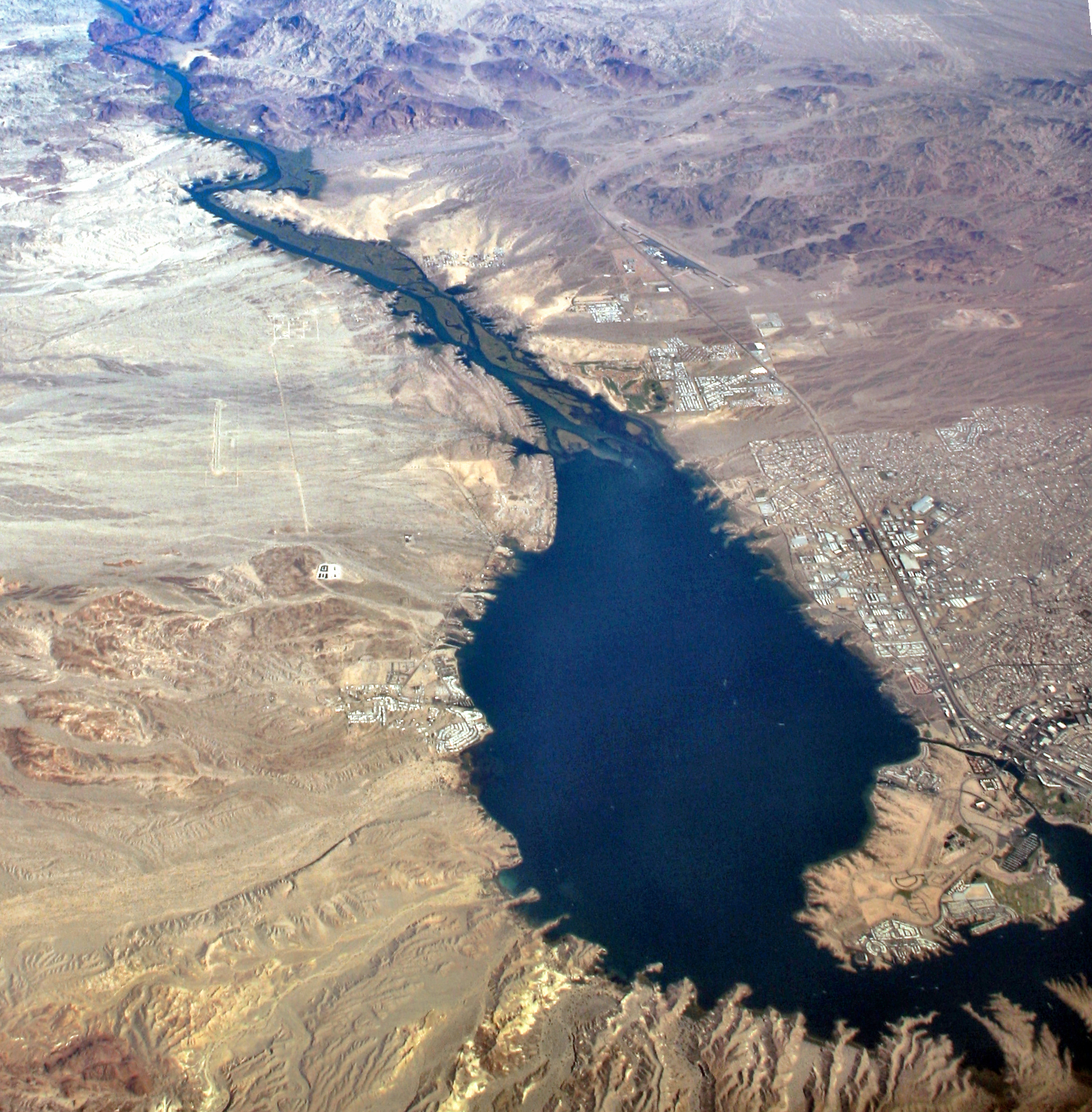
- View due north Wash outfall at center-west of Lake Havasu

- Chemehuevi Wash in California

Location
- Country: United States
- State: California
- Region: (southeast)-Mojave Desert (Lower Colorado River Valley)
- District: San Bernardino County, CA
- City: Havasu Lake, CA–Lake Havasu City, AZ

Physical characteristics
- Length: 35 mi (56 km), NW-SE, (then E)

The Chemehuevi Wash is a large wash of northeast San Bernardino County in the southeast Mojave Desert. The wash enters the center-west bank of Lake Havasu on the California–Arizona border. Chemehuevi Wash drains the center of the Chemehuevi Valley and the regional landforms of washes, valleys and mountains is adjacent the northeast region of the Colorado Desert, the entire region south on the west side of the south-flowing Colorado River.

== Description ==
The 35-mile (56 km) long Chemehuevi Wash drains the center of Chemehuevi Valley; it begins southwest of the center of the Sacramento Mountains, with the water divide separating the northwest draining Ward Valley, a southwest tributary to the Piute Wash region west and northwest of Needles. The Chemehuevi Wash and Valley drain southeasterly, then turn due east for about 12 miles.

The Chemehuevi Wash and Valley are about 15 miles (24 km) wide and the change in direction of the drainage to due east to meet the west shore of Lake Havasu is caused by the blocks of mountains, the Turtle Mountains southwest, and the Whipple Mountains southeast; the large Whipple massif is also the cause of the change in the due-south course of the Colorado River changing from southeast, back to southwest. The Colorado River then continues mostly south, but again makes other turns before reaching the north of the Gulf of California.

=== Stepladder Mountains Wilderness ===
The Stepladder Mountains Wilderness, (Stepladder Mountains), is located in the center of Chemehuevi Valley, near the wash source regions in the northwest.

=== Watersheds ===
The Chemehuevi Wash Watershed is south of the Piute Wash of southeast Nevada and California. The watershed is a western tributary to the Havasu-Mohave Lakes Watershed.
