= Eagle Peak (Admiralty Island) =

Mountain in Alaska, United States

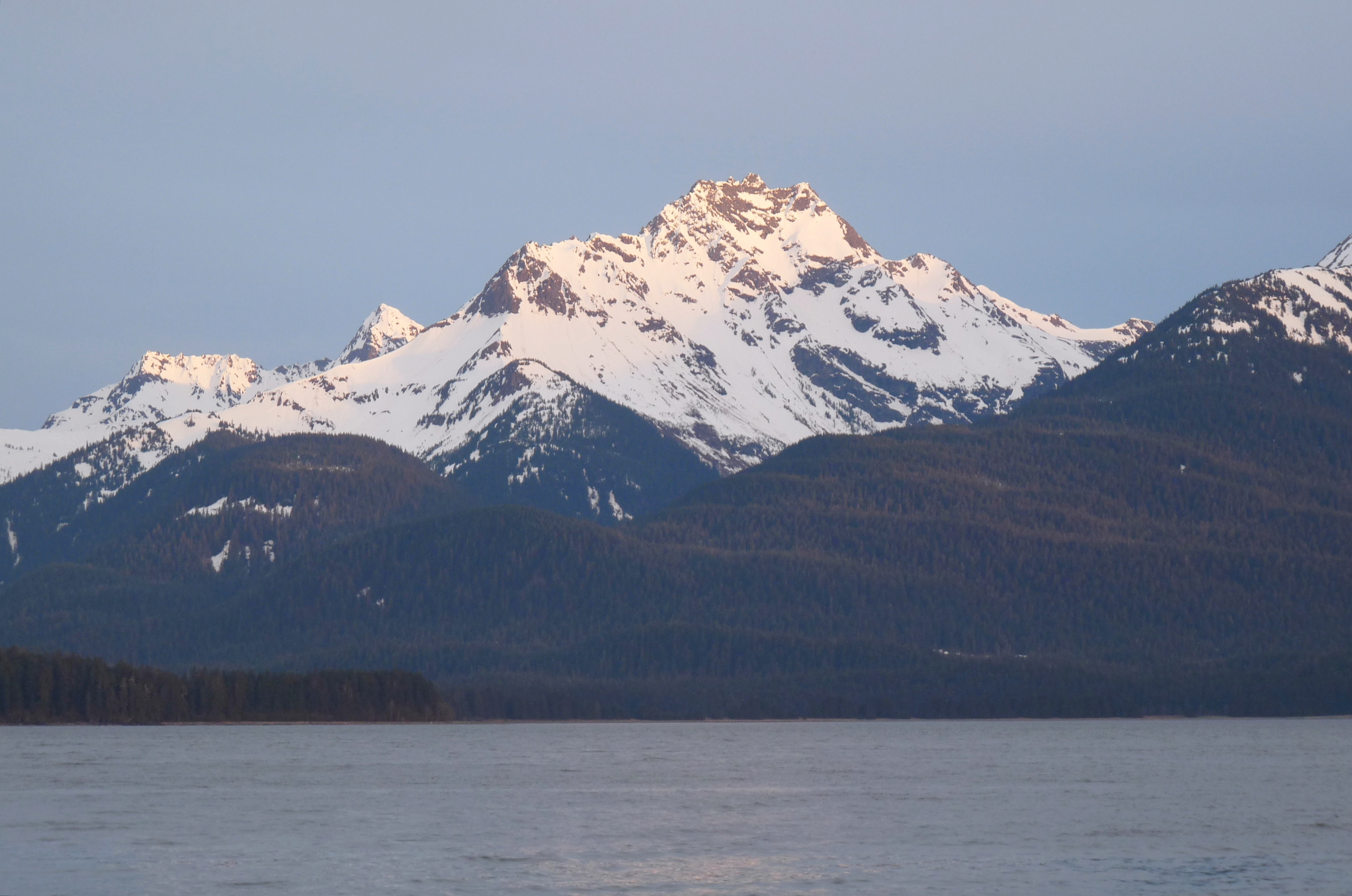
- Eagle Peak seen from Douglas Island

Highest point
- Elevation: 4,650 ft (1,420 m)
- Prominence: 2,900 ft (880 m)
- Parent peak: Admiralty Island High Point (4,850 ft)
- Isolation: 18.33 mi (29.50 km)
- Coordinates: 58°06′49″N 134°32′44″W

Geography
- Location within Alaska
- Interactive map of Eagle Peak
- Location: Admiralty Island National Monument; Hoonah-Angoon; Alaska, United States
- Parent range: Alexander Archipelago
- Topo map: USGS Juneau A-2

Climbing
- Easiest route: class 4 scrambling

Eagle Peak is a prominent 4,650-foot (1,417 m) elevation mountain summit located on Admiralty Island in the Alexander Archipelago, in the U.S. state of Alaska. It is the second-highest peak on the island, and is situated 14 mi (23 km) southwest of Juneau, within Admiralty Island National Monument, on land managed by Tongass National Forest. Although modest in elevation, relief is significant since the peak rises up from tidewater at Stephens Passage in 4.5 mi (7 km). This geographic feature's local name was published by the U.S. Geological Survey in 1951.

== Climate ==
Based on the Köppen climate classification, Eagle Peak has a subarctic climate with cold, snowy winters, and mild summers. Weather systems coming off the Gulf of Alaska are forced upwards by the mountains (orographic lift), causing heavy precipitation in the form of rainfall and snowfall. Winter temperatures can drop below −20 °C with wind chill factors below −30 °C. The month of July offers the most favorable weather for viewing or climbing Eagle Peak.

== Gallery ==
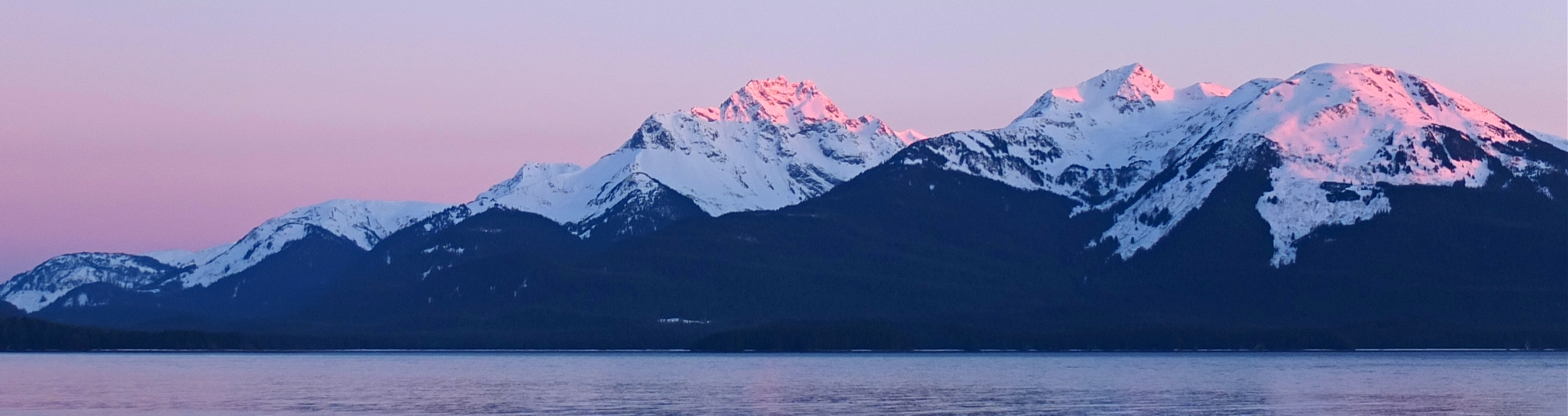
Looking southwest at Eagle Peak at sunset

== See also ==
- List of mountain peaks of Alaska
- Geography of Alaska
