= Franconia, Arizona =

- Location within the state of Arizona Franconia (the United States)
- Coordinates: 34°44′22″N 114°16′06″W
- Country: United States
- State: Arizona
- County: Mohave
- Elevation: 1,102 ft (336 m)
- Time zone: UTC-7 (Mountain (MST))
  - Summer (DST): UTC-7 (MST)
- Area code: 928
- FIPS code: 04-25580
- GNIS feature ID: 24424

Franconia is a former railroad siding in Mohave County, Arizona, United States. It has an estimated elevation of 1,102 feet (336 m) above sea level.
