= Eagle Peak (San Bernardino County, California) =

Mountain in San Bernardino County, California, United States

- Location within California

Highest point
- Elevation: 3,235 feet (986 m)
- Prominence: 1,206 ft (368 m)
- Coordinates: 34°46′43″N 114°45′20″W

Geography
- Location: San Bernardino County, California
- Parent range: Sacramento Mountains

Eagle Peak is a mountain peak located in San Bernardino County, California.

The summit is 3,235 feet (986 m) in elevation making it the highest mountain in the Sacramento Mountains.

== See also ==
- Sacramento Mountains
