= Sacramento Mountains (California) =

Mountain range in California, United States

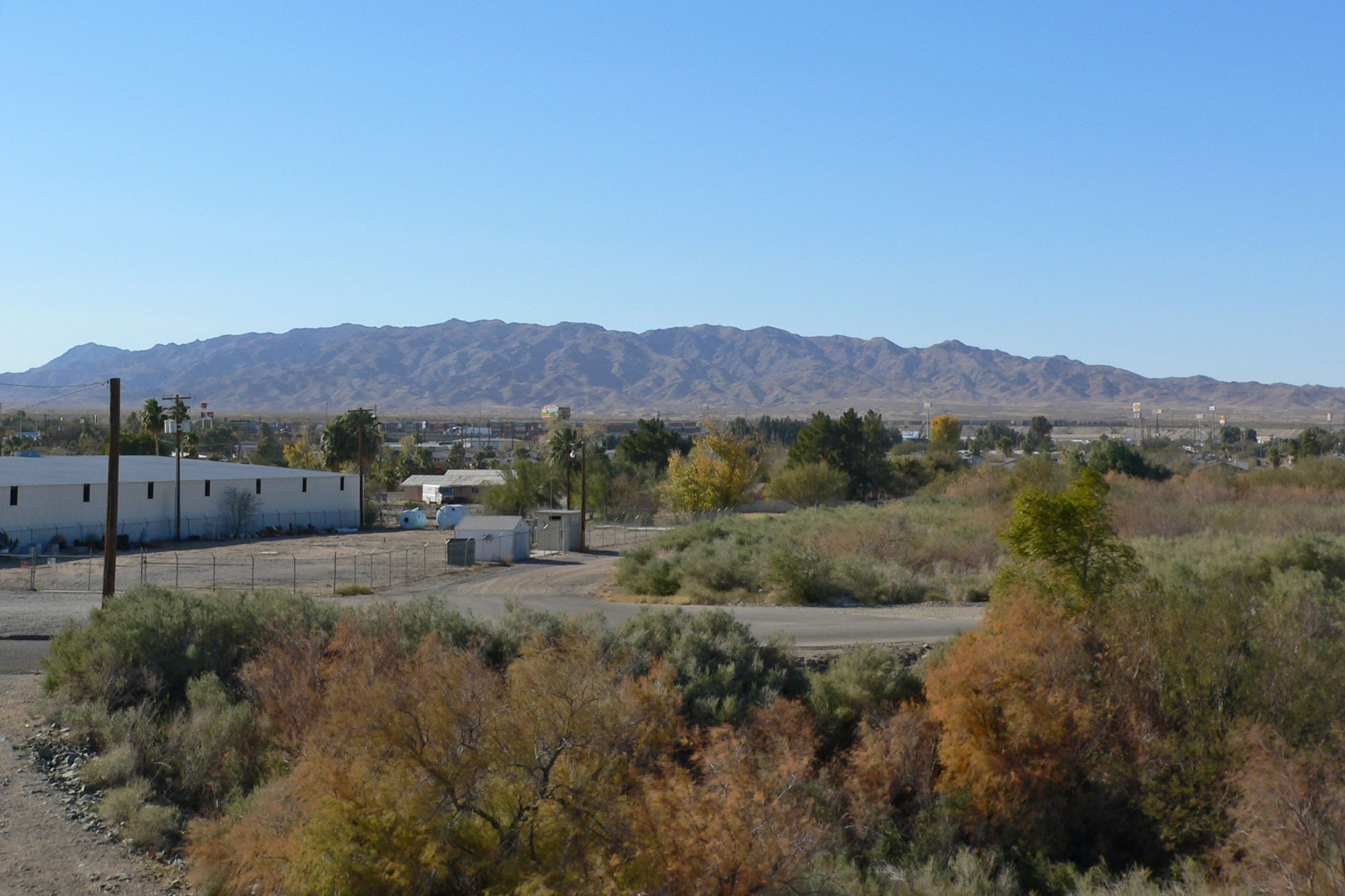
- view looking south from River Bridge (6-(?) miles north of Needles)

Highest point
- Peak: Eagle Peak
- Elevation: 3,308 ft (1,008 m)

Dimensions
- Length: 16 mi (26 km) NW-SE
- Width: 10 mi (16 km)

Geography
- Location within California
- Country: United States
- State: California
- Region: Mojave Desert
- County: San Bernardino
- Geological features: Topock Marsh; Mohave Valley; Colorado River
- Settlements: Needles, California; Topock, Arizona
- Range coordinates: 34°46′30″N 114°45′3″W
- Borders on: Chemehuevi Valley; Piute Wash; I-40; Colorado River; Chemehuevi Mountains
- Topo map: USGS Flattop Mountain

The Sacramento Mountains are a mountain range in the Eastern Mojave Desert and within Mojave Trails National Monument, in San Bernardino County, California.

== Geography ==
The range is southwest of Needles and form part of the towns west and southwest border; the range is east of the Piute Mountains, south of the Dead Mountains, and northwest of the Chemehuevi Mountains. The range lies in a northwest-southeasterly direction south of Interstate 40, and reach an elevation of 3,308 feet above sea level at Eagles Peak. The Sacramento Mountains are approximately 16 miles long.

Eagle Pass and Eagle Peak are in the south-center of the range; an unimproved road through Eagle Pass connects Needles to the Ward Valley. Flattop Mountain, at 3,029 feet (923 m), lies at the northwest of the range just south of Interstate 40.

The Sacramento Mountains are bordered on the west by the Ward Valley which merges southeasterly into the southeast-draining Chemehuevi Valley and Wash. The southeast of the Sacramento's merge into a range of equal size, the Chemehuevi Mountains. Both ranges are bordered on the east by a southeast-flowing Colorado River which turns back southwest at the Whipple Mountains.

Needles lies at the east and southeast of the range, as the Colorado River flows along the perimeter of the mountain; the river follows the southwest corner of the Mohave Valley of the Fort Mojave Indian Reservation and Mohave Valley, Arizona. The southeast of the Sacramento Mountains border the Chemehuevi's with higher elevations in the Chemehuevi's along the Colorado. At this southern section of the Mohave Valley, Interstate 40 in California crosses into Arizona south of Topock and the Topock Marsh.

The Chemehuevi Wash and Valley southwest of the Sacramento Mountains is one of the major washes along the western California side of the Colorado River. The Piute Wash drains northwest of Needles. Mostly minor, shorter length washes and valleys are found southward towards Yuma, Arizona and Winterhaven, California, many miles downstream.

Name

The Sacramento Mountains are also named for the Sacramento Wash and Sacramento Valley across the Colorado River across from the range, that drains northwestern Mohave County, Arizona into the Topock Marsh.

== Adjacent ranges ==
- Turtle Mountains — on south.
- Piute Mountains — to the west.
- Dead Mountains — to the north.
- Chemehuevi Mountains — to the southeast.
