= Eagle Peak (New Mexico) =

Mountain in New Mexico, United States

- Location within New Mexico

Highest point
- Elevation: 9,801 ft (2,987 m) NAVD 88
- Prominence: 2,266 ft (691 m)
- Coordinates: 33°40′37″N 108°34′37″W

Geography
- Location: Catron County, New Mexico, U.S.
- Parent range: Tularosa Mountains
- Topo map: USGS Eagle Peak

Eagle Peak is a mountain in Catron County, New Mexico, near the town of Reserve. The summit is the highest point in the Tularosa Mountains.
