= Topock Gorge =

Section of the Colorado River in Arizona–California

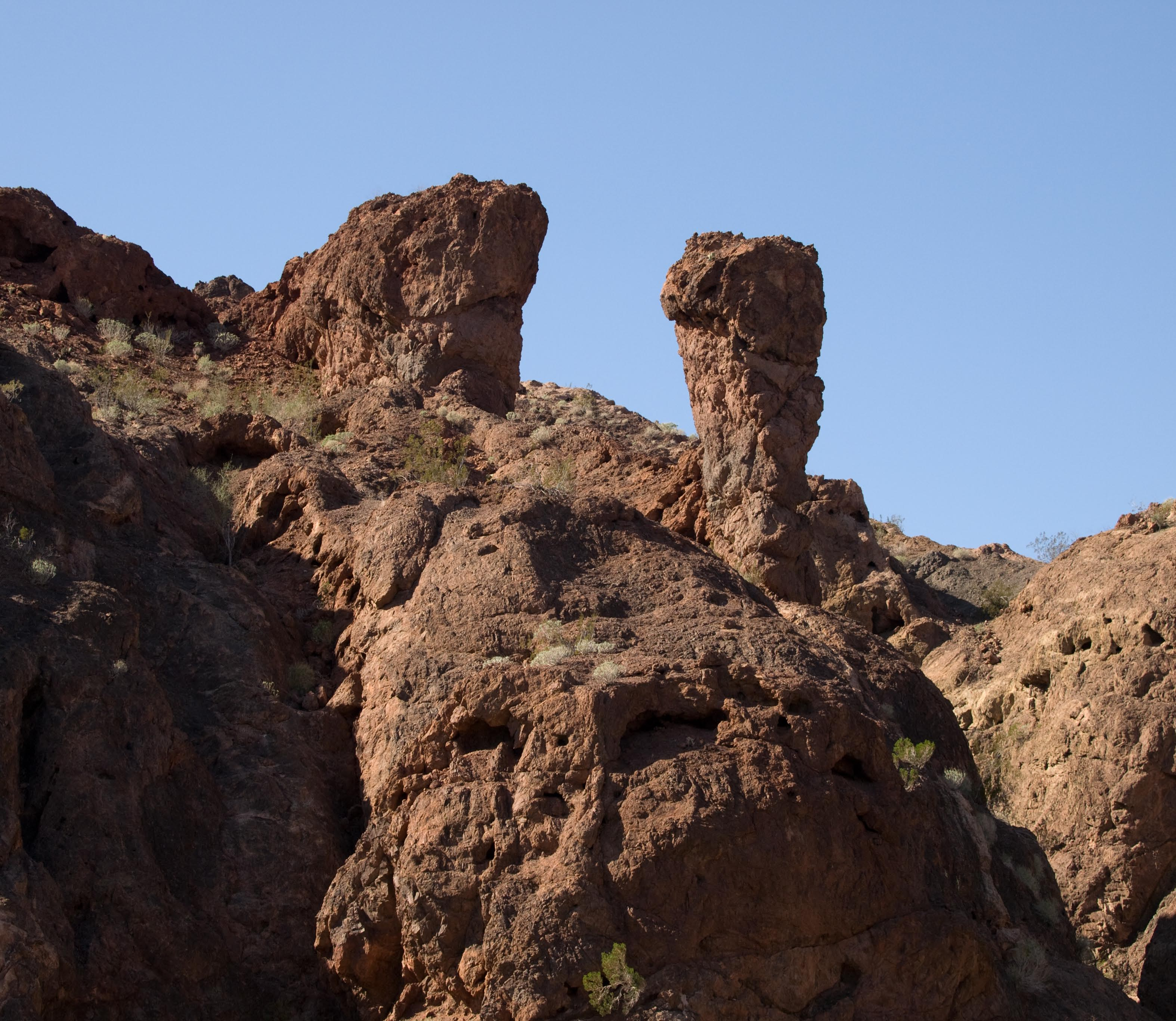
- Rock formations in Topock Canyon on the Colorado River, 2010

- Location within Arizona
- Location: Mohave County, Arizona / San Bernardino County, California, United States
- Coordinates: 34°39′40″N 114°27′19″W
- Basin countries: United States
- Average depth: 15 ft (4.6 m)
- Surface elevation: 500 ft (150 m)
- References: GNIS data

Topock Gorge is a mountainous canyon and gorge section of the Colorado River, located between Interstate 40 and Lake Havasu. The town of Needles, California, to the northwest, was named for the "needle-like" vertical rock outcroppings. The natural landmarks and river crossing by them were one of the journey markers for travelers on historic Route 66.

== Havasu National Wildlife Refuge ==
The Topock Gorge is within the Havasu National Wildlife Refuge, managed by the United States Fish and Wildlife Service. It features natural habitat, wildlife, scenic preservation, and archeology. Mojave people Indian petroglyphs are in the Gorge.

=== Fish species ===
- Rainbow
- Largemouth Bass
- Striped Bass
- Crappie
- Sunfish
- Catfish (Channel)
- Carp

Amphibians

- Bullfrogs
