= Havasu National Wildlife Refuge =

National Wildlife Refuge in California and Arizona in the United States

- IUCN category IV (habitat/species management area)
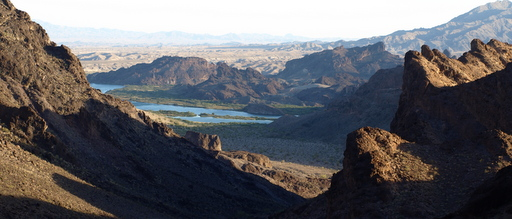

- Location within the United States
- Location: Mohave County, Arizona / San Bernardino County, California, U.S.
- Nearest city: Needles, California
- Coordinates: 34.6095812°N 114.4173321°W
- Area: 37,515 acres (151.82 km^{2})
- Established: 1941
- Governing body: U.S. Fish and Wildlife Service
- Website: www.fws.gov/refuge/Havasu

Havasu National Wildlife Refuge is a U.S. National Wildlife Refuge on the lower Colorado River in Arizona and California. It preserves habitat for wildlife like desert bighorn sheep, the endangered southwestern willow flycatcher, the threatened Yuma Ridgways Rail and other animals. The refuge protects 30 river miles - 300 miles (480 km) of shoreline - from Needles, California, to Lake Havasu City, Arizona. One of the last remaining natural stretches of the lower Colorado River flows through the 20-mile-long (32 km) Topock Gorge.

== Species ==
Animal species that inhabit this refuge include peregrine falcon, coyote, fox, desert bighorn sheep, greater roadrunner, bobcat, and cougar. Thousands of bats emerge from historic mines and razorback suckers swim in the back of Mohave Valley Lake.

== Support ==
A large river in a dry, hot land attracts wildlife and people like a powerful magnet. Many millions of visitors annually flock to the refuge to boat through the Topock Gorge, watch waterbirds in Topock Marsh, or hike to the Havasu Wilderness Area.

A non-profit membership organization supports and advocates for the refuge. It assists refuge staff with several of the refuge annual events, help to obtain grants to support refuge projects, conducts fund-raising activities to support environmental education programs, and helps the United States Fish and Wildlife Service operate and maintain the refuge facilities and programs by providing volunteer labor.

== Locations ==
Fivemile Landing, Arizona
- Interactive map of Fivemile Landing, Arizona
- Coordinates: 34°47′43″N 114°30′21″W
- Elevation: 463 ft (141 m)
- GNIS feature ID: 24417

=== Five Mile Landing ===
To aid visitors to the Colorado River, The U.S. Fish and Wildlife Service had previously allowed a private concessioner to operate a boat launch, canoe rental, campsite, RV site, and a store in the refuge at Five-Mile Landing, a 35-acre (14 ha) site with boat ramps at Topock Marsh in the northern part of the refuge.

=== Topock Marsh ===
The Topock Marsh is one of the larger birding sites found in the Lower Colorado River Valley, between Hoover Dam and the Colorado River Delta.

=== Catfish Paradise ===
Catfish Paradise is an area located at the southern end of the Topock Marsh. Many species living in the area include Bullfrogs, Carp, Sunfish, Catfish (Channel), Crappie, Largemouth Bass, and Tilapia.

== See also ==
- List of National Wildlife Refuges
- List of wilderness areas of the United States
- List of Wildlife Refuges of the Lower Colorado River Valley
- Sonoran Desert topics index
