= Needles, California =

City in California, United States

- City
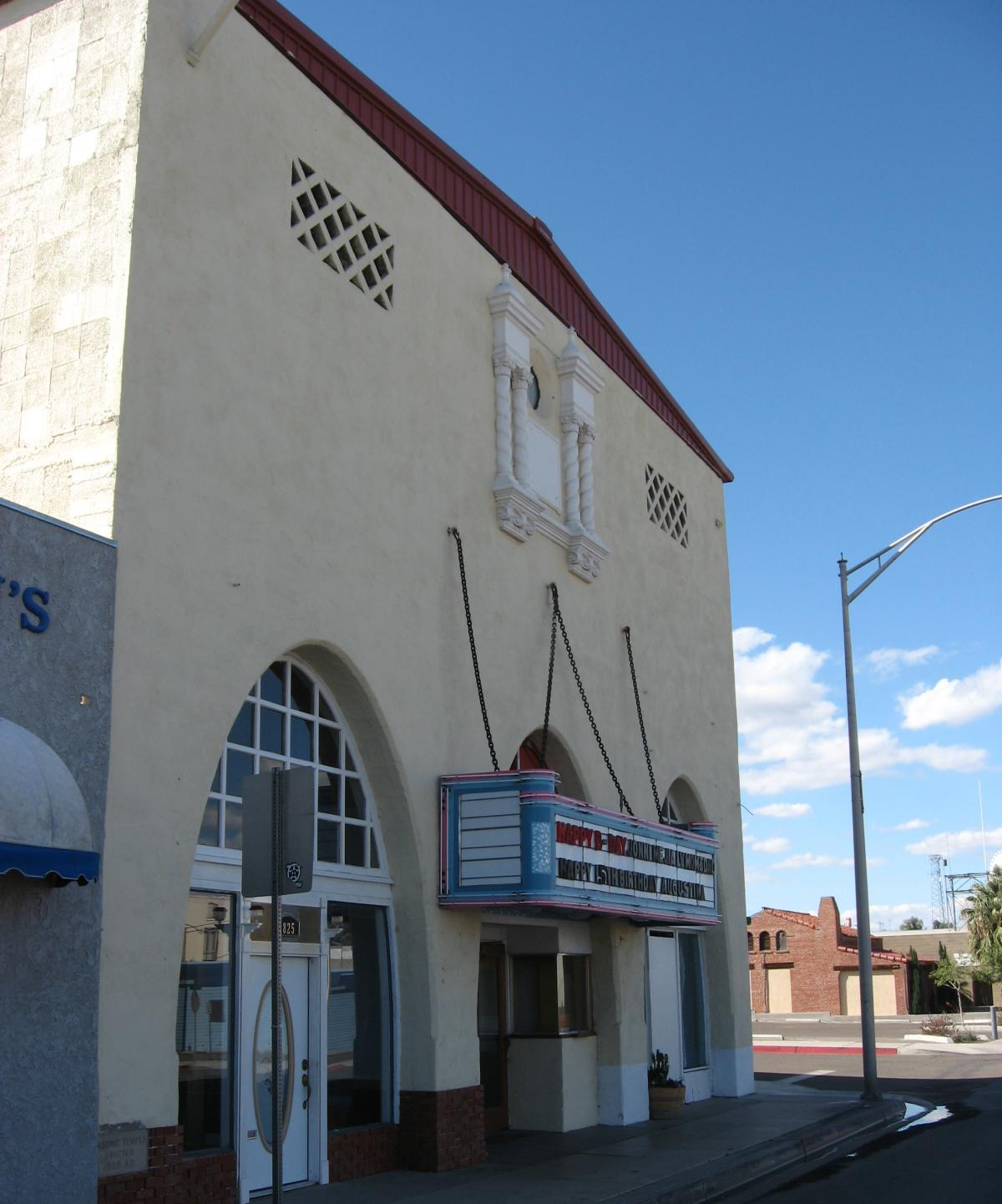
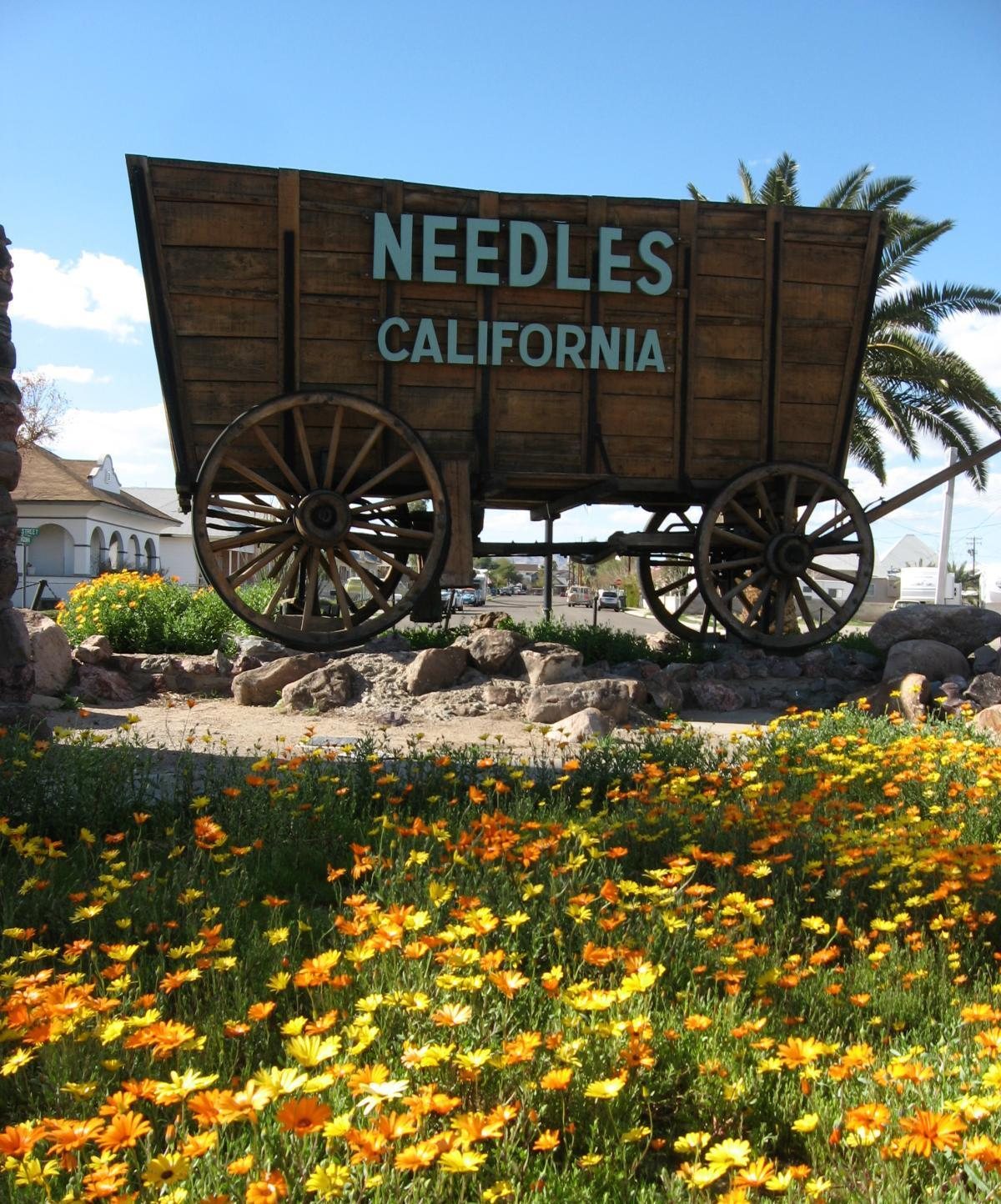
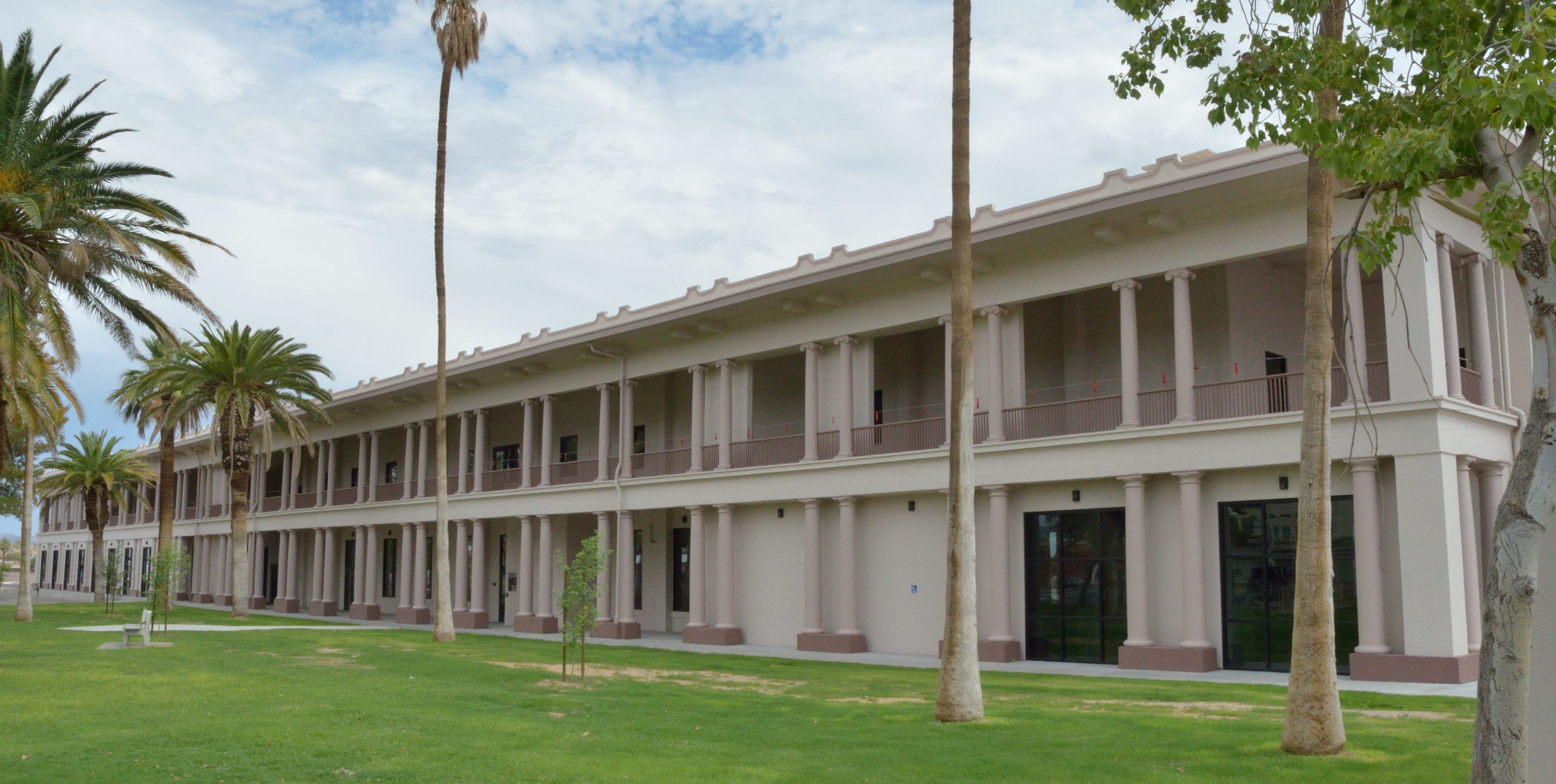
- Top: Needles Theatre (left), town sign (right); bottom: El Garcés.
- Interactive map of Needles, California
- Location within California Location within the United States
- Coordinates: 34°50′53″N 114°36′51″W
- Country: United States
- State: California
- County: San Bernardino
- Incorporated: October 30, 1913
- Named for: The Needles

Government
  - City manager: Patrick J. Martinez

Area
  - Total: 31.08 sq mi (80.49 km^{2})
  - Land: 30.58 sq mi (79.20 km^{2})
  - Water: 0.50 sq mi (1.29 km^{2}) 1.60%
- Elevation: 495 ft (151 m)

Population (2020)
  - Total: 4,931
  - Density: 161/sq mi (62.3/km^{2})
- Time zone: UTC−8 (Pacific)
  - Summer (DST): UTC−7 (PDT)
- ZIP Code: 92363
- Area codes: 442/760
- FIPS code: 06-50734
- GNIS feature IDs: 1652757, 2411220
- Website: cityofneedles.com

Needles is a city in San Bernardino County, in the Mojave Desert region of Southern California. Situated on the western banks of the Colorado River, Needles is located near the California border with Arizona and Nevada. The city is accessible via Interstate 40 and U.S. Route 95. The population was 4,931 at the 2020 census, up from 4,844 at the 2010 census.

== History ==
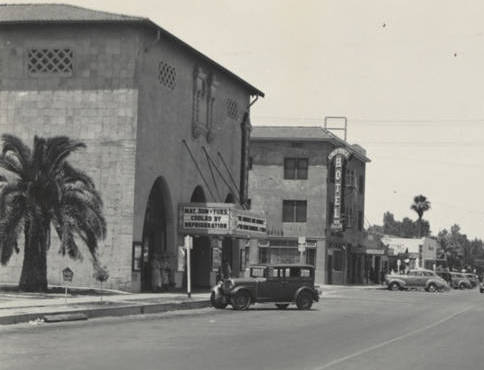
Downtown Needles, c. 1930s

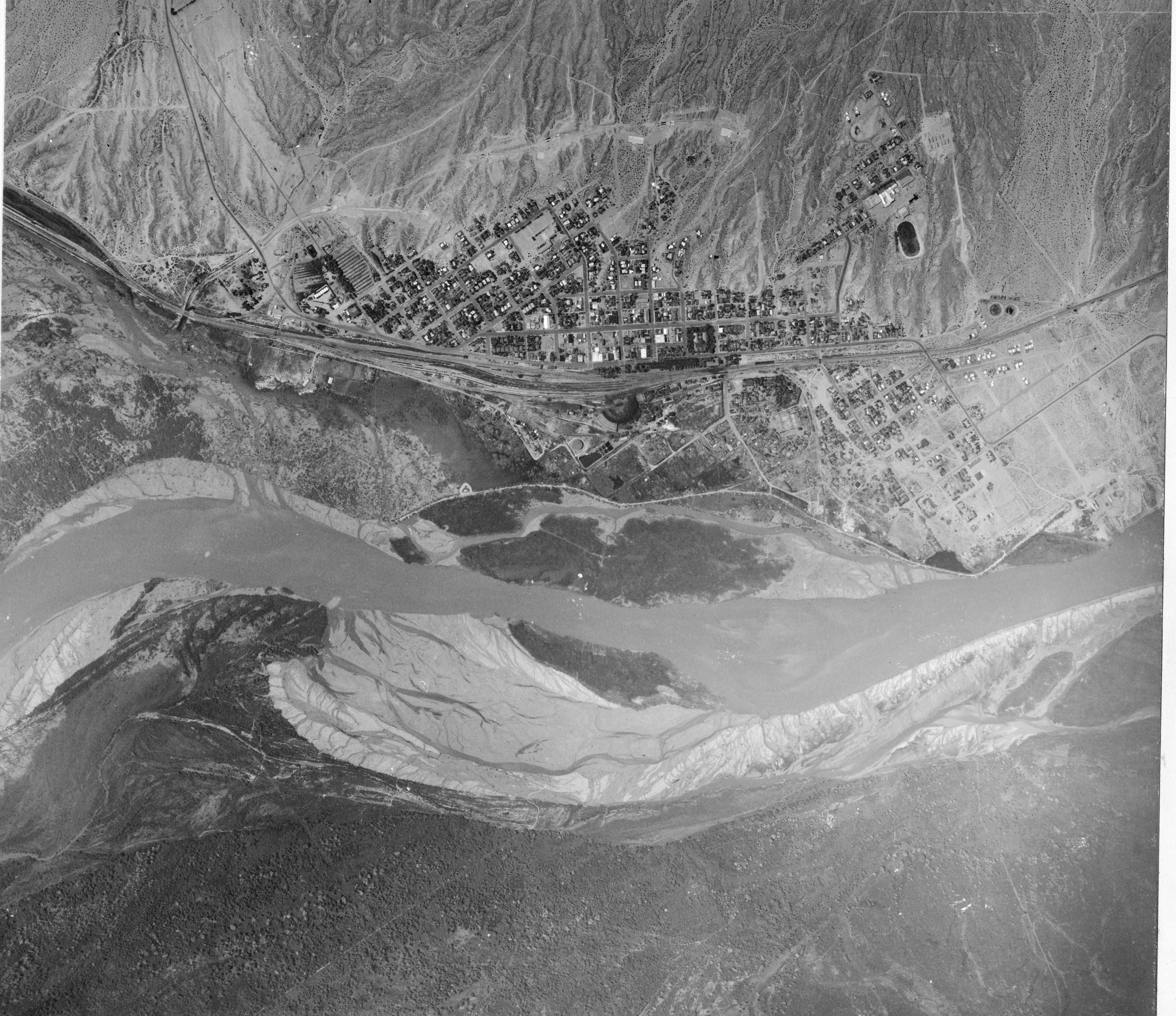
Aerial view of Needles, 1930s

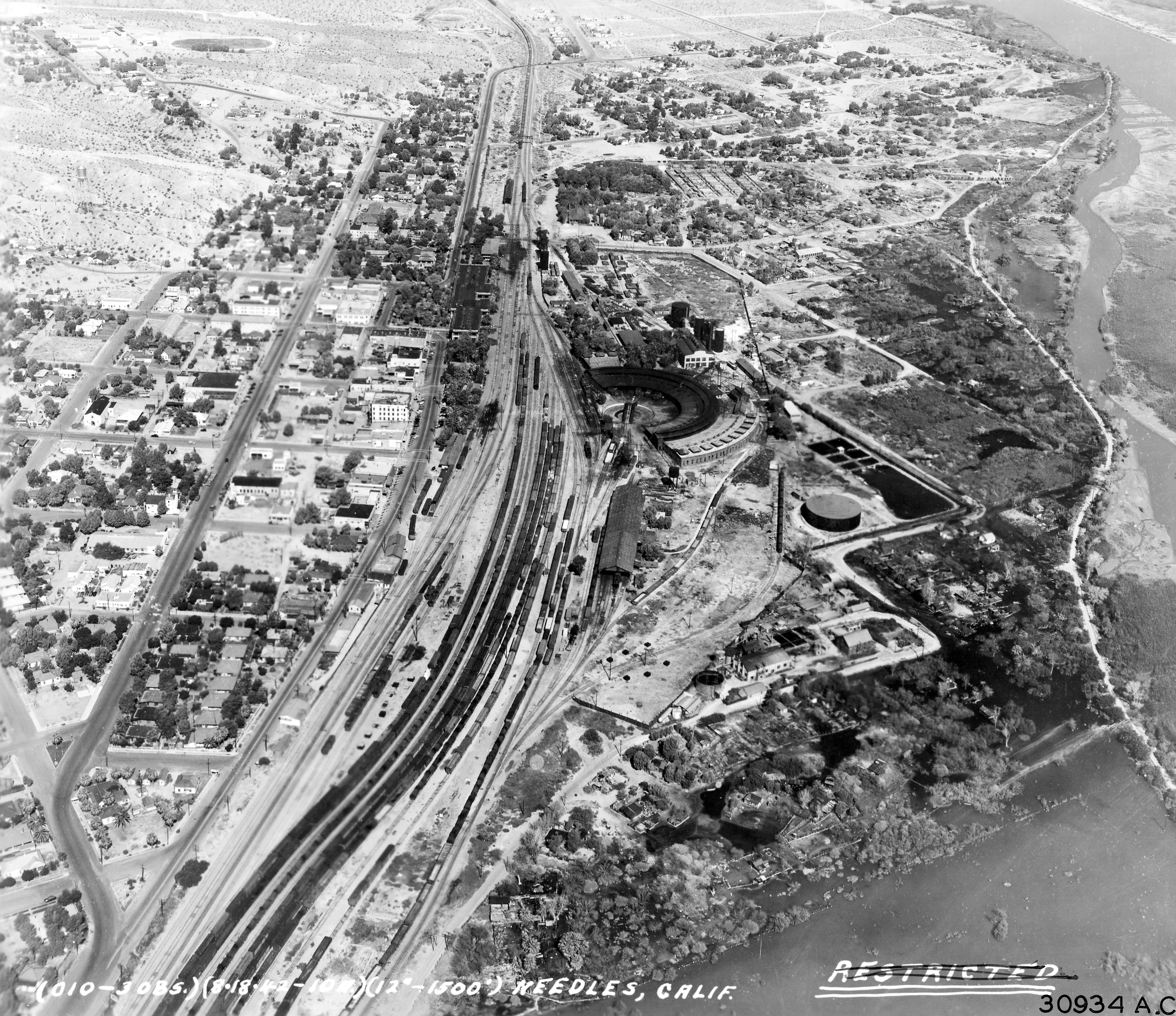
AT&SF rail yards in Needles, 1942

The Mojave people first inhabited the area.

Needles was founded in May 1883 during the construction of the Atchison, Topeka and Santa Fe Railway, which originally crossed the Colorado River at Eastbridge, Arizona, three miles southeast of modern Needles. Needles was named after "The Needles", a group of pinnacles in the Mohave Mountains on the Arizona side of the river. The crossing was a poor site for a bridge, lacking firm banks and a solid bottom.

A bridge was built, but it was of poor quality. Not only was it a "flimsy looking structure", but it was an obstacle to navigation on the river. Flooding on the Colorado River destroyed the bridge three times – in 1884, 1886 and 1888. The railway built Red Rock Bridge, a high cantilever bridge, at a narrower point with solid rock footings, ten miles downstream near today's Topock. The bridge was completed in May 1890, and the old bridge was dismantled.

At first it was a tent town for railroad construction crews, but the railway would eventually build a hotel, car sheds, shops and a roundhouse. Within only a month, Needles would have a Chinese laundry, a newsstand, a restaurant, several general stores, and nine or ten saloons. Needles quickly became the largest port on the river above Yuma, Arizona. The railway and the Fred Harvey Company built the elegant Neoclassical and Beaux-Arts style El Garces Hotel and Santa Fe Station in 1908, which was considered the "crown jewel" of the entire Fred Harvey chain. The landmark building is on the National Register of Historic Places and is being restored.

Needles was a major stop on the historic U.S. Route 66 highway from the 1920s through the 1960s. For migrants from the Midwest Dust Bowl in the 1930s, it was the town that marked their arrival in California. The city is lined with motels and other shops from that era. The "Carty's Camp", which appears briefly in The Grapes of Wrath as the Joad family enters California from Arizona, is now a ghost tourist court, its remains located behind the 1940s-era 66 Motel.

In 1949, the United States Bureau of Reclamation began an extensive project to dredge a new channel for the Colorado River that would straighten out a river bend that caused serious silt problems after the Hoover Dam was completed.

Needles is a tourism and recreation center. The city is the eastern gateway to the Mojave National Preserve, a scenic desert area.

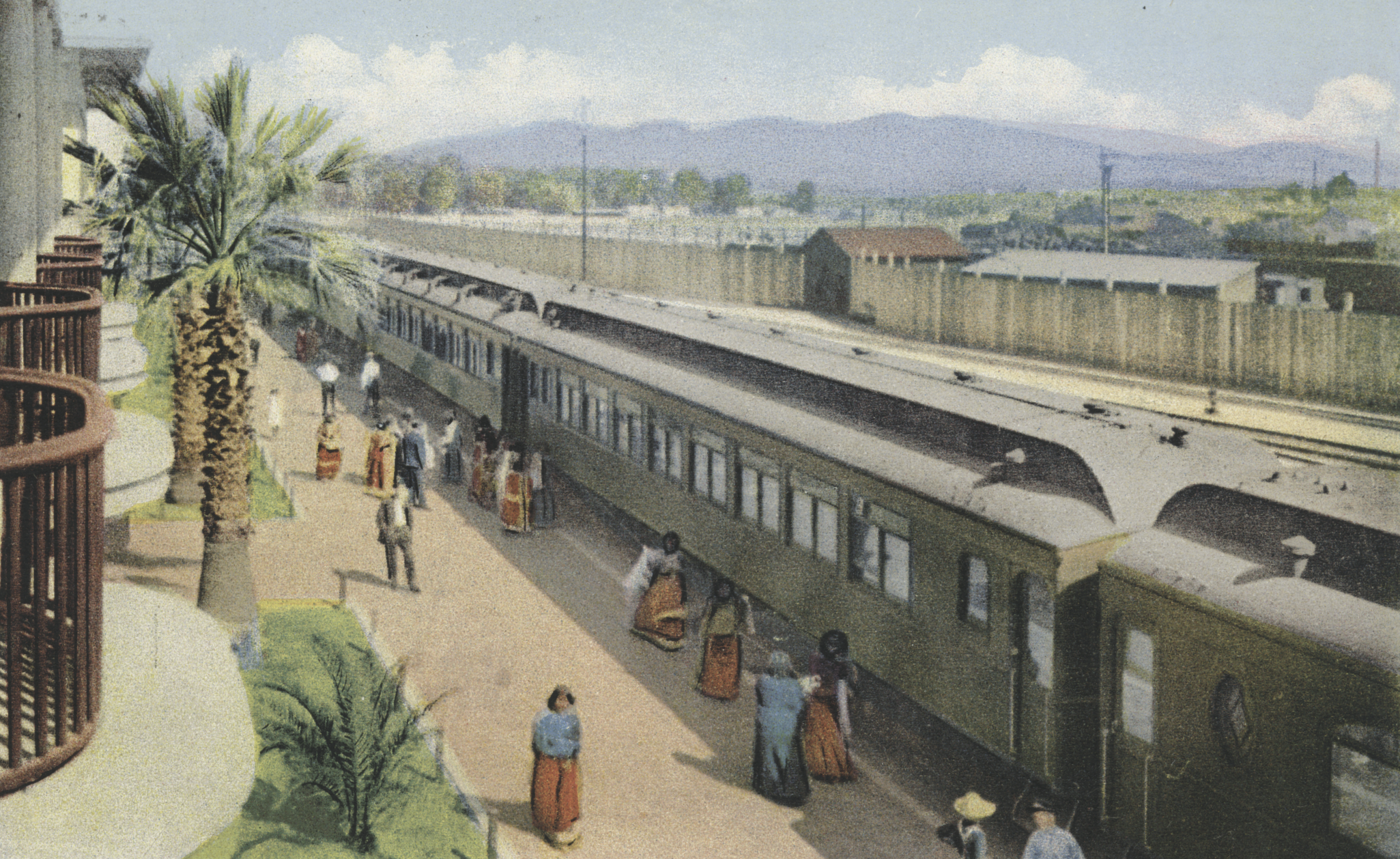
Trains at El Garcés, c. 1908

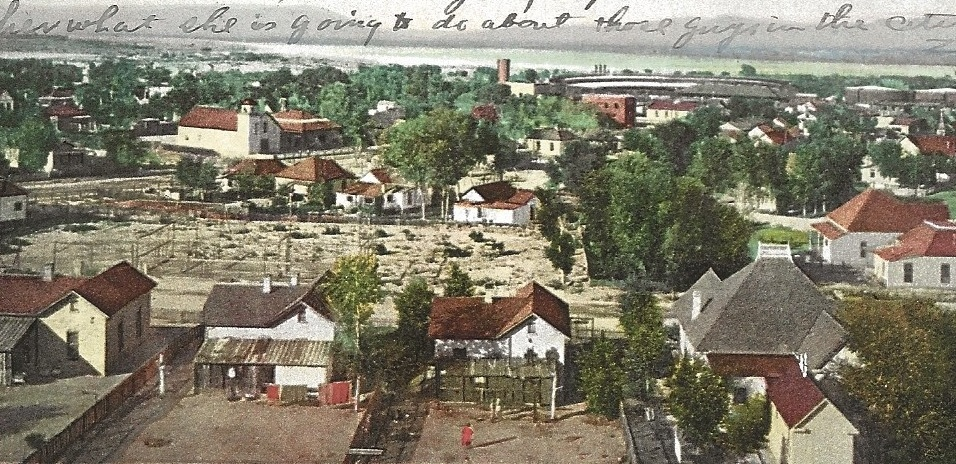
A view of Needles in 1912

== Geography ==
According to the United States Census Bureau, the city has a total area of 31.1 square miles (81 km^{2}). 30.6 square miles (79 km^{2}) of it is land and 0.5 square miles (1.3 km^{2}) of it (1.60%) is water.

=== Climate ===
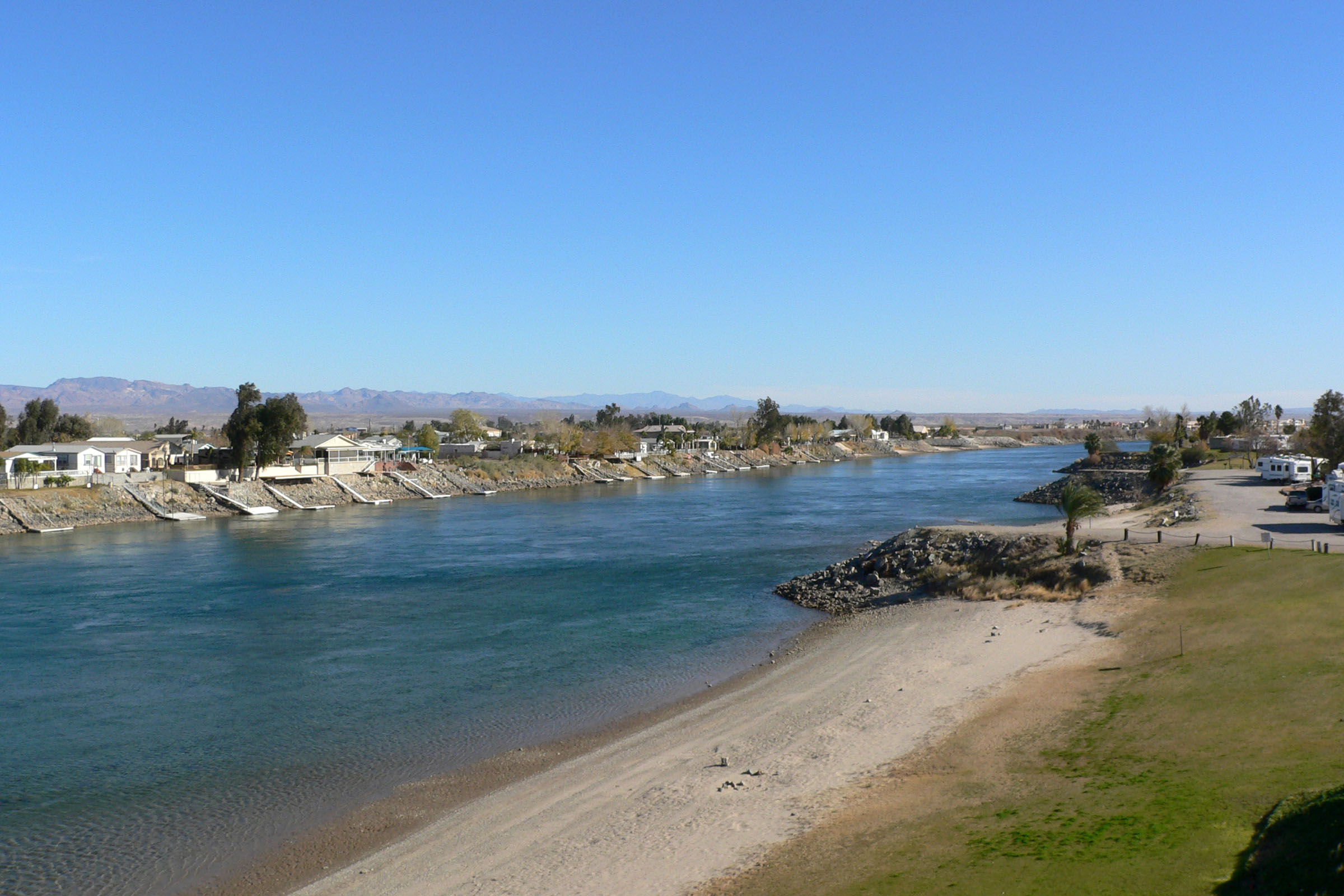
The Colorado River separates Needles, in California, from Mohave Valley, in Arizona.

The city has a desert climate with a subtropical temperature range, with a mean annual temperature of 76.2 °F (24.6 °C).

Needles, like Death Valley to the northwest, is known for extreme heat during the summer. The Needles weather station is frequently reported by the United States government's National Oceanic and Atmospheric Administration (NOAA) as the site of the highest daily temperature recorded in the U.S. during the desert summers. Needles occasionally sets national or world daily temperature records, along with other related records associated with extreme desert heat. For instance, on July 22, 2006, Needles experienced a record high low temperature of 100 °F (37.8 °C) at 6:00 am with a high temperature exceeding 120 °F (48.9 °C), making it one of the few locations on Earth that have recorded an overnight minimum temperature higher than 100 °F (37.8 °C).

On August 13, 2012, Needles experienced a thunderstorm that deposited rain at a temperature of 115 °F (46.1 °C) starting at 3:56 pm, setting a new record for the hottest rain in world history. The air temperature was 118 °F (47.8 °C), tying Needles's record high for the date. Since the humidity was only 11%, the rain evaporated so that "only a trace of precipitation was recorded in the rain gauge". Weather records researcher Maximiliano Herrera reported that this was the lowest humidity at which rain has occurred on Earth in recorded history. On May 4, 2014, Needles reached a temperature of 102 °F (38.9 °C) with a dewpoint of −38 °F (−38.9 °C), for a relative humidity of 0.33%, the lowest value ever recorded on Earth.

In the winter, temperatures are typically mild, with December, the coolest month, having a normal mean temperature of 54.7 °F (12.6 °C). The hottest month, July, has a normal mean temperature of 98.5 °F (36.9 °C). On average, there are 119 days annually with a maximum of 100 °F (37.8 °C) or higher, 175 days with a maximum of 90 °F (32.2 °C) or higher, and 2.7 days with a minimum of 32 °F (0 °C) or lower. Official record temperatures range from 18 °F (−7.8 °C) on January 22, 1937, to 125 °F (51.7 °C), last recorded on June 20, 2017.

Annual normal rainfall is 4.32 inches (109.7 mm), and there is an annual normal of 23 days with measurable precipitation. The wettest year was 1939 with 13.33 inches (338.6 mm) of rainfall and the driest year was 2006 with 0.7 inches (17.8 mm). The most rainfall in one month was 7.61 inches (193.3 mm) in September 1939. The most rainfall in a calendar day was 3.49 inches (88.6 mm) on August 19, 1906. Snowfall is very rare in Needles, with the only month recording measurable snowfall being January 1949, when 15.2 inches (38.6 cm) of snow fell, including 12.2 inches (31 cm) inches on January 12, 1949. The city is also known for moderate to locally severe thunderstorms during the monsoon season as well as humid conditions.

Needles is served by the National Weather Service's NOAA Weather Radio operating on 162.50 MHz from the Las Vegas National Weather Service.

Climate data for Needles Airport, California (1991–2020 normals, (Note: Mean monthly maxima and minima (i.e. the highest and lowest temperature readings during an entire month or year) calculated based on data at said location from 1991 to 2020.) extremes 1888–present)
Month	Jan	Feb	Mar	Apr	May	Jun	Jul	Aug	Sep	Oct	Nov	Dec	Year
Record high °F (°C)	85 (29)	92 (33)	106 (41)	107 (42)	118 (48)	125 (52)	125 (52)	123 (51)	120 (49)	112 (44)	93 (34)	83 (28)	125 (52)
Mean maximum °F (°C)	75.4 (24.1)	80.7 (27.1)	91.3 (32.9)	100.8 (38.2)	108.0 (42.2)	115.6 (46.4)	118.4 (48.0)	116.7 (47.1)	111.5 (44.2)	101.3 (38.5)	87.4 (30.8)	74.6 (23.7)	119.6 (48.7)
Mean daily maximum °F (°C)	66.4 (19.1)	71.0 (21.7)	79.1 (26.2)	86.6 (30.3)	96.2 (35.7)	106.4 (41.3)	110.5 (43.6)	109.3 (42.9)	102.6 (39.2)	89.5 (31.9)	75.1 (23.9)	64.5 (18.1)	88.1 (31.2)
Daily mean °F (°C)	56.2 (13.4)	59.9 (15.5)	66.6 (19.2)	73.7 (23.2)	83.1 (28.4)	93.0 (33.9)	98.5 (36.9)	97.4 (36.3)	90.0 (32.2)	77.0 (25.0)	63.8 (17.7)	54.7 (12.6)	76.2 (24.6)
Mean daily minimum °F (°C)	46.0 (7.8)	48.8 (9.3)	54.1 (12.3)	60.8 (16.0)	70.0 (21.1)	79.6 (26.4)	86.6 (30.3)	85.4 (29.7)	77.3 (25.2)	64.6 (18.1)	52.5 (11.4)	45.0 (7.2)	64.2 (17.9)
Mean minimum °F (°C)	34.0 (1.1)	37.1 (2.8)	41.9 (5.5)	48.6 (9.2)	56.5 (13.6)	66.2 (19.0)	75.6 (24.2)	74.9 (23.8)	65.0 (18.3)	51.5 (10.8)	39.7 (4.3)	33.4 (0.8)	31.8 (−0.1)
Record low °F (°C)	18 (−8)	22 (−6)	29 (−2)	33 (1)	39 (4)	46 (8)	57 (14)	60 (16)	40 (4)	34 (1)	25 (−4)	20 (−7)	18 (−8)
Average precipitation inches (mm)	0.73 (19)	0.79 (20)	0.51 (13)	0.18 (4.6)	0.07 (1.8)	0.04 (1.0)	0.27 (6.9)	0.39 (9.9)	0.34 (8.6)	0.22 (5.6)	0.34 (8.6)	0.44 (11)	4.32 (110)
Average precipitation days (≥ 0.01 in)	3.3	3.7	2.9	1.3	0.7	0.3	1.8	1.9	1.8	1.6	1.5	2.3	23.1
Mean monthly sunshine hours	248	254.3	310	360	403	420	403	372	330	310	240	248	3,898.3
Mean daily sunshine hours	8	9	10	12	13	14	13	12	11	10	8	8	11
Percentage possible sunshine	79	82	83	92	93	97	92	90	89	88	78	81	87
Average ultraviolet index	3	4	6	8	9	10	11	10	8	5	4	2	7
Source 1: NOAA WRCC
Source 2: Weather Atlas (sun and uv)

== Demographics ==
Historical population
Census	Pop.	Note	%±
1920	2,807		—
1930	3,144		12.0%
1940	3,624		15.3%
1950	4,051		11.8%
1960	4,590		13.3%
1970	4,051		−11.7%
1980	4,120		1.7%
1990	5,191		26.0%
2000	4,830		−7.0%
2010	4,844		0.3%
2020	4,931		1.8%
U.S. Decennial Census

Major employment in the city is supported by the BNSF Railway (formerly the Santa Fe Railroad). The depot has been a terminal (crew change point) for the railway since the late 19th century. The railroad company has been the city's main employment source for over a century.

The once smaller nearby communities of Bullhead City, Arizona, Lake Havasu City, Arizona, and Laughlin, Nevada, have in recent years become larger communities than Needles.

=== Racial and ethnic composition ===
Needles city, California – Racial and ethnic composition Note: the US Census treats Hispanic/Latino as an ethnic category. This table excludes Latinos from the racial categories and assigns them to a separate category. Hispanics/Latinos may be of any race.
Race / Ethnicity (NH = Non-Hispanic)	Pop 2000	Pop 2010	Pop 2020	% 2000	% 2010	% 2020
White alone (NH)	3,358	3,169	2,890	69.52%	65.42%	58.61%
Black or African American alone (NH)	71	90	116	1.47%	1.86%	2.35%
Native American or Alaska Native alone (NH)	270	296	349	5.59%	6.11%	7.08%
Asian alone (NH)	68	34	57	1.41%	0.70%	1.16%
Native Hawaiian or Pacific Islander alone (NH)	3	6	12	0.06%	0.12%	0.24%
Other race alone (NH)	8	1	29	0.17%	0.02%	0.59%
Mixed race or Multiracial (NH)	165	165	223	3.42%	3.41%	4.52%
Hispanic or Latino (any race)	887	1,083	1,255	18.36%	22.36%	25.45%
Total	4,830	4,844	4,931	100.00%	100.00%	100.00%

=== 2020 census ===
As of the 2020 census, Needles had a population of 4,931 and a population density of 161.3 inhabitants per square mile (62.3/km^{2}). The median age was 44.4 years, with 22.6% of residents under the age of 18, 6.8% aged 18 to 24, 21.4% aged 25 to 44, 28.3% aged 45 to 64, and 20.9% who were 65 years of age or older. For every 100 females there were 97.7 males, and for every 100 females age 18 and over there were 94.4 males age 18 and over.

Racial composition as of the 2020 census
Race	Number	Percent
White	3,322	67.4%
Black or African American	121	2.5%
American Indian and Alaska Native	445	9.0%
Asian	60	1.2%
Native Hawaiian and Other Pacific Islander	12	0.2%
Some other race	415	8.4%
Two or more races	556	11.3%

The census reported that 99.7% of the population lived in households, 0.3% lived in non-institutionalized group quarters, and no one was institutionalized. 95.4% of residents lived in urban areas, while 4.6% lived in rural areas.

There were 2,056 households in Needles, of which 27.2% had children under the age of 18 living in them. Of all households, 36.4% were married-couple households, 9.3% were cohabiting couple households, 22.9% were households with a male householder and no spouse or partner present, and 31.4% were households with a female householder and no spouse or partner present. About 30.6% of all households were made up of individuals and 13.2% had someone living alone who was 65 years of age or older. The average household size was 2.39. There were 1,247 families (60.7% of all households).

There were 2,743 housing units at an average density of 89.7 units per square mile (34.6 units/km^{2}), of which 2,056 (75.0%) were occupied. Of occupied units, 51.1% were owner-occupied and 48.9% were occupied by renters. 25.0% of housing units were vacant. The homeowner vacancy rate was 3.4% and the rental vacancy rate was 7.4%.

=== Income and poverty ===
In 2023, the US Census Bureau estimated that the median household income was $39,876, and the per capita income was $29,587. About 25.1% of families and 29.1% of the population were below the poverty line.

=== 2010 census ===
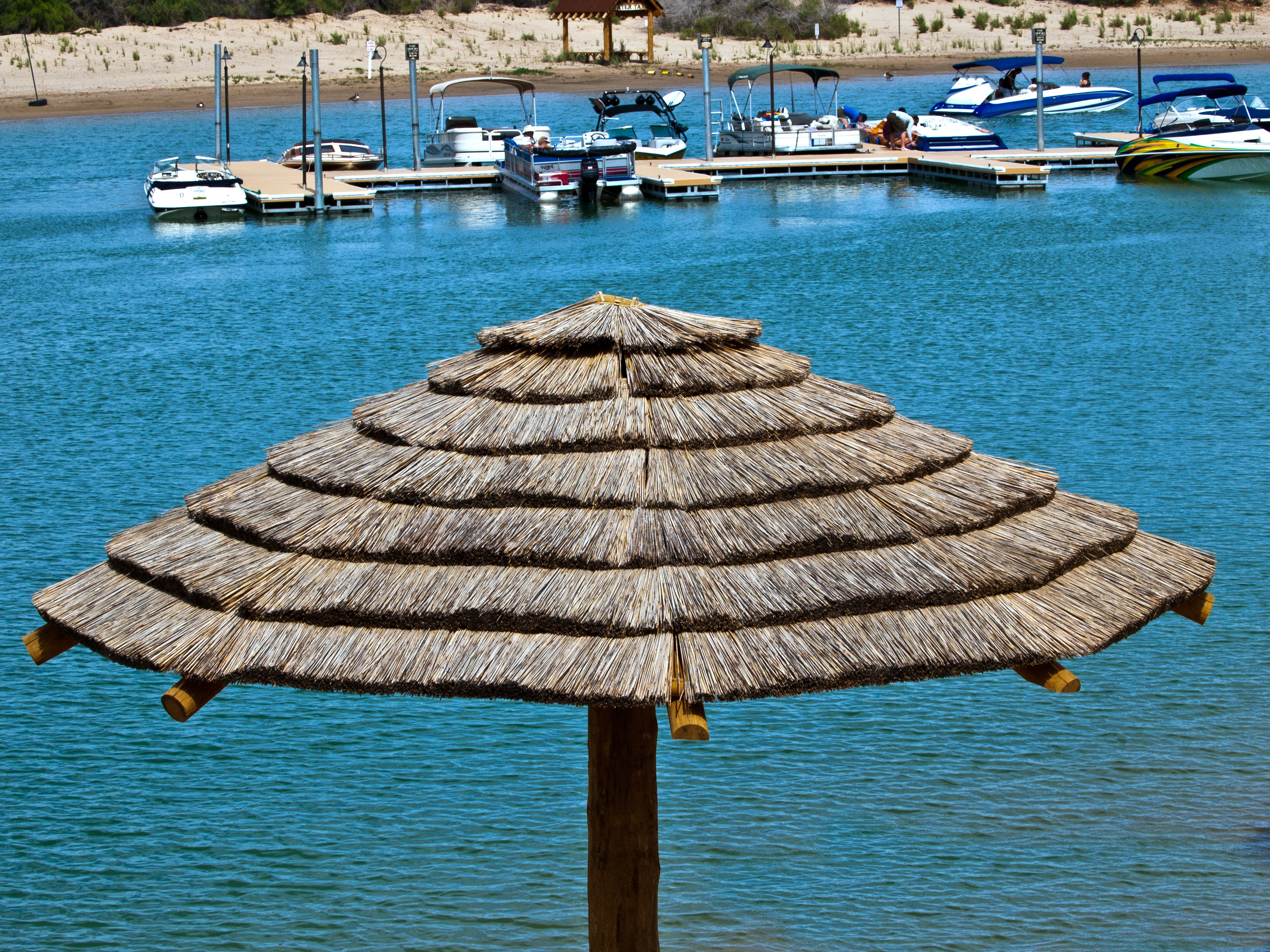
The Pirate Cove Resort

The 2010 United States census reported that Needles had a population of 4,844. The population density was 154.9 inhabitants per square mile (59.8/km^{2}). The racial makeup of Needles was 3,669 (75.7%) White (65.4% Non-Hispanic White), 95 (2.0%) African American, 399 (8.2%) Native American, 35 (0.7%) Asian, 9 (0.2%) Pacific Islander, 323 (6.7%) from other races, and 314 (6.5%) from two or more races. Hispanic or Latino of any race were 1,083 persons (22.4%).

The Census reported that 4,839 people (99.9% of the population) lived in households, 5 (0.1%) lived in non-institutionalized group quarters, and 0 (0%) were institutionalized.

There were 1,918 households, out of which 650 (33.9%) had children under the age of 18 living in them, 712 (37.1%) were opposite-sex married couples living together, 331 (17.3%) had a female householder with no husband present, 159 (8.3%) had a male householder with no wife present. There were 186 (9.7%) unmarried opposite-sex partnerships, and 6 (0.3%) same-sex married couples or partnerships. 588 households (30.7%) were made up of individuals, and 238 (12.4%) had someone living alone who was 65 years of age or older. The average household size was 2.52. There were 1,202 families (62.7% of all households); the average family size was 3.12.

The population was spread out, with 1,283 people (26.5%) under the age of 18, 401 people (8.3%) aged 18 to 24, 1,038 people (21.4%) aged 25 to 44, 1,357 people (28.0%) aged 45 to 64, and 765 people (15.8%) who were 65 years of age or older. The median age was 39.3 years. For every 100 females, there were 101.6 males. For every 100 females age 18 and over, there were 95.0 males.

There were 2,895 housing units at an average density of 92.6 units per square mile (35.8 units/km^{2}), of which 1,015 (52.9%) were owner-occupied, and 903 (47.1%) were occupied by renters. The homeowner vacancy rate was 4.9%; the rental vacancy rate was 17.2%. 2,578 people (53.2% of the population) lived in owner-occupied housing units and 2,261 people (46.7%) lived in rental housing units.

According to the 2010 United States Census, Needles had a median household income of $29,613, with 28.8% of the population living below the poverty line.

== Government ==
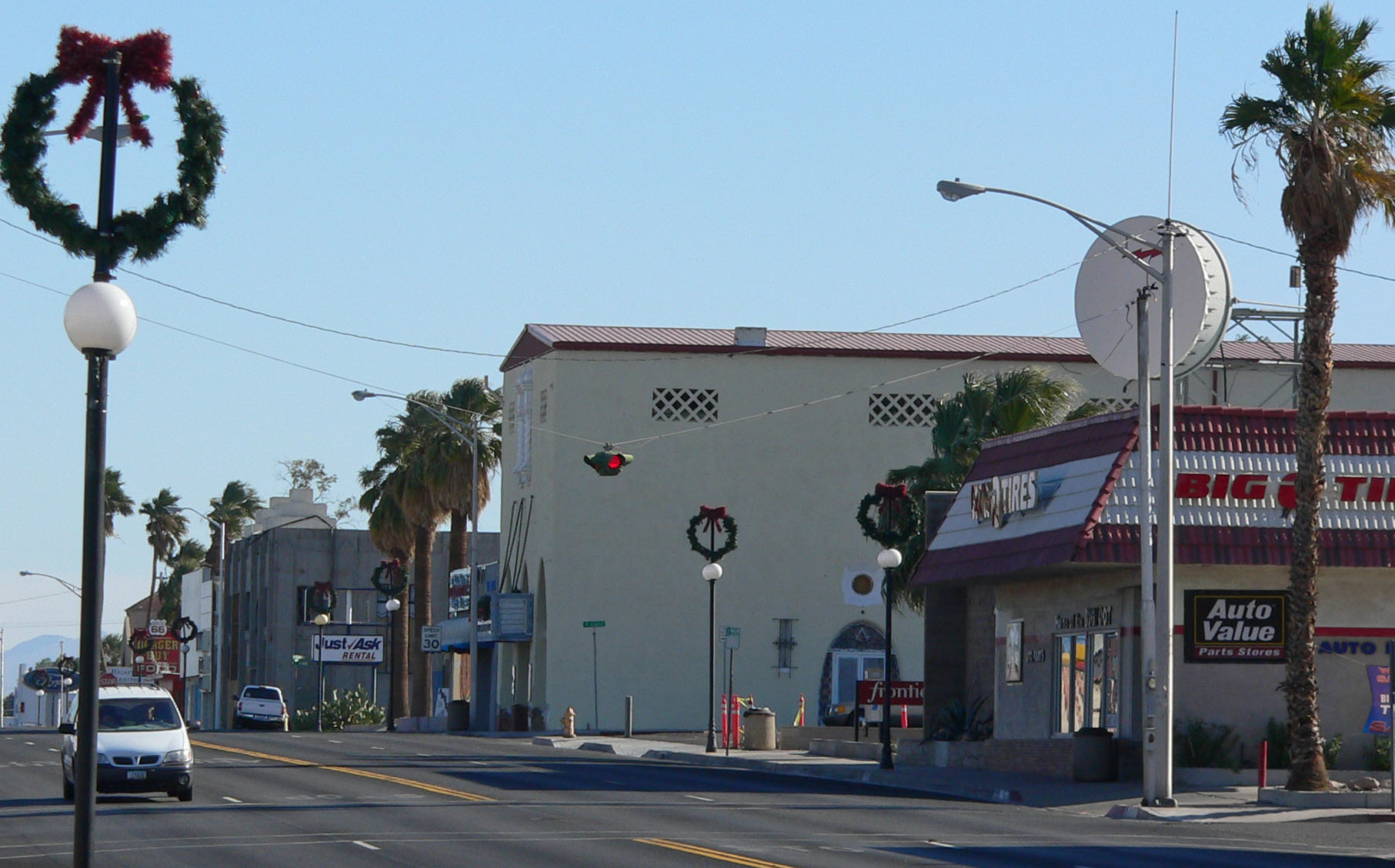
Broadway Street

The City of Needles was incorporated on October 30, 1913. It is a charter city, led by an elected mayor and a city council with six elected members. Mayors serve two-year terms of office, and councilmembers serve four-year terms. The council designates a vice mayor from among its members. The city council also appoints a city manager who is responsible for the operation of city departments. As of October 2023, the current city manager is Patrick J. Martinez.

=== State and federal representation ===
In the California State Legislature, Needles is in the 18th senatorial district, represented by Democrat Steve Padilla, and in the 36th Assembly district, represented by Republican Jeff Gonzalez.

In the United States House of Representatives, Needles is in California's 25th congressional district, represented by Democrat Raul Ruiz.

=== Proposals for secession ===
In 2008, claiming the county had been unwilling to help keep the city's troubled hospital open as a full-service medical facility, the city considered seceding from California and becoming part of neighboring Nevada, only a few miles away. The options of attaching itself to the state of Arizona or even forming a new county were also considered. Proposals to change states would require approval from the United States Congress and both state legislatures.

== Education ==
The city is in the Needles Unified School District. Needles' elementary schools and Needles High School are part of the district. The school district is one of the largest in the United States by area, with almost 6,000 square miles (16,000 km^{2}) in its boundaries. The district runs from Amboy to Needles, and south to Parker Dam. As of 2022, it had 955 students enrolled.

The local Needles schools include Katie Hohstadt Elementary School, formerly called 'D' Street School (new home of Needles Head Start, and no longer a regular public school), Vista Colorado Elementary School (grades K–5), Needles Middle School (grades 6–8), Needles High School (grades 9–12), and the Educational Training Center (grades 9–12). Needles High School, due to its distance from other California schools, is a member of the Nevada Interscholastic Activities Association, along with four other similarly placed California schools: Truckee, North Tahoe, South Tahoe, and Coleville.

Needles also has two private schools: the Needles Assembly of God Christian School and the Needles Seventh-day Adventist School.

== Infrastructure ==
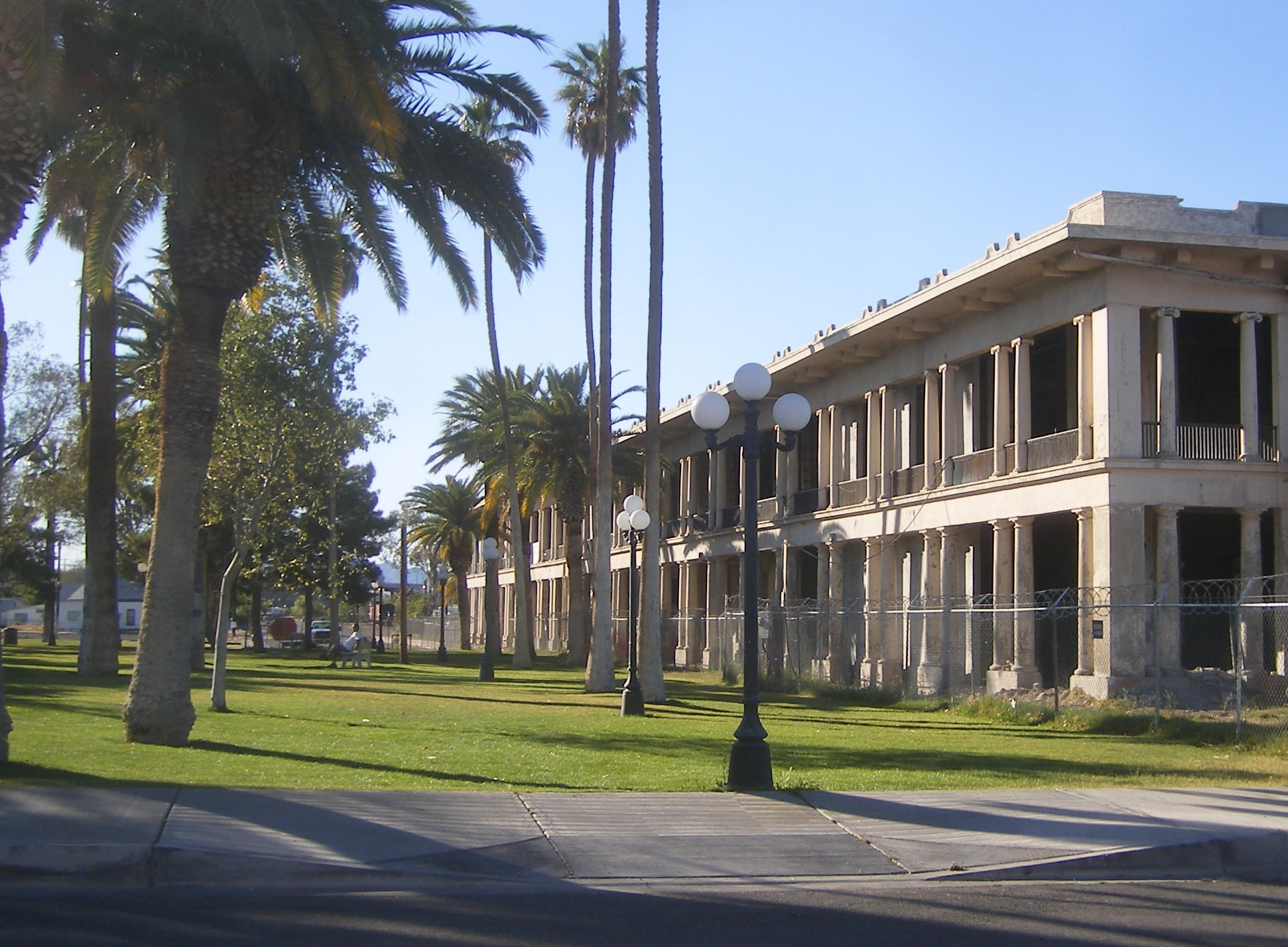
El Garcés Transportation Center

=== Transportation ===
Interstate 40, known locally as the Needles Freeway, is the major highway through Needles, connecting Barstow to the west and Arizona to the east. U.S. Route 95 also enters the city from the east on former Route 66 as a concurrency with the I-40 freeway, then splits with the Interstate west of the city, and heads north to Nevada. The Colorado River Bridge connects Needles directly with Arizona, via Mohave County and State Route 95.

Amtrak, the national passenger rail system, provides daily service to Needles station, operating its Southwest Chief between Chicago and Los Angeles. It arrives between midnight and 2 am.

Local transit service to the Needles area is provided by Needles Area Transit.

As of August 2, 2016, Victor Valley Transit Authority has service from Needles to Barstow and Victorville on Fridays. To Barstow and Victorville, the bus leaves at 6:15 and arrives at Victorville at 10:30 am. On the reverse trip, buses leave Victorville at 2:30 pm and arrives at Barstow at 7:15 pm.

Vegas Airporter provides service between Lake Havasu City, Needles, and Harry Reid International Airport in Las Vegas.

=== Public safety ===
On July 1, 2016, San Bernardino County Fire Department annexed the City of Needles. Fire Station 32 provides fire protection to the City of Needles and houses two Type 1 Engine companies, one Type 7 Engine company, one Water Tender and one 28-foot fireboat. The station is staffed full-time with career firefighters.

Since December 1989, the City of Needles has been patrolled by the San Bernardino County Sheriff's Department under the command of Captain Ross Tarangle from the Needles Patrol Station.

=== Health ===
Colorado Medical Center was once a full service hospital but at present it is functioning as an urgent care center.

== Notable people ==
- Pat Morris, Mayor of San Bernardino, California.
- Max Rafferty, Needles Superintendent of Schools, 1955–1961, became California Superintendent of Public Instruction 1962–1970.
- Charles Schulz, cartoonist of Peanuts, lived in Needles 1928–30 and made it the residence of Snoopy's brother Spike.
- Bess Houdini, wife and stage assistant of famed escape artist Harry Houdini, died in Needles in 1943.
- Yara tav, leader of the Mohave people (1861–1874), born close to the Needles rock formation before the establishment of the town.
- Alice Notley, American poet, grew up in Needles.
- Natalie Diaz, American poet and winner of the 2021 Pulitzer Prize for Poetry.
- Sam Kinison, American stand-up comedian, was killed in a car crash caused by a 17-year-old drunk driver, about 4.3 miles (6.9 kilometers) outside of Needles on April 10, 1992.

== In popular culture ==
=== Books ===
- In John Steinbeck's novel The Grapes of Wrath, the Joad family stops in Needles when they enter California on Route 66.
- Leslie Marmon Silko's novel Gardens in the Dunes is largely set in and around Needles in the late 19th century.

=== Print ===
- In the comic strip Peanuts, Snoopy's brother Spike lived in the desert outside Needles. He frequently heads to Needles to partake of the town's nightlife, often running afoul of the local coyotes.

=== Recordings ===
- In 2004, John Lowery (John 5), former guitarist for Marilyn Manson, released his CD Vertigo, in which the first track is entitled "Needles CA".
- The town is mentioned in the lyrics of Hoyt Axton's "Never Been to Spain"; the song was a hit for Three Dog Night in 1972 and was also performed by Elvis Presley and Waylon Jennings:

Well I never been to England, but I kinda like the Beatles. Well, I headed for Las Vegas, only made it out to Needles. Can you feel it? Must be real. It feels so good!

- Izzy Stradlin's 1999 album Ride On includes a track entitled "Needles" about his love of visiting the town.

=== Television ===
- In October 2006, two students and two teachers from Needles High School were invited to Washington, D.C. to meet with the Under Secretary of Defense, in which they spoke of the new program at Needles High School called MOCK National Security Workshop. The students were also interviewed for the nationwide, fifteen-minute television news show, Channel One News; the episode was aired on October 25.
- Needles was the main site of a 2009 UFO Hunters episode investigating a supposed UFO Crash.
- Needles High School was on a School Pride television episode on November 12, 2010.

=== Other connections ===
- In late 2000 to early 2001, skateboarder Tony Hawk donated $20,000 to the Needles Skate Park, which is still in use today. Hawk was present for the grand opening of the park in January 2004.
- Needles (and the surrounding area) was the scene for the hit 1988 post-apocalyptic computer RPG Wasteland.
- Murals were painted of U.S. Route 66, which passed through Needles on its way between Chicago and Los Angeles.
