= Outline of Nevada =

U.S. state

The flag of Nevada

The seal of Nevada

The location of the State of Nevada in the United States of America

The following outline is provided as an overview of and topical guide to the U.S. state of Nevada:

Nevada – U.S. state in the intermountain west region of the United States. Nevada is mostly desert or semiarid. Over two-thirds of Nevada's people live in the Las Vegas metropolitan area, and about 86% of the state's land is owned by the US government, under various departments and agencies.

== General reference ==
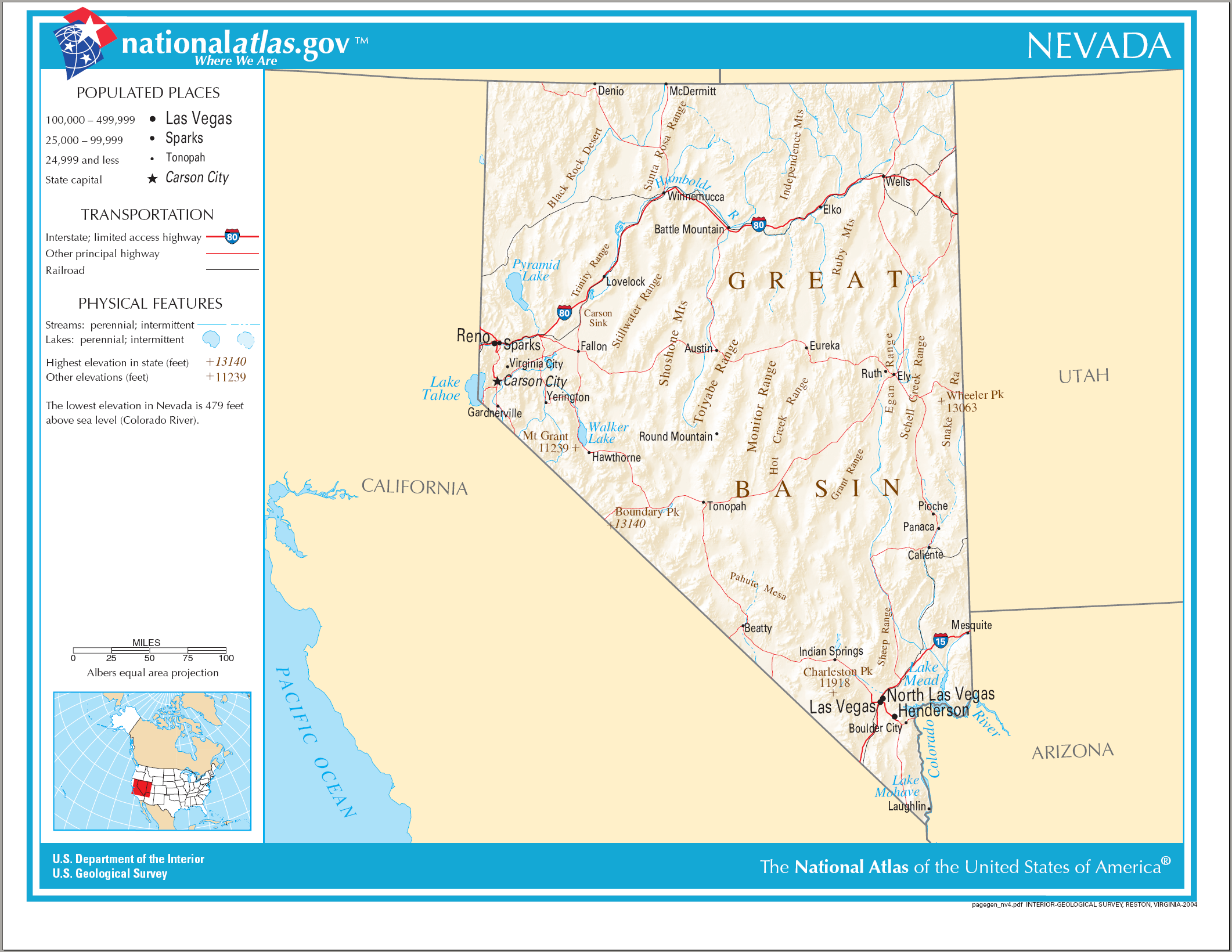
An enlargeable map of the State of Nevada

- Names
  - Common name: Nevada
    - Pronunciation: /nɪˈvædə/ niv-AD-ə
  - Official name: State of Nevada
  - Abbreviations and name codes
    - Postal symbol: NV
    - ISO 3166-2 code: US-NV
    - Internet second-level domain: .nv.us
  - Nicknames
    - Battle Born State (refers to the fact that Nevada joined the Union during the Civil War)
    - Sagebrush State
    - Silver State (formerly used on license plates)
- Adjectival: Nevada
- Demonyms
  - Nevadan
  - Nevadian

== Geography of Nevada ==
Geography of Nevada

- Nevada is: a U.S. state, a federal state of the United States of America
- Location
  - Northern Hemisphere
  - Western Hemisphere
    - Americas
      - North America
        - Anglo America
        - Northern America
          - United States of America
            - Contiguous United States
              - Western United States
                - Mountain West United States
                - Southwestern United States
- Population of Nevada: 2,700,551 (2010 U.S. Census)
- Area of Nevada: 110,573 sq mi (286,382 km^{2})
- Atlas of Nevada

=== Places in Nevada ===
- Historic places in Nevada
  - Ghost towns in Nevada
  - National Historic Landmarks in Nevada
  - National Register of Historic Places listings in Nevada
    - Bridges on the National Register of Historic Places in Nevada
- National Natural Landmarks in Nevada
- National parks in Nevada
- State parks in Nevada

=== Environment of Nevada ===
Environment of Nevada

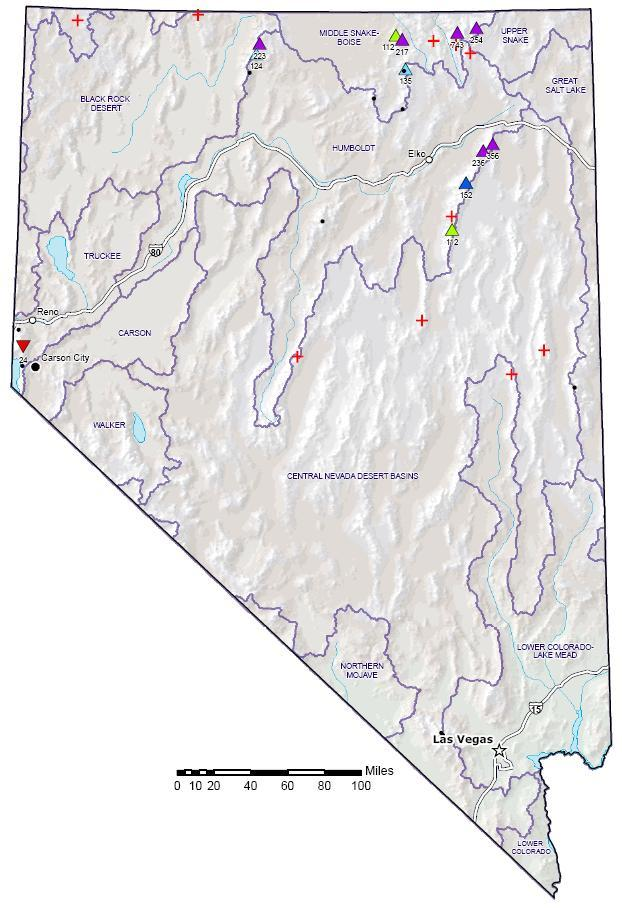
An enlargeable map of the state of Nevada

- Climate of Nevada
- Superfund sites in Nevada
- Wildlife of Nevada
  - Fauna of Nevada
    - Birds of Nevada

==== Natural geographic features of Nevada ====
- Mountain ranges of Nevada
- Rivers of Nevada
- Valleys of Nevada

=== Regions of Nevada ===
- Southern Nevada
- Western Nevada

==== Administrative divisions of Nevada ====
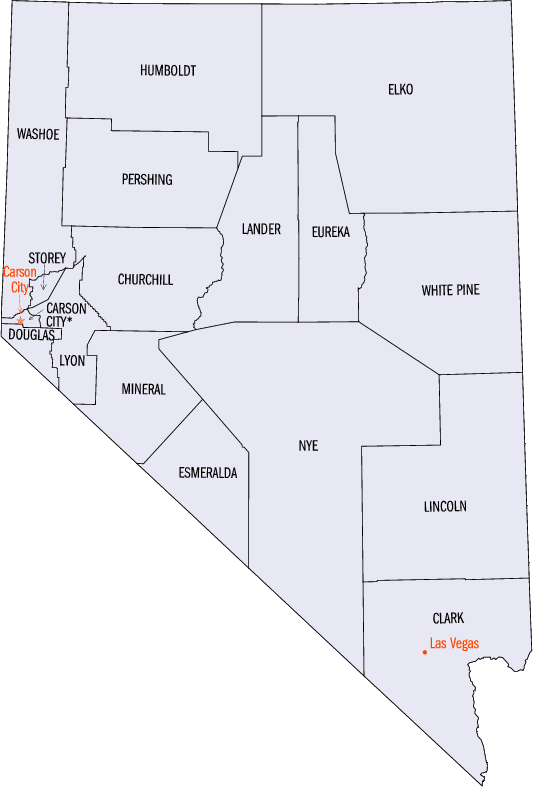
An enlargeable map of the 16 counties and 1 independent city of the state of Nevada

- The 16 counties and 1 independent city of the state of Nevada
  - Municipalities in Nevada
    - Cities in Nevada
      - State capital of Nevada: Carson City
      - Largest city in Nevada: Las Vegas (24th most populous city in the United States)
      - City nicknames in Nevada

=== Demography of Nevada ===
Demographics of Nevada

== Government and politics of Nevada ==
Politics of Nevada

- Form of government: U.S. state government
- Nevada's congressional delegations
- Nevada State Capitol
- Political party strength in Nevada

=== Branches of the government of Nevada ===
Government of Nevada

==== Executive branch of the government of Nevada ====
- Governor of Nevada
  - Lieutenant Governor of Nevada
  - Secretary of State of Nevada
  - State Treasurer of Nevada
- State departments
  - Nevada Department of Transportation
- State agencies
  - Nevada Athletic Commission
  - Nevada Gaming Commission
  - Nevada Gaming Control Board

==== Legislative branch of the government of Nevada ====
- Nevada Legislature (bicameral)
  - Upper house: Nevada Senate
  - Lower house: Nevada Assembly

==== Judicial branch of the government of Nevada ====
Courts of Nevada

- Supreme Court of Nevada

=== Law and order in Nevada ===
Law of Nevada

- Cannabis in Nevada
- Capital punishment in Nevada
  - Individuals executed in Nevada
- Constitution of Nevada
- Crime in Nevada
- Gun laws in Nevada
- Law enforcement in Nevada
  - Law enforcement agencies in Nevada
    - Nevada Highway Patrol
- Same-sex marriage in Nevada
- Grazing rights in Nevada

=== Military in Nevada ===
- Nevada Air National Guard
- Nevada Army National Guard

== History of Nevada ==
History of Nevada

=== History of Nevada, by period ===
- Prehistory of Nevada
- Indigenous peoples
  - Paiute
    - Wovoka
      - Ghost Dance
  - Washo
- Spanish colony of Alta California, 1804–1821
  - Adams–Onis Treaty of 1819
- Mexican War of Independence, September 16, 1810 – August 24, 1821
  - Treaty of Córdoba, August 24, 1821
- Mexican territory of Alta California, 1821–1848
  - California Trail, 1841–1869
- Mexican–American War, April 25, 1846 – February 2, 1848
  - Treaty of Guadalupe Hidalgo, February 2, 1848
- Unorganized territory of the United States, 1848–1850
  - State of Deseret (extralegal), 1849–1850
  - Compromise of 1850
- Territory of Utah east of California border from 37th parallel north to 42nd parallel north, (1850–1866)–1896
  - Comstock Lode, 1858–1878
  - Paiute War, 1860
  - Pony Express, 1860–1861
  - American Civil War, April 12, 1861 – May 13, 1865
    - Nevada in the American Civil War
  - First Transcontinental Telegraph completed 1861
- Territory of New Mexico south of 37th parallel north, (1850–1863)–1912
- Territory of Nevada between California border and 39th meridian west from Washington from 37th parallel north to 42nd parallel north, 1861–1864
  - Nevada in the American Civil War, 1861–1865
- Territory of Arizona south of 37th parallel north, (1863–1867)–1912
- State of Nevada becomes 36th State admitted to the United States of America on October 31, 1864
  - Utah annexation, 1866
  - Arizona annexation, 1867
  - First transcontinental railroad completed 1869
  - Hoover Dam completed 1936
  - Great Basin National Park established on October 27, 1986
  - Death Valley National Park designated on October 31, 1994

=== History of Nevada, by region ===
- By city
  - History of Boulder City
  - History of Carson City
  - History of Las Vegas
  - History of Virginia City

=== History of Nevada, by subject ===
- List of Nevada state legislatures
- Territorial evolution of Nevada

== Culture of Nevada ==
Culture of Nevada

- Museums in Nevada
- Religion in Nevada
  - The Church of Jesus Christ of Latter-day Saints in Nevada
  - Episcopal Diocese of Nevada
- Scouting in Nevada
- State symbols of Nevada
  - Flag of the State of Nevada
  - Great Seal of the State of Nevada

=== The Arts in Nevada ===
- Music of Nevada

=== Sports in Nevada ===
Sports in Nevada

== Economy and infrastructure of Nevada ==
Economy of Nevada

- Communications in Nevada
  - Newspapers in Nevada
  - Radio stations in Nevada
  - Television stations in Nevada
- Energy in Nevada
  - List of power stations in Nevada
  - Solar power in Nevada
  - Wind power in Nevada
- Health care in Nevada
  - Hospitals in Nevada
- Mining in Nevada
  - Gold mining in Nevada
  - Silver mining in Nevada
- Transportation in Nevada
  - Airports in Nevada

== Education in Nevada ==
Education in Nevada

- Schools in Nevada
  - School districts in Nevada
    - High schools in Nevada
  - Colleges and universities in Nevada
    - University of Nevada
    - UNLV

== See also ==
- Topic overview:
  - Nevada
  - Index of Nevada-related articles
