= NadaDada =

NadaDada is a group of artists who came to recognition in 2007 with the first Dada Motel Exhibit centered at the historic El Cortez Hotel in Reno, Nevada. Like the Beat Generation, The Bloomsbury Group or the earlier Transcendentalism movement, the artists of NadaDada routinely portray in their work cultural circumstances that they helped to inspire. Common themes in their art include alienation, apocalypse, sexuality, absolute freedom, and revolution against the politics of art. Though NadaDada finds meaning in the anti-bourgeois phenomena of Dadaism, which began in Switzerland during World War I, NadaDada represents an even further negation of the negation of Dada. Thus the obsession with the gallery setting. NadaDada artists adhere to the credo that “the absurd holds no terror, and the art a cry for help.”

== History ==
NadaDada began in the fall of 2006 when a group of six artists from Reno, Nevada met to discuss and organize a group of art exhibitions with as little structure and as few rules as possible. By 2009, the number of participants had grown to 150 and by 2013 had included 350. The intention of the group was for simultaneous exhibitions to happen in a series of seedy hotels and motels in Reno’s downtown district, inviting artists to turn each room into its own art exhibition, direct and without bureaucracy.

Original founding artists include Jeff Johnson, Chad Sorg, Dianna Sion, Ann O’Lear, Esther Dunaway, and Tova Ramos. Inspired in part by the anarchic spectacle of the Burning Man festival that occurs each year in the Blackrock Desert north of Reno, and in part by what was perceived as the confining bureaucracy of Reno’s yearly series of corporate-sponsored cultural events known as Reno's Artown, the founders set out to create a collective artistic experience in which artists could participate regardless of discipline or medium and without competition or jurying. According to the NadaDada Facebook page, there are “no curators, no rules, no juries, no bullshit, not art.”"

== Development ==
In 2007, it was named Dada Motel but evolved, in name, to “Nada Motel,” “NadaDada Motel”, and is now simply known as “NadaDada.” Although NadaDada lacks any central administration by design, except the designed administration for which to administer the paperwork, NadaDada exhibitions continue each year in June in Reno, Nevada and artists continue to work together in a spirit of voluntary association, mutual aid, direct action and autonomy. "Each artist is autonomous from the other, though some collaborate, many times spontaneously."

In 2009, The New York Times covered the NadaDada Motel, comparing its role in Reno to that of the Venice Biennale and Art Basel, and characterizing it as an "unpretentious art event" that provides space for unconventional works. In addition to the annual exhibition in Reno, participating artists have displayed their work at external venues, including the Marjorie Barrick Museum in Las Vegas and at the Los Angeles Center for Digital Art.

Though boasting a strong internet presence in addition to previously mentioned museum exhibitions in other cities, the art-in-motel-rooms event has yet to successfully take seed outside the city limits of Reno, Nevada. Event "(dis) Organizers" are hopeful for the movement's expansion.
