= Marjorie Barrick =

Marjorie Jacobsen Barrick
- Born: October 9, 1917; Iowa, USA
- Died: April 29, 2007 (aged 89); Las Vegas, Nevada
- Education: Creighton University, Omaha, NE
- Occupation: Philanthropist
- Spouse: Edward Barrick

Marjorie Ann Jacobson (October 9, 1917 – April 29, 2007) was a founding member of the University of Nevada, Las Vegas Foundation Board of Trustees. She was born in Iowa in 1917.

== Education ==
She pursued economics at Creighton University. She graduated in 1940 with a bachelor's degree in business administration.

== Career ==
She married Edward Barrick in 1947. They moved to Las Vegas in 1951. Ms. Barrick took classes at what was then Nevada Southern University, later to become the University of Nevada, Las Vegas.

Following her husband's death in 1979, Barrick founded, in his name, the Barrick Lecture Series at the University of Nevada, Las Vegas with an endowment of over $1.2 million in 1980.

She also founded the Barrick Graduate Fellowship, Barrick Faculty Development and Travel Fund, and the Barrick Research Scholars Fund. Barrick also endowed The Barrick Scholar Awards to recognize faculty members of the University of Nevada, Las Vegas.

In 1989 the university renamed its museum of Natural History Marjorie Barrick Museum of Natural History in honor of Ms. Barrick. In 2017 it renamed the museum Marjorie Barrick Museum of Art.

== Accolades ==
- Named a Distinguished Nevadan by the Board of Regents of the University of Nevada in 1982.
- 1987 Governor's Arts Award for Distinguished Service to the Arts.
- "Woman of the Year" award from Nevada Dance Theater in 1988.
- Received an honorary doctorate of Humane Letters from UNLV in 1995.
