= List of bridges on the National Register of Historic Places in Nevada =

This is a list of bridges and tunnels on the National Register of Historic Places in the U.S. state of Nevada.

| Name | Image | Built | Listed | Location | County | Type |
|---|---|---|---|---|---|---|
| Clark Avenue Railroad Underpass | Clark Avenue Railroad Underpass | 1936 | 2004-01-28 | Las Vegas; 36°10′38″N 115°8′35″W | Clark | |
| Homestake Mine | | 1850–1924 | 1985-07-17 | Searchlight | Clark | Silver mine |
| Humboldt River Bridge | | 1910 | 1995-03-30 | Winnemucca; 40°58′35″N 117°44′17″W | Humboldt | concrete arch-deck bridge |
| Virginia Street Bridge | | 1905 | 1980-12-10 | Reno; 39°31′30.14″N 119°48′45.33″W | Washoe | two-span bridge |
