= Marjorie Barrick Museum of Art =

Museum at University of Nevada, Las Vegas

- Location in Nevada Marjorie Barrick Museum of Art (the United States)
- Established: 1967; 59 years ago
- Location: 4505 Maryland Parkway; UNLV campus, Paradise, Las Vegas NV USA
- Coordinates: 36.107696°N 115.137393°W
- Type: Contemporary Art
- Website: barrickmuseum.unlv.edu/

The Marjorie Barrick Museum of Art (MSM; formerly known as the Marjorie Barrick Museum of Natural History) is a museum located on the main campus of the University of Nevada, Las Vegas (UNLV), established in 1967. The museum was originally instituted as a natural history museum with a focus on the natural history and environment of Nevada and the broader Southwestern United States. In December 2011, the Barrick joined the UNLV College of Fine Arts and became the anchor of the Galleries at UNLV. The six galleries and one museum that make up the Galleries are each entities in their own right linked via a common administration.

== History ==
The founding of a natural history museum at the university—then an institution only a decade old, known as Nevada Southern University—began with a collection of specimens from the Desert Research Institute (DRI), the Nevada System of Higher Education's graduate research institute. In September 1967, the DRI opened a small museum facility in premises across from the university's grounds, as part of an expansion of DRI's activities into southern Nevada. The museum was created under the direction of archaeologist Richard H. Brooks, assistant research professor at the university and a researcher (later director) of the DRI-affiliated Nevada Archaeological Survey. Its exhibits consisted of DRI's local collection of living desert animal specimens and Native American artifacts.

In 1969 the university took over the management of the museum from DRI. Brooks remained as director of the university-affiliated museum, and during his tenure, the museum's funding was established and further permanent exhibits acquired. The most significant acquisition occurred in 1979, when a private collection of pre-Columbian art was donated by a former UNLV alumna, Mannetta Braunstein, and her husband Michael. These pieces would form the basis of a broadening collection of Mesoamerican and Aridoamerican cultural artifacts, acquired through other donations and further additions from the Braunsteins' purchases in Latin American markets.

In the late 1970s, the museum began the process of relocating to premises situated on the UNLV campus, to occupy a building that had contained the university's original gymnasium. Renovations to accommodate the museum were completed in 1981. Further alterations and expansions to the building were subsequently undertaken, and a research laboratory wing was added in 1994.

Beginning in 1979 the museum's anthropological collections were greatly expanded, with the subsequent additions of donated collections of ethnographic and archaeological artifacts representing Native American and pre-Columbian Mesoamerican cultures.

Brooks left the position in 1981. His successor as museum director was ornithologist and former UNLV president (1973–78) Donald Baepler, who was returning to the university campus after a three-year term as chancellor of the Nevada university system. Baepler was instrumental in establishing UNLV's Harry Reid Environmental Research Center, and the museum was reorganized to become one of the center's operating divisions. Baepler retired as museum director in 2004, retained a title as emeritus executive director of the museum.

In 1989 the museum was renamed in honor of Marjorie Barrick, a longstanding benefactor of the university. In 1980 Barrick, a prominent philanthropist married to a Las Vegas real estate developer, had gifted UNLV with an endowment of some $1.2 million from her late husband's estate, to fund an ongoing series of public lectures at the university. Speakers at the Barrick Lecture Series have included international figures and heads of state, such as Jimmy Carter, Gerald Ford, Mikhail Gorbachev and F. W. de Klerk.

In 2011, the Barrick closed its doors to undergo a change of hands with departments. The museum ceased to be affiliated with the Harry Reid Center and Department of Archaeology and became a part of the College of Fine Arts at UNLV. It reopened in 2012 as a contemporary art museum after undergoing drastic renovations, from its Collections Room to the Exhibition Hall, which changed how the public was able to interact with the space from piece to piece.

After the Las Vegas Art Museum (or LVAM) closed its doors in 2009, their collection was left without a home. In 2012 the LVAM collection moved to the newly renovated Barrick Museum, as part of a partnership between LVAM and UNLV.

In 2017, the Marjorie Barrick Museum of Art celebrated its 50th anniversary. Under the direction of curator and artist, Alisha Kerlin, the museum was "rebranded" with "'of Art'" being added to its name.

Since 2017, the Barrick has partnered with Clark County School District to increase access to K-12 students, with the Barrick often acting as their introductory experience to a museum. In 2020, the Barrick announced its partnership with the Las Vegas Womxn of Color Arts Festival, a Southern Nevada collective that aims to increase opportunities and visibility for “local womxn [sic] artists who are Black, Indigenous, and People of Color.”

Currently, the Marjorie Barrick Museum of Art is Las Vegas' only art museum.

== Collections ==
The Collections at the Marjorie Barrick Museum of Art include:

- The Barrick Art Collection

–The bulk of the works in the collection include artists with ties to the greater Las Vegas valley forming a heritage collection of works created in and inspired by the Southern Nevada region.

- The Barrick Cultural Collection

–The cultural collection began to form in 1969 and includes cultural objects from the American Southwest and Mesoamerica. The Pre-Columbian collection was initiated in 1979 with a gift from Dr. Michael C. and Mannetta Braunstein. Today, the museum's holdings include the Dr. Michael C. and Mannetta Braunstein Collection, a comprehensive collection of Pre-Columbian objects from nearly every culture of Pre-Columbian Latin America, as well as Mexican dance masks and retablos; Guatemalan, Bolivian, and Navajo textiles; Paiute and Hopi basketry; and Navajo jewelry. A variety of methodologies have been used at different times to collect, classify, analyze, and describe collection material, and the collections provide rich primary source information for multi-, cross-, and interdisciplinary studies.

- The LVAM Collection

–Works in the collection include national and international artists such as Llyn Foulkes and William T. Wiley, as well as a significant representation of UNLV graduates.

- The Vogel Collection

–The Barrick Museum houses the Dorothy and Herbert Vogel 50x50 Collection. In 2010, UNLV was the recipient of 50 contemporary works from the collectors. Beginning in 1962, New York postal clerk, Herbert Vogel, and his librarian wife, Dorothy, began collecting contemporary works of art. The couple dedicated all of Herb's salary to buying art, and in a few decades had amassed a collection encompassing some 4,000 works. The couple developed a program to gift 50 works to one institution in each of the 50 states. This program became known as Vogel 50x50. The collection includes the work by such notables as Stephen Antonakos, Neil Jenney, Lynda Benglis, Lucio Pozzi, Edda Renouf, Bettina Werner and Richard Tuttle.

== Exhibitions ==
Exhibitions at the Marjorie Barrick of Art include:

- 2020
- Lance L. Smith: In the Interest of Action
- FUTURE RELICS: Artifacts for a New World
- Yerman: Peaks & Valleys
- Excerpts: Works from the Marjorie Barrick Museum of Art
- Nevada Touring Initiative Exhibition: Still Here Now
- Ashley Hairston Doughty: Kept to Myself
- The Other Side of Paradise
- Mikayla Whitmore: Between a Rock and a Cliff
- 2019
- Stars on the Ground: Works by John Torreano
- Connective Tissue by Amanda Phingbodhipakkiya
- Zet Gold: On My Mountain
- Dry Wit
- Justin Favela and Ramiro Gomez: Sorry for the Mess
- Human Contact, curated by Samantha Castle
- Tiger and The Eternal Struggle
- Axis Mundo: Queer Networks in Chicano L.A.
- 2018
- Jubilation Inflation
- Soundscapes
- Art in Context
- Andrew Schoultz: In Process: Every Movement Counts
- Exhibition: Identity Tapestry
- Exhibition: VESSEL: Ceramics of Ancient West Mexico
- Exhibition: Plural
- 2017
- Peripheral Flood Control Structures of Las Vegas
- Preservation
- liminal
- Tested Ground
- Casey Roberts
- Astronomy of the Asphalt Ecliptic
- Play On Gary, Play On
- Josh Azzarella Screenings
- Abandon All Hope, Ye Who Enter Here
- Process, curated by Matthew Gardocki
- Masking, curated by Karen Roop
- 2016
- Edward Burtynsky: Oil
- In Transition: Female Figurines from the Michael C. and Mannetta Braunstein Collection
- Showing the Need for Connection
- Five
- Ellsworth Kelly
- Unseen Selections from LVAM
- Teaching Gallery Staff Picks
- 2015
- Break Ups & Tear Downs
- Style Moderne: Art Glass from the Ruth and Mel Wolzinger Collection
- Recent Acquisitions
- The Dorothy and Herbert Vogel Collection
- David Sanchez Burr: Citizen Speak
- Deborah Aschheim: Kennedy Obsession
- John Millei: If 6 Turned Out To Be 9, Selected Work
- 2014
- Reflecting & Projecting: 20 Years of Design Excellence
- Yesterday & Today
- Panorama
- Panorama+ Sesquicentennial Celebration of Nevada: Further Selections from the Nevada Arts Council's Artist Fellowship Program
- Jerry Lewis: Painted Pictures
- Sound & Video Installation: Derivative Presence by Yasmina Chavez & Javier Sanchez
- Private/Public: Images of Devotion from 19th and Early 20th Century Mexico Opening
- Art for Art's Sake: Selections from the Frederick R. Weisman Art Foundation
- 2013
- Passage to the Future: Art from a New Generation in Japan
- The Dorothy and Herbert Vogel Collection
- The Kent Bicentennial Portfolio: Spirit of Independence
- Pre-Columbian Sacrifice: The Burden of the Elite

== Facilities ==
- Marjorie Barrick Museum Auditorium
- Marjorie Barrick Museum Exhibition Hall
