= Humboldt River Bridge (Bridge Street, Winnemucca, Nevada) =

- U.S. National Register of Historic Places
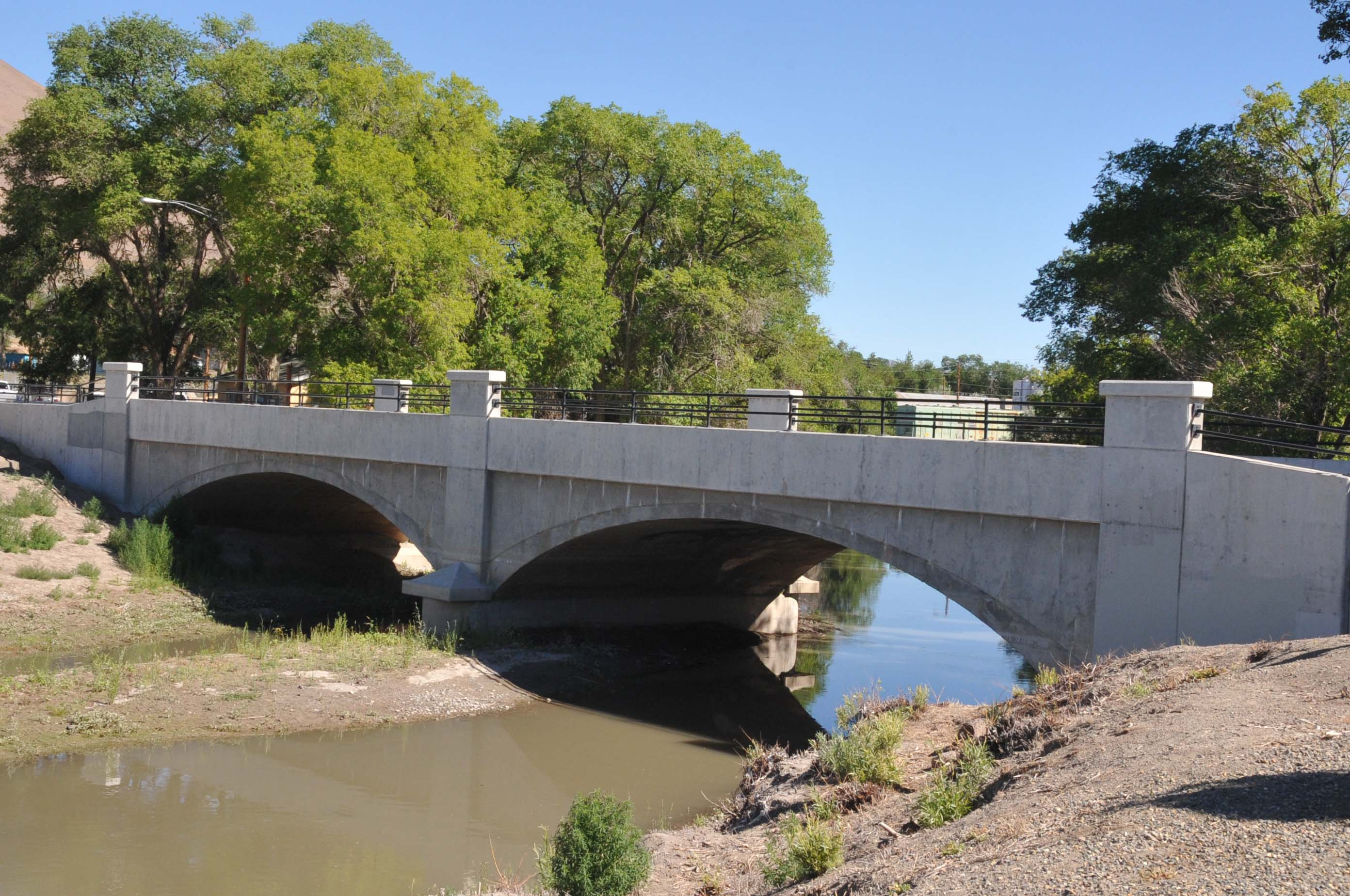

- Location within Nevada Location within the United States
- Location: N. Bridge St., over the Humboldt R., Winnemucca, Nevada
- Coordinates: 40°58′35″N 117°44′17″W
- Area: less than one acre
- Built: 1910
- Architect: Nickerson, George S.
- Architectural style: concrete arch-deck bridge
- NRHP reference No.: 95000322
- Added to NRHP: March 30, 1995

The Humboldt River Bridge is a concrete arch bridge across the Humboldt River in Winnemucca, Nevada, United States, that was built in 1910. It is 130 feet (40 m) long and was the first reinforced concrete arch-deck bridge built in the county. It is significant as one of the last pair of such bridges surviving in Nevada, and also for association with economic expansion of Winnemucca in the early 20th century.

It was designed by engineer George S. Nickerson.

The bridge was listed on the National Register of Historic Places in 1995.
