= Geography of Nevada =

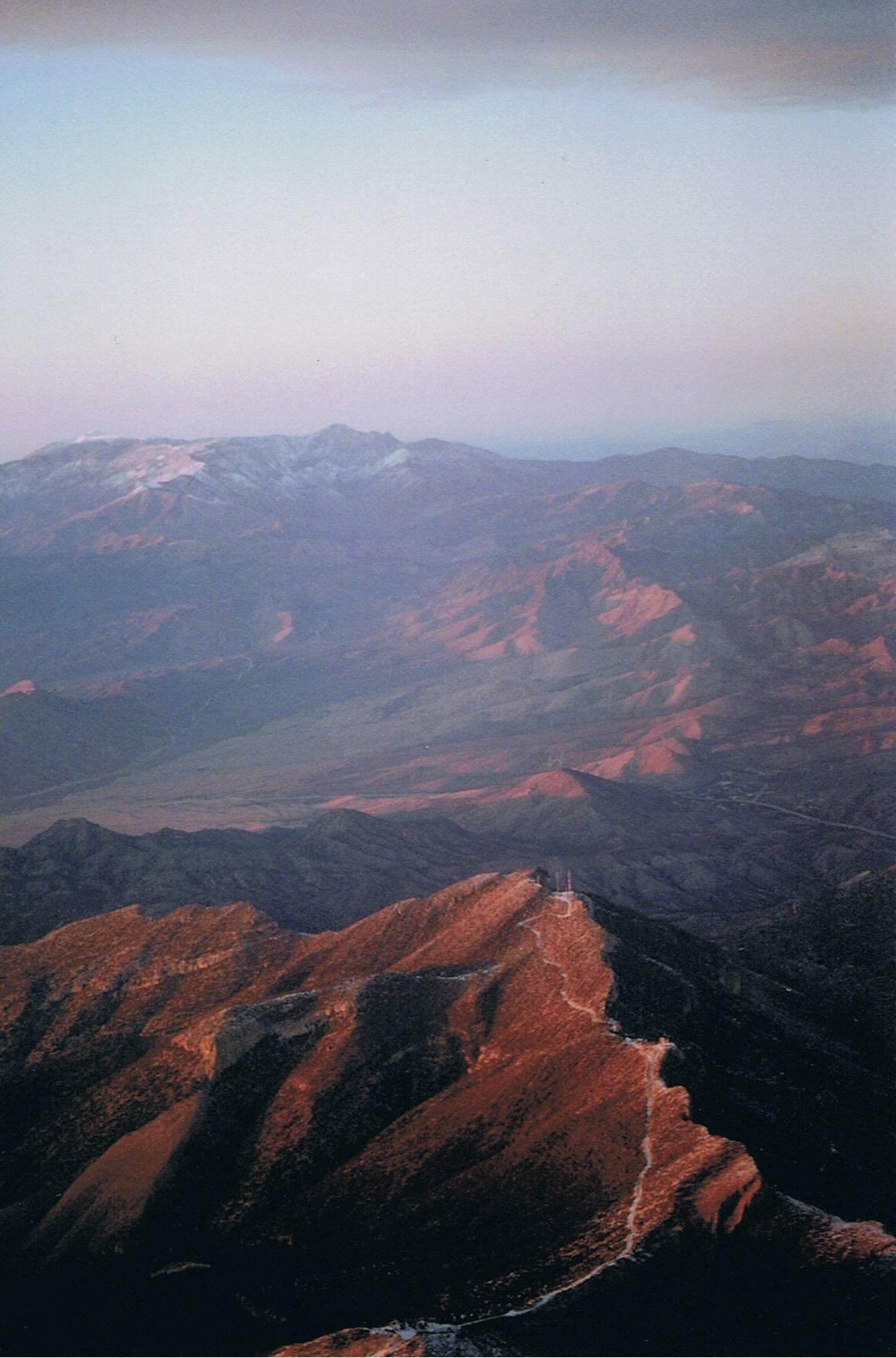
Mountains west of Las Vegas in the Mojave Desert

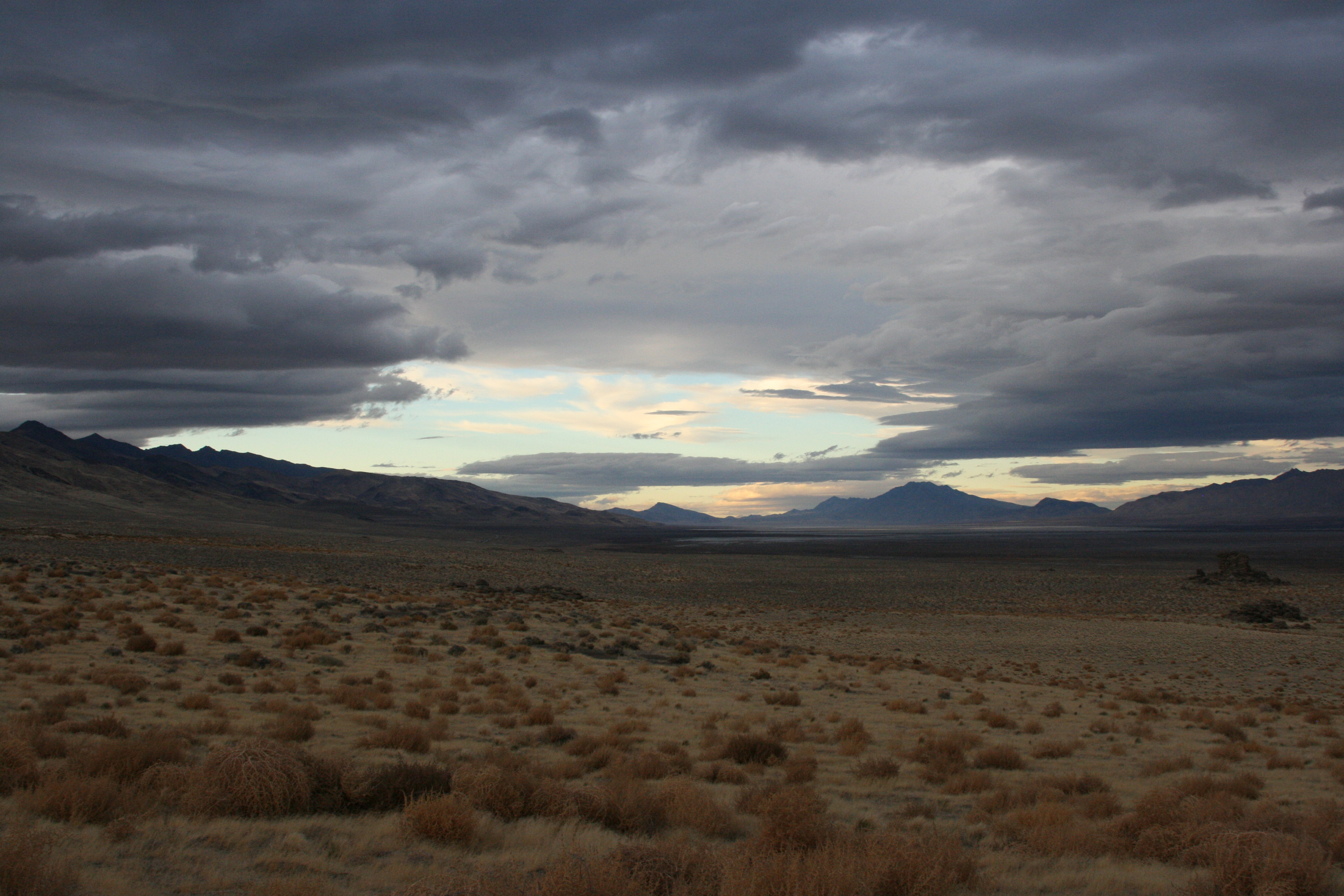
A valley near Pyramid Lake

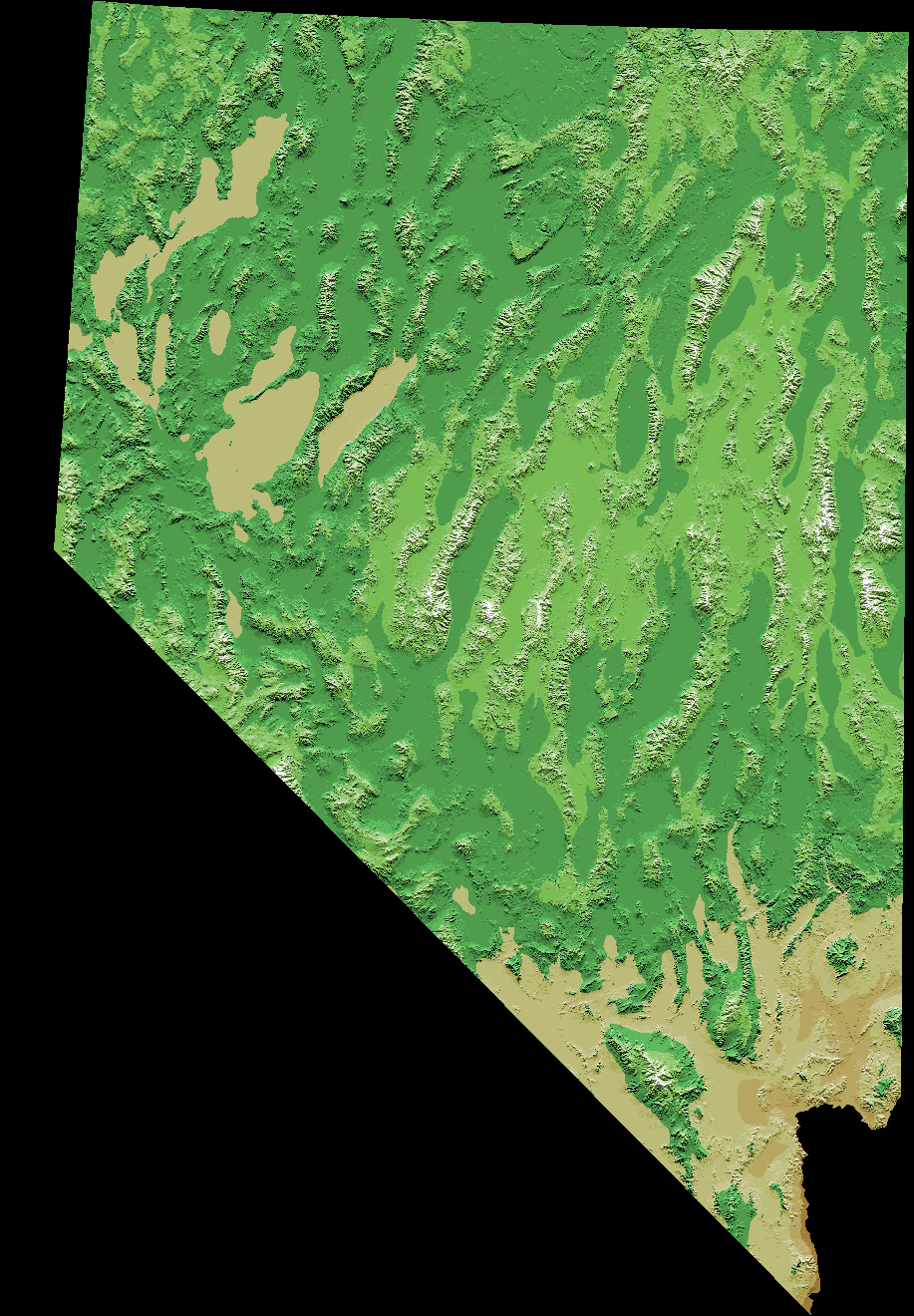
Topographic map of Nevada

The landlocked U.S. state of Nevada has a varied geography and is almost entirely within the Basin and Range Province and is broken up by many north–south mountain ranges. Most of these ranges have endorheic valleys between them.

== Overview ==
Much of the northern part of the state is within the Great Basin, a mild desert that experiences hot temperatures in the summer and cold temperatures in the winter. Occasionally, moisture from the Arizona Monsoon will cause summer thunderstorms; Pacific storms may blanket the area with snow. The state's highest recorded temperature was 125 °F (52 °C) in Laughlin (elevation of 605 feet or 184 meters) on June 29, 1994. The coldest recorded temperature was −52 °F (−47 °C) set in San Jacinto in 1972, in the northeastern portion of the state.

The Humboldt River crosses the state from east to west across the northern part of the state, draining into the Humboldt Sink near Lovelock. Several rivers drain from the Sierra Nevada eastward, including the Walker, Truckee, and Carson rivers. All of these rivers are endorheic basins, ending in Walker Lake, Pyramid Lake, and the Carson Sink, respectively. However, not all of Nevada is within the Great Basin. Tributaries of the Snake River drain the far north, while the Colorado River, which also forms much of the boundary with Arizona, drains much of southern Nevada.

The mountain ranges, some of which have peaks above 13,000 feet (4,000 m), harbor lush forests high above desert plains, creating sky islands for endemic species. The valleys are often no lower in elevation than 3,000 feet (910 m), while some in central Nevada are above 6,000 feet (1,800 m).

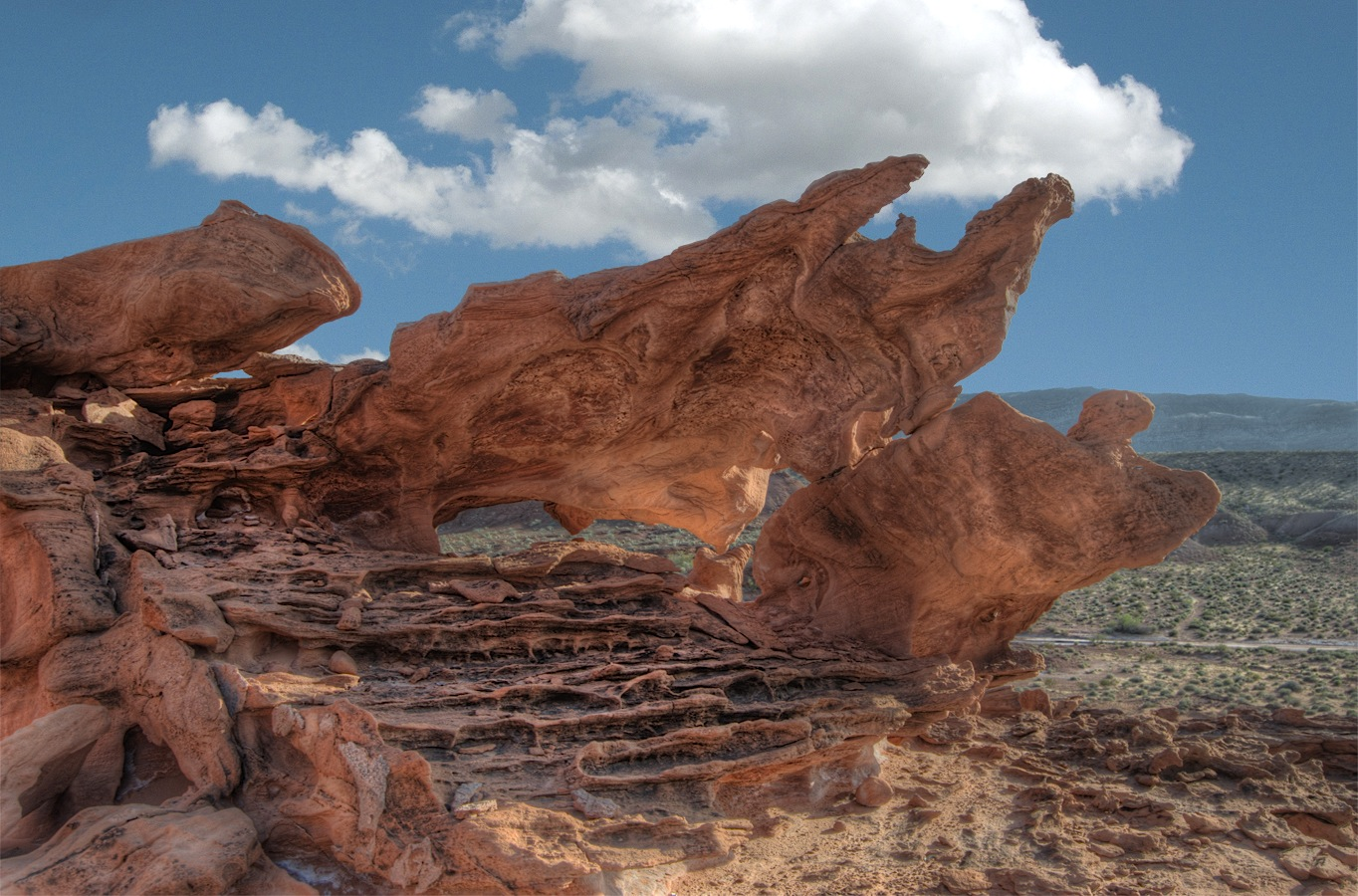
Little Finland rock formation in Nevada

The southern third of the state, where the Las Vegas area is situated, is within the Mojave Desert. The area receives less rain in the winter but is closer to the Arizona Monsoon in the summer. The terrain is also lower, mostly below 4,000 feet (1,200 m), creating conditions for hot summer days and cool to chilly winter nights.

Nevada and California have by far the longest diagonal line (in respect to the cardinal directions) as a state boundary at just over 400 miles (640 km). This line begins in Lake Tahoe nearly 4 miles (6.4 km) offshore (in the direction of the boundary), and continues to the Colorado River where the Nevada, California, and Arizona boundaries merge 12 miles (19 km) southwest of the Laughlin Bridge.

The largest mountain range in the southern portion of the state is the Spring Mountain Range, just west of Las Vegas. The state's lowest point is along the Colorado River, south of Laughlin.

Nevada has 172 mountain summits with 2,000 feet (610 m) of prominence. Nevada ranks second in the United States by the number of mountains, behind Alaska, and ahead of California, Montana, and Washington.

== Climate ==
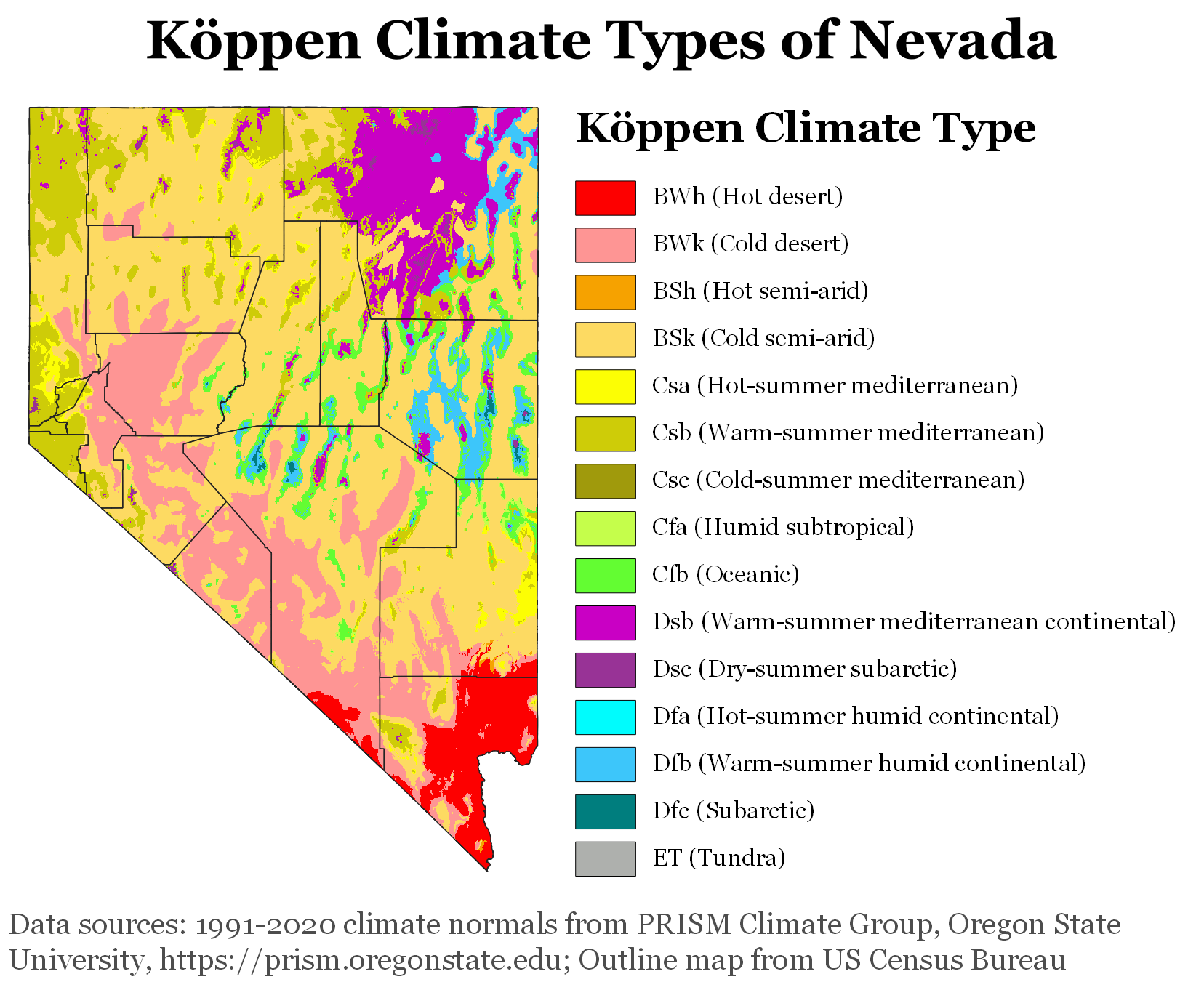
Köppen climate types of Nevada, using 1991-2020 climate normals.

Nevada is the driest state in the United States. It is made up of mostly desert and semi-arid climate regions, and, with the exception of the Las Vegas Valley, the average summer diurnal temperature range approaches 40 °F (22 °C) in much of the state. While winters in northern Nevada are long and fairly cold, the winter season in the southern part of the state tends to be of short duration and mild. Most parts of Nevada receive scarce precipitation during the year. The most rain that falls in the state falls on the east and northeast slopes of the Sierra Nevada.

The average annual rainfall per year is about 7 inches (180 mm); the wettest parts get around 40 inches (1,000 mm). Nevada's highest recorded temperature is 125 °F (52 °C) at Laughlin on June 29, 1994, and the lowest recorded temperature is −50 °F (−46 °C) at San Jacinto on January 8, 1937. Nevada's 125 °F (52 °C) reading is the third highest statewide record high temperature of a U.S. state, just behind Arizona's 128 °F (53 °C) reading and California's 134 °F (57 °C) reading.

=== Climate data ===
Average daily maximum and minimum temperatures for selected cities in Nevada
Location	July (°F)		July (°C)		December (°F)		December (°C)	
Location	Max	Min	Max	Min	Max	Min	Max	Min
Las Vegas	106	81	41	27	56	38	13	3
Reno	92	57	33	14	45	25	7	–4
Carson City	89	52	32	11	45	22	7	–5
Elko	90	50	32	10	37	14	2	–9
Fallon	92	54	33	12	45	19	7	–7
Winnemucca	93	52	34	11	41	17	5	–8
Laughlin	112	80	44	27	65	43	18	6

Climate data for Las Vegas (Köppen BWh) (Note: 1991-2020 normals. Mean monthly maxima and minima (i.e. the highest and lowest temperature readings during an entire month or year) calculated based on data at said location from 1991 to 2020.)
Month	Jan	Feb	Mar	Apr	May	Jun	Jul	Aug	Sep	Oct	Nov	Dec	Year
Record high °F (°C)	77 (25)	87 (31)	92 (33)	99 (37)	109 (43)	117 (47)	117 (47)	116 (47)	114 (46)	103 (39)	87 (31)	78 (26)	117 (47)
Mean maximum °F (°C)	68.7 (20.4)	74.2 (23.4)	84.3 (29.1)	93.6 (34.2)	101.8 (38.8)	110.1 (43.4)	112.9 (44.9)	110.3 (43.5)	105.0 (40.6)	94.6 (34.8)	80.5 (26.9)	67.9 (19.9)	113.6 (45.3)
Mean daily maximum °F (°C)	58.5 (14.7)	62.9 (17.2)	71.1 (21.7)	78.5 (25.8)	88.5 (31.4)	99.4 (37.4)	104.5 (40.3)	102.8 (39.3)	94.9 (34.9)	81.2 (27.3)	67.1 (19.5)	56.9 (13.8)	80.5 (26.9)
Daily mean °F (°C)	49.5 (9.7)	53.5 (11.9)	60.8 (16.0)	67.7 (19.8)	77.3 (25.2)	87.6 (30.9)	93.2 (34.0)	91.7 (33.2)	83.6 (28.7)	70.4 (21.3)	57.2 (14.0)	48.2 (9.0)	70.1 (21.2)
Mean daily minimum °F (°C)	40.5 (4.7)	44.1 (6.7)	50.5 (10.3)	56.9 (13.8)	66.1 (18.9)	75.8 (24.3)	82.0 (27.8)	80.6 (27.0)	72.4 (22.4)	59.6 (15.3)	47.3 (8.5)	39.6 (4.2)	59.6 (15.3)
Mean minimum °F (°C)	29.8 (−1.2)	32.9 (0.5)	38.7 (3.7)	45.2 (7.3)	52.8 (11.6)	62.2 (16.8)	72.9 (22.7)	70.8 (21.6)	60.8 (16.0)	47.4 (8.6)	35.2 (1.8)	29.0 (−1.7)	27.4 (−2.6)
Record low °F (°C)	8 (−13)	16 (−9)	19 (−7)	31 (−1)	38 (3)	48 (9)	56 (13)	54 (12)	43 (6)	26 (−3)	15 (−9)	11 (−12)	8 (−13)
Average precipitation inches (mm)	0.56 (14)	0.80 (20)	0.42 (11)	0.20 (5.1)	0.07 (1.8)	0.04 (1.0)	0.38 (9.7)	0.32 (8.1)	0.32 (8.1)	0.32 (8.1)	0.30 (7.6)	0.45 (11)	4.18 (106)
Average snowfall inches (cm)	0.0 (0.0)	0.0 (0.0)	0.0 (0.0)	0.0 (0.0)	0.0 (0.0)	0.0 (0.0)	0.0 (0.0)	0.0 (0.0)	0.0 (0.0)	0.0 (0.0)	0.0 (0.0)	0.2 (0.51)	0.2 (0.51)
Average precipitation days (≥ 0.01 in)	3.1	4.1	2.8	1.6	1.1	0.4	2.5	2.2	1.8	1.7	1.5	3.0	25.8
Average snowy days (≥ 0.1 in)	0.0	0.1	0.0	0.0	0.0	0.0	0.0	0.0	0.0	0.0	0.0	0.1	0.2
Average relative humidity (%)	45.1	39.6	33.1	25.0	21.3	16.5	21.1	25.6	25.0	28.8	37.2	45.0	30.3
Average dew point °F (°C)	22.1 (−5.5)	23.7 (−4.6)	23.9 (−4.5)	24.1 (−4.4)	28.2 (−2.1)	30.9 (−0.6)	40.6 (4.8)	44.1 (6.7)	37.0 (2.8)	30.4 (−0.9)	25.3 (−3.7)	22.3 (−5.4)	29.4 (−1.5)
Mean monthly sunshine hours	245.2	246.7	314.6	346.1	388.1	401.7	390.9	368.5	337.1	304.4	246.0	236.0	3,825.3
Percentage possible sunshine	79	81	85	88	89	92	88	88	91	87	80	78	86
Source: NOAA (relative humidity, dew point and sun 1961–1990)

Climate data for Reno (Köppen BSk) (Note: Mean maxima and minima (i.e., the highest and lowest temperature readings during an entire month or year) calculated based on data at said location from 1991 to 2020. Official records for Reno kept January 1893 to 10 November 1905 at "Reno", 11 November 1905 to February 1937 at Reno Weather Bureau Office (CRB), and at Reno–Tahoe International Airport since March 1937. For more information, see Threadex)
Month	Jan	Feb	Mar	Apr	May	Jun	Jul	Aug	Sep	Oct	Nov	Dec	Year
Record high °F (°C)	71 (22)	75 (24)	83 (28)	90 (32)	98 (37)	104 (40)	108 (42)	105 (41)	106 (41)	93 (34)	77 (25)	71 (22)	108 (42)
Mean maximum °F (°C)	61.2 (16.2)	65.3 (18.5)	73.9 (23.3)	80.9 (27.2)	89.4 (31.9)	97.0 (36.1)	102.1 (38.9)	100.0 (37.8)	94.5 (34.7)	85.0 (29.4)	71.5 (21.9)	61.7 (16.5)	102.6 (39.2)
Mean daily maximum °F (°C)	47.7 (8.7)	52.1 (11.2)	59.2 (15.1)	64.7 (18.2)	74.1 (23.4)	84.6 (29.2)	93.9 (34.4)	92.1 (33.4)	83.8 (28.8)	70.4 (21.3)	56.7 (13.7)	46.7 (8.2)	68.8 (20.4)
Daily mean °F (°C)	36.9 (2.7)	40.6 (4.8)	46.6 (8.1)	51.6 (10.9)	60.3 (15.7)	69.2 (20.7)	77.2 (25.1)	75.1 (23.9)	67.0 (19.4)	55.1 (12.8)	43.8 (6.6)	36.2 (2.3)	55.0 (12.8)
Mean daily minimum °F (°C)	26.1 (−3.3)	29.0 (−1.7)	34.0 (1.1)	38.5 (3.6)	46.6 (8.1)	53.8 (12.1)	60.4 (15.8)	58.1 (14.5)	50.3 (10.2)	39.7 (4.3)	31.0 (−0.6)	25.7 (−3.5)	41.1 (5.1)
Mean minimum °F (°C)	12.2 (−11.0)	16.1 (−8.8)	21.3 (−5.9)	26.2 (−3.2)	34.0 (1.1)	41.0 (5.0)	50.7 (10.4)	48.5 (9.2)	39.0 (3.9)	27.4 (−2.6)	17.4 (−8.1)	11.3 (−11.5)	6.6 (−14.1)
Record low °F (°C)	−17 (−27)	−16 (−27)	−3 (−19)	13 (−11)	16 (−9)	25 (−4)	33 (1)	24 (−4)	20 (−7)	8 (−13)	1 (−17)	−16 (−27)	−17 (−27)
Average precipitation inches (mm)	1.25 (32)	1.03 (26)	0.80 (20)	0.44 (11)	0.55 (14)	0.41 (10)	0.20 (5.1)	0.24 (6.1)	0.21 (5.3)	0.50 (13)	0.62 (16)	1.10 (28)	7.35 (187)
Average snowfall inches (cm)	5.2 (13)	5.2 (13)	2.9 (7.4)	0.4 (1.0)	0.1 (0.25)	0.0 (0.0)	0.0 (0.0)	0.0 (0.0)	0.0 (0.0)	0.1 (0.25)	1.8 (4.6)	5.2 (13)	20.9 (53)
Average precipitation days (≥ 0.01 in)	6.9	7.0	5.5	4.5	4.4	3.1	1.7	1.6	2.0	2.9	4.3	6.6	50.5
Average snowy days (≥ 0.1 in)	3.4	3.3	2.0	0.7	0.2	0.0	0.0	0.0	0.0	0.1	1.2	3.0	13.9
Average relative humidity (%)	68.0	60.2	52.7	45.9	43.2	39.9	36.2	39.3	44.0	50.7	61.2	67.6	50.7
Mean monthly sunshine hours	195.6	204.2	291.0	332.1	375.8	393.8	424.0	390.8	343.9	295.2	212.0	187.5	3,645.9
Percentage possible sunshine	65	68	78	83	84	88	93	92	92	85	70	64	82
Source: NOAA (relative humidity and sun 1961–1990)

Climate data for Carson City (Köppen BSk) (Note: 1991–2020 normals, extremes 1893–present)
Month	Jan	Feb	Mar	Apr	May	Jun	Jul	Aug	Sep	Oct	Nov	Dec	Year
Record high °F (°C)	72 (22)	76 (24)	81 (27)	88 (31)	94 (34)	101 (38)	107 (42)	105 (41)	103 (39)	93 (34)	79 (26)	75 (24)	107 (42)
Mean maximum °F (°C)	59.3 (15.2)	62.4 (16.9)	70.7 (21.5)	77.9 (25.5)	85.6 (29.8)	93.6 (34.2)	99.0 (37.2)	96.5 (35.8)	91.9 (33.3)	82.7 (28.2)	70.7 (21.5)	60.5 (15.8)	99.0 (37.2)
Mean daily maximum °F (°C)	45.5 (7.5)	49.5 (9.7)	56.2 (13.4)	61.7 (16.5)	70.4 (21.3)	80.9 (27.2)	89.5 (31.9)	87.8 (31.0)	80.7 (27.1)	68.0 (20.0)	54.5 (12.5)	44.6 (7.0)	65.8 (18.8)
Daily mean °F (°C)	34.8 (1.6)	38.3 (3.5)	43.9 (6.6)	48.8 (9.3)	56.6 (13.7)	65.0 (18.3)	72.1 (22.3)	70.2 (21.2)	63.1 (17.3)	52.2 (11.2)	41.4 (5.2)	34.2 (1.2)	51.7 (10.9)
Mean daily minimum °F (°C)	24.1 (−4.4)	27.1 (−2.7)	31.6 (−0.2)	35.8 (2.1)	42.9 (6.1)	49.2 (9.6)	54.8 (12.7)	52.5 (11.4)	45.6 (7.6)	36.3 (2.4)	28.4 (−2.0)	23.9 (−4.5)	37.7 (3.2)
Mean minimum °F (°C)	6.9 (−13.9)	11.7 (−11.3)	17.4 (−8.1)	22.3 (−5.4)	29.7 (−1.3)	35.8 (2.1)	44.4 (6.9)	42.1 (5.6)	34.3 (1.3)	21.8 (−5.7)	11.4 (−11.4)	6.2 (−14.3)	0.6 (−17.4)
Record low °F (°C)	−27 (−33)	−22 (−30)	−5 (−21)	3 (−16)	18 (−8)	25 (−4)	33 (1)	26 (−3)	17 (−8)	6 (−14)	−5 (−21)	−26 (−32)	−27 (−33)
Average precipitation inches (mm)	1.72 (44)	1.48 (38)	1.24 (31)	0.51 (13)	0.51 (13)	0.37 (9.4)	0.18 (4.6)	0.14 (3.6)	0.24 (6.1)	0.55 (14)	0.90 (23)	1.50 (38)	9.34 (237.7)
Average snowfall inches (cm)	3.6 (9.1)	1.7 (4.3)	1.6 (4.1)	0.0 (0.0)	0.0 (0.0)	0.0 (0.0)	0.0 (0.0)	0.0 (0.0)	0.0 (0.0)	0.0 (0.0)	0.7 (1.8)	6.4 (16)	14.0 (36)
Average precipitation days (≥ 0.01 in)	6.2	5.6	4.8	3.2	3.4	1.7	0.9	1.0	1.1	2.4	3.3	4.8	38.4
Average snowy days (≥ 0.1 in)	1.8	1.4	1.0	0.1	0.0	0.0	0.0	0.0	0.0	0.0	0.6	1.4	6.3
Source 1: NOAA
Source 2: National Weather Service

== Flora and fauna ==
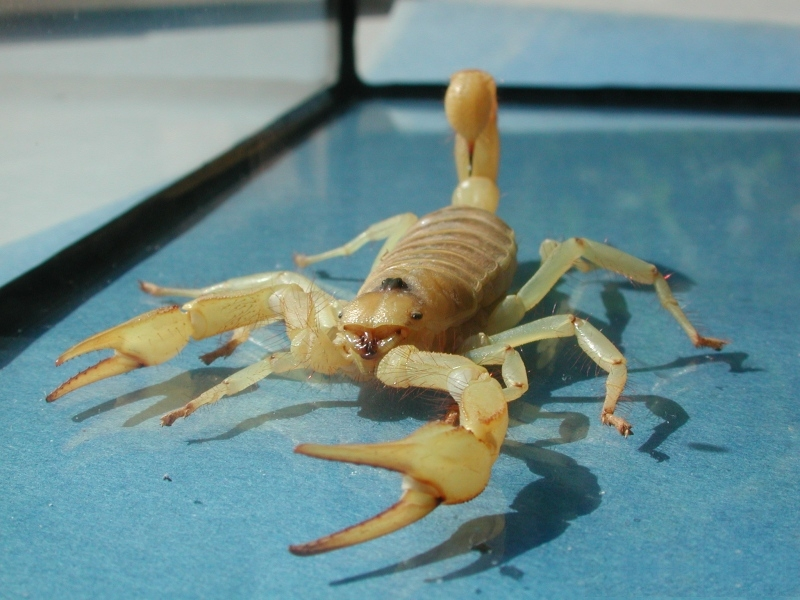
The giant hairy scorpion is the largest scorpion in North America and is commonly found in Nevada.

Being the driest U.S. state, and with much of it located within large deserts like the Great Basin Desert and the Mojave Desert, most of Nevada's organisms are adapted to a desert environment.

Even so, the ecosystem of Nevada is diverse and differs by state area. It contains six biotic zones: alpine, sub-alpine, ponderosa pine, pinion-juniper, sagebrush and creosotebush.

It contains 488 species of birds (such as bald eagles and mountain bluebirds), 61 species of mammals (such as desert bighorn sheep and coyotes), 16 species of scorpions, 52 species of reptiles (such as Great Basin rattlesnakes and desert tortoise) and 48 species of fish (such as Lahontan cutthroat trout and mountain whitefish).

== Administration ==
=== Counties ===
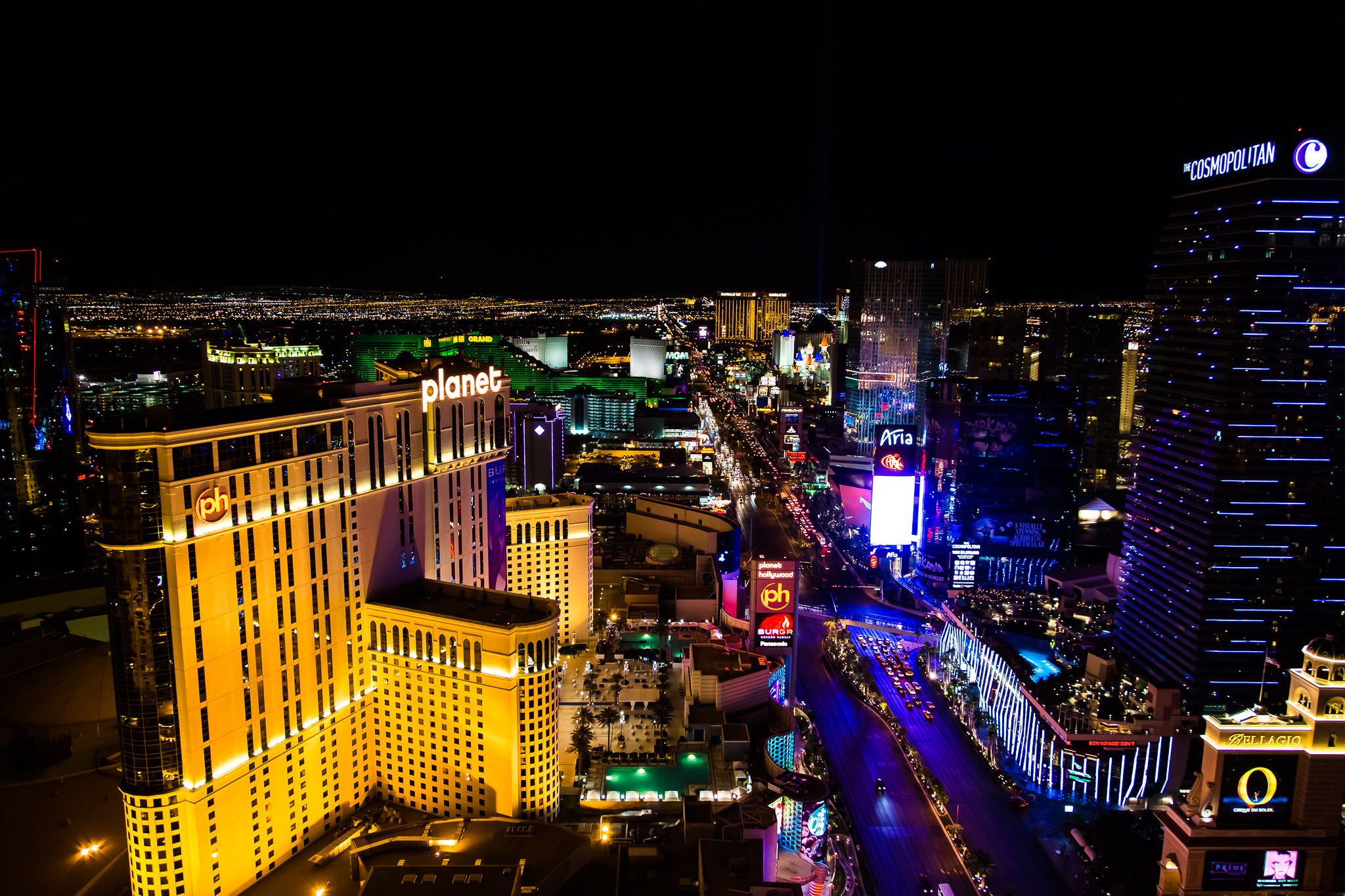
The Las Vegas Strip looking South

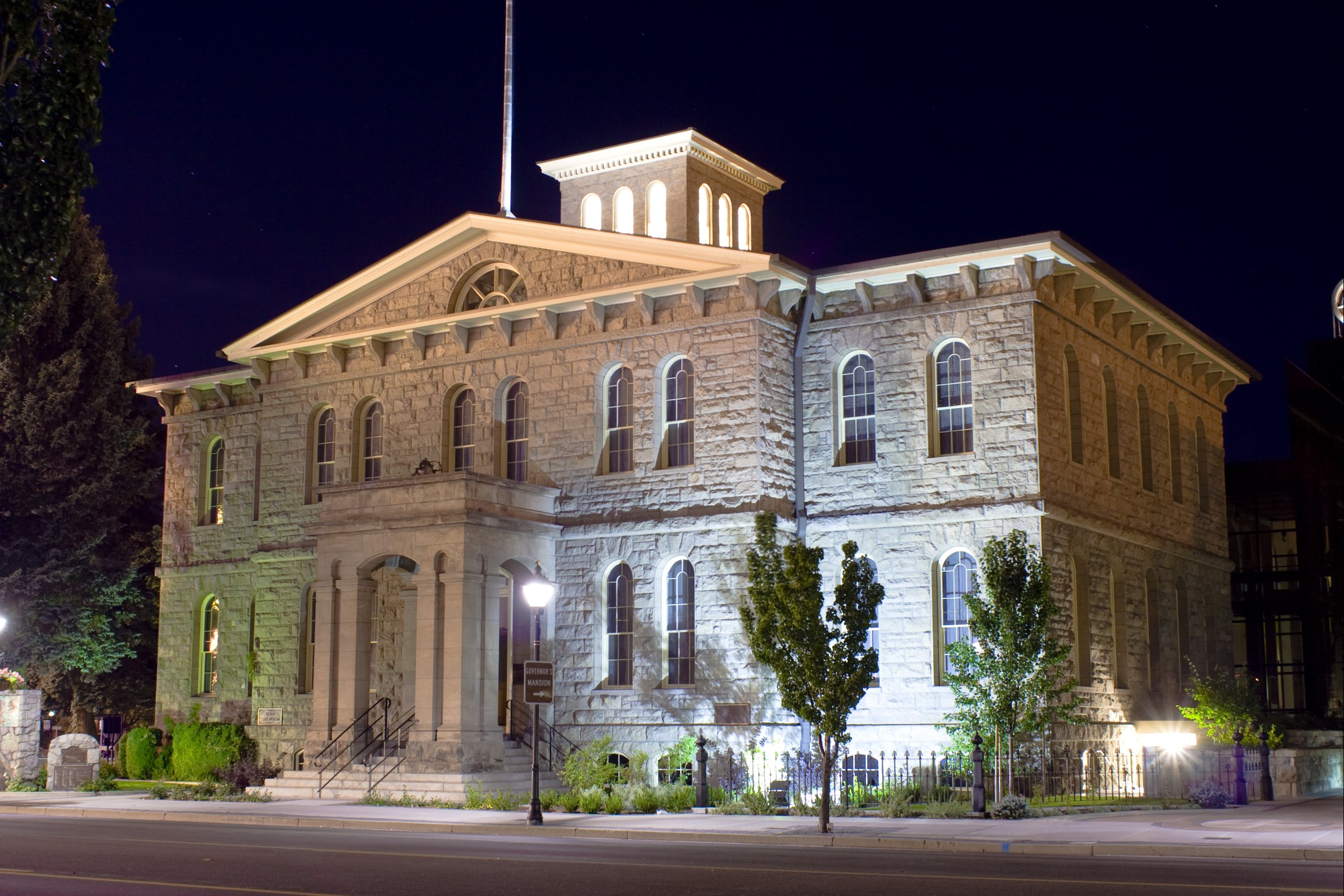
Carson City Mint in Carson City. Carson City is an independent city and the capital of Nevada.

Nevada is divided into political jurisdictions designated as counties. Carson City is officially a consolidated municipality, meaning it legally functions as both a city and a county. As of 1919, there were 17 counties in the state, ranging from 146 to 18,159 square miles (380 to 47,030 km^{2}).

Lake County, one of the original nine counties formed in 1861, was renamed Roop County in 1862. Part of the county became Lassen County, California, in 1864, resolving border uncertainty. In 1883, Washoe County annexed the portion that remained in Nevada.

In 1969, Ormsby County was dissolved and the Consolidated Municipality of Carson City was created by the Legislature in its place coterminous with the old boundaries of Ormsby County.

Bullfrog County was formed in 1987 from part of Nye County. After the creation was declared unconstitutional, the county was abolished in 1989.

Humboldt County was designated as a county in 1856 by Utah Territorial Legislature and again in 1861 by the new Nevada Legislature.

Clark County is the most populous county in Nevada, accounting for nearly three-quarters of its residents. Las Vegas, Nevada's most populous city, has been the county seat since the county was created in 1909 from a portion of Lincoln County, Nevada. Before that, it was a part of Arizona Territory. Clark County attracts numerous tourists: An estimated 44 million people visited Clark County in 2014.

Washoe County is the second-most populous county of Nevada. Its county seat is Reno. Washoe County includes the Reno–Sparks metropolitan area.

Lyon County is the third most populous county. It was one of the nine original counties created in 1861. It was named after Nathaniel Lyon, the first Union General to be killed in the Civil War. Its current county seat is Yerington. Its first county seat was established at Dayton on November 29, 1861.

Nevada counties
County name	County seat	Year founded	2021 population	Percent of total	Area		Percent of total	Population density	
County name	County seat	Year founded	2021 population	Percent of total	sq mi	km^{2}	Percent of total	per sq mi	per km^{2}
Carson City	Carson City	1861	58,993	1.88 %	157	410	0.14 %	407.80	157.45
Churchill	Fallon	1861	25,723	0.82 %	5,024	13,010	4.54 %	5.22	2.02
Clark	Las Vegas	1908	2,292,476	72.92 %	8,061	20,880	7.29 %	290.52	112.17
Douglas	Minden	1861	49,870	1.59 %	738	1,910	0.67 %	70.24	27.12
Elko	Elko	1869	53,915	1.71 %	17,203	44,560	15.56 %	3.14	1.21
Esmeralda	Goldfield	1861	743	0.02 %	3,589	9,300	3.25 %	0.21	0.081
Eureka	Eureka	1869	1,903	0.06 %	4,180	10,800	3.78 %	0.46	0.18
Humboldt	Winnemucca	1856/1861	17,648	0.56 %	9,658	25,010	8.73 %	1.83	0.71
Lander	Battle Mountain	1861	5,734	0.18 %	5,519	14,290	4.99 %	1.04	0.40
Lincoln	Pioche	1867	4,525	0.14 %	10,637	27,550	9.62 %	0.43	0.17
Lyon	Yerington	1861	60,903	1.94 %	2,024	5,240	1.83 %	30.44	11.75
Mineral	Hawthorne	1911	4,586	0.15 %	3,813	9,880	3.45 %	1.22	0.47
Nye	Tonopah	1864	53,450	1.70 %	18,199	47,140	16.46 %	2.94	1.14
Pershing	Lovelock	1919	6,741	0.21 %	6,067	15,710	5.49 %	1.12	0.43
Storey	Virginia City	1861	4,143	0.13 %	264	680	0.24 %	15.75	6.08
Washoe	Reno	1861	493,392	15.69 %	6,542	16,940	5.92 %	78.29	30.23
White Pine	Ely	1869	9,182	0.29 %	8,897	23,040	8.05 %	1.03	0.40
Totals	Counties: 17		3,143,991		110,572	286,380		28.64	11.06

=== Settlements ===
Largest cities or towns in Nevada Source:
Rank	Name	County	Pop.
1	Las Vegas	Clark	641,903
2	Henderson	Clark	317,610
3	Reno	Washoe	264,165
4	North Las Vegas	Clark	262,527
5	Enterprise	Clark	221,831
6	Spring Valley	Clark	215,597
7	Sunrise Manor	Clark	205,618
8	Paradise	Clark	191,238
9	Sparks	Washoe	108,445
10	Carson City	Carson City	58,639

== See also ==
- Geography of California
- Geography of New Mexico
