= Environment of Nevada =

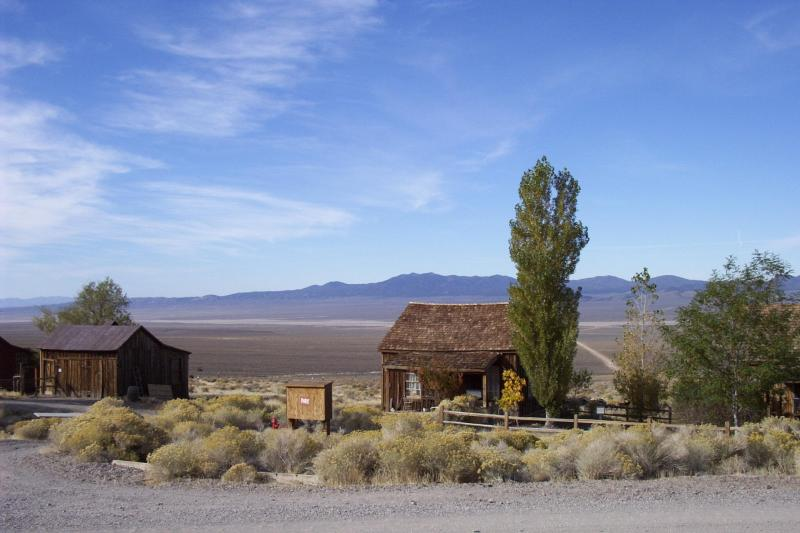
Berlin-Ichthyosaur State Park

The environment of Nevada comprises diverse biotas, climates, and geologies. Environmental regulations and the environmental movement have aimed to respond to environmental threats.

== Renewable Portfolio Standard ==
External image
- Electricity in Nevada 2001—2017

In 1997 Nevada passed a Renewable Portfolio Standard as part of their 1997 Electric Restructuring Legislation (AB 366) It required any electric providers in the state to acquire actual renewable electric generation or purchase renewable energy credits so that each utility had 1 percent of total consumption in renewables. However, on June 8, 2001, Nevada Governor Kenny Guinn signed SB 372, at the time the country's most aggressive renewable portfolio standard. The law requires that 15 percent of all electricity generated in Nevada be derived from new renewables by the year 2013.

The 2001 revision to the RPS keeps in place Nevada's commitment to expand solar energy resources by requiring that at least 5 percent of the renewable energy projects must generate electricity from solar energy.

In June 2005, the Nevada legislature passed a bill during a special legislative session that modified the Nevada RPS (Assembly Bill 03). The bill extends the deadline and raised the requirements of the RPS to 20 percent of sales by 2015. Coal was the main source for electricity in Nevada until it was surpassed by natural gas in 2005, which has generated more than half since then.

== Yucca Mountain Repository ==
Yucca Mountain nuclear waste repository is the proposed U.S. Department of Energy deep geological repository storage facility for spent nuclear reactor fuel and other radioactive waste. The repository is located in a desert on federal land adjacent to the Nevada Test Site in Nye County, Nevada, about 80 miles from the Las Vegas metropolitan area. The repository lies within Yucca Mountain, a ridge line in the south-central part of the U.S. state of Nevada. The ridge is composed of volcanic material (mostly tuff) ejected from a now-extinct caldera-forming supervolcano.

== See also ==
- Natural disasters in Nevada
- List of Superfund sites in Nevada
