= List of people from Nevada =

State flag of Nevada

Location of Nevada in the United States

Following is a list of notable people who were born in, raised in, or have lived for a significant period of time in the U.S. state of Nevada.

== Political figures ==
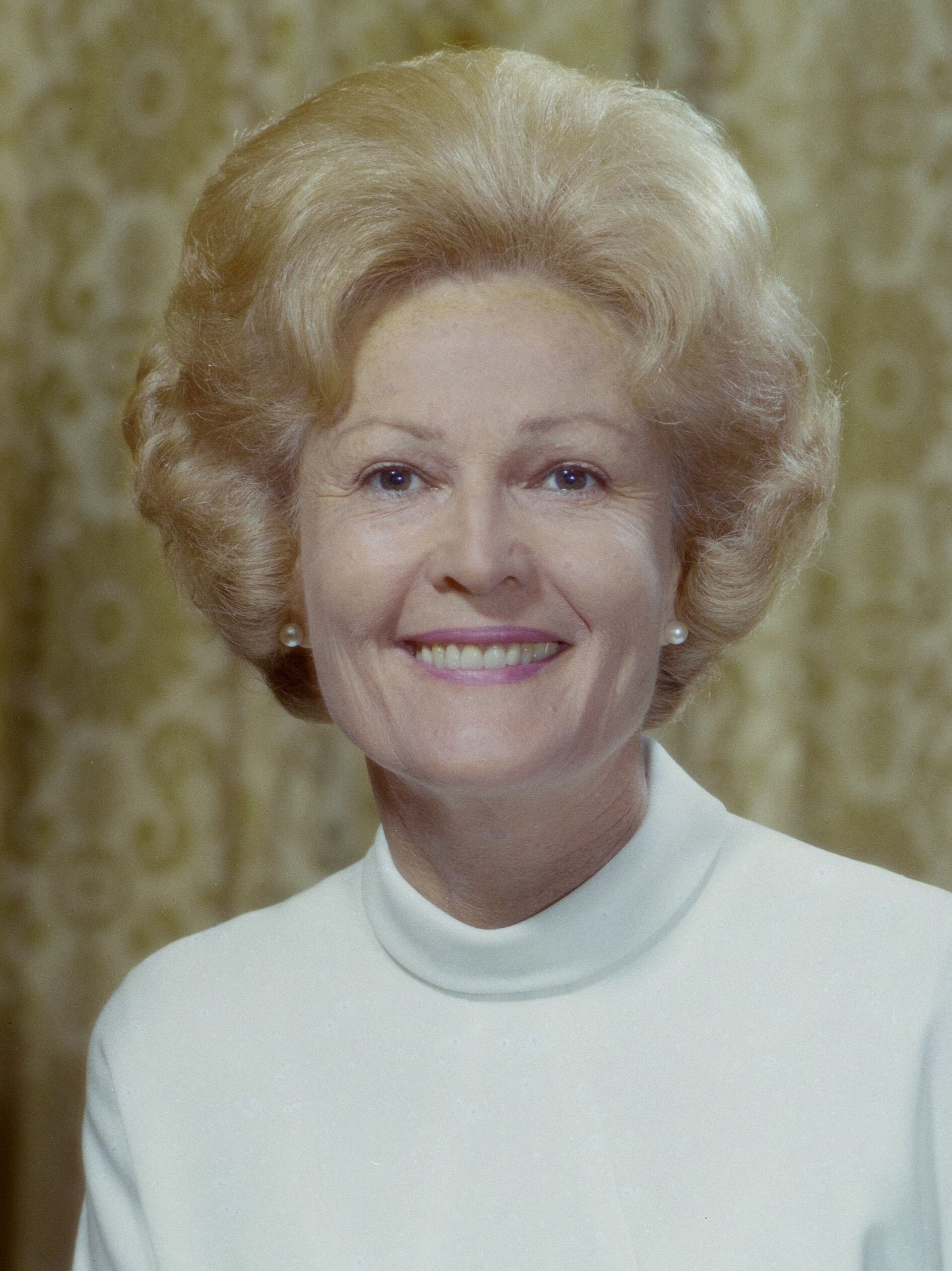
Pat Nixon

- Mark Amodei (born 1958) – U.S. representative for Nevada's 2nd congressional district
- Kathy Augustine (1956–2006) – Nevada state controller (from 1999 until her death)
- Walter Baring (1911–1975) – member of the U.S. House of Representatives from Nevada's at-large district
- Helen Delich Bentley – former Republican member of the U.S. House of Representatives
- Alan Bible (1909–1988) – former Democratic U.S. senator from Nevada
- James Bilbray – Nevada's first district, U.S. House of Representatives
- Emmet D. Boyle – first Nevada-born governor of Nevada
- Berkeley L. Bunker (1906–1999) – U.S. senator from Nevada and member of the U.S. House of Representatives
- Howard Cannon (1912–2002) – former Democratic U.S. senator from Nevada
- Catherine Cortez Masto (born 1964) – U.S. senator from Nevada (since 2017)
- Jim Gibbons (born 1944) – 28th governor of Nevada
- Carolyn Goodman – mayor of Las Vegas (2011–2024)
- Oscar Goodman – mayor of Las Vegas (2002–2011)
- Morley Griswold (1890–1951) – served in the U.S. Army in World War I; later became lieutenant governor of Nevada, and later governor of Nevada
- Martin Heinrich (born 1971) – U.S. senator from New Mexico (since 2013)
- Dean Heller – U.S. senator and former U.S. congressman from Nevada's 2nd congressional district
- Steven Horsford (born 1973) – U.S. representative for Nevada's 4th congressional district (2013–2015, since 2019)
- Velma Bronn Johnston (1912–1977) – animal-rights activist
- Ruben Kihuen (born 1980) – former U.S. representative for Nevada's 4th congressional district (2017–2019)
- Paul Laxalt – Republican governor of Nevada and U.S. senator from Nevada
- Myron E. Leavitt (1930–2004) – former lieutenant governor of Nevada
- Pat McCarran (1876–1954) – former United States senator from Nevada; namesake of McCarran International Airport, now known as Harry Reid International Airport
- Mike McGinness – Republican member of the Nevada Senate
- Pat Nixon (1912–1993) – First Lady of the United States (1969–1974)
- Key Pittman (1872–1940) – former Democratic U.S. senator from Nevada; president pro tempore and chairman of Committee on Foreign Relations
- Vail M. Pittman (1880–1964) – 19th governor of Nevada and 19th lieutenant governor of Nevada
- Harry Reid (1939–2021) – United States Senate majority leader (2007–2015) and minority leader (2005–2007, 2015–2017); namesake of Harry Reid International Airport
- Marco Rubio (born 1971) – U.S. senator from Florida (2011–2025) and United States secretary of state (since 2025)
- James David Santini (1937–2015) – U.S. representative from Nevada's At-Large district
- Grant Sawyer (1918–1996) – 21st governor of Nevada; formed Nevada Gaming Commission
- W. Frank Stewart – silver miner in Virginia City; Democratic state senator for Storey County, 1876-1880
- Jon Wellinghoff (born 1949) – attorney, energy expert, and chairman of the Federal Energy Regulatory Commission

== News media ==
=== Newspaper, radio, and television ===
- Art Bell – syndicated radio host
- A.E. Cahlan (1899–1968) – Las Vegas Review-Journal owner and publisher
- Norm Clarke – gossip columnist, Las Vegas Review-Journal
- Hank Greenspun (1909–1989) – Las Vegas Sun newspaper publisher
- Kimberly Pressler (born 1977) – sports reporter, former Miss USA

== Sportspeople ==
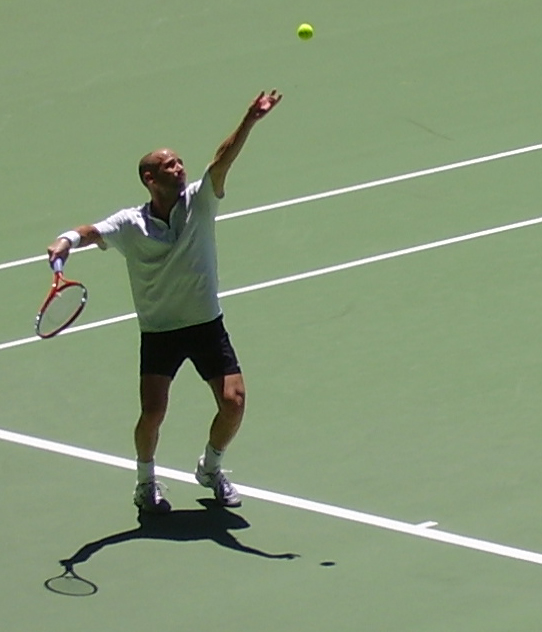
Andre Agassi

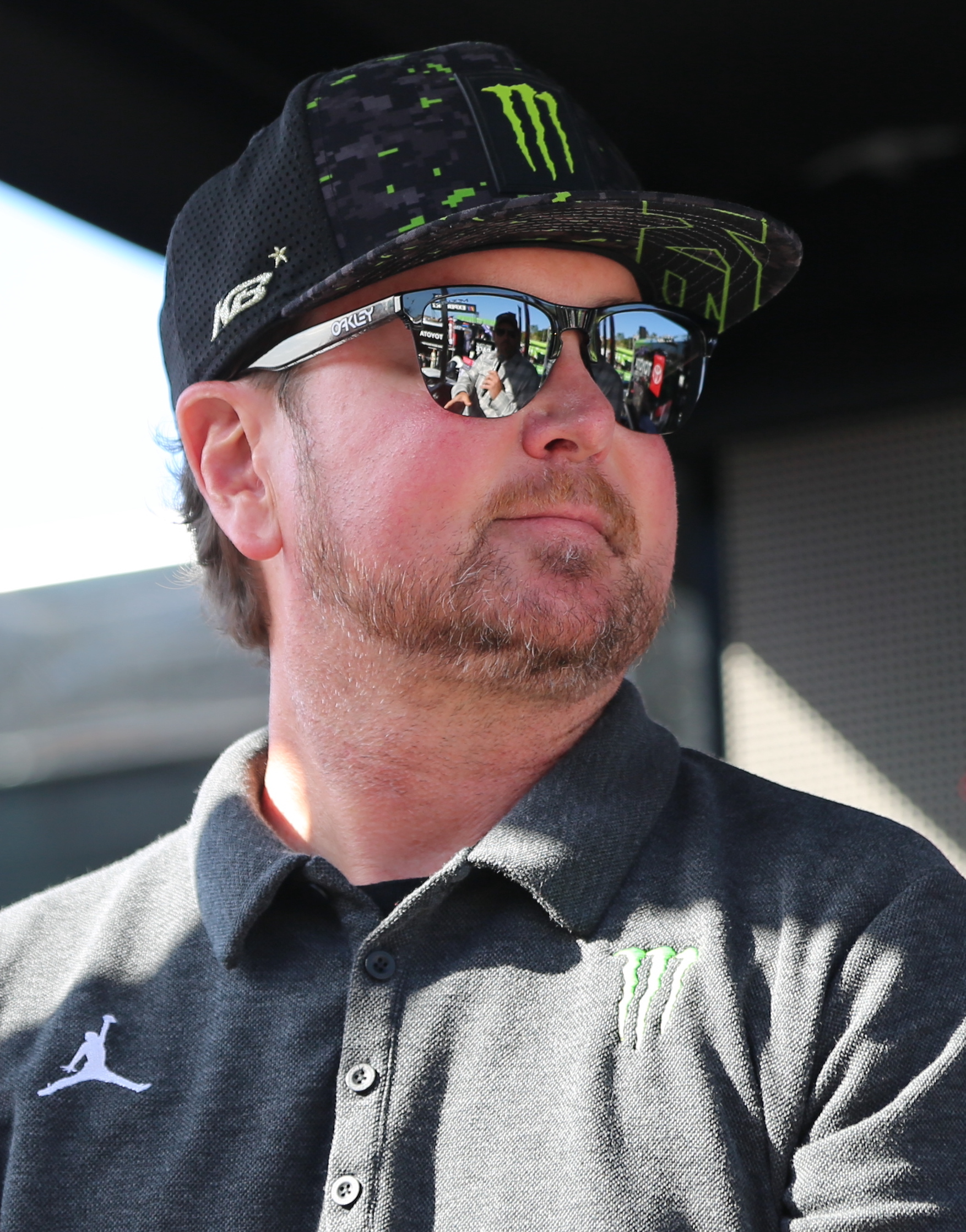
Kurt Busch

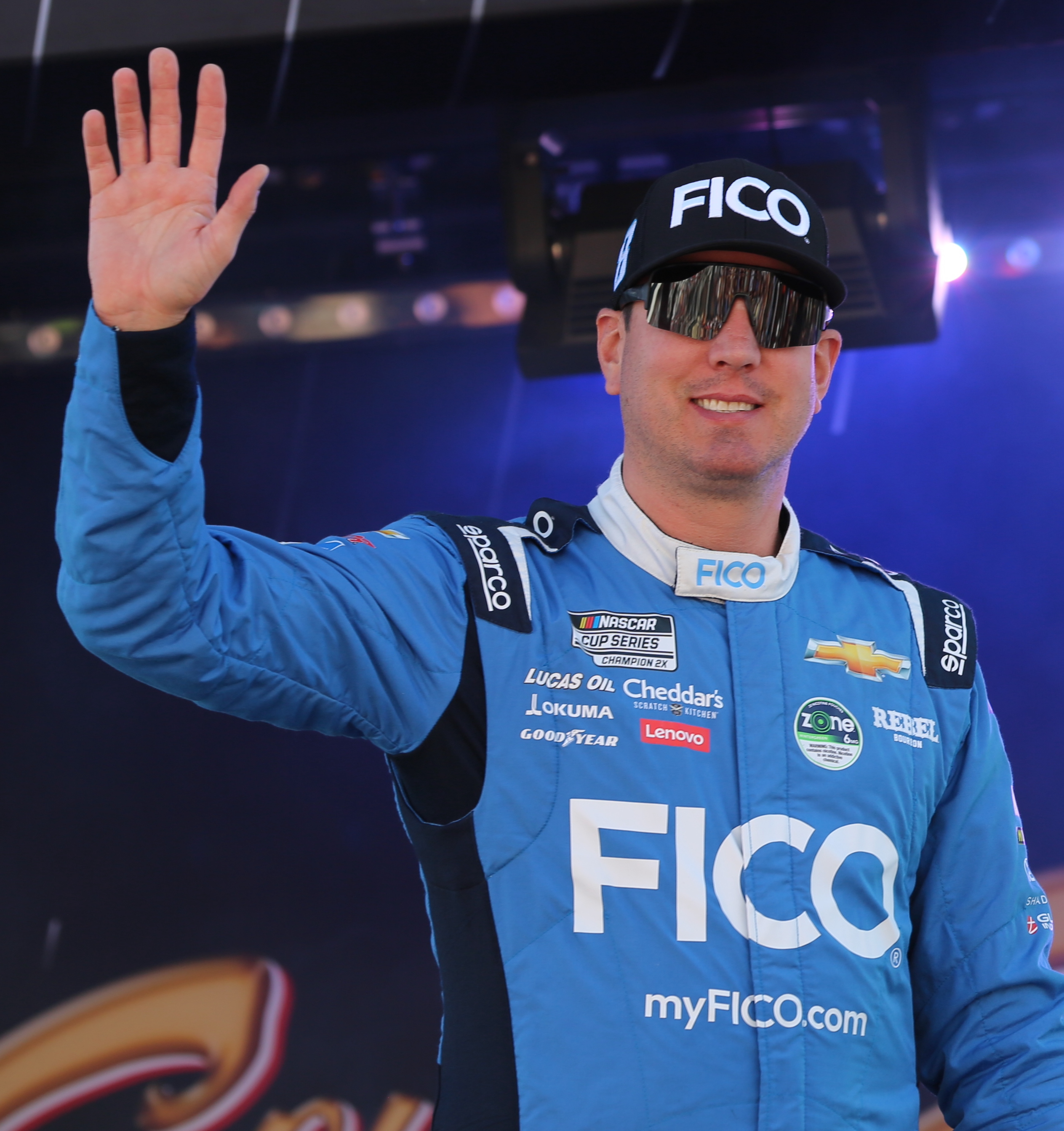
Kyle Busch

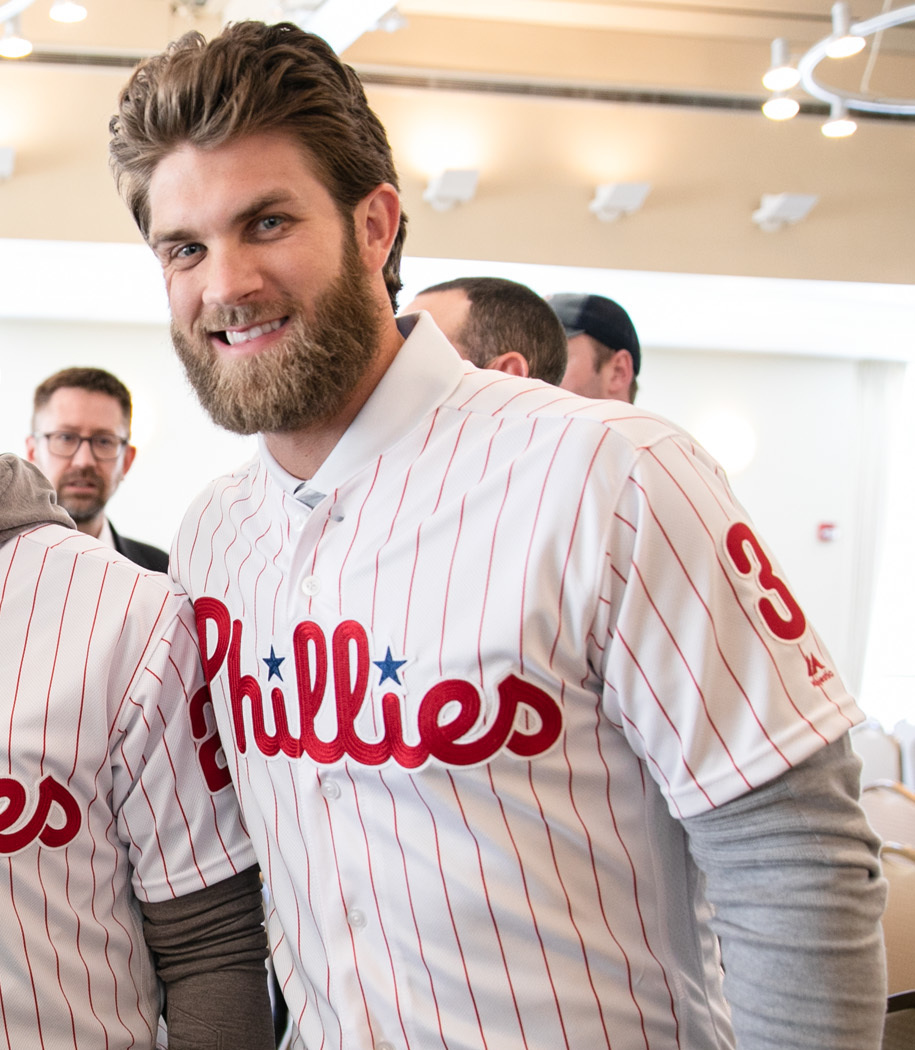
Bryce Harper

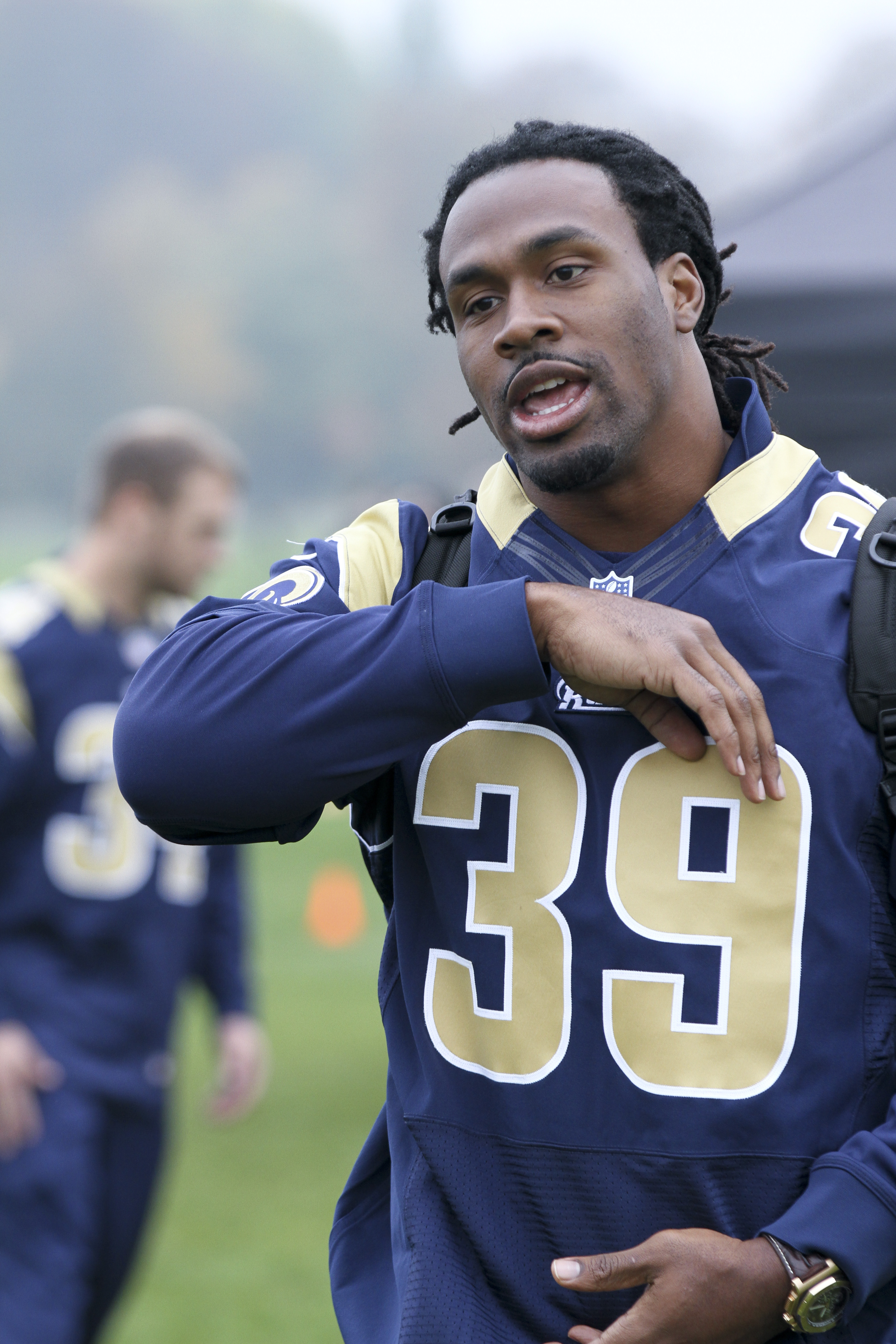
Steven Jackson

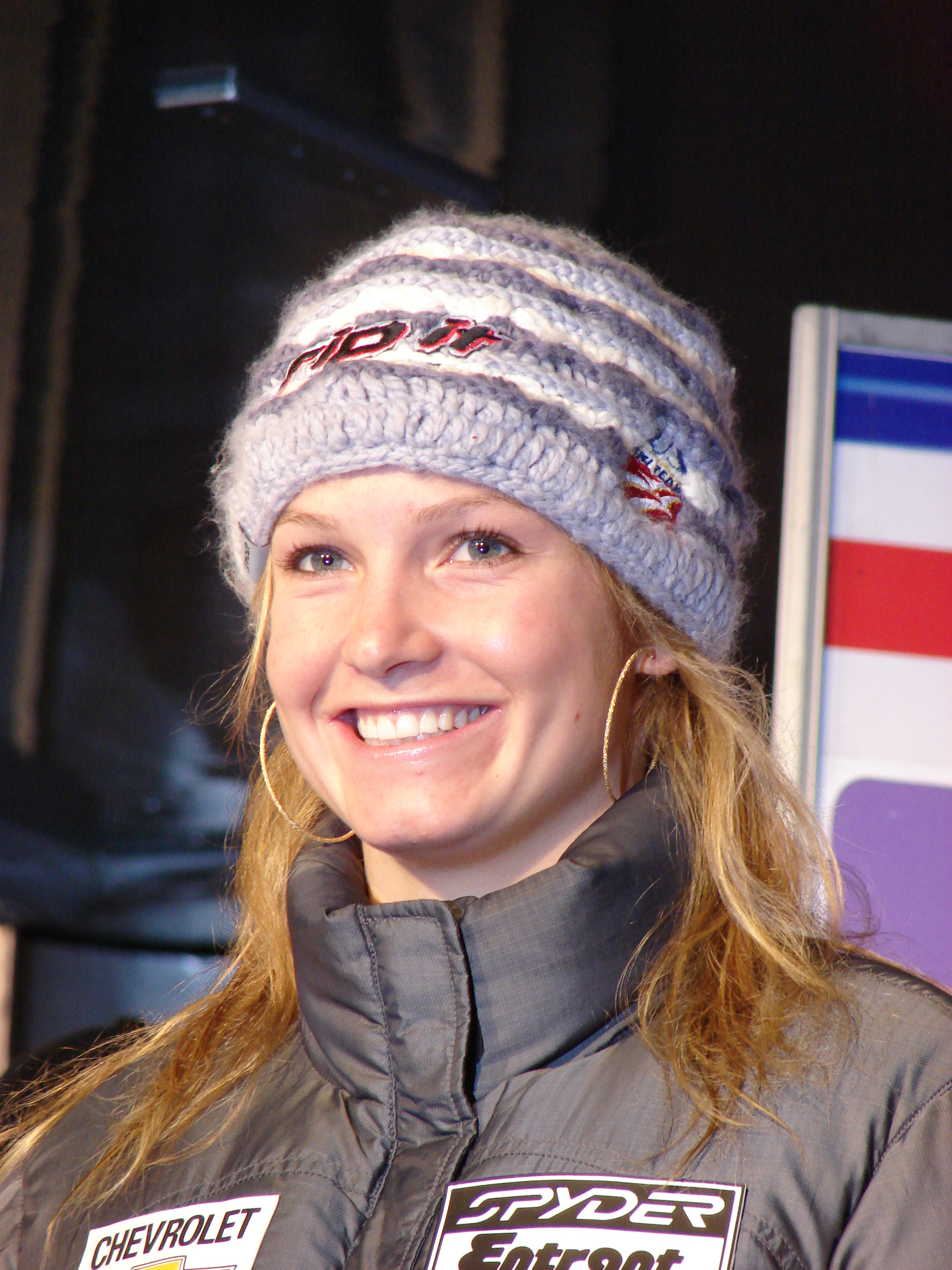
Julia Mancuso

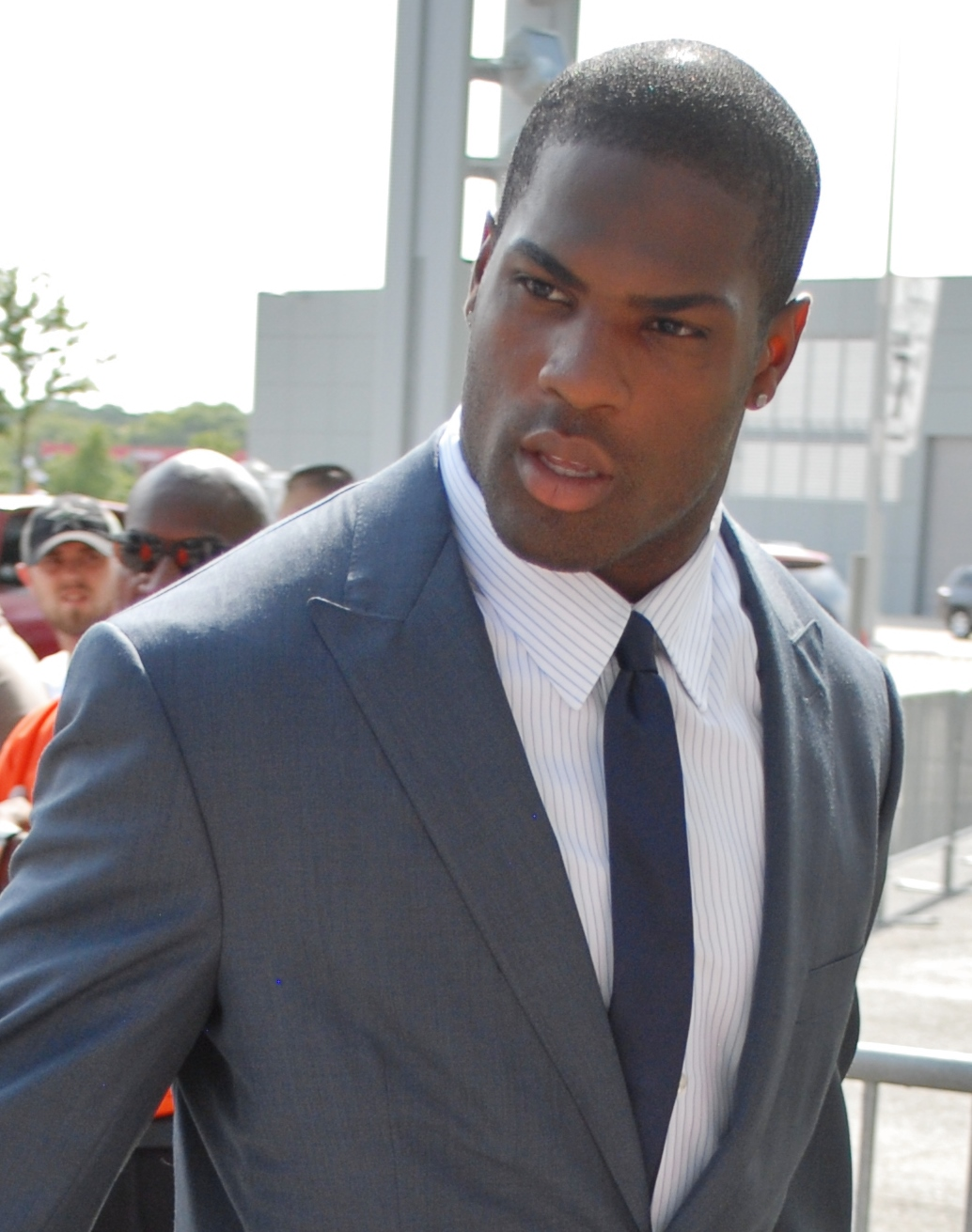
DeMarco Murray

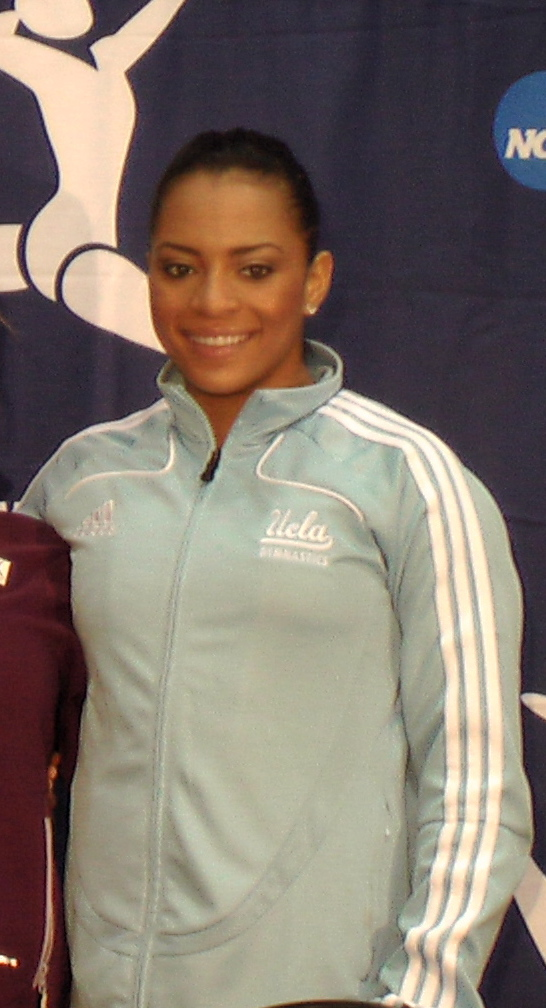
Tasha Schwikert

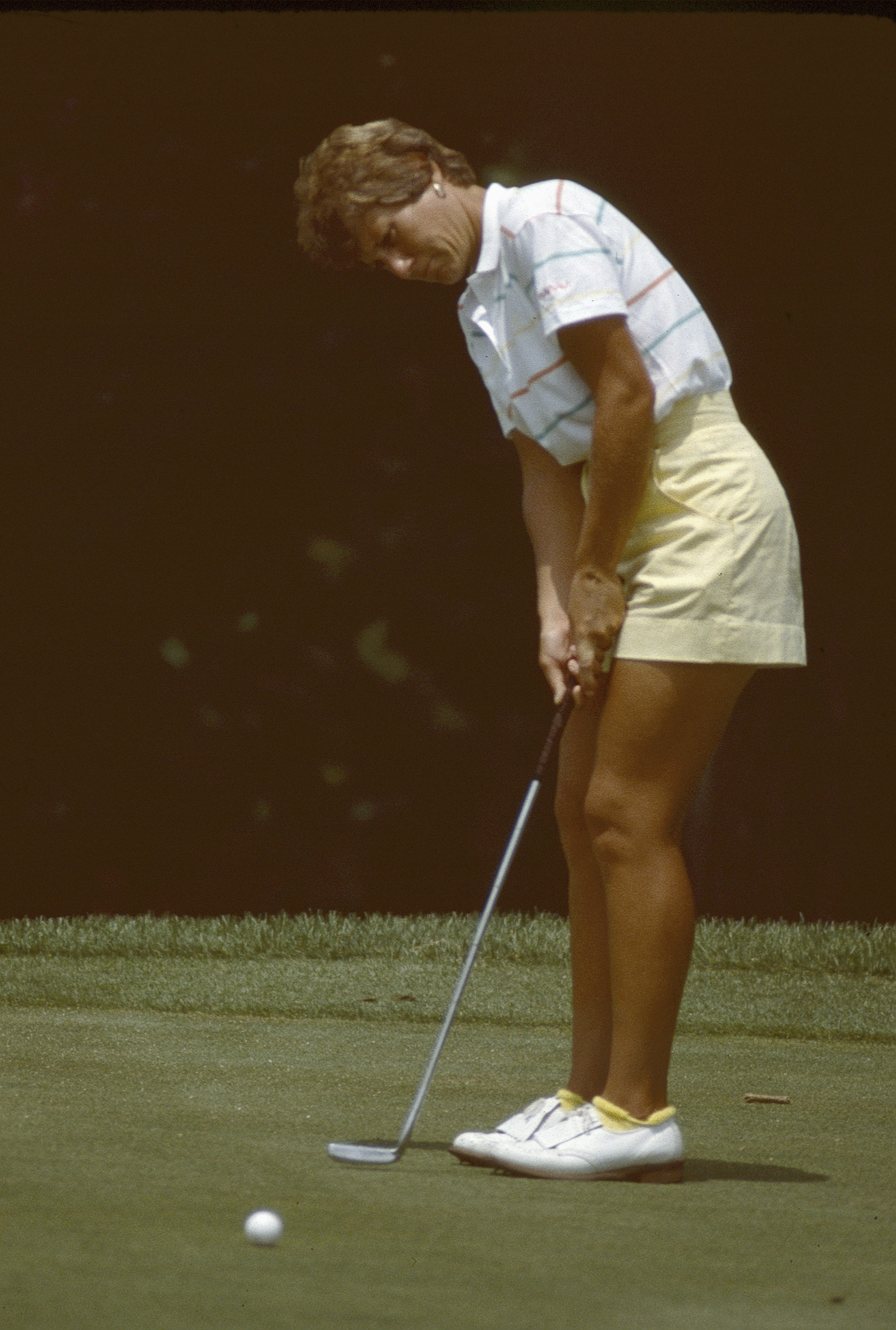
Patty Sheehan

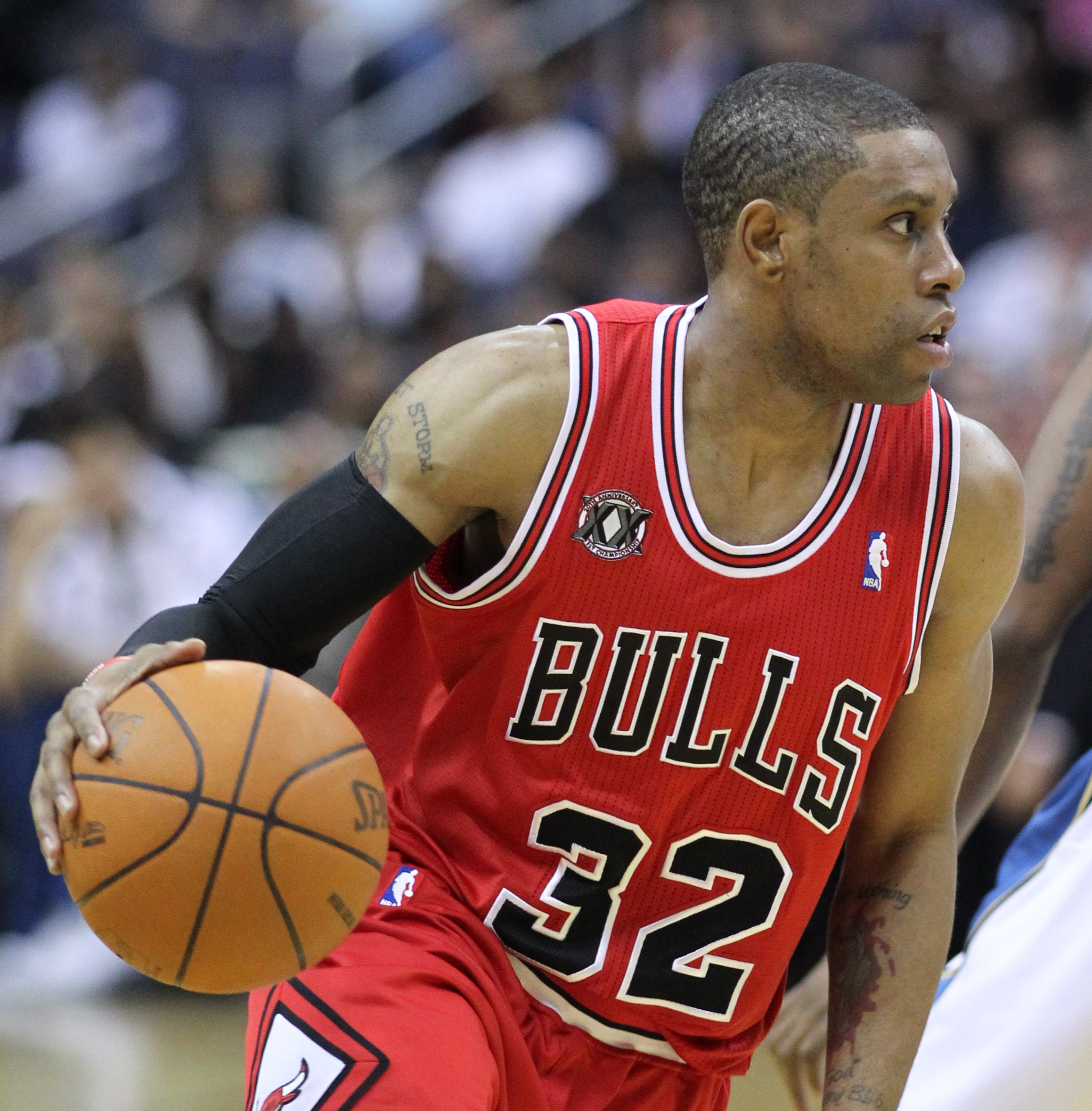
C. J. Watson

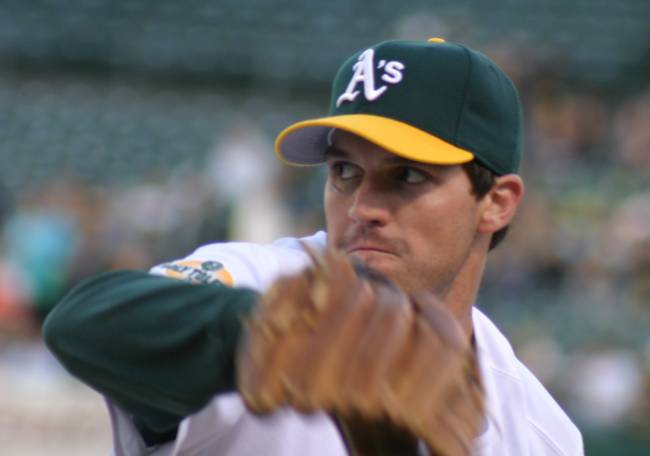
Barry Zito

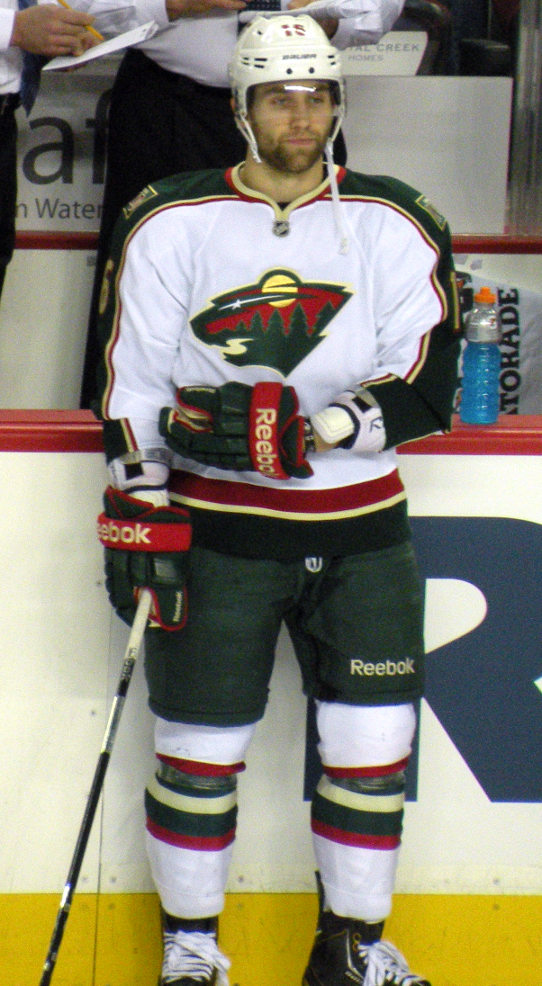
Jason Zucker

A–G

- Andre Agassi – Hall of Fame professional tennis player
- Greg Anthony – NBA player and broadcaster
- Luke Babbitt – small forward for the Portland Trail Blazers
- Ryan Bader – professional mixed martial artist with the UFC
- Shannon Bahrke – Olympic freestyle skier
- Marcus Banks – point guard for the New Orleans Hornets
- Craig Barlow – professional golfer
- Dusty Bergman – former pitcher for the Anaheim Angels
- Tyler Bey (born 1998) – basketball player in the Israeli Basketball Premier League
- Rocky Biddle – former MLB pitcher
- Erica Blasberg (1984–2010) – LPGA golfer
- Michael Blazek – pitcher for the Milwaukee Brewers
- Avery Bradley – player for the Detroit Pistons
- Kris Bryant – player for the Chicago Cubs
- Kurt Busch – NASCAR driver
- Kyle Busch – NASCAR driver
- Billy Campfield – former NFL running back
- Gina Carano – former MMA fighter
- Glenn Carano – former Dallas Cowboys quarterback
- Chris Carr – former NFL player
- Chris Carter – player for the Houston Astros
- Spencer Clark (1987–2006) – NASCAR driver
- Rico Constantino – professional wrestler
- Austin Corbett – NFL football player for the Carolina Panthers
- Marty Cordova – Major League Baseball left fielder
- Scott Cousins – former MLB outfielder
- Mike Crawford – former NFL linebacker
- Harvey Dahl – former offensive guard for the Atlanta Falcons and Los Angeles Rams
- Brian Dallimore – former infielder for the San Francisco Giants
- Ted Davidson – MLB relief pitcher
- Diana Davis – American-Russian ice dancer
- Ricky Davis – professional basketball player in the NBA
- Wheezer Dell – MLB pitcher
- Brandyn Dombrowski – offensive tackle for the San Diego Chargers
- Marion Jones Farquhar – Hall of Fame tennis player
- Joey Gallo – player for the Texas Rangers
- Brendan Gaughan – NASCAR driver
- Joey Gilbert – former boxer, lawyer, sports agent
- Nate Grimes (born 1996) – basketball player in the Israeli Basketball Premier League
- Lawrence Guy – defensive end for the New England Patriots

H–M

- Ray Handley – former football player; New York Giants former head coach
- Bryce Harper – Major League Baseball player
- Carey Hart – freestyle motocross racer, pro BMX rider
- Will Hernandez – guard for the New York Giants
- Pierre Jackson (born 1991) – basketball player
- Steven Jackson – former professional NFL football player
- Ben Jacobs – professional football player
- Nick Johnson (born 1992) – basketball player in the Israeli Basketball Premier League
- Colin Kaepernick – former professional football player
- Keith Kartz – former player for the Denver Broncos
- Klete Keller – Olympic swimmer
- Brian Kelly – former NFL cornerback
- Brandon Kintzler – pitcher for the Minnesota Twins
- Jack Kramer – Hall of Fame tennis player
- Iris Kyle – ten-time overall Ms. Olympia professional bodybuilder
- Joseph Lang (1911–1990) – boxer
- T.J. Lavin – professional BMX rider and musician
- Steven Lerud – former catcher for the Philadelphia Phillies
- Ryan Ludwick – right fielder for the Cincinnati Reds
- Greg Maddux – former Major League Baseball player, now in the MLB Hall of Fame
- Julia Mancuso – Olympic alpine ski racer, gold and silver medalist
- Brandon Marshall – former professional football player
- Josh Mauga – former professional football player
- Lucas May – former catcher for the Kansas City Royals
- Floyd Mayweather Jr. – boxer
- Jake McGee – relief pitcher for the Tampa Bay Rays
- Maurice E. McLoughlin – Hall of Fame tennis player
- Randy Messenger – former MLB pitcher
- Frank Mir – mixed martial artist; former UFC champion
- DeMarco Murray – running back for the Philadelphia Eagles

N–Z

- Roy Nelson – mixed martial artist
- Tommy Pham – outfielder for the Tampa Bay Rays
- Amy Purdy – snowboarder
- Donn Roach – MLB pitcher
- Drew Robinson – utility player for the Texas Rangers
- Rolando Romero – professional boxer
- Grey Ruegamer – professional football player in the NFL
- Ryback – professional wrestler
- Eric Sanders – former NFL player
- Nate Schierholtz – outfielder for the Washington Nationals
- Tasha Schwikert – gymnast, 2003 gold medalist
- Adam Seward – professional football player in the NFL
- Patty Sheehan – professional golfer, member of the LPGA Tour and World Golf Hall of Fame
- Chasen Shreve – relief pitcher for the St. Louis Cardinals
- Matt Smith – former MLB pitcher
- Scott Smith – mixed martial artist
- Brandon Snyder – first baseman for the Boston Red Sox
- Ronnie Stanley – NFL offensive tackle
- Stevenson Sylvester – linebacker for the Pittsburgh Steelers
- TaShawn Thomas (born 1993) – basketball player in the Israeli Premier League
- Brad Thompson – former MLB pitcher
- Domingo Tibaduiza – former elite long distance runner
- Korey Toomer – linebacker for the Dallas Cowboys
- Joe Valentine – former relief pitcher for the Cincinnati Reds
- Kyle Van Noy – linebacker for the New England Patriots
- Byron Velvick – professional bass fisherman
- Tyler Wagner – pitcher for the Arizona Diamondbacks
- H Waldman (born 1972) – American-Israeli basketball player
- C. J. Watson – professional basketball player
- Claire Weinstein (born 2007) – Olympic silver medalist freestyle swimmer
- Joe Wieland – MLB pitcher
- Duke Williams – former professional football player in the NFL
- Matt Williams – former Major League Baseball third baseman and MLB manager
- Aarik Wilson – long jumper
- Charles Wright – professional wrestler
- Barry Zito – former Major League Baseball starting pitcher
- Jason Zucker – NHL hockey player

== Entertainment ==
=== Actors ===
A–M

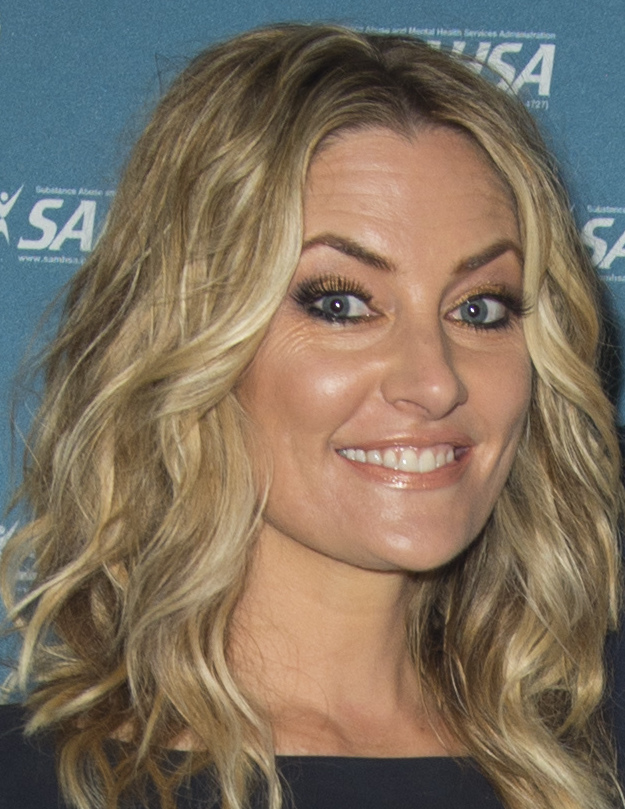
Mädchen Amick

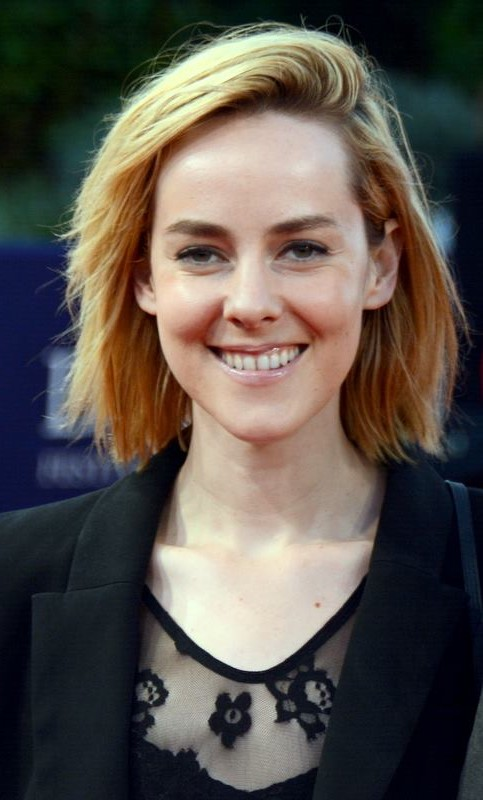
Jena Malone

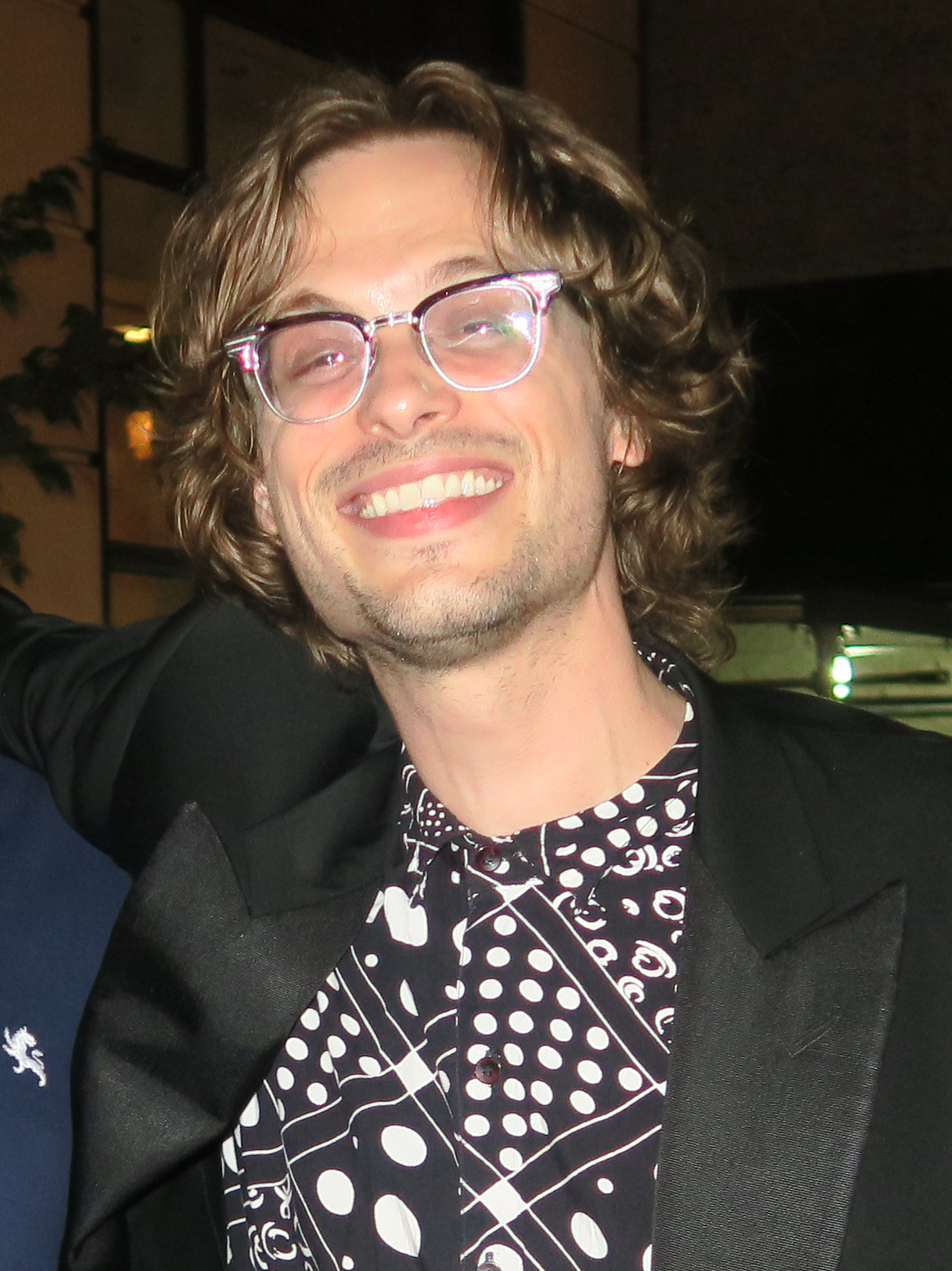
Matthew Gray Gubler

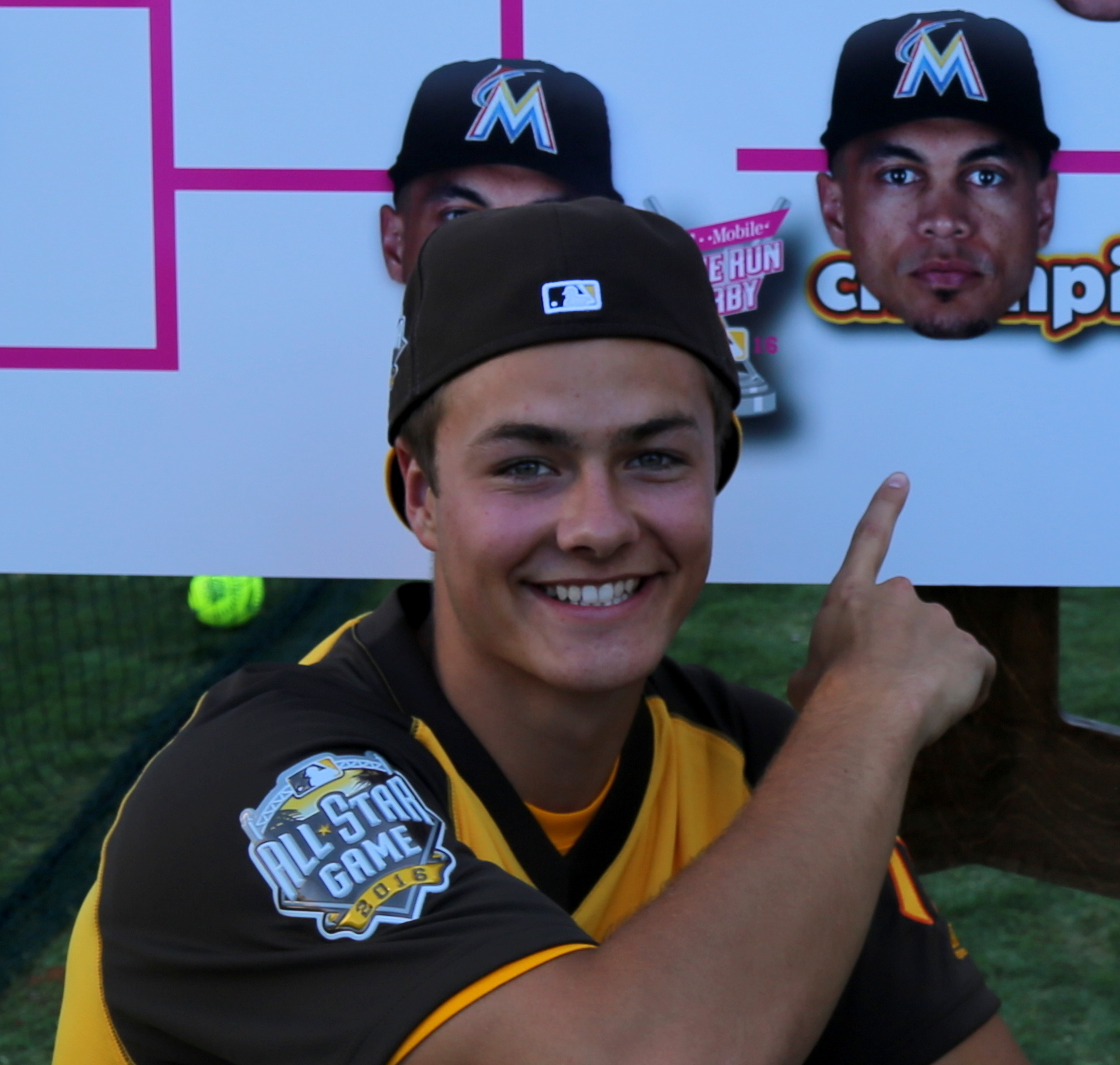
Peyton Meyer

- Ben Alexander (1911–1969) – actor
- Mädchen Amick (born 1970) – actress, Shelly Johnson on Twin Peaks
- Jaylen Barron (born 1997) – actress
- Toni Basil (born 1943) – singer-songwriter, actress
- Deanna Brooks (born 1974) – actress, model
- Reno Browne (1921–1991) – film actress, equestrian, pilot
- Charisma Carpenter (born 1970) – actress, Cordelia Chase on Buffy the Vampire Slayer and Angel
- Dillon Casey (born 1983) – actor
- Hobart Cavanaugh (1886–1950) – actor
- Daveigh Chase (1990–2026) – actress, singer, Rhonda Volmer on Big Love
- Tishara Cousino (born 1978) – model, actress, real estate broker
- Abby Dalton (1932–2020) – actress
- Gabriel Damon (born 1976) – actor
- Misty Dawn (born 1963) – adult film actress
- Doris Dawson (1909–1986) – silent film actress
- Loren Dean (born 1969) – actor, Enemy of the State, Apollo 13, Mumford
- Thomas Dekker (born 1987) – actor, musician, John Connor on Terminator: The Sarah Connor Chronicles
- Brad Dexter (1917–2002) – actor, The Magnificent Seven
- Leah Dizon (born 1986) – model, singer, Japanese television personality
- Chase Ellison (born 1993) – actor
- Kathy Evison (born 1963) – actress, Lonnie Henderson on SeaQuest DSV
- Joe Flanigan (born 1967) – actor, Major/Lt. Colonel John Sheppard on Stargate Atlantis
- Michele Greene (born 1962) – actress, singer, and songwriter
- Matthew Gray Gubler (born 1980) – actor, director, Dr. Spencer Reid on Criminal Minds
- Corinna Harney (born 1972) – model, actress, 1992 Playboy Playmate of the Year
- Veronica Hart (born 1956) – 1980s adult film actress
- Annette Haven (born 1954) – 1970s and 1980s adult film actress
- Adam Hicks (born 1992) – actor, singer, dancer
- Jenna Jameson (born 1974) – adult film actress and entertainer
- Bryce Johnson (born 1977) – actor, Josh Ford on Popular
- Rebekah Kochan (born 1984) – actress
- Michelle Krusiec (born 1974) – actress, One World
- Joseph D. Kucan (born 1965) – video game developer, director, actor, screenwriter
- Darryl Lenox (1966–2023) – comedian
- Jennifer Lyon (1972–2010) – actress, competitor on Survivor: Palau
- Jena Malone (born 1984) – actress, musician, photographer
- Lily Mariye (born 1964) – actress, Lily Jarvik on ER
- Meaghan Jette Martin (born 1992) – actress, singer, musician
- Peyton Meyer (born 1998) – actor

N–Z

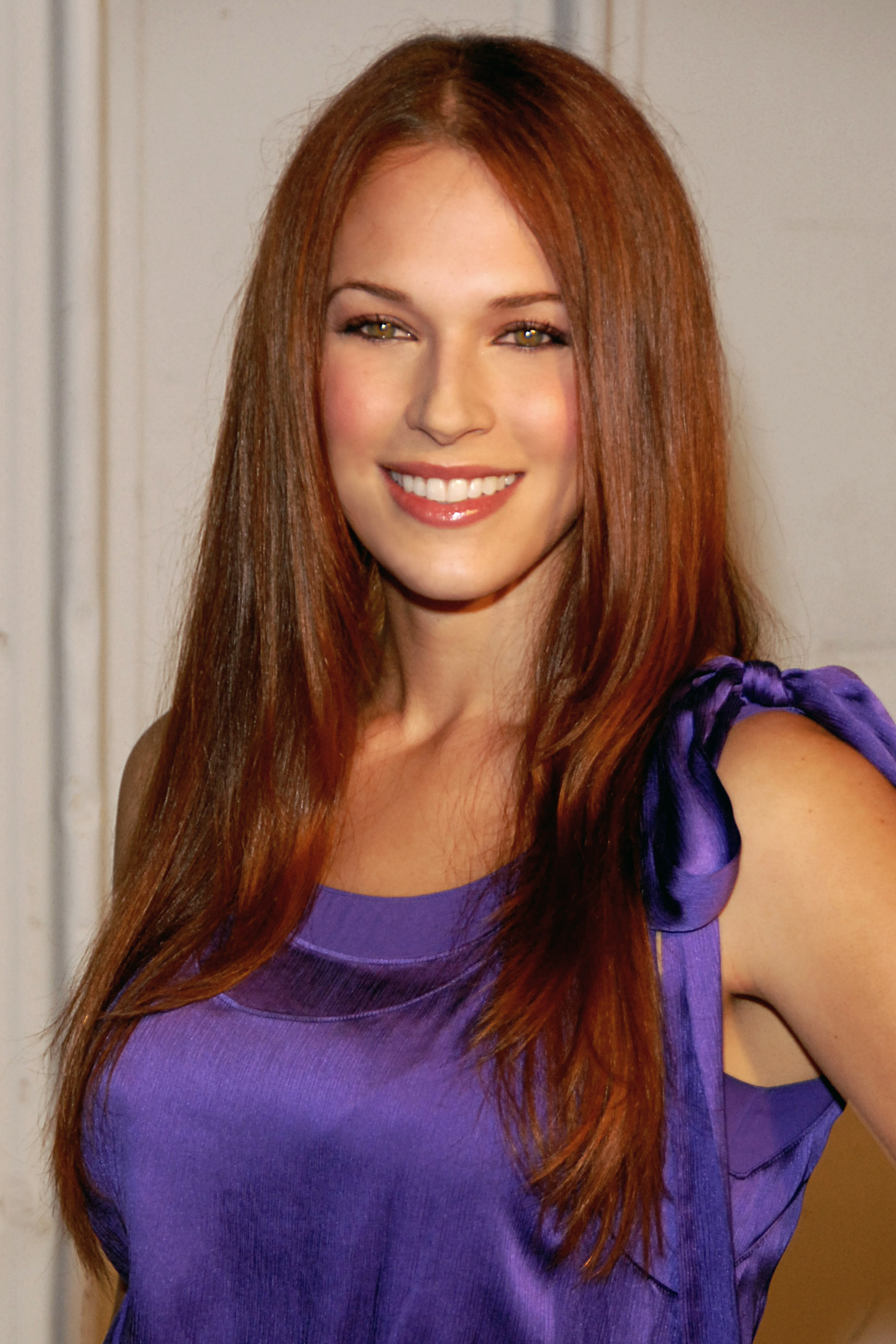
Amanda Righetti

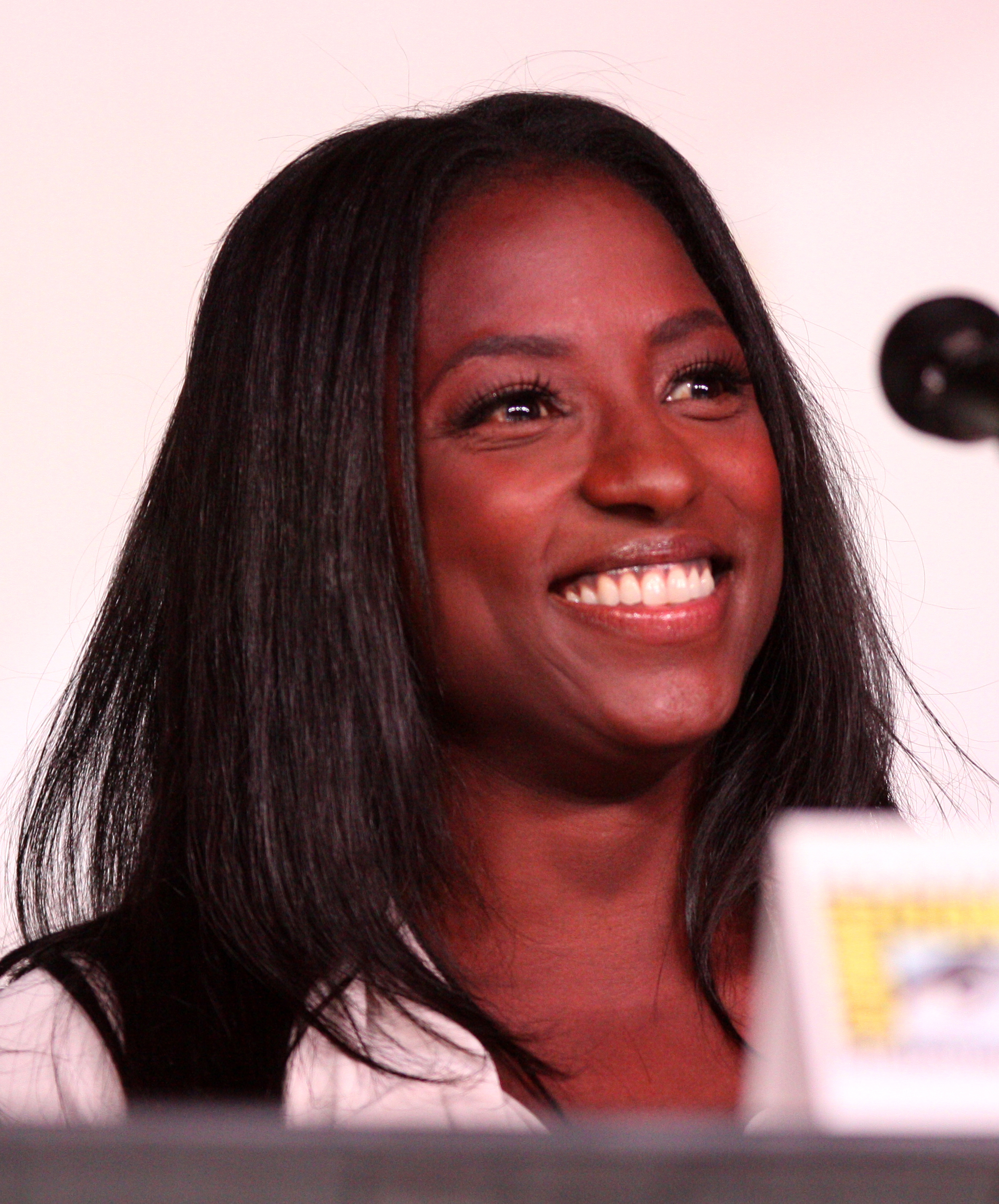
Rutina Wesley

- Lycia Naff (born 1962) – actress, Ensign Sonya Gomez on Star Trek: The Next Generation
- Thomas Ian Nicholas (born 1980) – actor, the American Pie films
- Sean Palmer (born 1973) – actor, singer, dancer
- Sasha Pieterse (born 1996) – teen actress, Alison DiLaurentis on Pretty Little Liars
- Kristoffer Polaha (born 1977) – actor
- Edna Purviance (1895–1958) – actress
- Amanda Righetti (born 1983) – actress, Grace Van Pelt on The Mentalist
- Stephanie Romanov (born 1969) – actress, model, Lilah Morgan on Angel
- Paul Schrier (born 1970) – actor, Bulk on Mighty Morphin Power Rangers
- Jason-Shane Scott (born 1976) – actor
- Dana Snyder (born 1973) – stand-up comedian, actor, voice artist, Master Shake on Aqua Teen Hunger Force
- Shannyn Sossamon (born 1978) – actress, dancer, model, musician
- Bobby Tonelli (born 1975) – actor
- Cerina Vincent (born 1979) – actress, model, Maya on Power Rangers Lost Galaxy
- Carrie Clark Ward (1862–1926) – silent film actress
- Dawn Wells (1938–2020) – actress, business owner, Mary Ann on Gilligan's Island
- Rutina Wesley – actress, Tara Thornton on True Blood
- Lauren Woodland (born 1977) – actress, Brittany Marsino on The Young and the Restless

=== Music ===
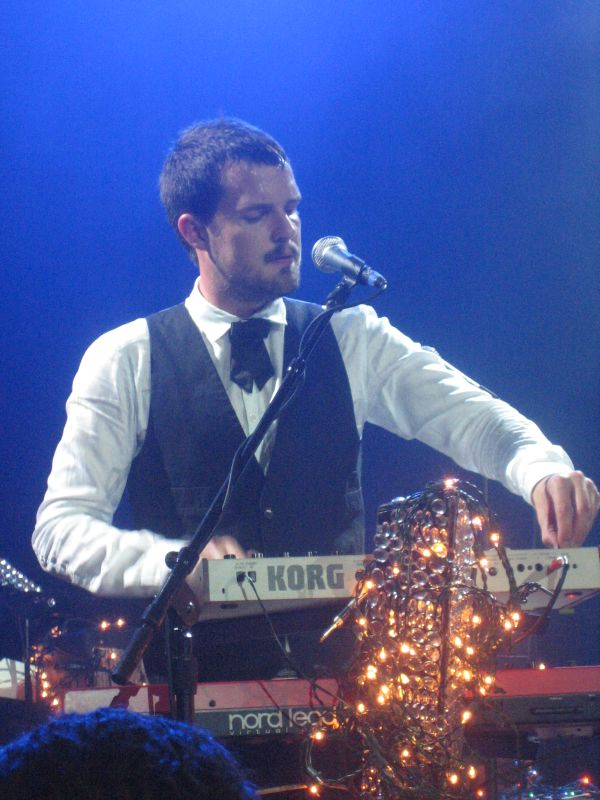
Brandon Flowers

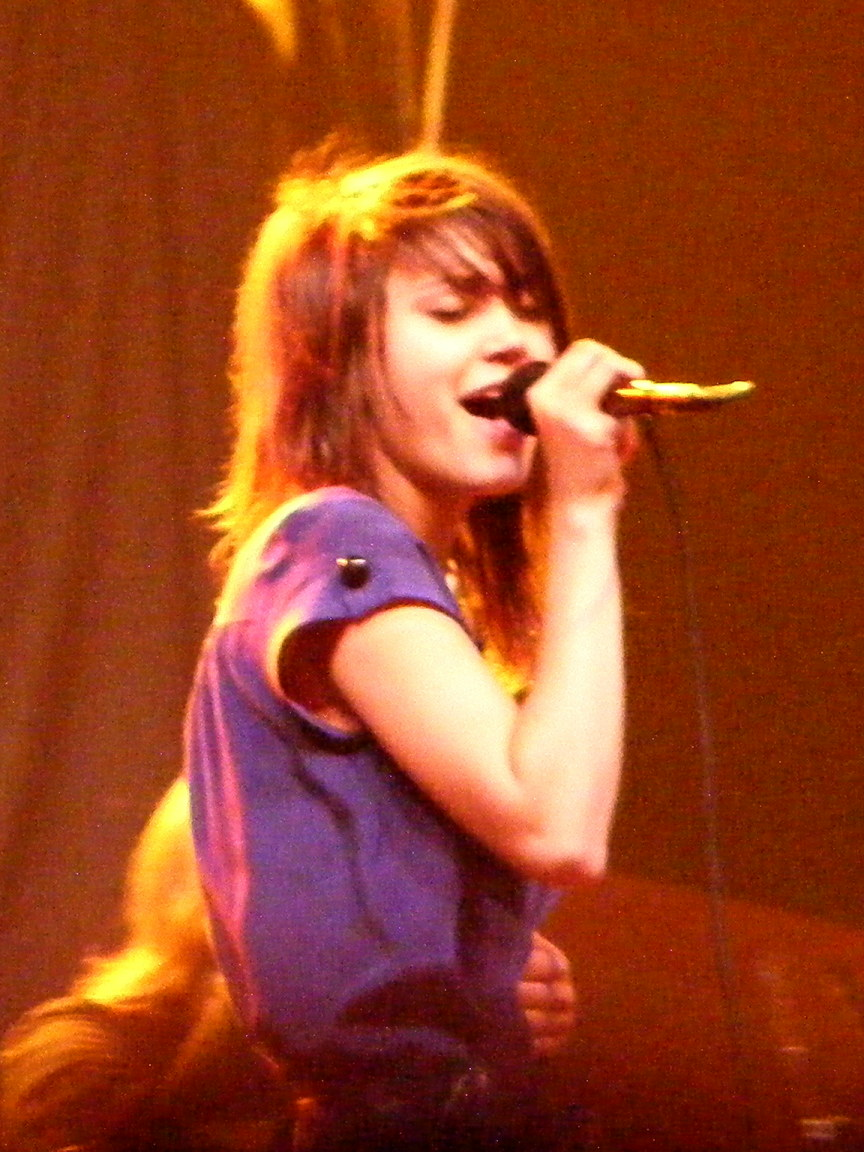
Dia Frampton

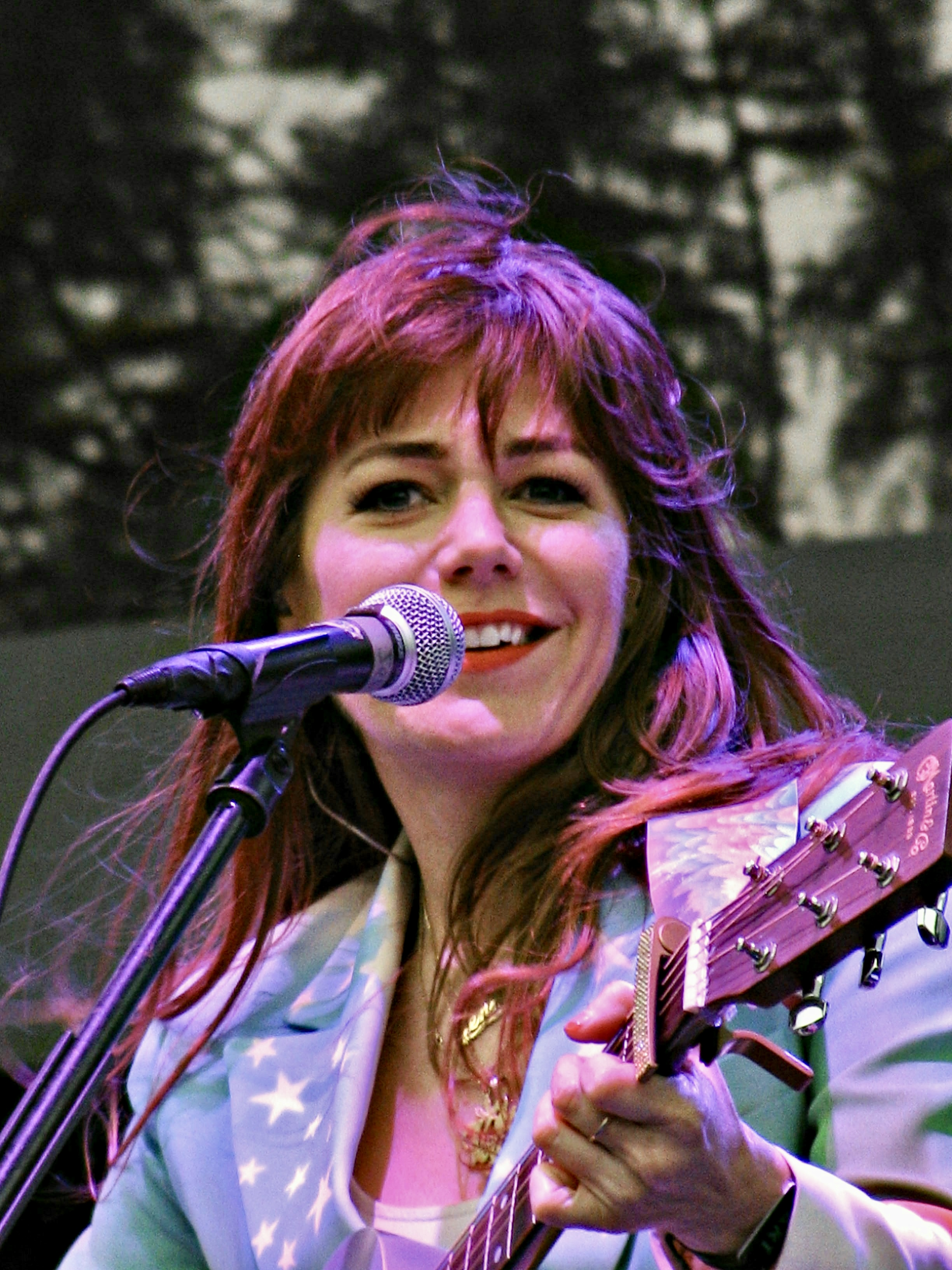
Jenny Lewis

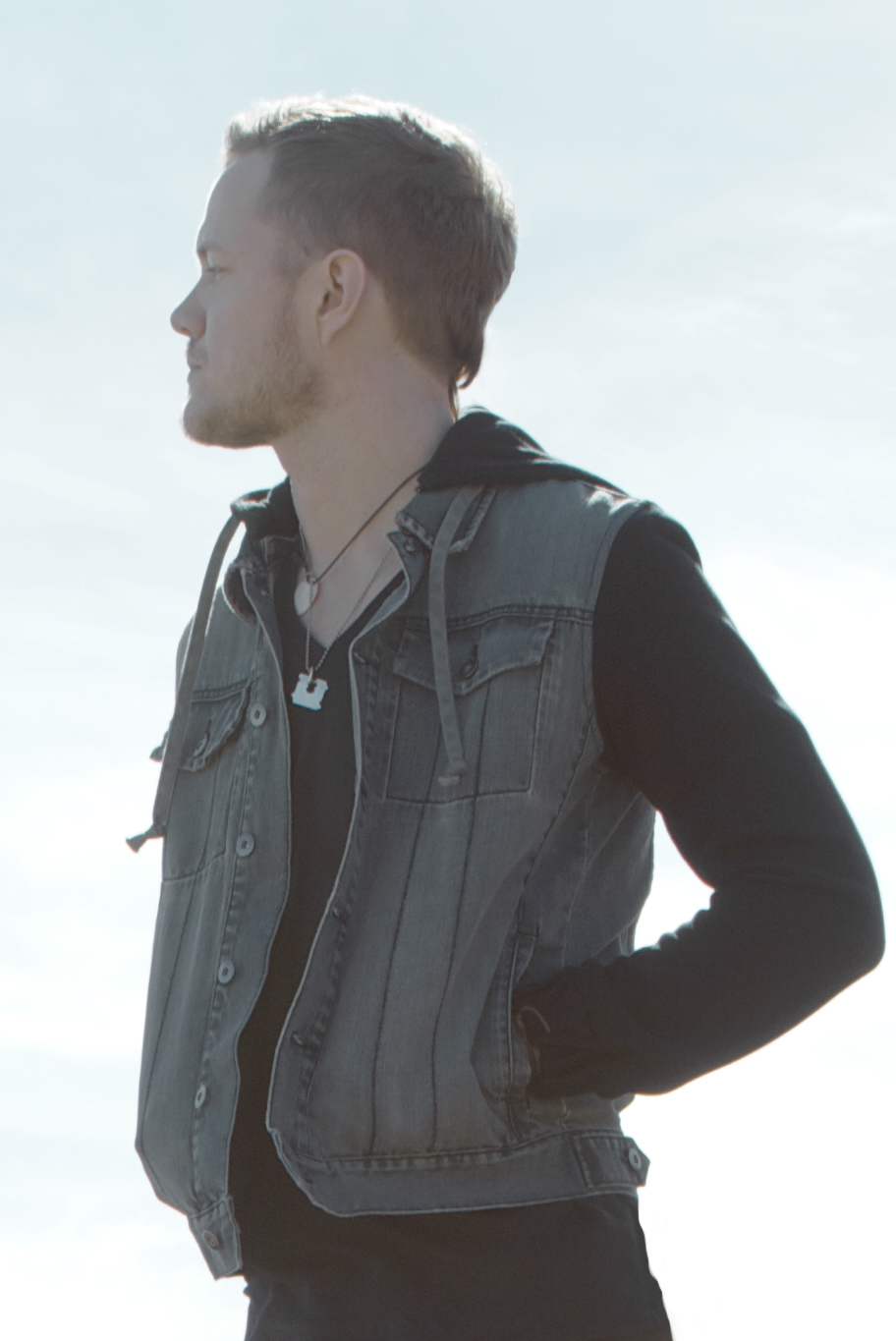
Dan Reynolds

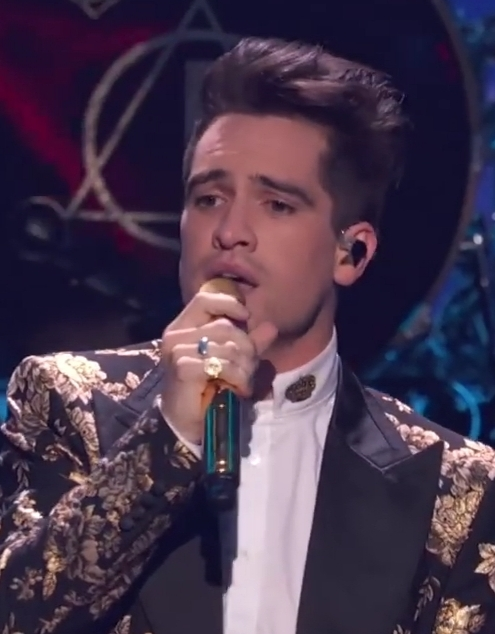
Brendon Urie

- Vernon Alley – jazz bassist
- Amadour – singer-songwriter, pianist, writer, multidisciplinary artist
- Cosmo Baker – New York-based DJ, music producer
- Joyce Collins – jazz pianist, singer
- Rick DeJesus – lead vocals for band Adelitas Way
- Daniel de los Reyes – percussionist
- Dino – DJ, singer-songwriter and record producer
- Leah Dizon – gaijin tarento, singer, and gravure idol in Japan
- Julie Elias – Christian musician
- Baby Keem – rapper
- Renaldo Lapuz – Filipino-American singer
- Brandon Flowers – lead singer of The Killers
- Dia Frampton – indie rock and pop singer
- Tony Fredianelli – alternative rock musician, formerly with Third Eye Blind
- Nicholas Furlong – singer, songwriter, producer
- Mikalah Gordon – singer, American Idol finalist
- Max Green – musician, co-founder of punk rock band Escape the Fate
- Joshua Guerrero – operatic tenor
- Eric Hester – film and TV composer
- Nikki Holland – singer-songwriter
- Antonia Iacobescu – singer, performer, and model
- JGivens – Christian hip hop musician
- Chris Jones – guitarist
- Kaya Jones – pop singer, formerly with The Pussycat Dolls
- Brian Landrus – jazz saxophonist
- Red Leather – singer
- Jenny Lewis – singer
- Jenny Lee Lindberg – bassist for indie band, Warpaint
- Lorie Line – classically trained pianist, composer
- Manika – singer
- Tommy Marth – saxophone player
- Justin McBride – country music singer
- Monte Money – guitarist and vocalist
- Waddie Mitchell – cowboy poet
- Nikki Nelson – country music singer
- Emma Nevada – operatic soprano
- Ne-Yo – R&B singer, songwriter
- Sunny Ozell – singer-songwriter
- Elvis Presley – singer and actor
- Louis Prima Jr – singer, entertainer, trumpeter, and bandleader
- Ronnie Radke – lead singer for Falling in Reverse
- Dan Reynolds – frontman for Imagine Dragons
- Barbara Robison – lead vocalist for The Peanut Butter Conspiracy
- Jim Root – rhythm guitarist for Slipknot
- Ryan Ross – former lead guitarist, lyricist for Panic! at the Disco
- Chuck Ruff – rock drummer
- Lee Scrivner – songwriter
- Kevin Seconds – vocalist, songwriter, musician
- Shamir – singer-songwriter
- Billy Sherwood – progressive rock musician, record producer, and engineer
- Mark Slaughter – singer and musician, founder of the hard rock band Slaughter
- Spencer Smith – drummer for Panic! at the Disco
- Gavin Templeton – modern jazz saxophonist
- Lynn Truell – drummer for Imperial Teen
- Brendon Urie – lead singer for Panic! at the Disco
- Ronnie Vannucci Jr. – drummer for The Killers
- Willy Vlautin – lead singer for Richmond Fontaine
- Eric Whitacre – composer and conductor
- Whitton – singer-songwriter
- David Yow – lead vocalist for Scratch Acid and The Jesus Lizard
- Dolora Zajick – mezzo-soprano
- Asaiah Ziv – hip hop musician

=== Film, stage, television and sound production ===
- Joe Ansolabehere – animation screenwriter and producer
- Kansas Bowling – writer, director, cinematographer, actor
- Gabriel Campisi – author, writer, director, producer
- Glen Charles – Emmy Award-winning television writer
- Les Charles – Emmy Award-winning television writer
- C. Jay Cox (born 1962) – director, screenwriter
- Curtis Hanson – Academy Award-winning filmmaker
- Thomas N. Heffron – screenwriter, director

== Authors ==
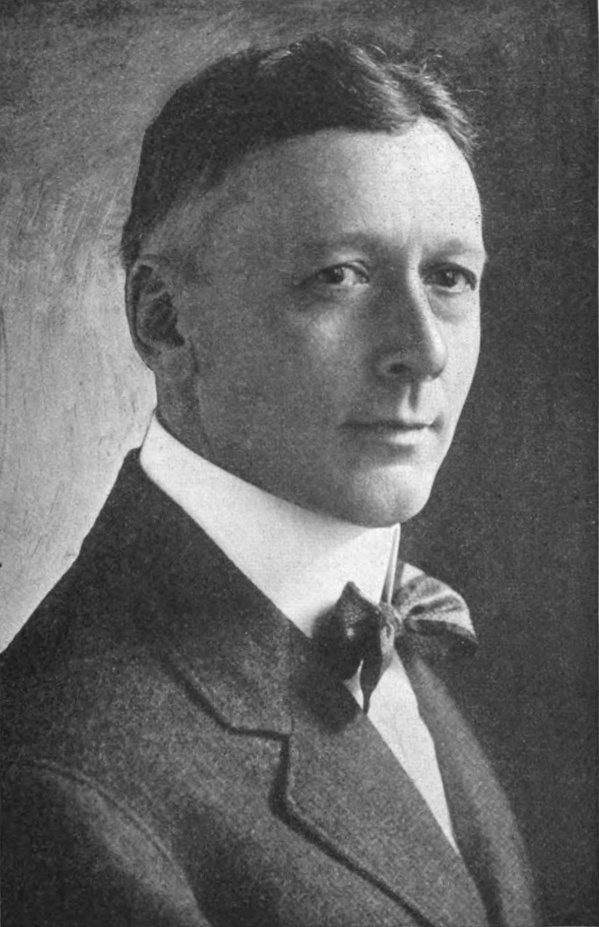
Lute Pease

- Alta – poet, prose writer and publisher
- Nevada Barr – author of mystery novels
- Susan Berman – journalist, daughter of "Davie the Jew" Berman
- Charles Bock – novelist
- Juanita Brooks – author and historian
- Walter van Tilburg Clark – writer
- Cecelia Holland – historical novelist
- Robert Laxalt – writer
- Adrian C. Louis – author and poet
- James Marshall – children's author and illustrator
- Lloyd Osbourne – novelist
- Lute Pease – journalist and cartoonist
- Sheldon Rampton – editor of PR Watch and author of books on the public relations industry
- Geoff Schumacher – journalist and author
- Harry Shannon – novelist
- David Derek Stacton (1925–1968) – author and poet
- Richard Walton Tully – playwright
- Dave Ulrich – author of books on leadership and human resources
- Claire Vaye Watkins – author of the book Battleborn
- Sarah Winnemucca – Northern Paiute author, activist and educator

== Miscellaneous ==
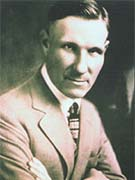
James E. Casey

- Jennifer Allan – model
- Robert Bigelow – businessman
- Johanna Burton – director of the Museum of Contemporary Art, Los Angeles
- James E. Casey (1888–1983) – founder, United Parcel Service (UPS)
- Arianny Celeste – model
- Chumlee – businessman
- Kimberley Conrad – model and former wife of Hugh Hefner
- Laura Dahl – fashion designer
- Milton H. Erickson – psychiatrist specializing in medical hypnosis and family therapy
- George Ferris Jr. – engineer, creator of the Ferris Wheel
- Lorenzo Fertitta – Italian-American entrepreneur, investor and philanthropist
- Sean Hamilton – radio personality
- Jennifer Harman – professional poker player
- Corey Harrison – businessman
- Chelsie Hightower (born 1989) – Latin ballroom dancer, Dancing with the Stars
- David Huntsberger (born 1980) – comedian, co-host of the Professor Blastoff podcast
- Jimmy Kimmel – talk show host and comedian
- Dat So La Lee (1829–1925) – basket weaver
- Jennifer Mabus – YouTuber, hiker, Navy spouse
- Sarah Jim Mayo – Washoe basket weaver
- Tony Mendez (1940–2019) – CIA technical operations officer
- Tana Mongeau – internet personality
- Jessica Nigri – cosplay celebrity, promotional model, YouTuber, voice actress, and fan convention interview correspondent
- Numaga – Paiute leader
- Pierre Omidyar – billionaire founder of eBay
- Angel Porrino – TV personality, showgirl, Holly's World
- Kevin Rose – Internet entrepreneur
- Bob Tallman – news announcer
- Truckee – medicine chief of the Northern Paiute people
- J. Buzz Von Ornsteiner – psychologist and television personality
- Wovoka – Paiute religious leader
- Steve Wynn – casino tycoon; owner of Wynn Resorts Limited

== See also ==
- List of Nevada suffragists
- Lists of Americans
