= Unbroken =

Unbroken may refer to:

== Books and film ==
- Unbroken (book), a 2010 nonfiction book by Laura Hillenbrand about World War II hero Louis Zamperini
- Unbroken (film), a 2014 film based on the Hillenbrand book
- Unbroken: Path to Redemption, a 2018 sequel to the 2014 film
- Unbroken: 13 Stories Starring Disabled Teens, 2018 anthology edited by Marieke Nijkamp
- Unbroken, a memoir by Indrani Mukerjea
- Unbroken: The Untold Story of Shen Yun, a documentary film

== Music ==
- Unbroken (band), an American hardcore punk band

=== Albums ===
- Unbroken (Buddy Tate album), 1970
- Unbroken (Demi Lovato album), 2011
- Unbroken (D-Side album), 2006
- Unbroken (Fiona album), 2011
- Unbroken (Julie Elias album), 2015
- Unbroken (Katharine McPhee album), 2010
- Unbroken (A Perfect Murder album), 2004
- Unbroken (Shannon Noll album), 2018
- Unbroken, by Crematory, 2020
- Unbroken, by New Model Army, upcoming (2024)

=== Songs ===
- "Unbroken" (Bonnie Anderson song), 2015
- "Unbroken" (Tim McGraw song), 2002
- "Unbroken" (María Ólafsdóttir song), 2015
- "Unbroken" (Stan Walker song), 2010
- "Unbroken", by Black Veil Brides from Avengers Assemble: Music from and Inspired by the Motion Picture
- "Unbroken", by Impending Doom from The Sin and Doom Vol. II
- "Unbroken", by Killswitch Engage from As Daylight Dies
- "Unbroken", by Demi Lovato from Unbroken
- "Unbroken", by The Stranglers from Suite XVI
- "The Unbroken", by Lovebites from Electric Pentagram

== Other uses ==
- HMS Unbroken, a Royal Navy U-class submarine
- Unbroken (horse), a horse that has never been ridden
- UNBROKEN Center, the largest medical facility in Ukraine, part of the First Lviv Medical Union
