= D-Side =

Irish boy band

- Origin: Ireland
- Genre: Pop
- Years active: 2001–2006
- Labels: Polydor, Avex
- Past members: Damien (Dane) Guiden; Derek Moran; Shane Creevey; Elroy Cahill; Damien Bowe; Derek Ryan
- Website: dsideofficial.com

D-Side were an Irish boy band established in 2001 by Irish twin doctors Rory and Eoghan Mac Sweeney and signed by Clive Black at Edel Records. The group got a recording contract in Japan with Avex. They enjoyed success in Japan, Ireland, and Europe, winning 'Best New Band Award' at the Smash Hits Tour in 2002 and scoring 3 UK Top Tens.

The group was made up of five members, Derek Ryan (who performed under the alias Ryan O'Riain), Derek Moran, Damien "Dane" Guiden, Shane Creevey and Damien Bowe. The band released their first single "Stronger Together" in Ireland only, which reached No. 5 on the Irish charts. The group then released "Speechless", achieving three top 10 singles in the UK/Ireland and some around Europe. They supported Blue, Westlife and many other groups on tour during 2001 and 2002, before headlining their own live shows, as well as being involved in many charity events such as Soccer Magic, Soccer 6, Children in Need and ChildLine. In 2006, D-Side took part in the international contest "New Wave" in Jūrmala. They released three albums in Japan, and a greatest hits compilation through the Japanese record label Avex. After their split, Moran went on to present Milkshake! on Channel 5.

== History ==
=== 2001–2003: Stronger Together ===
Stronger Together was the title of the first album written by Red Rhythm a.k.a. Simon Britton, Cliff Randall and Tara McDonald. It was released in 2003 by Polydor UK. The album was a hit in many countries, including the UK, Ireland, Germany, France and China, reaching the top 10 in those countries. The album contained five singles. The first single, titled "Stronger Together", was released only in Ireland and reached No. 5. The second single was "Speechless", released internationally, gaining some success in Europe and Asia. The single reached the top 10 on the UK Singles Chart (#9). In the other countries, it reached the top 40. The third single was "Invisible", released in late 2003 which reached No. 7 in the UK. The song was also a hit in Europe and Asia, reaching the top 5 in countries such as China, Ireland and France. The song was later covered by Clay Aiken. The fourth single, "Real World", was released in February 2004. It reached No. 4 in Ireland and No. 9 in the UK. The fifth and final single was "Pushin' Me Out", released in April 2004. It reached No. 21 in the UK.

=== 2004–2006: Gravity and Unbroken ===
Gravity was the second album from the group, released by Avex/Polydor. The group had become a trio by this time. The album peaked at No. 10 in China, but generated less interest elsewhere, only reaching No. 20 in Ireland, and landing within the top 40 in France and Germany. The album contained three singles, but only one was released in Europe. "One More Night Alone" missed the top 40 in France and Germany, and in China peaked at No. 27. The next single was "Sacrifice", a pop-ballad duet with Antony Costa, which was released only in Japan and China. It reached No. 1 on the Chinese charts. The third single, "Who Wants the World", was only released in Japan.

Their third and final album, Unbroken, was released on 28 October 2006. "No One" is an unreleased track written by Bryan Adams.

== Discography ==
=== Studio albums ===
Album details	Peak chart positions	
Album details	JPN	UK
Stronger Together: Release date: 2003; Label:	—	62
Gravity: Release date: 2005; Label:	271	—
Unbroken: Release date: 2006; Label:	58	—

=== Compilation albums ===
Album details	Peak chart positions	
Album details	JPN	UK
Best of D-Side 2004–2008: Release date: 2008; Label:	154	—

=== DVDs ===
Album details	Peak chart positions
Album details	JPN
Gravity – Deluxe Edition Bonus DVD: Release date: 2005; Label:	271

=== Singles ===
Release date	Single	Peak positions	
Release date	Single	IRE	UK
July 2002	"Stronger Together"	5	—
April 2003	"Speechless"	8	9
July 2003	"Invisible"	5	7
January 2004	"Real World"	4	9
March 2004	"Pushin' Me Out"	—	21
January 2005	"One More Night Alone"	—	—
July 2005	"Sacrifice"	—	—
March 2006	"Unbroken"	—	—
