= Julie Elias =

American Christian musician

- Born: Julie Marie Elias; Santa Clara County, California
- Origin: Dallas, Texas
- Genres: Worship, CCM, Christian rock, Christian alternative rock, indie pop, indie rock
- Occupations: Singer, songwriter
- Instruments: vocals, singer-songwriter
- Years active: 2011–present
- Website: julieeliasmusic.com

Julie Marie Elias is an American Christian musician, who primarily plays an indie pop and indie rock style of worship music. She has released four studio albums, A Wild Rose in 2012, Holy Night in 2013, Love Rain Down in 2014, and, Unbroken in 2015.

== Early and personal life ==
Julie Marie Elias was born in Santa Clara County, California, to father Robert Charles "Bob" Elias and mother Dell Marie Elias (née, Wogsland). She has a younger sister, Kristen Dell Elias, who's a fitness instructor. They were raised near Reno, Nevada in the area of Lake Tahoe, Nevada.

== Music career ==
Julie began performing with a focus on acting, appearing in shows like Grey's Anatomy. Her music recording career began in 2011, with the studio album, A Wild Rose, that was released on November 13, 2012, independently. The subsequent album, a Christmas music album, Holy Night, was released independently, on November 19, 2013. She released, Love Rain Down, on August 26, 2014, also independently. Her fourth album, Unbroken, will be releasing on September 8, 2015.

== Personal life ==
Elias now resides in Dallas, Texas, where she is pursuing her music career and ministry.

== Discography ==
Studio albums

- A Wild Rose (November 13, 2012)
- Holy Night (November 19, 2013)
- Love Rain Down (August 26, 2014)
- Unbroken (September 8, 2015)
