= Nikki Holland =

American singer-songwriter

- Origin: Detroit, Michigan, U.S.
- Genres: Reggae fusion, pop, indie
- Years active: 2012–present

Nikki Holland is an American queer indie reggae pop singer-songwriter. She performs both as a solo artist and with her backing band, The Dirty Elizabeths. Active since 2012, Holland has released multiple independent singles and albums, blending reggae, pop, and rock influences. She has performed at major LGBTQ+ festivals across the United States and Canada, including Club Skirts' The Dinah Shore.

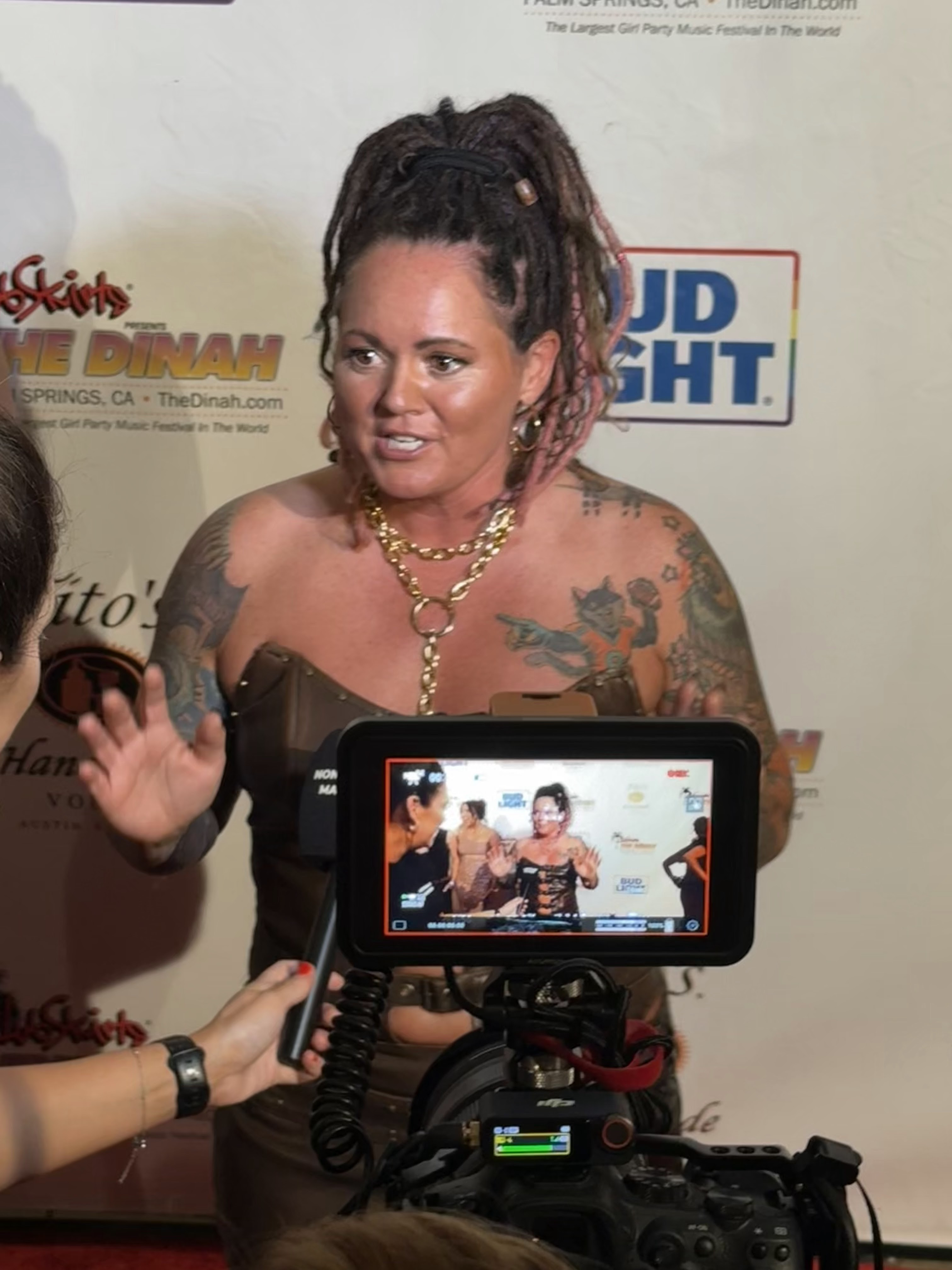
Holland on the Red Carpet at Dinah 2025

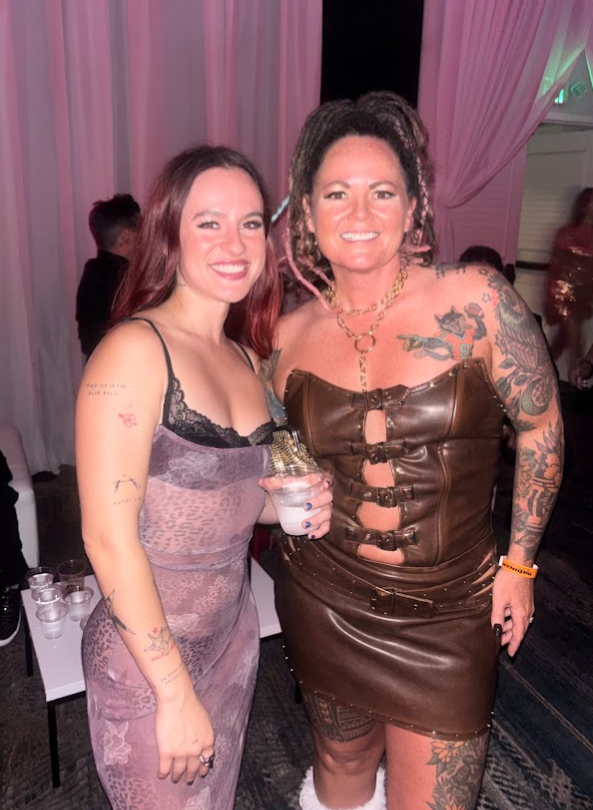
Holland and Canadian Musician Xana

== Early life ==
Holland (born Las Vegas, Nevada) began performing in Virginia before relocating to New Mexico and eventually Detroit, Michigan. Her early musical influences included reggae, rock, and Americana, which later shaped her fusion-focused sound.

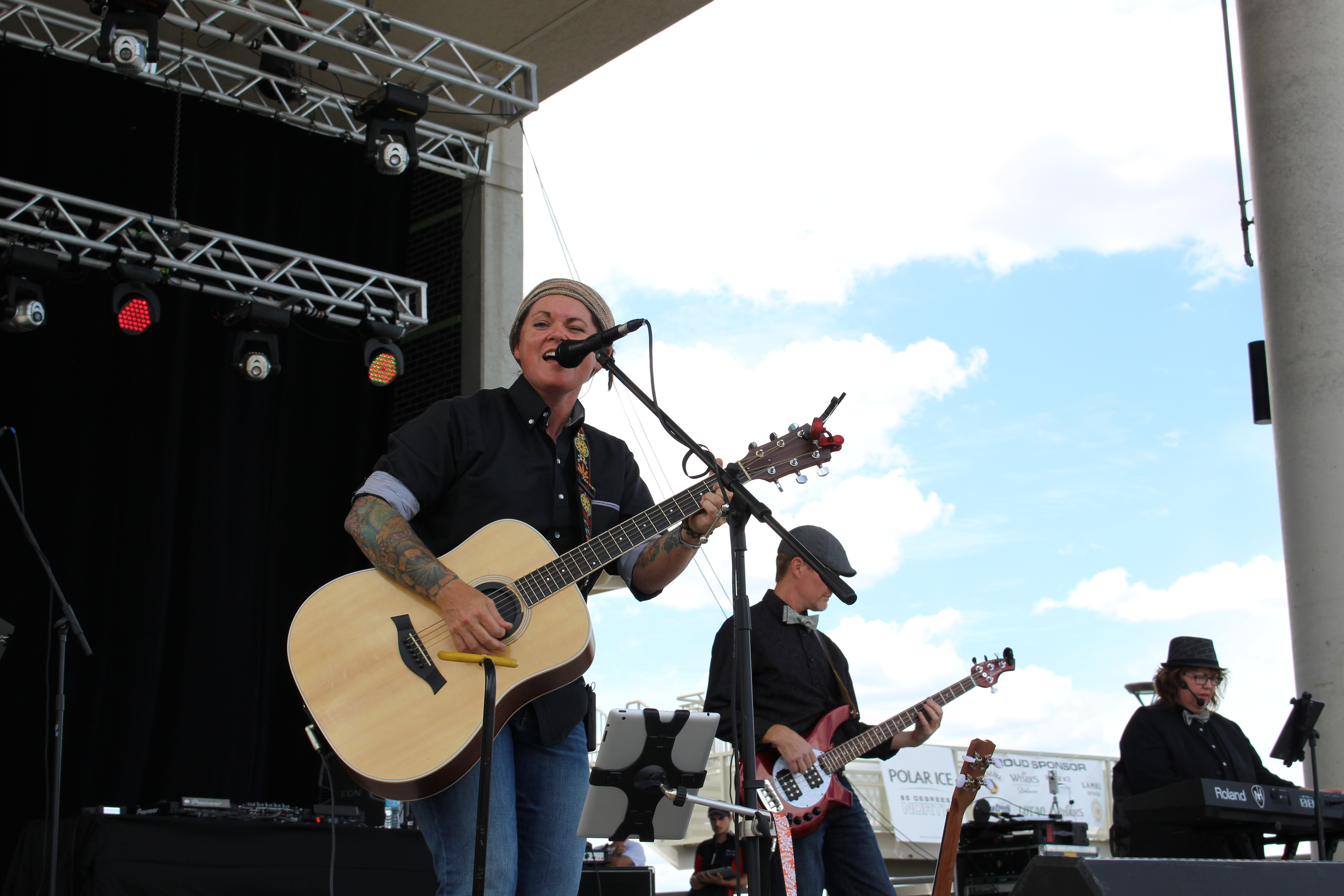
Holland & The Dirty Elizabeths at Windsor-Essex Pride Fest

== Career ==
Holland released her debut album, Hold On, in 2012, followed by Americana Made in 2017, and Sunshine on the High Road, in 2021, which marked a shift toward a reggae-pop fusion style that has since defined her work.

From 2024 to 2025, Holland has released a series of singles that expanded her sound and visibility.

Holland has collaborated with several artists and musicians throughout her career. Her track Another Shot featured reggae artist OC Roberts, while “Tootsie” included a collaboration with pop artist Alisabeth Von Presley. She has also worked with brass musicians Ken Roberts and Chris Kaercher on various recordings and performances. She has also appeared as a special guest performer at the Paramount Theatre in Cedar Rapids, Iowa, for the annual Christmas in the Key of A production with Alisabeth Von Presley.

In addition to recording, Holland performs both as a solo artist and with her backing band as Nikki Holland & The Dirty Elizabeths. Her live shows often blend original music with reggae-influenced arrangements and pop performance elements.

Holland was interviewed for the forthcoming documentary on The Dinah, highlighting the transition of the festival’s production after 34 years under Mariah Hanson.

== Social activism ==
Performing several charity shows yearly, Holland makes social statements in her music and encourages supporting small businesses.

== Live performances and festivals ==
Holland has performed at a range of LGBTQ+ festivals, pride events, and independent music showcases across the United States and Canada. Her appearances at The Dinah, the long-running Palm Springs music festival, have helped expand her national audience.

In addition to performing, Holland has produced and curated music events. She founded and organized the Saugatuck LGBT Music Fest in Fennville, Michigan, and has produced the women’s festival Music in the Valley in Owendale, Michigan.

== Musical style and influences ==
Holland’s sound blends reggae, pop, rock, and indie influences, often incorporating upbeat rhythms with melodic hooks and lyrical themes tied to identity, relationships, and community. Her work has evolved from earlier Americana influences into a reggae-pop fusion that reflects both her songwriting roots and performance-driven style.

As a queer frontwoman, Holland frequently performs with her backing band, while also appearing as a solo artist. Her live shows emphasize audience connection, collaboration with other musicians, and elements of pop performance. Holland’s approach to music promotion and support of other artists has been cited as a factor in her reputation within festival and indie circuits.

== Discography ==
=== Albums ===
- "Sunshine on the High Road" (2021)
- "Americana Made" (2017)
- "Hold On" (2012)

=== Albums ===
- Sunshine on the High Road (2021)
- Americana Made (2017)
- Hold On (2012)

=== Singles ===
- "Bad Day" (2025)
- "Roleplay" (2025)
- "Best Friend Like" (2025)
- "Block Em" (2025)
- "Her Favorite Tune" (2025)
- "Unshakeable" (2025)
- "Fix It" (2025)
- "I Don't Know How to Save You" (2025)
- "Christmas Slay" (2024)
- "My Crew" (2024)
- "Love in Color" (2024)
- "Tootsie" (2024)
- "Coco Suave" (2024)
- "Gumdrop" (2024)

- Beautiful (feat. Jamal "King Mellowman" Clarke) (2023)
- Love in Color (2022)
- Borrowed Time (2022)
- Bee Dum Bum Who (feat. King Mellowman & Chris Kaercher) (2021)
