= Lute Pease =

American cartoonist

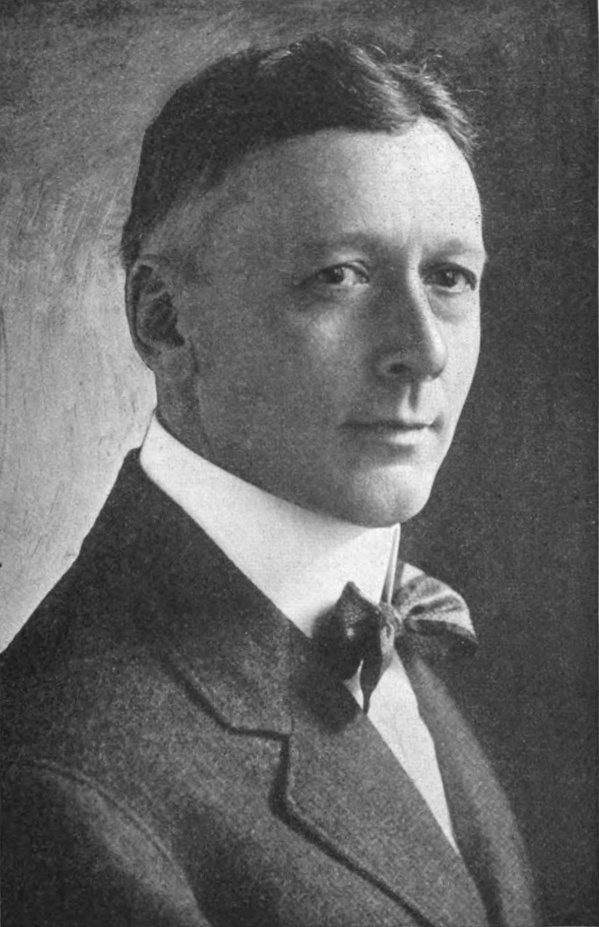
- Born: March 27, 1869; Winnemucca, Nevada, U.S.
- Died: August 16, 1963 (aged 94); Maplewood, New Jersey, U.S.
- Known for: Cartooning
- Awards: Pulitzer Prize for Editorial Cartooning (1949)

Lucius Curtis "Lute" Pease Jr. (March 27, 1869 – August 16, 1963), was an American editorial cartoonist and journalist. He was cartoonist for the Newark Evening News from 1914 to 1954, and received the 1949 Pulitzer Prize for Editorial Cartooning

Born in Winnemucca, Nevada, to parents Lucius Curtis Pease and Mary Isabel (Hutton) Pease, Lute was one of five children. From the age of five he was raised by grandparents in Charlotte, Vermont, after the death of his parents. He graduated from the Franklin Academy in Malone, New York, in 1887, and moved out west, where he worked for several years as a ranch-hand in California, miner in Colorado, horticultural salesman and bicycle shop manager in Oregon. He took part in the Klondike Gold Rush, and was an occasional correspondent for the Seattle Post-Intelligencer between 1897 and 1901. He was then cartoonist and reporter for the Portland Oregonian from 1902 to 1905, where he published a notable interview with Mark Twain which Twain later praised as "the most accurate and best ever written of me." He joined The Pacific Monthly as assistant editor in 1906, becoming editor in 1907. In 1912, Pease married artist Nell Christmas McMullin, and joined the Newark Evening News in 1914. He received the Pulitzer Prize for a 1948 cartoon commenting on nationwide coal strikes by John L. Lewis.

Pease was also a painter, and his portrait of artist Henry Rankin Poore was displayed at the National Academy of Design. He retired from newspaper work in 1954 and continued painting. He died in Maplewood, New Jersey on August 16, 1963, at the age of 94. His papers are on file at the Huntington Library.

Select cartoons
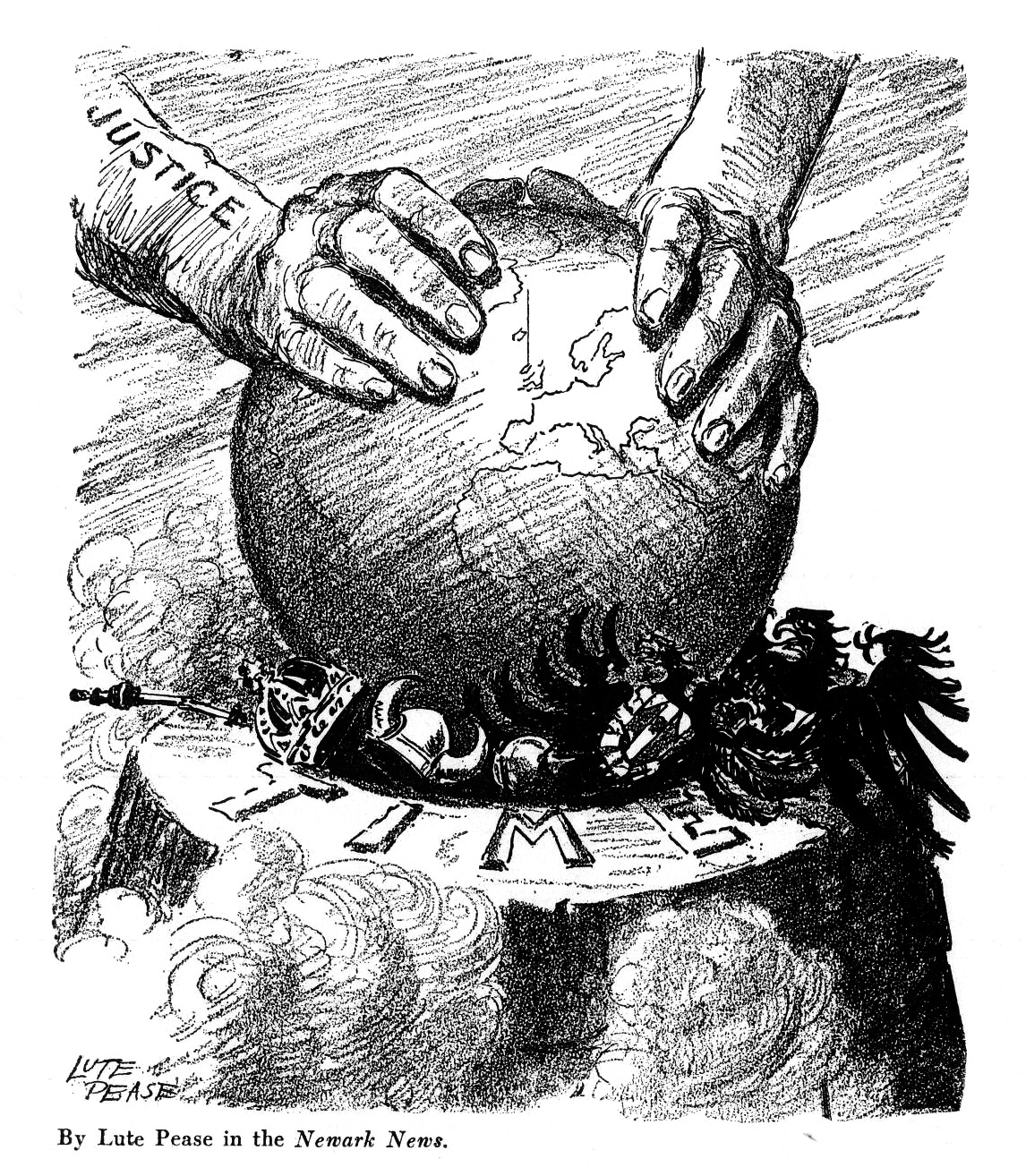
"Though the mills of God grind slowly", World War I cartoon

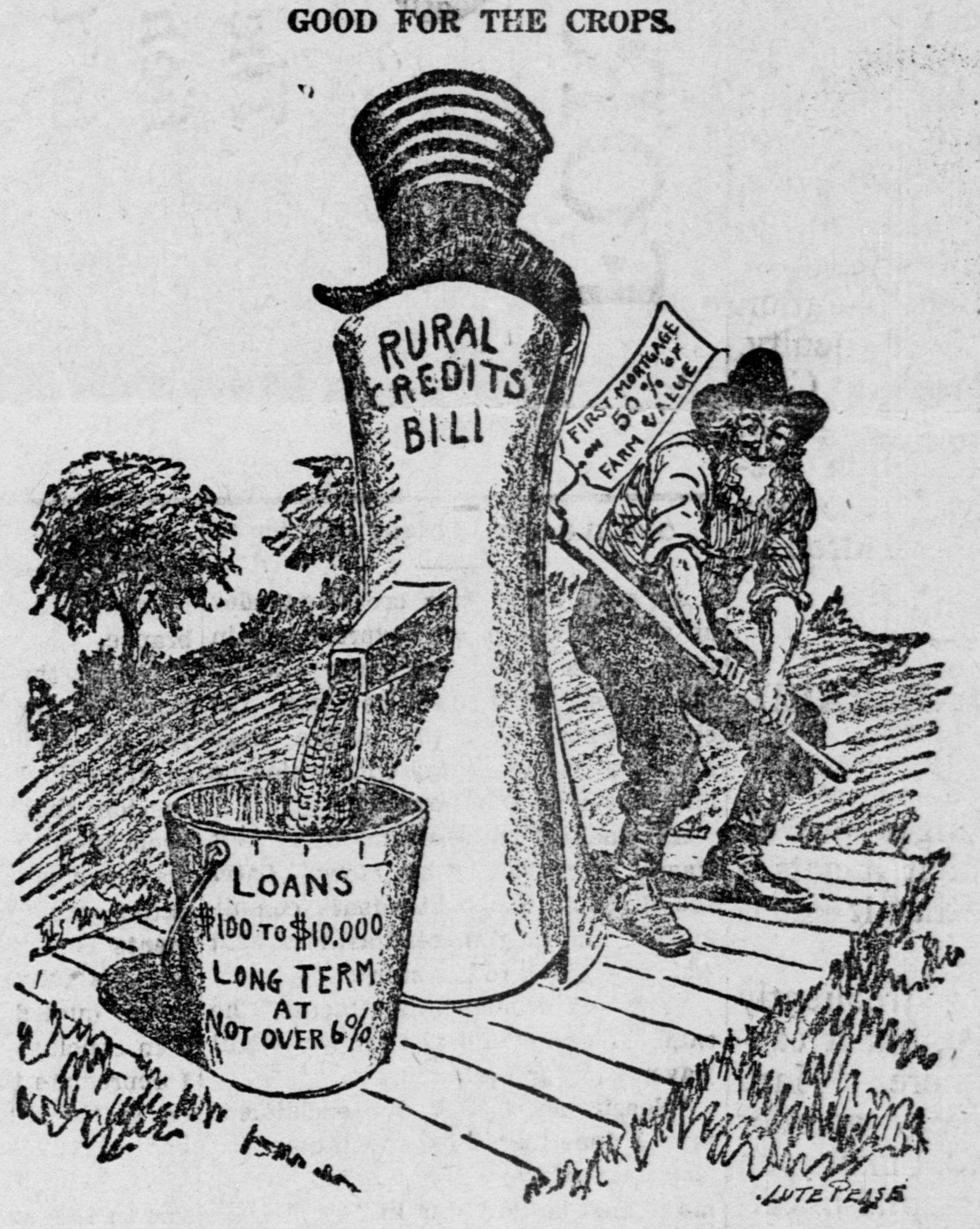
1916 cartoon on the Federal Farm Loan Act

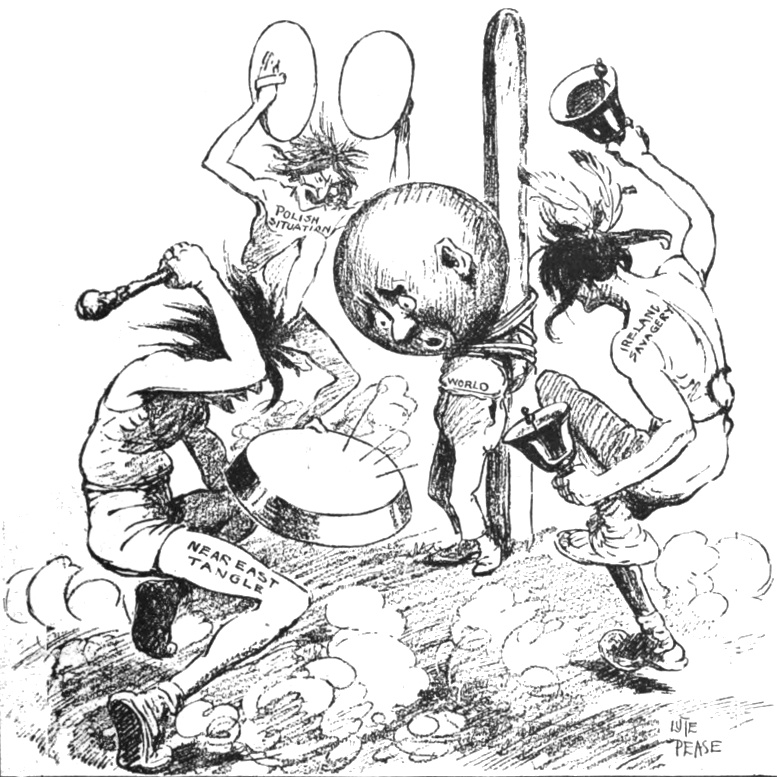
"The Ghost Dance!" (1921)

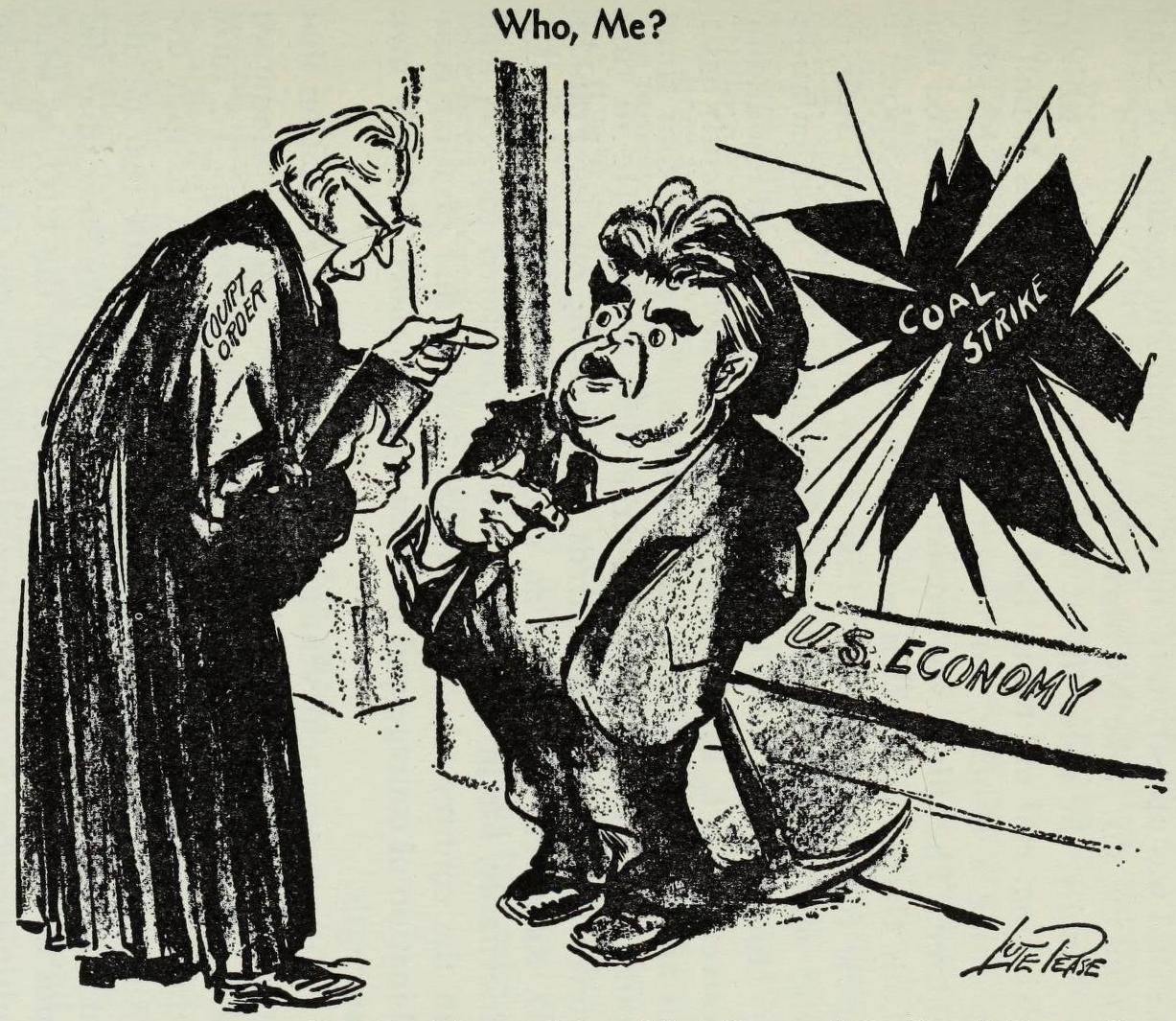
"Who, Me?", winner of the 1949 Pulitzer Prize
