= Unbroken (D-Side album) =

Studio album by D-Side
- Released: 25 October 2006
- Recorded: 2005–2006
- Genre: Pop
- Length: 59:02
- Label: Avex Trax, Concept Records
- Producer: Phil Thornalley, Colin Campsie, Anders Hansson, Simon Perry, Dave James, Kai McKenzie, Tim Hart, Alan Glass, Sandi Stimlain

D-Side chronology
Gravity (2005)	Unbroken (2006)	Best of D-Side 2004-2008 (2008)

Singles from Unbroken
- 1. "Unbroken" Released: 29 September 2006; 2. "Let Me Be the One" Released: 11 December 2006

Unbroken is the third studio album by Irish boy band D-Side. The album was released on 25 October 2006 in Japan, and later released via the iTunes Store worldwide on 3 March 2008. The album peaked at number 58 on the Japanese album charts. Two singles were released from the album: the title track, "Unbroken", and "Let Me Be the One" (which serves as a promotional release only; no official music video was recorded for the song).

== Background ==
"No One" was an unreleased track written by Bryan Adams. The album features writing contributions from a number of well-known songwriters, including two songs penned by Steve Mac and Wayne Hector ("Missing You" and "Then You Kissed Me"; the latter of which was an unreleased song by fellow boyband Westlife). The album's title track was also co-written by Phil Thornalley, famous for his work on Natalie Imbruglia's debut "Left of the Middle". The band co-wrote the mid-tempo ballad "Fly" with songwriter Kai McKenzie, who produced several tracks for the album. The original Japanese release includes four tracks omitted from the worldwide digital release, including the Mac-Hector "Then You Kissed Me".

== Track listing ==
No.	Title	Writer(s)	Producer(s)	Length
1.	"Unbroken"	Phil Thornalley • Colin Campsie • Anders Hansson	Thornalley • Campsie • Hansson	3:21
2.	"Let Me Be the One"	Simon Perry • Mats Petersson	Perry • Petersson	3:46
3.	"Mother's Son"	Campsie • Martin Hedstorm	Thornalley • Hedstorm	3:53
4.	"Dare to Dream"	Perry • David Thomas • Don Black	Perry	4:50
5.	"No One"	Thornalley • Bryan Adams • Jörgen Elofsson	Thornalley	3:19
6.	"Bullet Proof"	John McLaughlin • Dave James • Tom Gilbert • Julian Emery	James	3:50
7.	"Missing You"	Perry • Steve Mac • Wayne Hector	Perry	4:20
8.	"Never Too Young"	Alan Glass • Sandi Stimlain • Nick Staton	Glass • Stimlain	3:26
9.	"My Faith in You"	McLaughlin • James • Maeve O'Boyle	James	3:40
10.	"Fly"	Creevey • O'Riain • Moran • Kai McKenzie	McKenzie	4:08
11.	"Million Ways"	McKenzie • Hans-Peter Aaserud	McKenzie	4:00
12.	"Misunderstood"	McKenzie • Tim Hart	McKenzie • Hart	2:54

Japanese bonus tracks
No.	Title	Writer(s)	Producer(s)	Length
13.	"Fragile Heart"	McLaughlin • James • O'Boyle	James
14.	"My Saving Grace"	McLaughlin • James • O'Boyle • Alan Ross	James
15.	"Then You Kissed Me"	Perry • Mac • Hector	Perry
16.	"Tokyo"	O'Riain	McKenzie

== Personnel ==
(Credits adapted from AllMusic and Unbroken's liner notes.)

- Ryan O' Riain - vocalist
- Derek Moran – vocalist
- Shane Creevey – vocalist
- Phil Thornalley - producer

== Charts ==
Chart (2006)	Peak position
Japanese Albums Chart	58

== Release history ==
Country	Date	Format(s)	Label
Japan	25 October 2006	CD, digital download	Avex Trax
United Kingdom	3 March 2008	digital download	Concept Records
