= Unbroken (Julie Elias album) =

Studio album by Julie Elias
- Released: September 8, 2015
- Genre: Worship, CCM, Christian rock, Christian alternative rock, indie pop, indie rock
- Length: 49:54

Julie Elias chronology
Love Rain Down (2014)	Unbroken (2015)

Unbroken is the fourth studio album by Julie Elias. She released the album on September 8, 2015.

== Critical reception ==
Professional ratings
Review scores
Source	Rating
365 Days of Inspiring Media	4.5/5 stars
New Release Today	3.5/5 stars

Awarding the album three and a half stars from New Release Today, Caitlin Lassiter states, "One of the strongest points in Unbroken is that the album offers a variation of styles, with rock, pop and worship all being represented. Another great aspect of the album is Julie's songwriting, which shines a deep vulnerability that's rare and appreciated. Being a relatively new indie artist, Julie is just getting started in the CCM industry, but with the elements she displays in Unbroken, it's clear that she has big things ahead." Jonathan Andre, giving the album four and a half stars at 365 Days of Inspiring Media, writes, "the album is great production-wise. With powerful drums and a vocal that I reckon is one of the most underrated in the Christian indie music industry; Julie’s new album is one to treasure if you are a fan of indie worship music, CCM, pop, or a combination of the three."

== Track listing ==
Track list
No.	Title	Length
1.	"Burning Bright"	4:32
2.	"Home"	4:04
3.	"Unbroken"	3:07
4.	"Butterfly"	3:30
5.	"I Will love Again"	5:01
6.	"Stop Before I Start"	3:53
7.	"The Choice"	2:53
8.	"Why"	3:07
9.	"I Won't Cry"	3:49
10.	"The Love of the Lord Endures"	4:19
11.	"Breathing Room"	3:41
12.	"It Is Well"	7:58
Total length:		49:54
