= Index of Nevada-related articles =

The location of the State of Nevada in the United States of America

The following is an alphabetical list of articles related to the U.S. State of Nevada.

== 0–9 ==
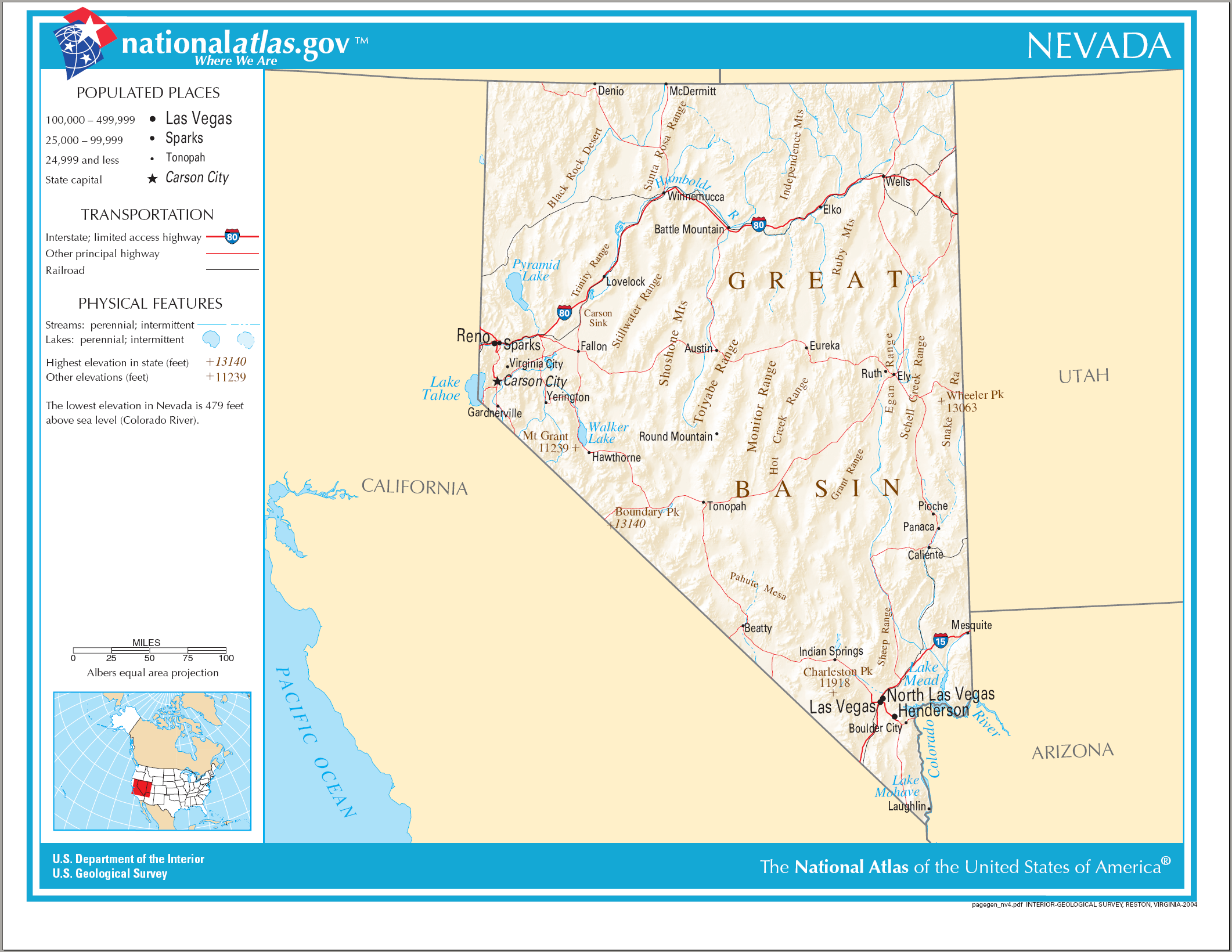
An enlargeable map of the State of Nevada

- .nv.us – Internet second-level domain for the state of Nevada
- 36th state to join the United States of America

== A ==
- Adjacent states:
  - State of Arizona
  - State of California
  - State of Idaho
  - State of Oregon
  - State of Utah
- Agriculture in Nevada
- Airports in Nevada
- Amusement parks in Nevada
- Aquaria in Nevada
  - commons:Category:Aquaria in Nevada
- Arboreta in Nevada
  - commons:Category:Arboreta in Nevada
- Archaeology of Nevada
  - Category:Archaeological sites in Nevada
    - commons:Category:Archaeological sites in Nevada
- Architecture of Nevada
- Art museums and galleries in Nevada
  - commons:Category:Art museums and galleries in Nevada
- Astronomical observatories in Nevada
  - commons:Category:Astronomical observatories in Nevada

== B ==
- Black Rock Desert
- Botanical gardens in Nevada
  - commons:Category:Botanical gardens in Nevada
- Buildings and structures in Nevada
  - commons:Category:Buildings and structures in Nevada
- Burning Man

== C ==
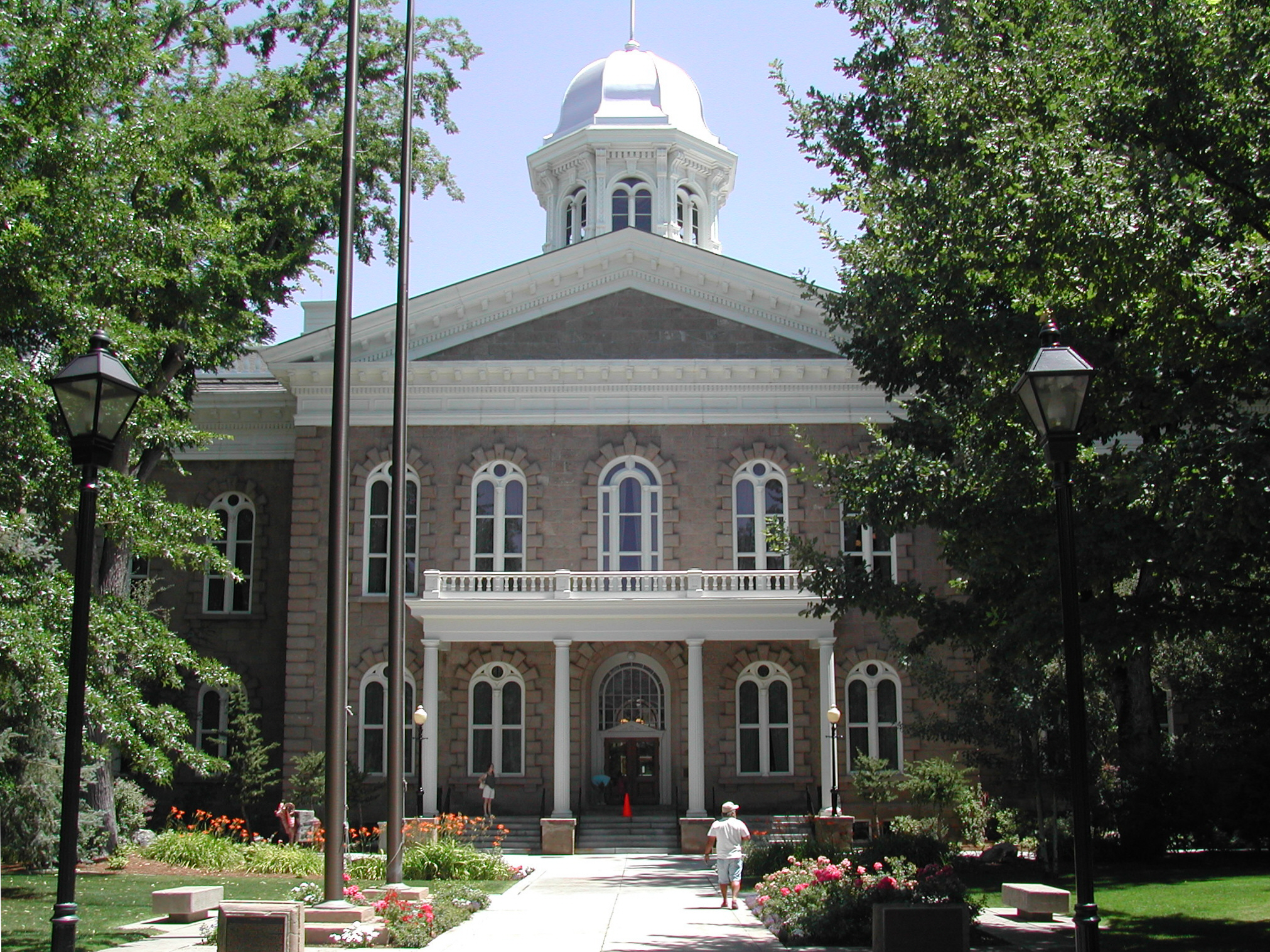
The Nevada State Capitol in Carson City

- Canyons and gorges of Nevada
  - commons:Category:Canyons and gorges of Nevada
- Capital of the State of Nevada
- Capitol of the State of Nevada
  - commons:Category:Nevada State Capitol
- Carson City, Nevada, territorial and state capital since 1861
- Casinos in Nevada
- Caves of Nevada
  - commons:Category:Caves of Nevada
- Census statistical areas of Nevada
- Cities in Nevada
  - commons:Category:Cities in Nevada

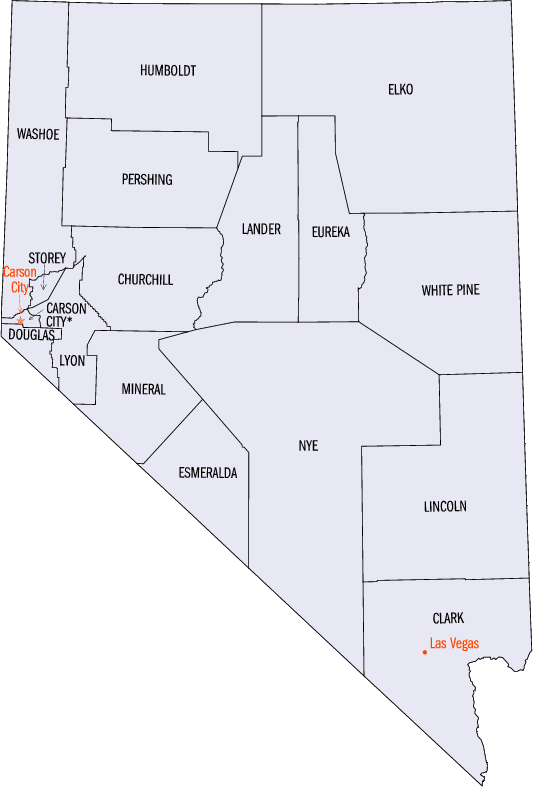
An enlargeable map of the 16 counties and 1 independent city of the state of Nevada

- Climate of Nevada
- Climate change in Nevada
- Colleges and universities in Nevada
  - commons:Category:Universities and colleges in Nevada
- Colorado River
- Communications in Nevada
  - commons:Category:Communications in Nevada
- Companies in Nevada
- Congressional districts of Nevada
- Constitution of the State of Nevada
- Convention centers in Nevada
  - commons:Category:Convention centers in Nevada
- Counties of the state of Nevada
  - commons:Category:Counties in Nevada
- Culture of Nevada
  - commons:Category:Nevada culture

== D ==
- Demographics of Nevada

== E ==
- Economy of Nevada
  - Category:Economy of Nevada
    - commons:Category:Economy of Nevada
- Education in Nevada
  - Category:Education in Nevada
    - commons:Category:Education in Nevada
- Category:Elections in Nevada
  - commons:Category:Elections in Nevada
- Energy in Nevada
- Category:Environment of Nevada
  - commons:Category:Environment of Nevada

== F ==
The flag of the state of Nevada

- Festivals in Nevada
  - commons:Category:Festivals in Nevada
- Flag of the state of Nevada
- Flamingo Resort, Inc. v. United States

== G ==
- Geography of Nevada
  - Category:Geography of Nevada
    - commons:Category:Geography of Nevada
- Geology of Nevada
  - commons:Category:Geology of Nevada
- Geysers of Nevada
  - commons:Category:Geysers of Nevada
- Ghost towns in Nevada
  - Category:Ghost towns in Nevada
    - commons:Category:Ghost towns in Nevada
- Gold mining in Nevada
- Golf clubs and courses in Nevada
- Government of the State of Nevada website
  - Category:Government of Nevada
    - commons:Category:Government of Nevada
- Governor of the State of Nevada
  - List of governors of Nevada
- Great Seal of the State of Nevada

== H ==
- Heritage railroads in Nevada
  - commons:Category:Heritage railroads in Nevada
- High schools of Nevada
- Higher education in Nevada
- Highway Patrol of Nevada
- Highway routes in Nevada
- Hiking trails in Nevada
  - commons:Category:Hiking trails in Nevada
- History of Nevada
  - Historical outline of Nevada
    - Category:History of Nevada
      - commons:Category:History of Nevada
- Hospitals in Nevada
- Hot springs of Nevada
  - commons:Category:Hot springs of Nevada
- House of Representatives of the State of Nevada

== I ==
- Images of Nevada
  - commons:Category:Nevada
- Islands in Nevada

== L ==
- Lakes of Nevada
  - Lake Tahoe
  - commons:Category:Lakes of Nevada
- Landmarks in Nevada
  - commons:Category:Landmarks in Nevada
- Las Vegas, Nevada
- Lieutenant Governor of the State of Nevada
- Lists related to the State of Nevada:
  - List of airports in Nevada
  - List of census statistical areas in Nevada
  - List of cities in Nevada
  - List of colleges and universities in Nevada
  - List of United States congressional districts in Nevada
  - List of counties in Nevada
  - List of dams and reservoirs in Nevada
  - List of ghost towns in Nevada
  - List of governors of Nevada
  - List of high schools in Nevada
  - List of highway routes in Nevada
  - List of hospitals in Nevada
  - List of Indian reservations in Nevada
  - List of individuals executed in Nevada
  - List of islands in Nevada
  - List of lakes in Nevada
  - List of law enforcement agencies in Nevada
  - List of mountain ranges in Nevada
  - List of museums in Nevada
  - List of National Historic Landmarks in Nevada
  - List of newspapers in Nevada
  - List of people from Nevada
  - List of power stations in Nevada
  - List of radio stations in Nevada
  - List of railroads in Nevada
  - List of Registered Historic Places in Nevada
  - List of rivers of Nevada
  - List of school districts in Nevada
  - List of state parks in Nevada
  - List of state prisons in Nevada
  - List of symbols of the State of Nevada
  - List of television stations in Nevada
  - List of Nevada's congressional delegations
  - List of United States congressional districts in Nevada
  - List of United States representatives from Nevada
  - List of United States senators from Nevada
  - List of valleys of Nevada

== M ==
- Maps of Nevada
  - commons:Category:Maps of Nevada
- Mass media in Nevada
- Mountain ranges in Nevada
- Mountains of Nevada
  - commons:Category:Mountains of Nevada
- Museums in Nevada
  - Category:Museums in Nevada
    - commons:Category:Museums in Nevada
- Music of Nevada
  - commons:Category:Music of Nevada
  - Category:Musical groups from Nevada
  - Category:Musicians from Nevada

== N ==
- National forests of Nevada
  - commons:Category:National Forests of Nevada
- Natural arches of Nevada
  - commons:Category:Natural arches of Nevada
- Natural gas pipelines in Nevada
- Natural history of Nevada
  - commons:Category:Natural history of Nevada
- Nevada website
  - Category:Nevada
    - commons:Category:Nevada
      - commons:Category:Maps of Nevada
- Nevada Highway Patrol
- Nevada Numbers (lottery-style game played in selected casinos)
- Nevada Renewable Energy and Energy Efficiency Authority
- Nevada State Capitol
- Newspapers of Nevada
- NV – United States Postal Service postal code for the State of Nevada

== O ==
- Outdoor sculptures in Nevada
  - commons:Category:Outdoor sculptures in Nevada

== P ==
- People from Nevada
  - Category:People from Nevada
    - commons:Category:People from Nevada
    - Category:People from Nevada by populated place
    - Category:People from Nevada by county
    - Category:People from Nevada by occupation
- Politics of Nevada
  - commons:Category:Politics of Nevada
  - Prostitution in Nevada
- Protected areas of Nevada
  - commons:Category:Protected areas of Nevada

== Q ==
- Quoeech

== R ==
- Radio stations in Nevada
- Railroad museums in Nevada
  - commons:Category:Railroad museums in Nevada
- Railroads in Nevada
- Registered historic places in Nevada
  - commons:Category:Registered Historic Places in Nevada
- Religion in Nevada
  - Category:Religion in Nevada
    - commons:Category:Religion in Nevada
- Reno, Nevada
- Rivers of Nevada
  - commons:Category:Rivers of Nevada
- Rock formations in Nevada
  - commons:Category:Rock formations in Nevada
- Roller coasters in Nevada
  - commons:Category:Roller coasters in Nevada

== S ==
- School districts of Nevada
- Scouting in Nevada
- Senate of the State of Nevada
- Settlements in Nevada
  - Cities in Nevada
  - Towns in Nevada
  - Villages in Nevada
  - Census Designated Places in Nevada
  - Other unincorporated communities in Nevada
  - List of ghost towns in Nevada
- Silver mining in Nevada
- Ski areas and resorts in Nevada
  - commons:Category:Ski areas and resorts in Nevada
- Solar power in Nevada
- Southern Desert Regional Police Academy
- Sports in Nevada
  - Category:Sports in Nevada
    - commons:Category:Sports in Nevada
  - Category:Sports venues in Nevada
    - commons:Category:Sports venues in Nevada
- State Capitol of Nevada
- State of Nevada website
  - Constitution of the State of Nevada
  - Government of the State of Nevada
    - Category:Government of Nevada
      - commons:Category:Government of Nevada
  - Executive branch of the government of the State of Nevada
    - Governor of the State of Nevada
  - Legislative branch of the government of the State of Nevada
    - Legislature of the State of Nevada
      - Senate of the State of Nevada
      - House of Representatives of the State of Nevada
  - Judicial branch of the government of the State of Nevada
    - Supreme Court of the State of Nevada
- State parks of Nevada
  - commons:Category:State parks of Nevada
- State police of Nevada
- State prisons of Nevada
- Structures in Nevada
  - commons:Category:Buildings and structures in Nevada
- Supreme Court of the State of Nevada
- Symbols of the State of Nevada
  - Category:Symbols of Nevada
    - commons:Category:Symbols of Nevada

== T ==
- Telecommunications in Nevada
  - commons:Category:Communications in Nevada
- Telephone area codes in Nevada
- Television shows set in Nevada
- Television stations in Nevada
- Territory of Nevada
- Theatres in Nevada
  - commons:Category:Theatres in Nevada
- Tourism in Nevada website
  - commons:Category:Tourism in Nevada
- Transportation in Nevada
  - Category:Transportation in Nevada
    - commons:Category:Transport in Nevada
- Treaty of Guadalupe Hidalgo of 1848

== U ==
- United States of America
  - States of the United States of America
  - United States census statistical areas of Nevada
  - Nevada's congressional delegations
  - United States congressional districts in Nevada
  - United States Court of Appeals for the Ninth Circuit
  - United States District Court for the District of Nevada
  - United States representatives from Nevada
  - United States senators from Nevada
- Universities and colleges in Nevada
  - commons:Category:Universities and colleges in Nevada
- US-NV – ISO 3166-2:US region code for the State of Nevada
- USA Capital

== W ==
- Water parks in Nevada
  Wikimedia
  - Wikimedia Commons:Category:Nevada
    - commons:Category:Maps of Nevada
  - Wikinews:Category:Nevada
    - Wikinews:Portal:Nevada
  - Wikipedia Category:Nevada
    - Wikipedia Portal:Nevada
    - Wikipedia:WikiProject Nevada
      - Category:WikiProject Nevada articles
      - Category:WikiProject Nevada participants
- Wind power in Nevada

== Y ==
Yucca Mountain

== Z ==
- Zoos in Nevada
  - commons:Category:Zoos in Nevada

== See also ==
- Topic overview:
  - Nevada
  - Outline of Nevada
