= 2026 in Nevada =

- Decades: 2000s; 2010s; 2020s
- See also: History of Nevada; Historical outline of Nevada; List of years in Nevada; 2026 in the United States

== State government ==
- Governor: Joe Lombardo (R)

== Events ==
=== January ===
- January 2 – Las Vegas Metropolitan Police report over 800 traffic citations and 54 arrests over New Year's Eve in Las Vegas.
- January 20 – The Nevada Gaming Control Board files a lawsuit against Polymarket to stop it from offering unlicensed wagering, which violates Nevada law.

=== February ===
- February 17 – The state of Nevada agrees to pay $100,000 to a Winnemucca woman who was convicted of manslaughter in 2019 after suffering a miscarriage in 2018. The woman was convicted under a law that banned taking drugs to end a pregnancy after the 24th week, though her conviction was vacated in 2021.
- February 19 – A 23-year old suspect dies of a self-inflicted gunshot wound after a vehicle-ramming attack at a power substation near Interstate 11 in Boulder City. The Las Vegas Metropolitan Police and Federal Bureau of Investigation are investigating the incident as an act of terrorism.

=== March ===
- March 5 – The Eastside Cannery hotel and casino is demolished by implosion after being closed for 6 years.

=== April ===
- April 3 – The Las Vegas Review-Journal announces it will no longer print its rival, the Las Vegas Sun. The agreement had begun in 1989 with the Sun being an afternoon paper on weekdays and a section of the Review-Journal on weekends. In 2005, the agreement was amended so that the Sun was always an insert in the Review-Journal.
- April 13 – A magnitude 5.7 earthquake hits Nevada, with the epicenter being 12.9 miles east of Silver Springs. No injuries are reported.
- April 18–19 – WrestleMania 42 takes place at Allegiant Stadium in Paradise.

=== May ===
- May 13 – The Professional Women's Hockey League announces an expansion team in Las Vegas.
- May 18 – The Heart Attack Grill in Las Vegas announces it is closing after 15 years, citing "corporate greed".

=== June ===
- June 9 – Primaries for the 2026 United States elections, including the gubernatorial, lieutenant gubernatorial, attorney general, state treasurer, state auditor, state legislative, Supreme Court, and local elections, take place. Voting on ballot measures will take place in November.

=== August ===
- August 11 – The Fred Mountain Fire begins near Reno, later merging with the nearby Bug Fire. A woman is later charged with setting the Fred Mountain Fire.
- August 17 – The trial of Duane Davis begins for the murder of Tupac Shakur. Davis is accused of ordering the rapper's Las Vegas murder in 1996.
- August 31 – Duane Davis is convicted of murder.

=== Scheduled ===
- November 3 – 2026 Nevada gubernatorial election: State Attorney General Aaron Ford beats incumbent Republican Governor Joe Lombardo in the election. Various other elections also take place. Citizens in the state also vote for two ballot measures to amend the state constitution to allow the right to abortion and require residents to present a form of photo identification.
- November 4 – Former internet personality and YouTuber Bryant Moreland (known online as EDP445) is arrested in Las Vegas on multiple felony sex crime charges following self-incriminating statements made in a recent documentary by Mike Clum including a 2021 incident in Bakersfield, California.

=== Sports ===
- 2025–26 Vegas Golden Knights season
- 2026 Las Vegas Aces season
- 2026 Las Vegas Raiders season

== See also ==
- 2026 in the United States
