= 2023 in Nevada =

- Decades: 2000s; 2010s; 2020s
- See also: History of Nevada; Historical outline of Nevada; List of years in Nevada; 2023 in the United States

The following is a list of events of the year 2023 in Nevada.

== Incumbents ==
=== State government ===
- Governor: Joe Lombardo (R)

== Events ==
- March 21 – President Biden designates Avi Kwa Ame as a national monument.
- June 18 – In association football, the United States defeat Canada 2–0 in the final held at Allegiant Stadium in Paradise to win their second CONCACAF Nations League championship.
- September 3 – Burning Man 2023: Heavy flooding at the Burning Man festival kills one person and leaves tens of thousands of people stranded in the Black Rock Desert. Organizers close the festival to vehicles after the death was reported.
- December 6 – 2023 University of Nevada, Las Vegas shooting: Three people are killed and three others injured during a mass shooting at the University of Nevada, Las Vegas in Las Vegas. The perpetrator is shot dead by police.

== See also ==
- 2023 in the United States
