= 2024 in Nevada =

- Decades: 2000s; 2010s; 2020s
- See also: History of Nevada; Historical outline of Nevada; List of years in Nevada; 2024 in the United States

The following is a list of events of the year 2024 in Nevada.

== Incumbents ==
=== State government ===
- Governor: Joe Lombardo (R)

== Events ==
- February 6 – 2024 Nevada Republican presidential nominating contests:
  - Nevada holds its Republican Party presidential primary. However, the Republican Party boycotts the primary and will award no delegates to the winner. The party instead opts to hold a presidential caucus on February 8 to award its delegates.
  - 2024 Nevada Democratic presidential primary
- April 2 – Tropicana Las Vegas closes after 67 years, making way for the new ballpark for the Las Vegas Athletics.
- June 24 – A mass shooting in two apartments in North Las Vegas, killed six people, including the 47-year-old gunman, Eric Adams. 13-year-old Olivia Munoz was wounded in the shooting.
- June 25 – A gunman kills five people and critically injures a girl in North Las Vegas, then kills himself upon being confronted by the police the following day.
- June 28 –2024 NHL entry draft:
  - In ice hockey, the first day of the draft for the National Hockey League is held at the Sphere in Las Vegas, with the San Jose Sharks selecting Macklin Celebrini with the first overall pick.
- July 7 – Las Vegas, reaches 120 °F (49 °C), the city's highest temperature of all time, and surpassing the previous record of 117 °F (47 °C) set in July 2021.
- September 20 – The United States Supreme Court rules in favor of a Democratic Party bid to withhold the Green Party from the Nevada ballot for the 2024 presidential election, which was caused by the Nevada Secretary of State mistakenly directing the Green Party to use an incorrect affidavit form for ballot qualification.
- October 9 – The two towers (Paradise Tower and Club Tower) of the Tropicana Las Vegas are demolished via implosion, followed by fireworks and a drone show.
- November 5 – 2024 United States presidential election in Nevada

== See also ==
- 2024 in the United States
