= 2025 in Nevada =

- Decades: 2000s; 2010s; 2020s
- See also: History of Nevada; Historical outline of Nevada; List of years in Nevada; 2025 in the United States

The following is a list of events of the year 2025 in Nevada.

== Incumbents ==
=== State government ===
- Governor: Joe Lombardo (R)

== Events ==
- January 1 – A Tesla Cybertruck catches on fire and explodes outside Trump International Hotel Las Vegas in Paradise, Nevada, killing one person and injuring seven others.
- March 18 – A man throws Molotov cocktails and shoots at cars at a Las Vegas Tesla dealership, damaging five vehicles.
- May 16 – A man shoots several people at a Las Vegas gym, killing one and injuring three, before being killed by police.
- July 28 – A gunman kills three people and injures three others at the Grand Sierra Resort in Reno. He is shot by police and arrested but later dies from his injuries.
- August 4 – The Culinary Workers Union in Las Vegas announces they have unionized every major casino hotel on the Las Vegas Strip for the first time in the city's history after successfully making first-ever deals with The Venetian and Fontainebleu.
- August 24–September 1 – Burning Man festival
  - August 30 – A man is discovered dead in a suspected homicide at Burning Man.
- September 10 – Amazon opens its Zoox driverless robotaxi service to the public in Las Vegas.
- September 30 – A federal judge rules acting U.S. Attorney for the District of Nevada Sigal Chattah has been serving unlawfully since July.
- October 10 – The Las Vegas Aces complete a four-game sweep against the Phoenix Mercury in the 2025 WNBA playoffs, winning the fourth game 97–86. The championship is the third by the Aces in four years.
- December 29 – The Centers for Medicare and Medicaid Services awards $180 million to the Nevada Health Authority for the first five year of the federal Rural Health Transformation Program, aimed at improving healthcare in rural areas.

== See also ==
- 2025 in the United States
- 2025 Nevada wildfires
