= Area codes 702 and 725 =

Area codes for Clark County, Nevada, United States

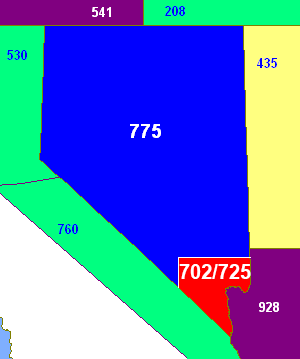
The red numbering plan area has area code 702/725; the blue area has area code 775, also in Nevada. All other area codes are in other states.

Area codes 702 and 725 are telephone area codes in the North American Numbering Plan (NANP) for Clark County, including Las Vegas, in the U.S. state of Nevada. Area code 702 was one of the original North American area codes established in October 1947, and serviced the entire state of Nevada until 1998, when it was reduced to Las Vegas and the surrounding area. In 2014, area code 725 was added to the same numbering plan area in an overlay complex to provide additional numbering resources.

== History ==
702 was the sole area code for all of Nevada until December 12, 1998. On that date, almost all of the state outside Clark County, including Reno and Carson City, was assigned area code 775. Nevada's growth in the second half of the 20th century, and the corresponding expansion of telephone service, including proliferation of cell phones and pagers, threatened the exhaustion of numbering resources in the numbering plan area, especially in Las Vegas, Reno, and Carson City.

The split followed rumors that area code 777, corresponding to the winning number combination for some slot machines, was considered for Las Vegas. However, the telecommunications industry ruled out assigning an easily recognizable area code.

Since May 3, 2014, area code 702 has been overlaid with area code 725. Ten-digit dialing is required for all calls.

Despite Las Vegas' continued growth, 702/725 is nowhere near exhaustion. Projections in 2017 suggested that the Las Vegas area would not need another area code until late 2045 at the earliest. However, in October 2019, there was no exhaust date for 702/725. In April 2021, the exhaust date is 2055.

== See also ==
- List of North American Numbering Plan area codes
- List of Nevada area codes

Nevada area codes: 702/725, 775
	North: 775	
West: 442/760, 775	702/725	East: 928
	South: 442/760	
Arizona area codes: 520, 602/480/623, 928
California area codes: 209/350, 213/323, 310/424, 408/669, 415/628, 510/341, 530, 559, 562, 619/858, 626, 650, 661, 707/369, 714/657, 760/442, 805/820, 818/747, 831, 909/840, 916/279, 925, 949, 951
