= Flag of Nevada =

U.S. state flag

Nevada
- Use: Civil and state flag
- Proportion: Not defined 2:3 (most typical); 3:5 (common iteration); 5:8 (uncommon)
- Adopted: March 26, 1929; 97 years ago (original); July 25, 1991; 35 years ago (revised)
- Design: A solid cobalt blue field. An emblem in the upper hoist consists of two sagebrush branches encircling a silver star with the text "Nevada" and "Battle Born".

The flag of the U.S. state of Nevada was adopted in 1929, when governor Fred B. Balzar signed into law a bill adopting the new flag. Its design consists of a solid cobalt blue field with, in the upper hoist quarter, two crossed sprays of sagebrush (the state flower) forming a half-wreath. Centered within the wreath is an upward-pointing silver star (a reference to the state's nickname, the Silver State), with the state's name arched below it in evenly spaced golden-yellow letters. Above the wreath is a golden-yellow scroll touching its tips, bearing the words "Battle Born", one of the state's mottos (in reference to Nevada becoming a state during the American Civil War).

== Statute ==
Nevada Revised Statutes, Chapter 235, § 235.020 defines the state flag as:

The body of the flag must be of solid cobalt blue. On the field in the upper left quarter thereof must be two sprays of Sagebrush with the stems crossed at the bottom to form a half wreath. Within the sprays must be a five-pointed silver star with one point up. The word 'Nevada' must also be inscribed below the star and above the sprays, in a semicircular pattern with the letters spaced apart in equal increments, in the same style of letters as the words 'Battle Born.' Above the wreath, and touching the tips thereof, must be a scroll bearing the words 'Battle Born.' The scroll and the word 'Nevada' must be golden-yellow. The lettering on the scroll must be black-colored sans serif gothic capital letters.

Because of how the state flag is described for construction, the emblem lacks a consistent design, and as a result, produced variations of the state flag are displayed and flown, especially in Nevada. Additionally, the colors listed do not include their appropriate Pantone and HEX value codes. Different ratios are manufactured, such as 2:3, 3:5, and 5:8, since the description lacks proportions for how a flag is made. For the text, Helvetica Bold is frequently used for both the scroll displaying "BATTLE BORN" and the upward curve below the star reading "NEVADA"; however the statue doesn't specify a font for both, and as a result the scroll may use something like Impact, while "NEVADA" keeps Helvetica, or instead of the latter all together, Impact is used for both "BATTLE BORN" and "NEVADA".

A variant design of the flag's emblem. Note the asymmetrical sagebrush crest, and the two fonts.

A common variant of the state flag.

This flag's layout is uncommon, as the blue field matches that of the U.S. flag's Canton, and the scroll utilizes yellow while the sagebrush flowers use orange.

Even though this flag uses the "correct colors", the emblem's layout isn't considered the official product.

== History ==
In 1877, there was a bill on the house floor to come up with a state flag. It never went anywhere.

=== First flag (1905) ===
The first Nevada state flag from 1905 to 1915

The first flag of Nevada was created by Governor John Sparks and Colonel Harry Day in 1905. It was based strongly on Nevada's natural resources of gold and silver. The blue of the flag was to be the same as the blue on the flag of the United States.

=== Second flag (1915) ===
The second Nevada state flag from 1915 to 1929

The second flag of Nevada was designed by Clara Crisler in 1915. The flag sought to be more representative of Nevada by adding the state seal as the center point of the flag. The flag retained the same blue field as the previous flag. The 36 stars on the flag represented how Nevada was the 36th state in the union.

The flag proved popular, but the abundance of colors on the seal was too expensive to produce which led to the adoption of a new flag in 1929.

=== Current flag (1929) ===
The Nevada state flag as it appeared from 1929 to 1991

The current flag had its origin in a design contest announced in 1926. The winning design, by Louis Shellback III, was subjected to some revision in the state legislature, where there was disagreement between the two houses over the placement of the word "Nevada" on the flag. A compromise was reached, and in 1929 Governor Fred B. Balzar signed into law a bill adopting the new flag.

In 1989, however, a legislative researcher discovered that the bill as sent to and signed by the governor did not accurately reflect the 1929 legislative agreement. The flag used from 1929 until it was revised in 1991 displayed the letters of the word "Nevada" in a complete circle around the flag's single star, with the "N" of Nevada at the uppermost tip of the star indicating its "northern" position in the civil war, and with each of the other letters of the word Nevada located in the spaces between the remaining points of the star, displaying near each junction of the star's pentagonal center. Thus, "Nevada" was spelt from the "N" at the top, radiating clockwise E, V, A, D, A, in the spaces between the star's points.

A law enacted in 1991 directed that the word "Nevada" appear below the star and above the sagebrush sprays, thus producing the current design.

== Other flags ==
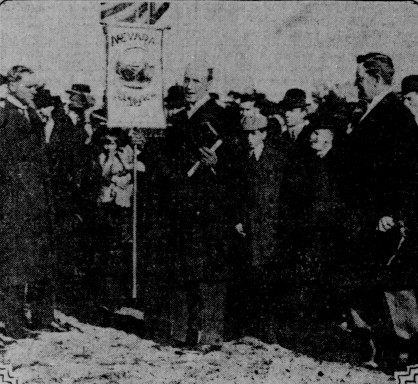
State banner made for the Panama–Pacific International Exposition, 1912-1915

According to The San Francisco Call there was a state flag made in 1912 for the Panama–Pacific International Exposition. It was given to Governor Tasker Oddie by the Charles C Moore, president of the exposition. The banner was white with the word "NEVADA" on top and the state seal in the center with the date of the exposition below.

== Proposed flags ==
Proposed flag of 1953 that was vetoed.

John Karp's proposed flag for Nevada from 2001, which won flag redesign contests in both the Utne Reader and the Nevada Magazine.

== Gallery ==
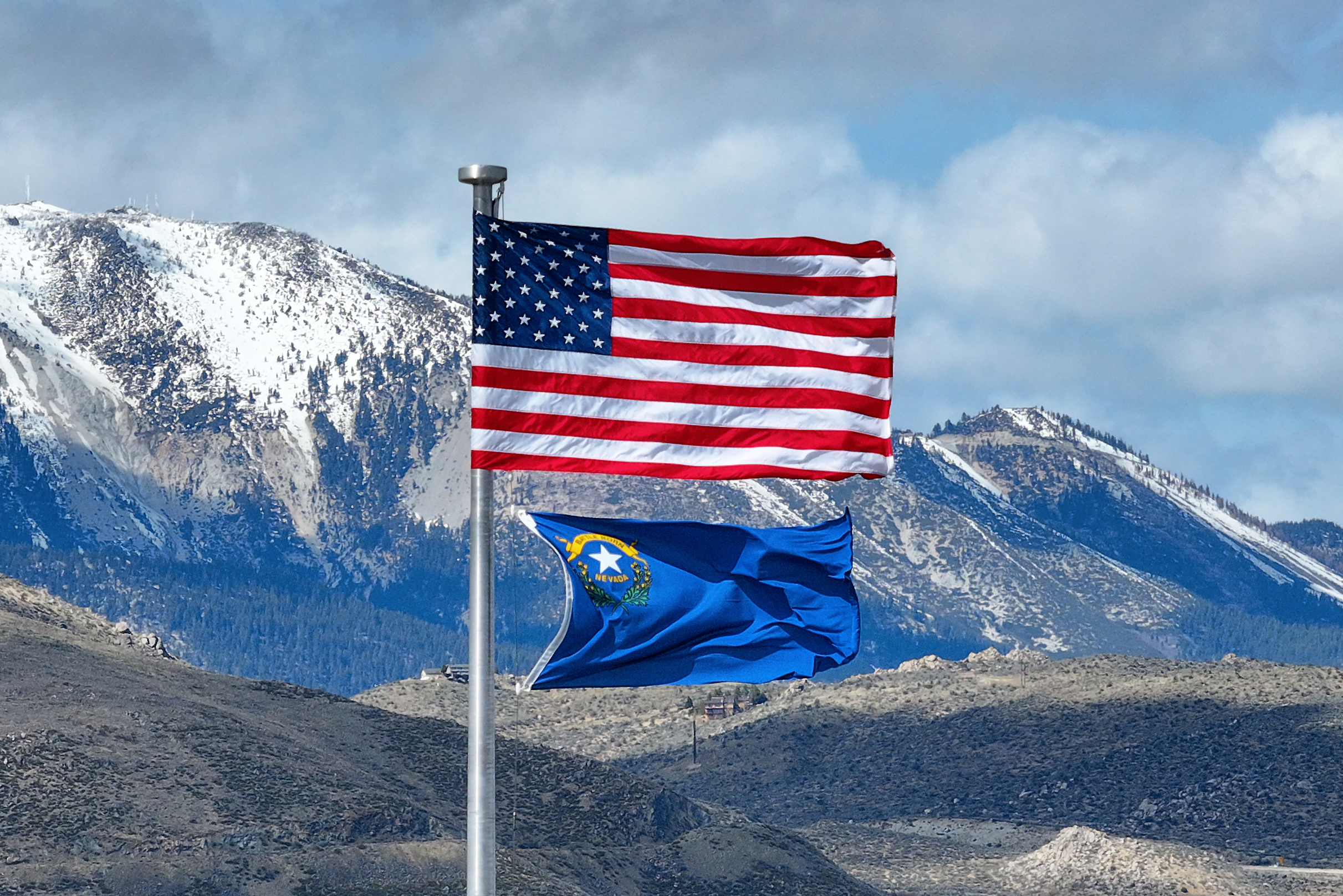
The state flag flying in Carson City, underneath a U.S. flag.

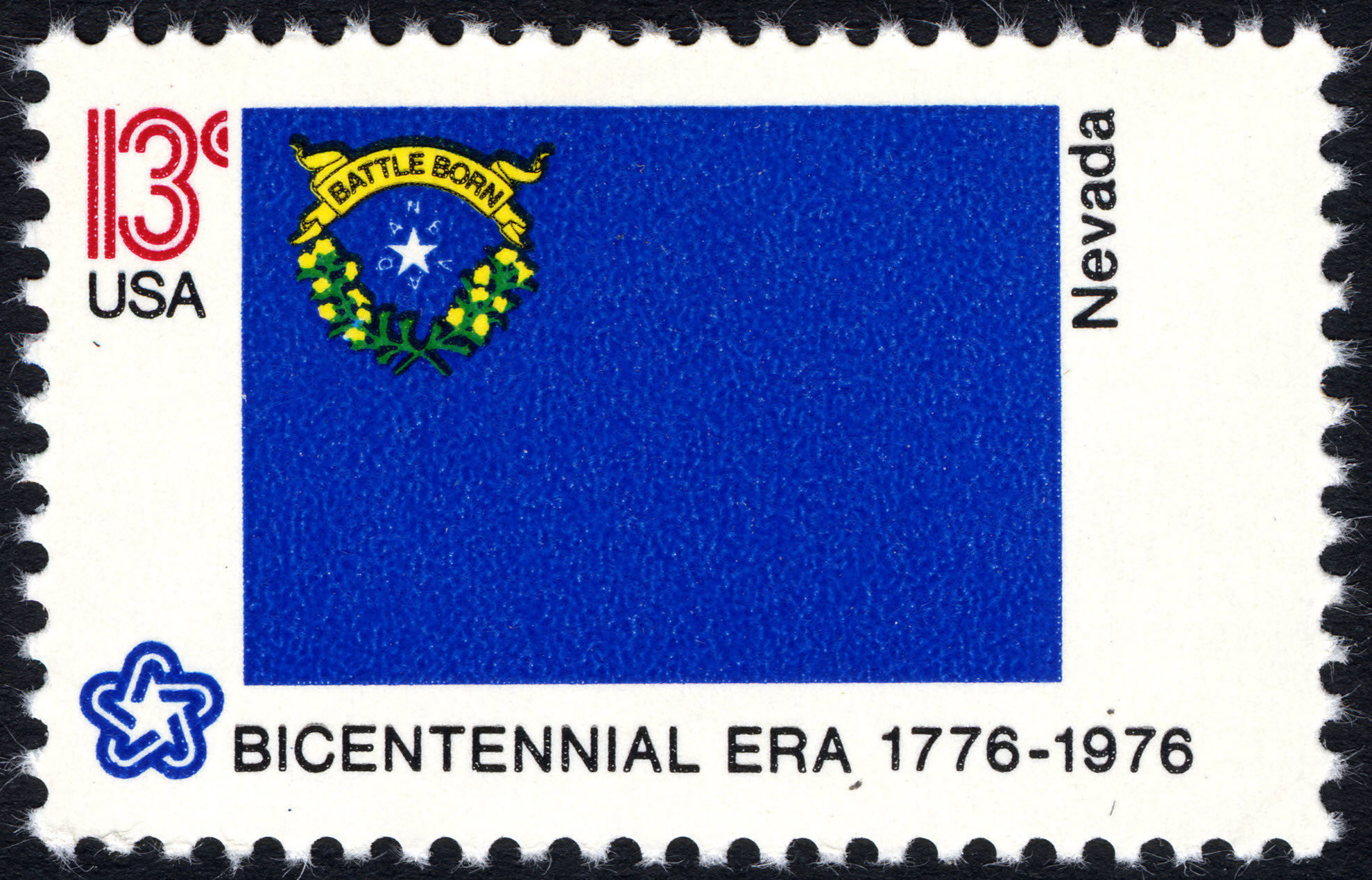
The state flag as depicted in the 1976 bicentennial postage stamp series.

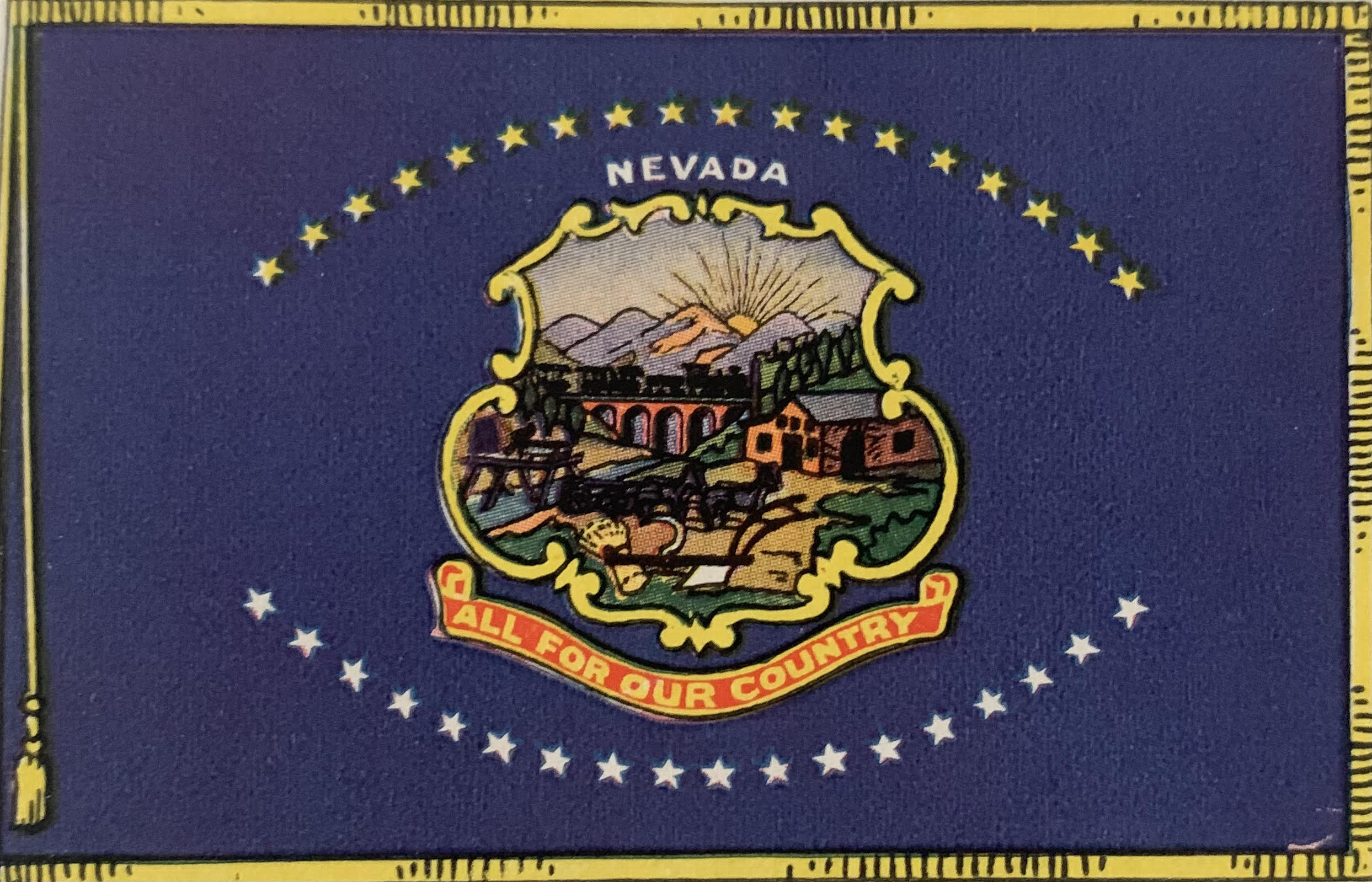
Depiction of the state flag from 1917.

== See also ==
- State of Nevada
- List of Nevada state symbols
- Seal of Nevada
