= List of Nevada area codes =

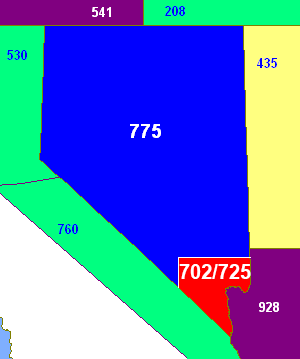

In 1947, the American Telephone and Telegraph Company designated the entire state of Nevada as a single numbering plan area (NPA) with area code 702. The state was divided into two distinct geographic NPAs in 1998.

Area code	Year created	Parent NPA	Overlay	Numbering plan area
702	1947	–	702/725	southern tip of Nevada, including the Las Vegas metropolitan area
725	2014	702	702/725	southern tip of Nevada, including the Las Vegas metropolitan area
775	1998	702	–	Nevada other than the southern tip, including Reno and Carson City

== See also ==
- List of North American Numbering Plan area codes
