= September 2023 southwestern U.S. floods =

Flood event in 2023

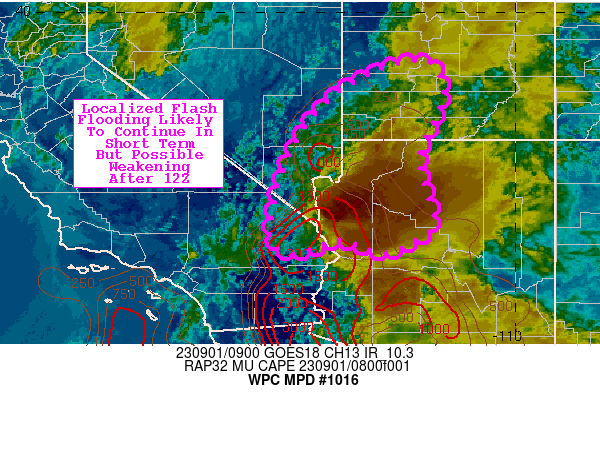
- A mesoscale precipitation discussion issued by the Weather Prediction Center concerning flash flooding across the southwestern United States on September 1, 2023
- Cause: Heavy rains

Meteorological history
- Duration: September 1 — September 3, 2023

Flood
- Max. rainfall: >4 inches (100 mm) east of Palo Verde, California

Overall effects
- Fatalities: 1
- Damage: $550 million (2023 USD)
- Areas affected: Southeastern California, southern Nevada, northwestern Arizona, southwestern Utah

In a period of three days on September 1–3, 2023, flooding occurred as part of a seasonal monsoon season across portions of the Southwestern United States, including California, Nevada, Arizona, Utah and the Las Vegas Valley. Muddy terrain during the Burning Man festival stranded more than 70,000 people.

== Meteorological synopsis ==
Across the Desert Southwest, training showers and thunderstorms developed as they headed northward by an almost-undirectional flow, which was situated between a low-pressure area across California, and a retreating ridge of high pressure to the east of the low. Southerly flow between the low and the high pressure ridge caused moisture to be driven northward, surface-based convective available potential energy values of 1000–2000 j/kg yielded conditions for heavy rainfall-producing convective systems, and weak shortwaves combined with shear between 25–35 knots (29–40 mph; 46–65 km/h; 13–18 m/s) also provided thunderstorm development. On September 1, the Weather Prediction Center also stated in a mesoscale precipitation discussion that repeated rounds of thunderstorms were possible across the southwestern United States.

== Impact ==
=== Nevada ===
Interstate 15 near the California—Nevada border and south of Jean was shut down due to flooding. At least 24 water rescues occurred and more than 30 vehicles submerged in floodwaters as crews from Las Vegas Fire & Rescue assisted with search and rescue efforts. One death, possibly due to drowning from floodwaters, occurred near Las Vegas in West Valley, Nevada. A downpour also temporarily delayed a UNLV—Bryant college football game at Allegiant Stadium. Portions of the Las Vegas Strip flooded, including a channel outside of The Linq as the city of Las Vegas was under a flash flood warning. The Nevada Department of Transportation closed travel lanes on Nevada State Route 447. Debris closed all but one lane on U.S. Route 93 northbound. The National Weather Service office in Las Vegas recorded 0.88 inches (22 mm) of rainfall, which was the wettest day in September in 11 years.

More than 4,000 power outages occurred, and 108 flights were cancelled, along with 673 delayed flights at Harry Reid International Airport. A ground stop was also briefly issued for the airport.

==== Burning Man ====
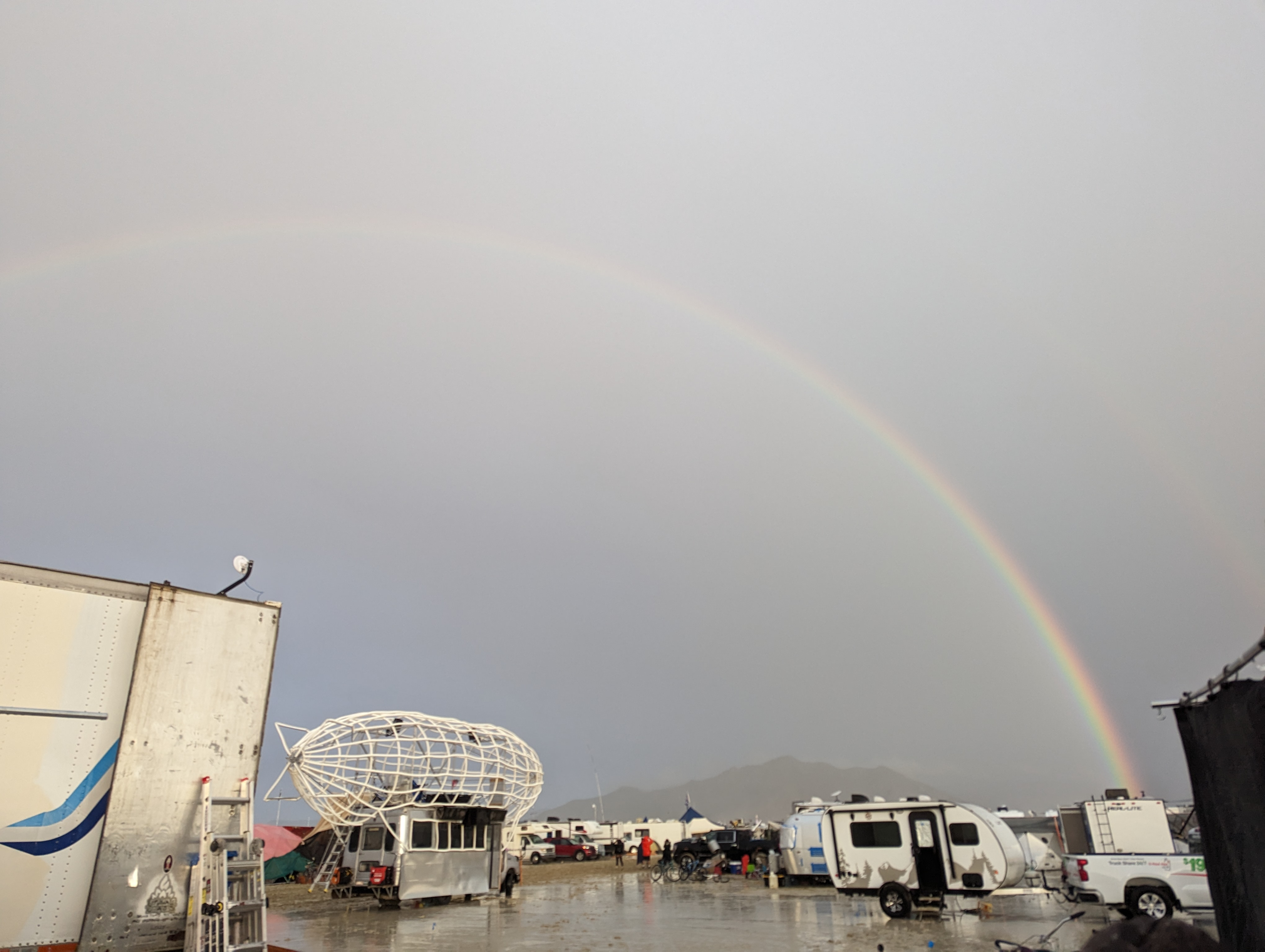
Rainfall and a rainbow at Burning Man

Torrential rainfall flooded the Burning Man festival, which was closed throughout the remainder of the scheduled event afterwards as thunderstorms also flooded the Black Rock Desert. Diplo and Chris Rock, who attended the festival, fled 5–6 miles (8.0–9.7 km) from the festival site through mud caused by the floods. Mud across roads near the festival closed vehicle traffic stranding at least 73,000 people after the festival ended. According to Pershing County sheriff Jerry Allen, some vehicles have caused damage to the playa. Allen urged attendees to avoid driving out of the festival. The burning of the Man was delayed and one person died. Former acting solicitor general Neal Katyal took a six-mile (10 km) hike, describing the journey as "harrowing".

=== California ===
More than 12 water rescues occurred in Imperial County, as several roads in that county were also closed due to debris and flooding. Portions of California State Route 78 in Imperial Valley were closed, and the California Highway Patrol, United States Coast Guard's San Diego sector, and the Imperial County Fire Department assisted with flood rescue operations. More than 4 inches (100 mm) fell across portions of Imperial County and east of Palo Verde. Road closures also occurred in Coachella Valley, and the Riverside County Emergency Management Department coordinated with numerous emergency management departments to address damage and concerns. Several businesses and homes, along with agricultural fields, were flooded in Niland, as more than 4 inches (100 mm) of rain fell east of the area.

=== Arizona ===
Several streets were flooded in a Yuma neighborhood as the city received up to 4 inches (100 mm) in two hours. Yuma, Mohave, Pima, and La Paz counties were under a flash flood warning, and a funnel cloud was reported near San Luis. Cities in western Arizona, including Kingman, Bullhead City, and Fort Mohave were also under flash flood warnings. High wind gusts caused blowing dust across portions of the state, which led to a delay in an Arizona State Sun Devils football game. There were also wind gusts of up to 71 miles per hour (114 km/h) at Phoenix Sky Harbor International Airport, where several flights there were diverted, and more than 27,000 power outages occurred in Maricopa County. A rainfall record was set in Yuma on September 2, breaking the previous record of 1.67 inches (42 mm).

=== Elsewhere ===
Mudslides forced closures on portions of U.S. Route 6 and U.S. Route 191 in Carbon County. Severe thunderstorm warnings were issued for portions of western Utah. Heavy rainfall caused mud and rockslides at Bryce Canyon National Park, and forced the closure of Navajo Loop Trail. Severe thunderstorm warnings and flood advisories were also issued for Eastern Idaho.
