= List of Indian reservations in Nevada =

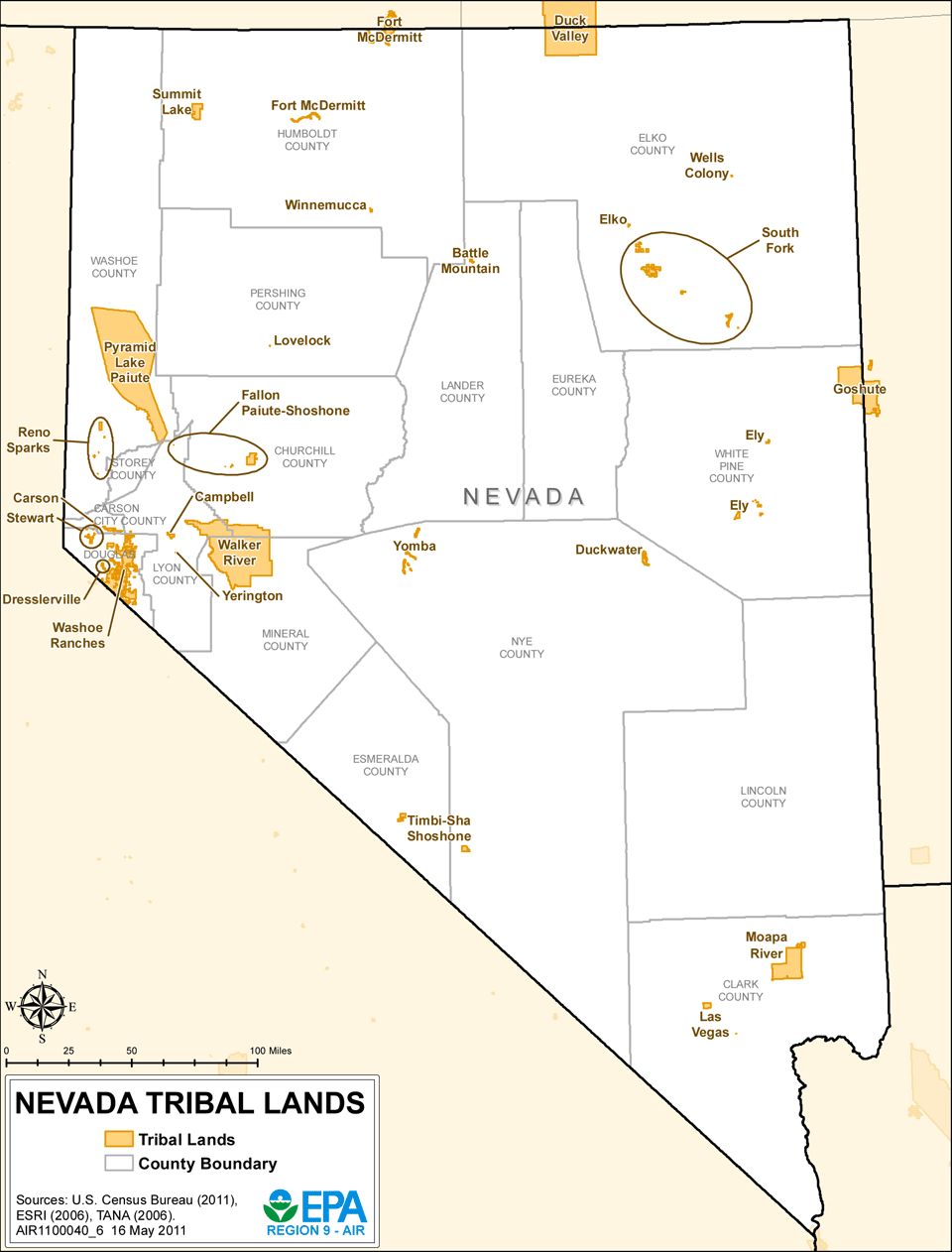
Tribal land

This is a list of Indian reservations and Indian colonies in the U.S. state of Nevada.

== List of Reservations and Colonies ==
Official name	Ethnicity	Pop.	Area (Acres)	County(s)	Notes
Duck Valley Indian Reservation	Northern Paiute, Western Shoshone	1,265	288,000	Elko	Reservation extends into Owyhee County, Idaho.
Duckwater Reservation	Western Shoshone	288	3,815	Nye	
Ely Shoshone Indian Reservation	Western Shoshone	133	104.99	White Pine	
Fallon Paiute-Shoshone Reservation	Northern Paiute, Western Shoshone	620	5,540	Churchill	
Fort McDermitt Indian Reservation	Northern Paiute, Western Shoshone	689	16,354	Humboldt	Reservation extends into Malheur County, Oregon.
Fort Mojave Indian Reservation	Mohave	--	5,582	Clark	Reservation extends into San Bernardino County, California and Mohave County, Arizona.
Goshute Reservation	Goshute	539	122,085	White Pine	Reservation extends into Juab and Tooele Counties in Utah.
Las Vegas Indian Colony	Southern Paiute	71	3,850	Clark	
Lovelock Indian Colony	Northern Paiute	110	20	Pershing	
Moapa River Indian Reservation	Southern Paiute	206	71,954	Clark	
Pyramid Lake Indian Reservation	Northern Paiute	1,603	475,008	Lyon, Storey, Washoe	
Reno-Sparks Indian Colony	Washoe, Paiute and Shoshone	1,100	1,948	Washoe	
Summit Lake Indian Reservation	Northern Paiute	112	12,573	Humboldt	
Te-Moak Tribe	Western Shoshone	2,096	20,005.1	Elko, Lander	Includes Battle Mountain Colony, Elkon Colony, South Fork Colony and Wells Colony.
Walker River Indian Reservation	Northern Paiute	853	529.97	Churchill, Lyon, Mineral	
Washoe Tribe	Washoe	1,116	64,300	Douglas	Includes Carson Colony, Dresslerville Colony, Stewart Community and Washoe Ranch. The tribe also maintains a colony in Alpine County, California.
Winnemucca Indian Colony	Northern Paiute, Western Shoshone	17	320	Humboldt	
Yerington Reservation and Trust Lands	Northern Paiute	659	1,653	Lyon	Includes Campbell Ranch and Yerington Colony.
Yomba Reservation	Western Shoshone	192	4,718.46	Nye	

== See also ==
- Indigenous peoples of the Great Basin
- List of federally recognized tribes in Nevada
- List of Indian reservations in the United States
