= List of colleges and universities in Nevada =

This is a list of colleges and universities in the U.S. state of Nevada. The higher education system of Nevada is composed primarily of public two and four-year institutions, private four-year institutions and two and four-year for-profit schools. The largest college in the state is the University of Nevada, Las Vegas with nearly 33,000 students.

The eight public institutions are under the control of the Nevada System of Higher Education (NSHE) (formerly the University and Community College System of Nevada "UCCSN") and are divided into comprehensive colleges and community colleges. An unusual characteristic of the community colleges is that they award bachelor's degrees in recognition of the limited resources of the state.

The oldest college in the state is the University of Nevada, Reno was founded in 1874 in Elko, Nevada as a political compromise and later became a Morrill Act Land Grant institution. Following a period of inactivity, the college was re-founded in Reno in 1886. In 1951, an extension campus was created in Las Vegas. In 1957, the extension became the University of Nevada, Las Vegas. In 1971, the College of Southern Nevada was founded to serve the growing population of Nevada. The most recent public college is Nevada State University in Henderson, which was founded in 2002.

The private colleges of Nevada are divided into non-profit and for-profit institutions, with several branches of national for-profit institutions such as Chamberlain University.

== Public colleges and universities ==
Name	Location	Type	Founded	Enrollment (fall 2024)	Notes
College of Southern Nevada	Las Vegas	Four and Two year	1971	28,313	Founded as Clark County Community College, later renamed the Community College of Southern Nevada.
Great Basin College	Elko	Four year	1967	3,320	Founded as Elko College, it was later renamed Northern Nevada College.
Nevada State University	Henderson	Four year	2002	7,549	
Truckee Meadows Community College	Reno	Two year	1971	10,885	Split from Western Nevada College in 1979.
University of Nevada, Las Vegas	Paradise	Four year	1957	32,911	
University of Nevada, Reno	Reno	Four year	1874	23,024	Includes Desert Research Institute branch campus
Western Nevada College	Carson City	Two year	1971	4,284	Formerly known as Western Nevada Community College.

== Private, nonprofit colleges and universities ==
Name	Location	Type	Founded	Enrollment (fall 2024)	Notes
Roseman University of Health Sciences	Henderson	Four year	2001	1,367	Formerly known as Nevada College of Pharmacy, later changed to University of Southern Nevada. Most recent name change occurred in 2011 to reflect the university's large presence in Utah.
Touro University Nevada	Henderson	Graduate	2004	1,600	Sister colleges are located in California and New York.
Wongu University of Oriental Medicine	Las Vegas	Four year and Graduate	2012	29	A Las Vegas Oriental Medical University and Acupuncture School approved by the Nevada State Board of Oriental Medicine.

== For-profit colleges and universities ==
Name	Location	Type	Founded	Enrollment (fall 2024)
Arizona College of Nursing	Las Vegas	Four year	1991	1,222
Carrington College	Las Vegas & Reno	Two year	1967	947
Chamberlain University	Las Vegas	Four year	1889	414
Galen College of Nursing	Las Vegas	Four year	1989	293
Las Vegas College	Las Vegas	Four year	1979	536
Nevada Career Institute	Las Vegas	Two year	1993	461
Northwest Career College	Las Vegas	Two year	1997	2,937
Pima Medical Institute	Las Vegas	Two year	2003	678

== See also ==
- Higher education in the United States
- List of college athletic programs in Nevada
- List of American institutions of higher education
- List of colleges and universities
- List of colleges and universities by country
- List of recognized higher education accreditation organizations
- Nevada System of Higher Education
