= Seal of Nevada =

Official government emblem of the U.S. state of Nevada

Seal of the State of Nevada
- Armiger: State of Nevada
- Adopted: 1862
- Motto: All for Our Country
- Earlier version: Volans et Potens

The Great Seal of the State of Nevada is the seal of the U.S. state of Nevada. The insignia is derived from the seal of the Nevada Territory, first described in legislation enacted by the territorial legislature in 1861. The territorial design featured a quartz mill, a miner with a U.S. flag, and the Latin motto Volens et Potens ("Willing and Able"), which was intended to symbolize Nevada's commitment to the Union and its natural wealth. It was officially adopted as the state's seal in its current form by statute in 1866 during the second session of the Nevada Legislature.

== History ==
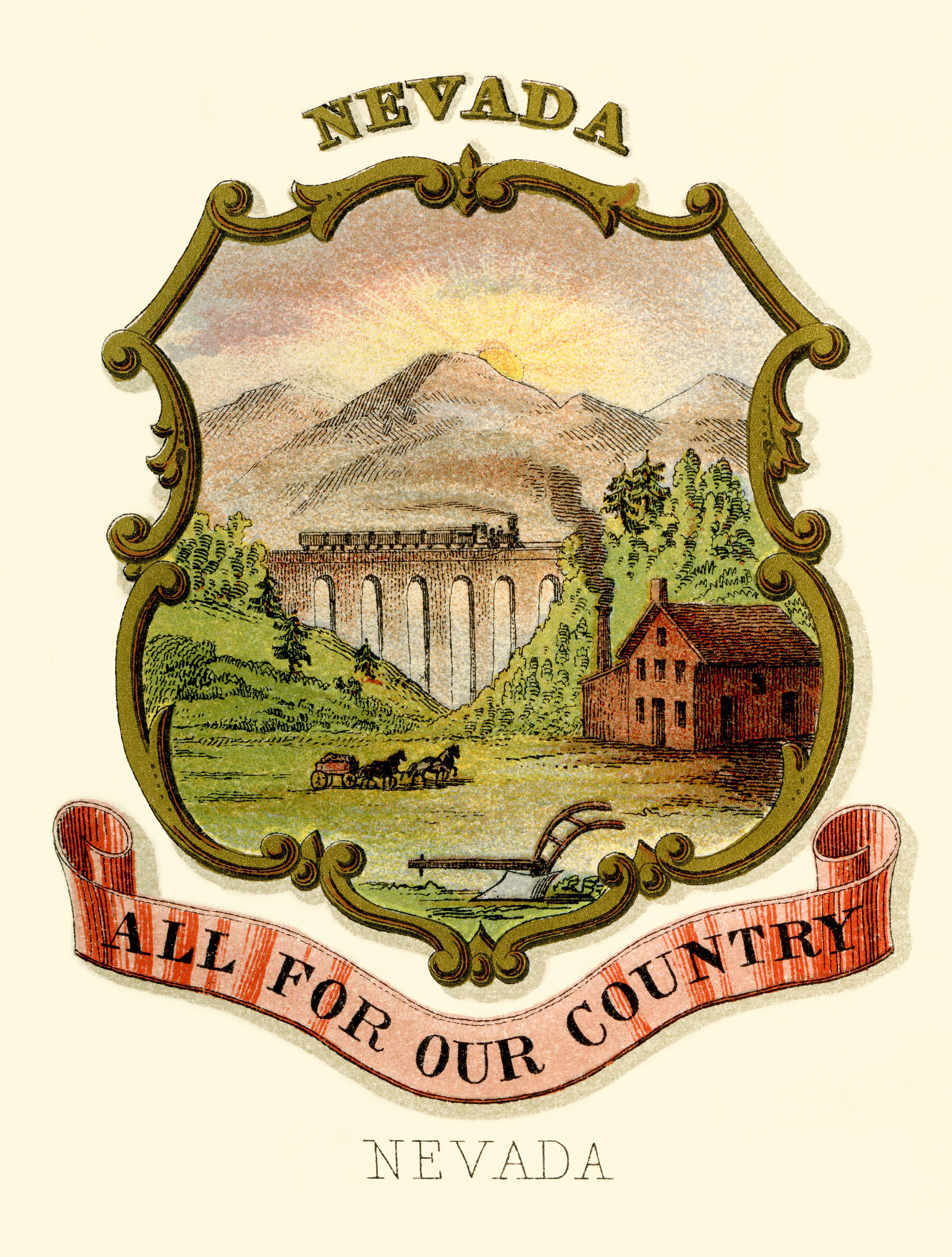
Historical coat of arms (1876)

The first official seal for Nevada was described in an act of the Nevada Territorial Legislature in 1861. In that description, the central imagery consisted of two mountains with a stream powering an overshot wheel of a quartz mill, a miner leaning on his pick and holding a United States flag, and the motto Volens et Potens. The territorial legislature authorized the secretary of the territory to supervise the design and cutting of this seal, but no explicit instructions were given regarding custody.

During territory's constitutional conventions of 1863 and 1864, delegates adopted a new design for the seal. Although the convention resolution directed the secretary of the territory to procure a state seal after popular ratification, that action was omitted from the final constitution and had no binding legal effect. The official statutory establishment happened when the second session of the Nevada Legislature adopted the seal description on February 24, 1866. At that time, the Latin motto was replaced by All for Our Country reflecting the state's newly formalized emblem.

In 1875, the Legislature clarified practical issues of custody by specifying that, although the constitution named the governor as custodian, the secretary of state would have access to and use of the seal to verify official acts. No constitutional amendment has ever been passed to transfer ultimate custody, so the statute remains in force.

== Design ==
State law describes the design in NRS 235. 010 as having mining and agricultural scenes with mountains, a quartz mill, tunnel, plow, and other symbols. It also describes a railroad train, telegraph lines, snow-capped peaks, and a rising sun, all surrounded by 36 stars, the state motto "All for Our Country, " and the seal's title.

In the foreground, there must be two large mountains, at the base of which, on the right, there must be located a quartz mill, and on the left a tunnel, penetrating the silver leads of the mountain, with a miner running out a carload of ore, and a team loaded with ore for the mill. Immediately in the foreground, there must be emblems indicative of the agricultural resources of the State, as follows: A plow, a sheaf and sickle. In the middle ground, there must be a railroad train passing a mountain gorge and a telegraph line extending along the line of the railroad. In the extreme background, there must be a range of snow-clad mountains, with the rising sun in the east. Thirty-six stars and the motto of our state, “All for Our Country, ” must encircle the whole group. In an outer circle, the words “The Great Seal of the State of Nevada” must be engraved with “Nevada” at the base of the Seal and separated from the other words by two groups of three stars each.

— Nevada Revised Statutes 235. 010: "Contents and design of Seal; authorized use; official colors; exceptions; penalty."

== Mark Twain myth ==
A longstanding myth says that Mark Twain was responsible for the original state seal having a mistake—the smoke from the mill and the train are shown blowing in opposite directions and that. Guy Rocha, the former archivist of the state of Nevada explains that the myth began with Gary BeDunnah, an elementary school teacher in the Clark County School District. BeDunnah wrote a fourth-grade social studies textbook, Discovering Nevada, in 1994 which includes the myth. However, a 2006 edition of the book excludes it.

There is no documentary evidence that Mark Twain, whose older brother Orion was the first secretary of state of Nevada, participated in a hoax concerning the seal. Nor did Alanson W. Nightingill or John Church collaborate with Twain—the former was not a delegate to the 1864 convention, and Twain had already departed Nevada by May 1864. Between 1917 and the present, all state-printed reproductions show the smoke from both mill and locomotive blowing leftward, but this standardization did not occur until Joe Farnsworth became state printer in 1917. The myth of a deliberate prank therefore lacks factual support.

== Custody and usage ==
Although Article V, Section 15 of the Nevada constitution designates the governor as keeper of the seal, the secretary of state has de facto custody and affixes the seal to certified documents. The 1875 statute specifically granted the secretary of state access to the seal to verify official acts, resolving practical inconsistencies between constitutional language and functional responsibilities. Minor variations occasionally appear among departmental reproductions—such as the number of train cars or apparent prominence of snow on mountains—but the embossed seal impressed by the secretary of state remains the most faithful to the 1866 statutory description.

== See also ==
- Symbols of the state of Nevada
- Flag of Nevada
