= Southern Desert Regional Police Academy =

The Southern Desert Regional Police Academy (SDRPA) is a regional / combination academy staffed and attended by over 15 different law enforcement agencies in the state of Nevada. The SDRPA is housed at a College of Southern Nevada's remote campus in Henderson.

The academy trains many agencies including, but not limited to the Community College of Southern Nevada Police Department, City of Las Vegas - Department of Public Safety, North Las Vegas Police Department, Clark County School District Police Department, UNLV Police Services, area fire marshals and arson investigators. The academy also has a non-affiliate program where non sworn members can attend the academy, paying their own way, and possibly speed up the ability to get hired by one of the areas agencies. All graduates of the SDRPA receive over 30 college credits for successful completion.
