= Nevada Numbers =

Former statewide keno game

The logo of the Nevada Numbers Lite game; the original version omitted the word "Lite".

Nevada Numbers was a statewide lottery-style progressive keno game with a minimum jackpot of $5 million. Nevada Numbers was proprietary to Las Vegas Gaming Inc. Tickets were available for purchase at participating keno lounges in casinos across the state. Players chose five numbers out of 80. Plays cost $2 each.

The game was originally field tested in 2001 at three casinos: Bally's, Paris, and the Las Vegas Hilton.

The progressive jackpot was annuitized; however, winners could choose to have the jackpot paid in cash.

The original Nevada Numbers was discontinued on March 31, 2009.

The largest Nevada Numbers prize was paid out at Sam's Town Casino in Las Vegas. The player hit all five numbers in September 2007, winning $6,376,452.

== Nevada Numbers Lite ==
A revived version of the game, Nevada Numbers Lite, began in September 2011 at three casinos; two in Las Vegas, and one in Laughlin. Nevada Numbers Lite, which was played more similarly to keno than Nevada Numbers, has players choosing 9 numbers out of 80, while 20 are drawn. Plays are $1. Draws are approximately every 10 minutes.
