= Flamingo Resort, Inc. v. United States =

- Court: United States Court of Appeals for the Ninth Circuit
- Full case name: Flamingo Resort, Inc. v. United States of America
- Argued: October 5, 1981
- Decided: January 7, 1982
- Citations: 664 F.2d 1387; 82-1 USTC (CCH) ¶ 9136

Court membership
- Judges sitting: Joseph Tyree Sneed III, Thomas Tang, Harry Pregerson

Case opinions
- Majority: Sneed, joined by Tang, Pregerson

Laws applied
- Internal Revenue Code

Flamingo Resort, Inc. v. United States, 664 F.2d 1387 (9th Cir. 1982), was a case decided before the United States Court of Appeals for the Ninth Circuit that decided the question of when the right to receive income represented by "markers", or gambling credit lines, become "fixed" for tax purposes based on the "all events" test.

== Facts ==
The Flamingo Resort, a Las Vegas casino, routinely extended lines of credit to some of its customers in order to help facilitate gambling in the casino. Customers would sign "markers" which represented their liability for the amount loaned. The Flamingo Resort successfully collected on those receivables at rates as high as 96%. On its 1967 tax return, the casino, an accrual basis taxpayer, excluded $676,432.00 of receivables attributable to uncollected loans from "markers" issued. The Commissioner of the Internal Revenue Service required the accrual of this income.

== Issue ==
The issue in this case was whether the right to receive income from the "markers" was "fixed" for accrual purposes when the "markers" were first extended or if the right was not "fixed" until the casino collected on the loans.

== Holding ==
The Court of Appeals affirmed the holding of the lower court, holding that the right to receive income was sufficiently "fixed" when the credit was extended and therefore required the casino to include the $676,432.00 in dispute on their 1967 tax return.

== Reasoning ==
The Court began by defining the test which governs the timing for reporting income of accrual basis taxpayers, which is the "all events" test. The "all events" test requires, in relevant part, that income be included in gross income "when all the events have occurred which fix the right to receive such income." The casino argued that the right to receive income from the "markers" was not "fixed" because Nevada does not recognize a legal obligation for customers to pay gambling debts of this sort. The Court explicitly rejected the casino's reliance on H. Liebes & Co. v. Commissioner, holding that this case did not require that there must be a legal liability to pay the debt, only that the obligation be "fixed" and there be a "reasonable expectancy" that the obligation would be collected.

The Court found that the casino had a "reasonable expectancy" that the "marker" obligations would be converted into cash since the casino itself estimated it collected at a rate as high as 96% on the "markers" issued. The lack of a legally enforceable right against the customers was not controlling and such a right is not necessary in order for the right to the income to be fixed. Therefore, the court held that the casino's right to the income was "fixed" for accrual purposes and that the "markers" must be accrued when issued.

== Importance ==
The Internal Revenue Service followed the holding of this case with Revenue Ruling 83-106 which held that an accrual method casino is required to include in income all gambling revenue originating from extensions of credit in the year in which the gambling obligations arise. This is important because it makes clear that a right to income can be fixed for purposes of the "all events" test of accrual method taxpayers without there being a legally enforceable right to the income. It is sufficient for there to be a reasonable expectation of collecting on the obligation. This prevents casinos from being able to defer income into later taxable years simply by running much of their play on credit lines.
