= USA Capital =

American investment management company

- Type: Private
- Industry: Financial services
- Founded: 1997
- Defunct: 2006
- Fate: Bankrupt
- Headquarters: Las Vegas, Nevada, United States
- Key people: Tom Hantges; Joseph Milanowski
- Products: Hard money loans, mortgage brokerage
- Total assets: US$962 million (at time of bankruptcy)

USA Capital, also known as USA Commercial Mortgage Company, was a Las Vegas–based mortgage lender that filed for bankruptcy in April 2006 while managing approximately $962 million in investor funds from more than 6,000 investors.

== Operations ==
'USA Capital', the hard money lender USA Commercial Mortgage Co.(USACM), was a Las Vegas, Nevada based mortgage broker owned by Tom Hantges and Joe Milanowski. Affiliated with the lending/brokerage activity at USACM was a management company, USA Securities, and two funds, the First Trust Deed Fund and for Nevada residents only, the Diversified Trust Deed Fund.

There were two general categories of investors;

- fund investors who pooled their cash with others and allowed USACM to select which investments would be made and
- direct lenders who desired to evaluate projects for themselves before investing in an individual loan.

Though there were instances of a single direct lender funding an entire loan, the vast majority of loans were funded by many entities, which included the two Trust Deed Funds themselves. Typically loans ranging from up to $3,000,000 to $30,000,000 would be funded by between 30 and 300 persons, each of whom was a fractional beneficiary of the promissory note.

The loans brokered by USACM offered investors high interest rates relative to the prevailing safe rates available on CDs and Treasury Notes. Publicly at least, USACM maintained a nearly unblemished record of stability and integrity for years and advertised that "no investor has ever lost a penny of principal."

When borrowers approached USACM in need of money, USACM would negotiate hard terms. This included hefty upfront origination fees and loan points, ongoing servicing and extension fees, and back end equity participation or success fees all of which were payable to USACM. The retail investors received interest only.

Very often loans were made on land or projects that were very early in their development, entitlement or marketing stages. In most cases, these properties did not generate rental income so sales of units, or the refinance or sale of further entitled land was required to pay the investors back. Impound accounts sufficient to pay interest for the term of the loans were generally funded with the investor's own money and as a result repayment of most loans was almost entirely dependent on continuing high demand for condominium conversions and stable or accelerating demand for builder ready land.

== Bankruptcy ==
In 2005 with impound funds depleting and the reduced ability of borrowers to sell condos to the public or sell land to builders, borrowers began to default on their obligations. USACM hid this fact from both the Nevada regulators and the investors. In a bid to stay solvent USACM not only continued to collect fees by originating speculative loans into a weakening real estate market but told investors that loans had been extended when in fact the loans had paid off. The proceeds of the payoffs, instead of being paid to the rightful beneficiaries, were diverted to pay thousands of other investors their monthly interest checks. As such every loan in the portfolio appeared to be performing.

On April 13, 2006 the company declared bankruptcy. At the time of insolvency the company had 6,500 investors and was managing $962,000,000 in investor assets, making it the biggest bankruptcy case in the history of Nevada.

== Court cases ==
Marc Levinson, an attorney representing investors in USA Capital likened the operation to a Ponzi scheme. The bankruptcy court judge Linda Riegle ordered the appointment of a trustee to oversee matters when it was disclosed that Hantges and Milanowski owed $9.8 million to a reputed former associate of Gambino crime family boss John Gotti.

In November 2006 some investors organized themselves as the USA Capital Lender Protection Group. By March 2007 membership had grown to over 750.

On March 15, 2007 New York City private equity firm Compass Partners announced they were the highest bidder at a bankruptcy court auction. The company paid $47 million for the right to service most of the outstanding loans, and for the assets of the USA Capital First Trust Deed Fund. Many investors were opposed to the involvement of Compass.

The same month, investors received letters from the FBI informing them that they were possible victims of a crime and that USACM was under investigation. According to an investment prospectus distributed to the Diversified Fund investors all invested funds would be secured by real estate. This was not the case as at least one sizeable unsecured loan was made to an entity owned and controlled by one or more of the principals at USACM. As a result, Joseph Milanowski accepted a plea bargain and was sentenced to 12 years in prison on one count of wire fraud.

USA Capital's management was also found to be directly involved with several of the developers that were being funded, a conflict of interest and the Nevada Mortgage Lending Division later issued an opinion stating that the profit participations USACM negotiated on its own behalf while originating the loans were contrary to Nevada law.

On June 7, 2007, Michael Carmel, a Chapter 11 Trustee was appointed in the Thomas Hantges Bankruptcy Estate. The Trustee retained Brian Shapiro, Esq of the Law Office of Brian D. Shapiro, LLC as his local Las Vegas Bankruptcy counsel and Robbin Itkin, Esq. of the Law Office of Steptoe and Johnson as his general counsel. They are currently investigating the assets and transactions of Thomas Hantges.
