= Quoeech =

- Ethnicity: Native American
- Location: Colorado River
- Population: 2,475

The Quoeech were a Native American group who lived in southern Nevada. When missionaries of the Church of Jesus Christ of Latter-day Saints arrived in Las Vegas in 1855, they were contacted by Quoeech who lived nearby. Some Quoeech were later baptized. They were also known as Diggers.

== Identification ==
People who belong to the Quoeech are known as the Quechan or as Yuma. They are familiar as California Indian people of the fertile Colorado River valley who share some traditions of the Southwest Indians. The Quoeech used to reside at riverside hamlets. They built houses with log frameworks covered with sand, brush, or wattle and daub. The word Quechan means ‘the people who descended by way of the water’.

== Demographics ==
In 1540, the population count of the Quoeech was about 4,000 before their contact with the Spaniards. The count declined to around 1000 around the early 1900s. Their population was about 2000 in 1988. Some two-thirds of the Quoeech used to live on or close to the reservation.

== Economy ==
The Quoeech are mainly an agriculture community. They own thousands of acres of agricultural land which they lease to Indian and non-Indian farmers. Their seasons include hot summer and less cold winter. The tribe own 5 trailers and RV parks. They have a tribal police department and court system. The community has 1 grocery store, museum, casino, utility company, a fish and game department, and a seasonal parking lot in Andrade, CA. Besides agricultural use, and a sand and gravel operation, and a substantial tourism industry. In accordance with the most recently collected data of the Tribal Enrollment Office, the count of population of the Quoeech is 2475.

== Linguistic affiliation ==
Quechan language came from the Yuman sub-branch of the Hokan language family. Quechan who live in the far southern parts of their area may have spoken another dialect.
