= History of Nevada =

The History of Nevada as a state began when it became the 36th state on October 31, 1864, after telegraphing the Constitution of Nevada to the Congress days before the November 8 presidential election (the largest and costliest transmission ever by telegraph). Statehood was rushed to help ensure three electoral votes for Abraham Lincoln's reelection and add to the Republican congressional majorities.

Nevada's harsh climate created a fascinating environment to the people of the mid-19th century, which shaped its history and culture. Before 1858 small Mormon settlements existed along the border of Utah, with the western part stumbling along until the great silver strikes beginning in 1858 created boom towns and fabulous fortunes. After the beginning of the 20th century, profits declined while progressive reformers sought to curb capitalism. They imagined a civilized Nevada of universities, lofty idealism, and social reform. But an economic bust during the 1910s and disillusionment from failures at social reform and a population decline of nearly one-fourth meant that by 1920 Nevada had degenerated into a "beautiful desert of buried hopes." The boom returned when big-time gambling arrived in 1931, and with good transportation (especially to California metropolitan areas), the nation's easiest divorce laws, and a speculative get-rich-quick spirit, Nevada had a boom-and-bust economy that was mostly boom until the 2008 financial crisis revealed extravagant speculation in housing and casinos on an epic scale.

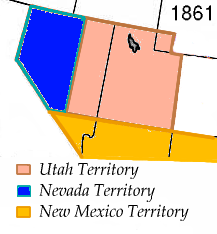
The Nevada 1861 territory boundary (blue) changed three times: 1864 statehood shifted eastern border from 39th to 38th meridian, 1866 May 5; east border (pink) moved eastward 53.3 mi (85.8 km), from the 38th to 37th meridian, and 1867 January 18; south boundary (yellow) moved from the 37th parallel north southward to the current boundary (14 Stat. 43)

== Early history ==
Geologic events formed the state's Basin and Range topography, the "Nevada Basin" physiographic region, and the central Nevada desert (e.g., the recession of the Pleistocene Lake Lahontan changed the Humboldt River course), and Great Basin. The Paiute, Shoshone, Quoeech, Washoe, and Walapai tribes had inhabited Nevada for millennia before Euro-Americans arrived in the 18th century.

=== Prehistory ===
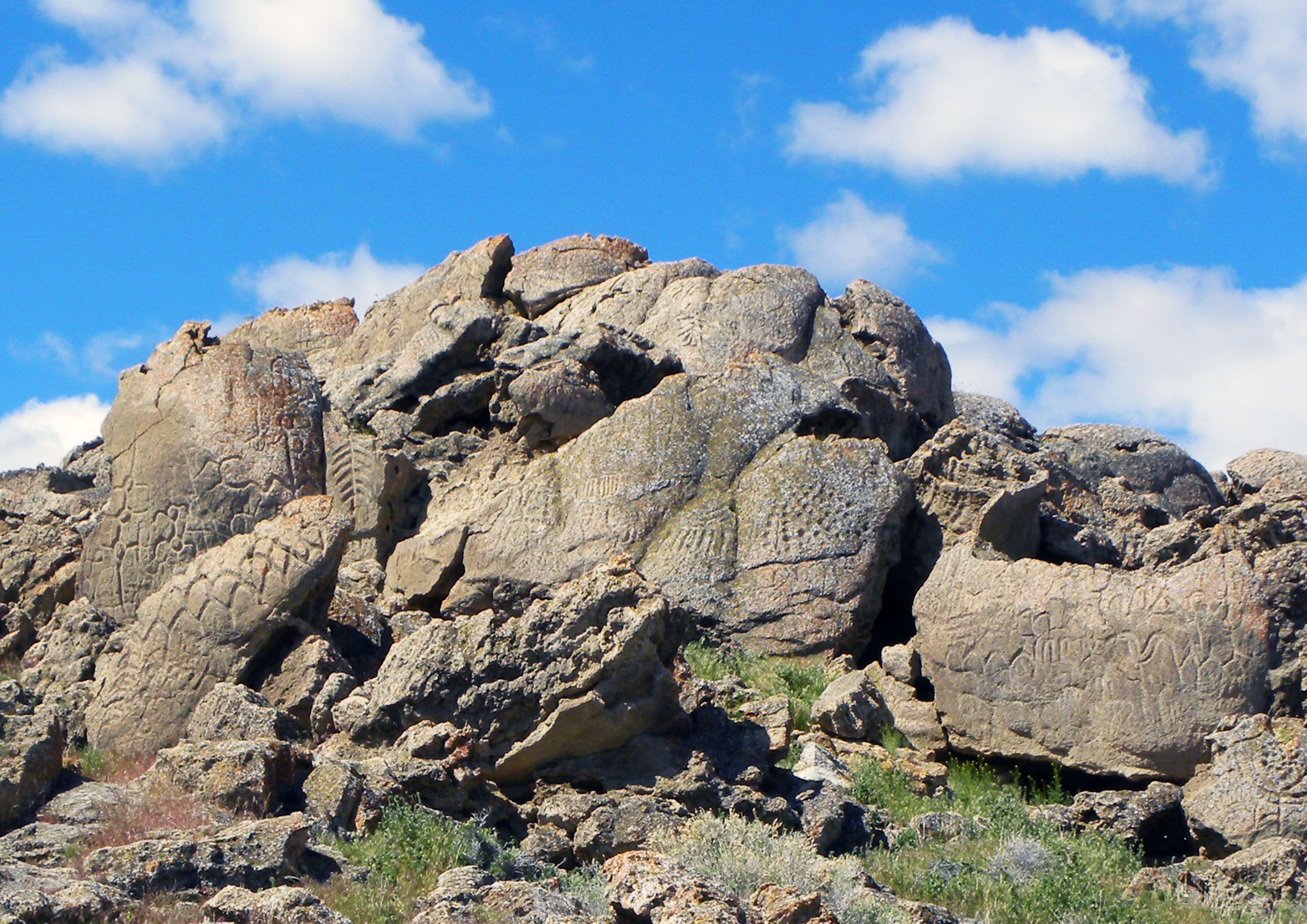
Winnemucca Lake petroglyphs; researchers dated the carvings to between 14,800 and 10,500 years ago.

During the Late Precambrian, eastern and southern Nevada was being gradually covered by a shallow sea, which continued to expand into the state through the Devonian. More than 500 kinds of Paleozoic invertebrates are known to have inhabited Nevada during the Cambrian, Devonian, and Carboniferous periods of the Paleozoic era. Near the end of the Devonian, an interval of mountain building called the Antler Orogeny began, and it continued into the Early Carboniferous. Dropping sea levels exposed regions of Nevada as dry land, contributing to the formation of environments in eastern Nevada such as lagoons and beaches. Nevada's sea level continued to drop during the Triassic period, but the western part of the state was still relatively deep. By the Jurassic, the only deep marine habitats of Nevada were in the northwestern part of the state, central Nevada was only under shallow water, and eastern and southern Nevada were characterized by other types of environment such as wetlands. During the Cretaceous, a volcanic island chain formed in far western Nevada.

During the Cenozoic geologic upheaval, Basin and Range physiographic province was created, which formed woodlands harboring trees like oaks, redwoods, and willows and wildlife including horses, mammoths, and rhinos. Nevada's Sierra Nevada Mountains were later also formed, with wildlife in the region including camels, horses, mammoths, and giant ground sloths. The Cenozoic period was high in volcanic activity, and eruptions regularly shook. Nevada's trace fossil record from the Pleistocene is very rich, and creatures included birds, giant sloths, horses, lions, mastodons, and wolves. In the present day, some fossils from these two periods are preserved at state parks in Nevada such as Ice Age Fossils State Park and Tule Springs Fossil Beds National Monument, both near Las Vegas.

The oldest known petroglyphs in North America are in the Great Basin. Near the banks of Winnemucca Lake in Nevada, this rock art dates between 10,500 and 14,800 years ago.

Archaeologists called the local period 9,000 BCE to 400 CE the Great Basin Desert Archaic Period. This was followed by the time of the Fremont culture, who were hunter-gatherers and agriculturalists. Numic language-speakers, ancestors of today's Western Shoshone and both Northern Paiute people and Southern Paiute people entered the region around the 14th century CE.

=== Exploration, New Spain, and Mexico ===
In the 1770s, Franciscan missionary Francisco Garcés, born in Morata del Conde, Aragon, Spain in 1738, was the first European in the area. Nevada was annexed as a part of the Spanish Empire in the northwestern territory of New Spain. Nevada became a part of Alta California (Upper California) province in 1804 when the Californias were split. With the Mexican War of Independence won in 1821, the province of Alta California became a territory of Mexico. In later years, a desire for increased autonomy led to several attempts by the Alta Californians to gain independence from Mexico.

Jedediah Smith entered the Las Vegas Valley in 1827, and Peter Skene Ogden traveled the Humboldt River in 1828. As a result of the Mexican–American War and the Treaty of Guadalupe Hidalgo, Mexico permanently lost Alta California in 1848. The new areas acquired by the United States continued to be administered as territories. As part of the Mexican Cession (1848) and the subsequent California Gold Rush that used Emigrant Trails through the area, the state's area evolved first as part of the Utah Territory, then the Nevada Territory (March 2, 1861; named for the Sierra Nevada). The capital is Carson City.

=== Territory ===
Nevada became part of the United States with the Treaty of Guadalupe Hidalgo with Mexico in 1848. Mexico had never established any control in Nevada, but American mountain men were in Washoe (the early name for Nevada) as early as 1827. A permanent American presence began in 1851 when the Mormons set up way stations en route to the California goldfields. In the absence of any governmental authority, some 50 Mormons and non-Mormon prospectors and cattle ranchers drew up the "Washoe code" to deal with land claims; its coverage eventually covered other governmental issues. There still was no federal presence in the area so religious tensions worsened and petitions of complaint went to Washington. Non-Mormons sought annexation to California. Utah Territory countered this by incorporating the area as a county. When Federal troops were sent to Utah in 1857, the Mormons left Washoe. The non-Mormons took over and launched a move for separate territorial status.

The early 1860s saw the end of an Indian war, the great Comstock mining boom of 1859 in Virginia City and the coming of the Civil War. The provisional territorial government led to the creation of the Nevada Territory by Congress in 1861. The pragmatic attempts to establish workable frontier institutions had failed and the paternalistic territorial system was welcomed.

=== Statehood ===
Map of the States of California and Nevada by SB Linton, 1876

Statehood came in 1864 following a Carson City convention (July 4–28) and a public vote on September 7 (the population of 6,857 in 1860 increased to 42,941 in 1870), although Nevada had far fewer than the 60,000 people usually required.

The University of Nevada was founded in Elko in 1874 and moved to Reno in 1885 (extension classes began at Las Vegas in 1951).

=== Water sources ===
The largest United States reservoir (Lake Mead) was created by the Hoover Dam on the state's 1867 Colorado River border (construction began in 1931). From 1930 to 2000, the Clark County population grew from 8,532 to 1,375,765; while the Reno population increased from 18,529 to 180,480.

=== Mining ===
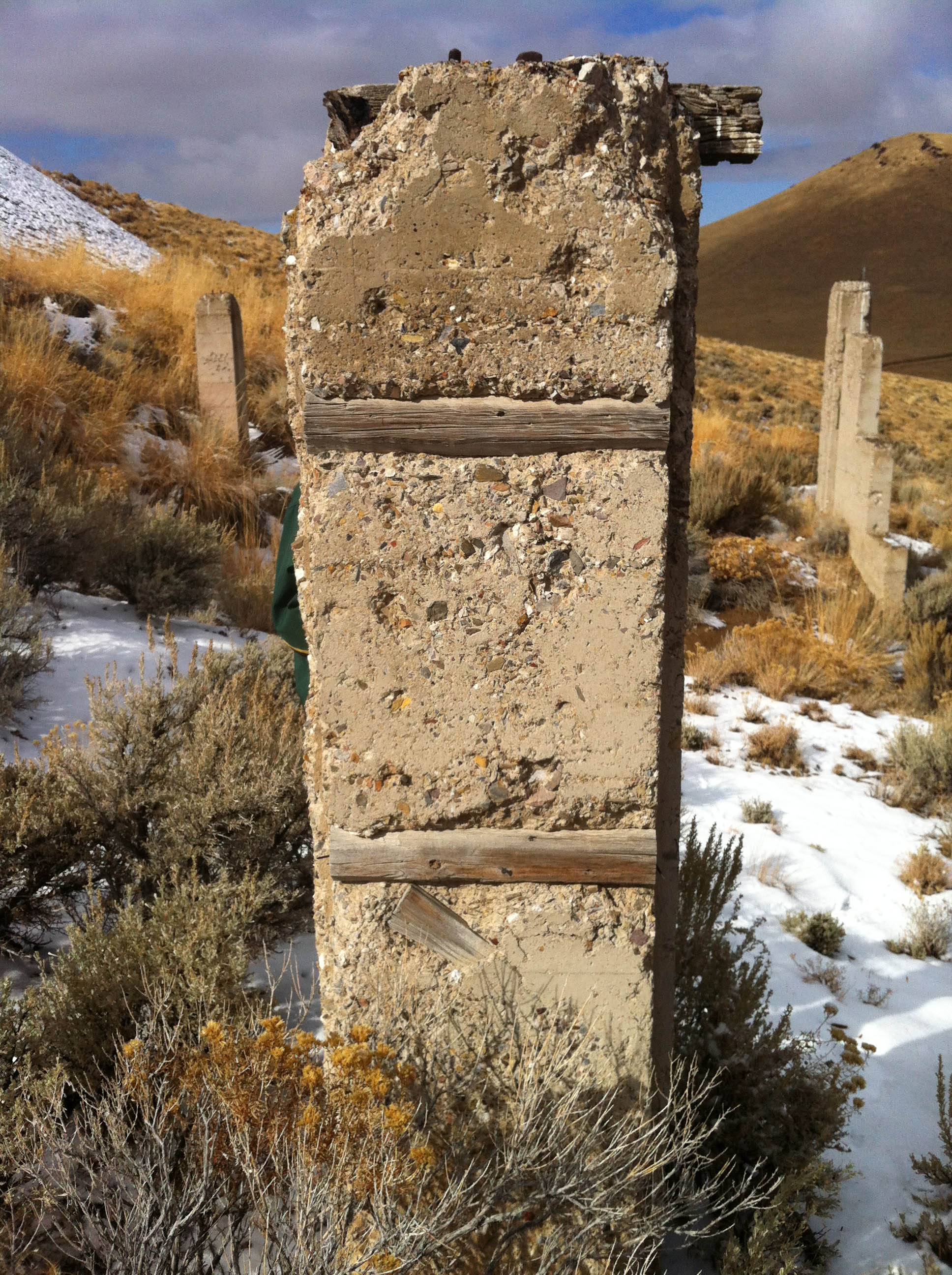
Ruins of an early 20th-century mill, Winnemucca Mountain

The 1859 Comstock Lode discovery opened the era of silver mining in Nevada, and attracted thousands of miners—most from California. It was discovered by James Finney in Carson County. Disputes over the legal limits of a claim soon went to court, as the Law of the Apex, used to determine those limits, was unworkable for the deep ore bodies in the Comstock. The legal and judicial system of Carson County was unprepared for the tremendous demands placed on it. Judges were underpaid and underqualified, bribery of witnesses and jurors was commonplace, vague record-keeping created nearly insurmountable difficulties with property titles, and evidence was often destroyed. Though workable mining laws still were needed, the resignation of the entire territorial supreme court in 1864 did cause litigation to stop and allowed mining work to resume.

There was a gold rush that created Aurora in (1860). Located on the disputed border with California, at one time Aurora was the county seat of counties in California and Nevada until the boundary dispute was settled locating Aurora in Nevada.

The 1867 expansion of the state's southern boundary was prompted by the discovery of gold in the area since officials thought Nevada would be better able to oversee the expected gold rush. By 1872, Nevada mining was an industry of speculation and immense wealth. After 1870, however, the mining industry went into eclipse, as the state's Silverite politicians worked to secure laws to require the federal government to purchase silver.

The discovery of silver and gold in 1910 near Tonopah set off a boom that ended Nevada's Economic depression.

The operators used the best available technology to recover gold and silver from ore, but by modern standards, there were many inefficiencies and chemical pollution. Methods included the use of the arrastra, the patio process, the Freiberg process, and the Washoe pan process. Estimates of value lost through recovery processes ran as high as 25%. Mine operators sought improved technology but were unwilling to wait years or decades for it to arrive. No one at the time understood the health problems such metals as mercury could cause.

=== Transportation ===
Although the transcontinental railroad crossed the state in 1869, most towns and mines were remote from it and required a network of wagon freight and stagecoaches. Numerous small companies supplied the horses, mules, and wagons for hauling borax and silver ore. Stagecoaches were notoriously uncomfortable across the roadless land, but were better than the alternatives and flourished until a railroad finally arrived. Hold-ups were rare and usually involved petty theft since armed guards were an effective deterrent. Mail contracts kept stage lines afloat and allowed the emergence of a class of entrepreneurs who won contracts and subcontracted the actual work.

The Eureka and Palisade Railroad was a narrow-gauge railroad ninety miles long built-in 1875 to carry silver-lead ore from Eureka, Nevada, to the Southern Pacific Railroad trunk line that ran through Palisade. Traffic on the line gradually decreased due to the effects of flood, fire, competition from road traffic, and dwindling amounts of ore extracted in Eureka. The rails and rolling stock of the last surviving narrow-gauge railroad in Nevada were removed in 1938.

Historic highways include the 1937 US 6 and 1919 US 50 (Lincoln Highway). The 1926 destination of the first airmail flight was Elko. Interstate 15 in Nevada was completed in 1974, while the Lovelock bypass was the last completed section of Interstate 80 in Nevada.

Amtrak's Desert Wind served Las Vegas until 1997. When service ended, Las Vegas became one of the country's largest metropolitan areas without long-distance passenger rail service. Since 1997, numerous proposals have been made to reintroduce passenger service in some form, including the Las Vegas Railway Express ("X-Train"). In 2024 construction started on a high speed rail project by Brightline West to link Las Vegas with Southern California.

=== Mining towns ===
During construction of the Sutro Tunnel, the company town of Sutro was created at the lower end of the tunnel. At one time, boasting a population of 600–800 people some speculating up to 3,000. A church, a weekly newspaper, and a post office that was in operation from March 1872 until October 1920.

Golconda was a mining town in northern Nevada built when the discovery of copper, silver, gold, and lead brought entrepreneurs who opened mines and mills in the district. A diverse society of native-born Americans, French, Portuguese, Paiutes, Chinese, and other people came to Golconda to live and work. From 1898 to 1910, the town had a train depot, several hotels, a school, businesses, newspapers, and two brothels. Its population peaked at about six hundred in 1907–08. Although boosters predicted growth for Golconda, after 1910 the mines played out, leaving the region as an area of ranches and farms. Most of the town's buildings from its mining heyday are gone, and Golconda today is a minor stop on Interstate 80.

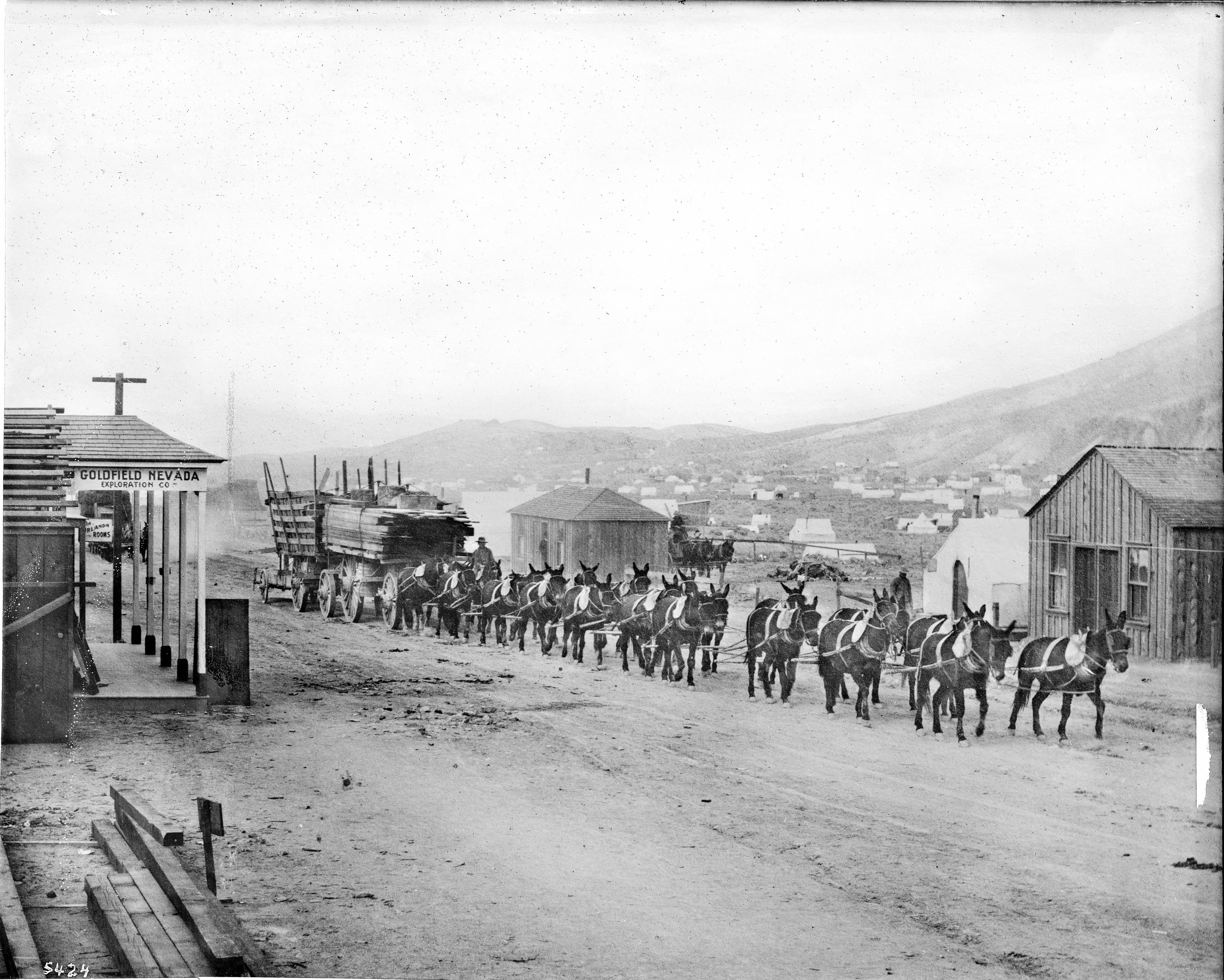
A burro-drawn wagon hauling lumber and supplies into Goldfield, Nevada, ca.1904. In 1903 only 36 people lived in the new town. By 1908 Goldfield was Nevada's largest city, with over 25,000 inhabitants.

Tuscarora was founded in Elko County after an expedition by trader William Heath discovered gold. As miners flocked to the town in 1867–70, a fort was built to offer protection from Indian raids and a water ditch was created to supply the town with water. Many Chinese men who had been employed by the Central Pacific Railroad (CPRR) relocated to the town and began placer mining. A second boom began following the discovery of silver in 1876–77.

A strike at Tonopah (1900, silver) was followed by strikes in Goldfield (1902–1919, gold) and Rhyolite (1904–1911, gold). The strikes brought Nevada to the forefront of the nation again, just as the Comstock Lode in Virginia City, Nevada, had in the late 1800s. While the Comstock made dozens of owners rich, the gold in Goldfield and the stock sold on speculation made two people exceedingly rich.

George S. Nixon and George Wingfield were worth $30 million after taking their Goldfield Consolidated Mining Company public in 1906. The partners had a loss the following year and Nixon's Nye County Bank struggled.

Wingfield, however, reaped an even greater fortune from real estate, especially after moving to Reno, Nevada. After gambling was legalized in 1931, Wingfield again had money coming in from his leases and a partnership in several casinos.

As many Nevada towns went through the boom and bust cycle, gambling keep the state's economy strong. However, remnants of mining resulted in the 1989 designation of the Carson River Mercury (Superfund) Site

Rio Tinto was developed after the discovery of copper in Northern Elko County's Cope Mining District. The town moved from mine to mine and it went from boom to bust in regular cycles. In 1919 Frank Hunt discovered copper in the area and later named his claim Rio Tinto. Once investors and big mining companies became interested in Hunt's copper, the town soon developed and filled with homes to house the miners. After all the copper was removed, Rio Tinto suffered the same fate as most boom towns and vanished.

== Homesteading ==
Over 87% of the Nevada area is owned by the federal government, as homesteads of maximum 640 acres (2.6 km^{2}) in the arid state were generally too little land for a viable farm. Instead, early settlers would homestead land surrounding a water source, and then graze cattle on the adjacent public land, which is useless without access to water. The Enlarged Homestead Act of 1909, the establishment of a state dry-farming experiment station, and private promotional efforts stimulated dry farming within a fifty-mile radius of Wells, Nevada, but a combination of low precipitation, intense flash flooding, short summers, abundant jackrabbits, mediocre soil, and the faulty judgment of the settlers themselves virtually ended the ill-favored experiment after 1916.

== Twentieth century ==
Flag of Nevada, 1905–1915

The state was by far the smallest in terms of population. The 1930 census reported 91,000 people, with Reno the largest city at 19,000 and Las Vegas at 5,000. 62% of the people lived in towns with fewer than 2,500 people or in rural areas alongside the 340,000 cattle and 830,000 sheep.

- Nickname: "The Silver State",
- Motto: "All For Our Country" (1866)
- Flower: sagebrush (1917)
- Tree: single-leaf pinyon (1953)

- (the 1929 flag used the words "Battle Born", and "Nevada" was added in 1991).

=== Politics ===
The gold discovery in Tonopah in 1900 brought together a group of men who dominated Nevada politics for a half century. They included George Wingfield (mine owner, banker and behind-the-scenes player); George Nixon (banker, editor and cofounder of the Silver party); Key Pittman (U.S. Senator), Vail Pittman (Key Pittman's brother; governor); Pat McCarran (U.S. Senator) and George Thatcher (a leader of the state Democratic party)

John Edward Jones and Reinhold Sadler, Silver Party governors of Nevada, during 1895–1903, shared like backgrounds and rose to political power by the same route. Each was a European immigrant who came to the state in its mining boom of the 1870s, prospered financially, and engaged in politics until the boom collapsed late in the 1870s. Then Jones and Sadler embraced bimetallism and a companion cure-all for Nevada's economic ills—reclamation of desert land in order to provide an economy based partly on agriculture.

=== Religion and ethnicity ===
Because most of Nevada was sparsely populated and was subject to economic booms-and-busts accompanied by population fluctuations, Catholic churches faced difficulties in serving spiritually their scattered and mobile communicants. Nevada Catholic parish life until 1900 reflected the Irish heritage of its parish clergy and the bulk of their flocks. Slavic, Italian, and Basque Catholics moved to the state after 1900 and sometimes allied with native-born Americans so that the traditional dominance of Irish Catholics diminished markedly by the 1930s.

Italian Americans worked in Nevada as miners, but, unlike many other immigrants, enough Italians stayed after the mining booms collapsed; they became the largest European ethnic groups by 1910. Many operated farms and ranches. Besides exercising significant economic clout, they have fundamentally influenced the Nevada social order in other ways, in part because of their persistent anticlericalism.

=== Gambling ===
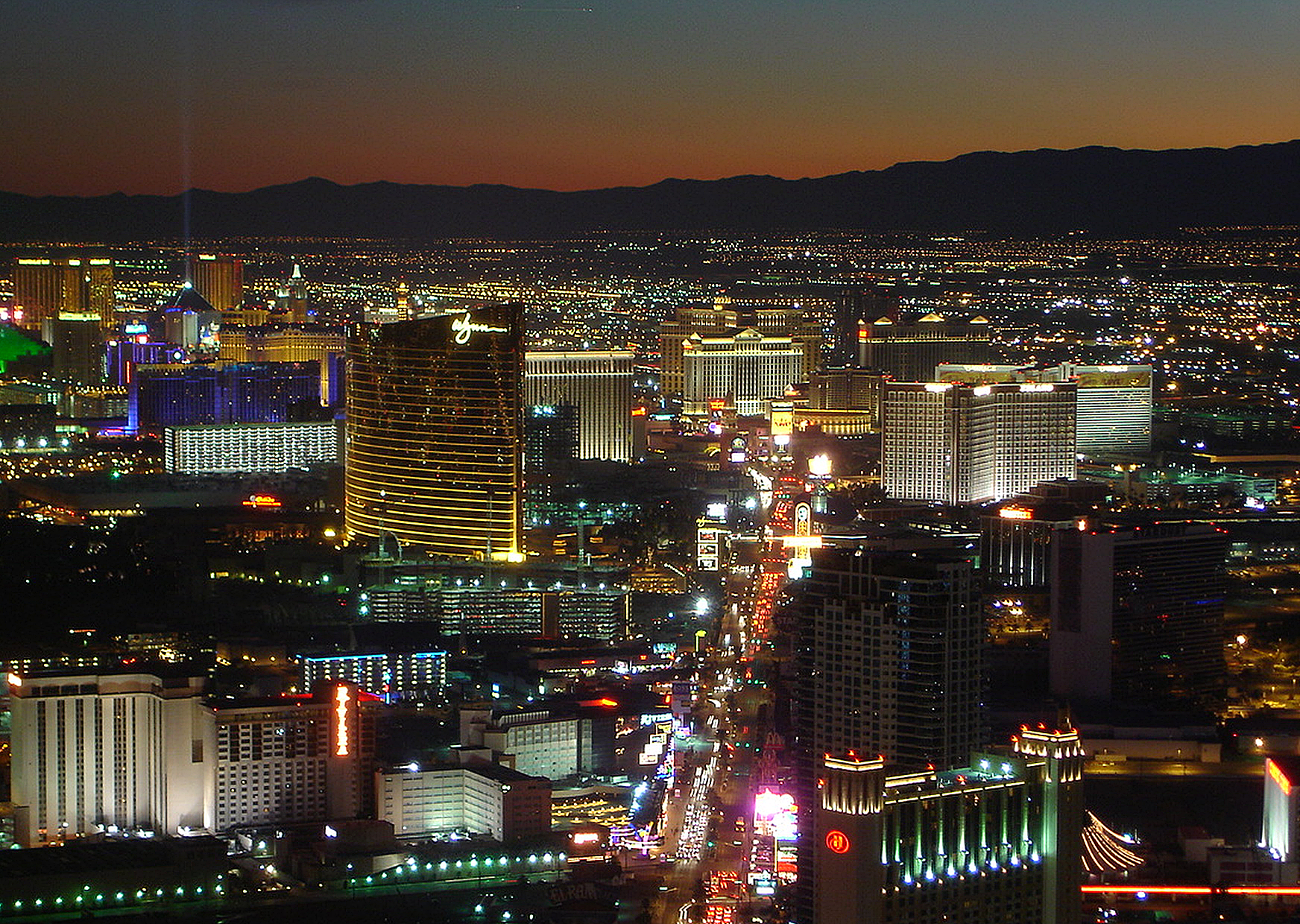
The 1931 gambling law helped enable the explosive growth of the Las Vegas area, where the population grew from five thousand in 1930 to over two million by 2013.

Because of hostility from miners and their sympathizers, Nevada's territorial and state antigambling laws were mostly unenforced from 1859 until the Comstock Lode mining booms collapsed in the 1870s. After 1881, the state attempted to restrict gambling through licensing and other statutory controls. Opponents of gambling and prostitution became organized and in the Progressive Era at last persuaded state legislators to prohibit gambling statewide in 1910 as part of a nationwide anti-gaming crusade.

During the Great Depression in the United States, Nevada legalized gambling—terming it "gaming"—in 1931; (the Northern Club received the first license). At the time, the leading proponents of gambling expected that it would be a short term fix until the state's economic base widened to include less cyclical industries. However, re-outlawing gambling has never been seriously considered since, and the industry has become Nevada's primary source of revenue today. Gambling taxes account for 34% of state revenue.

Also in 1931, the residence requirement for divorce was reduced to six weeks, making Reno, Nevada a famous mecca for the quickie divorce and people from all over the country to "take the cure." In the 1930s, Reno's Bank Club was the state's largest employer. It was also the largest casino in the world until Harold's Club surpassed it in the 1950s.

The Second World War was good to Reno economically, as local bases and those in Northern California helped boost the economy. In the late 1940s "Bugsy" Siegel helped get Las Vegas on the map by first building the most expensive casino in the world, the Flamingo, and then by being gunned down in his Beverly Hills home.

Las Vegas casinos of the 1950s were mostly low-rise building taking advantage of the wide-open spaces that Reno didn't offer in the downtown area of Virginia Street. However, Las Vegas boomed with new luxurious hotels in the 1960s and the city's gambling casinos drew players from all over the world, and away from Reno and Lake Tahoe. The 1931 gambling law helped enable the explosive growth of the Las Vegas area, where the population grew from five thousand in 1930 to over two million by 2013.

=== Prostitution ===
Brothels have been tolerated in Nevada since the middle of the 19th century; one in Elko has been in business since 1902. In 1937, a law was enacted to require weekly health checks of all prostitutes. Reno and Las Vegas had red-light districts, when the federal government prohibited all prostitution near military bases in 1942 (lifted in 1948). In 1951, both Reno and Las Vegas had closed their red-light districts as public nuisances. In Clark County, prostitution is illegal.

== Military activities ==
WWII Nevada military sites included Army Airfields (red) such as Indian Springs Army Airfield and Army/Navy ranges. (Yellow indicates Indian Springs auxiliary fields.)

Military and other government exploration of the territory included efforts by John C. Frémont (1843), Lieutenant E. G. Beckwith (1854), and the Fortieth Parallel Survey (1867). During the American Civil War, the territory mustered infantry and cavalry, and skirmishes of the American Indian Wars occurred in Nevada during the Snake War (1864–1868). American Old West forts in Nevada included Fort Churchill, Fort Halleck, Fort McDermit, and Fort Schellbourne. The current Hawthorne Army Depot was established for munitions production in 1930.

=== World War II ===
Senator Pat McCarran and other Nevada officials campaigned successfully in Washington to open military installations in Nevada. It had vast lands, sunny weather and good rail connections. The Las Vegas Army Gunnery School, the Basic Magnesium plant, Nellis Air Force Base, and other facilities brought thousands of people to the area for training as well as workers to construct housing, air strips, and other military installations.

Las Vegas Army Air Field and Tonopah AAF were created from existing airfields, and the United States Army Air Forces built four additional Nevada airfields in 1942, including Indian Springs AAF, Reno Army Air Base, and a facility near Fallon. Ranges and emergency strips included the Battle Mountain Flight Strip, the Black Rock Desert gunnery range (part of the Lovelock Aerial Gunnery Range during the Cold War), Churchill Flight Strip, and Owyhee Flight Strip. Both Tonopah AAF and Indian Springs AAF each had 5 auxiliary airstrips including Indian Springs' at Forty-Mile Canyon Field and Groom Lake Field. Camp Williston (1940–1944) at Boulder City provided security for Henderson's Basic Magnesium Plant (14,000 employees) and Hoover Dam (a concrete observation station still exists).

=== Nuclear tests ===
Nuclear testing began at the Nevada Proving Ground in 1951 with a one-kiloton bomb dropped on Frenchman Flat. Over 1000 nuclear detonations were conducted until the site's last atmospheric detonation in 1962 and last underground detonation in 1992. In 2002, Congress approved the Yucca Mountain nuclear waste repository at the site.

Notable military aircraft accidents in Nevada include the 1948 Lake Mead Boeing B-29 crash, the 1949 Stead AFB F-51 crash, and several USAF Thunderbird demonstration team crashes, including the 1982 Indian Springs AFAF formation that killed four pilots. Spy plane testing in Area 51 began in April 1955, and stealth fighter testing began in 1982 at the Tonopah Test Range, where in 2008 the last F-117 Nighthawk was retired in secure storage. The USAF Red Flag combat exercise was first held in 1975 at the Nellis Air Force Range, and the United States Navy's TOPGUN school was moved to Naval Air Station Fallon in 1996.

== Recent history ==
Nevada favors a highly individualistic political culture, giving it a libertarian–conservative political philosophy in an open society. Wealth from mining and gambling reinforced the individualistic ethic that early settlers brought with them. The libertarian ethic appears in the opposition of most Nevadans to big government, big labor, and big business. Labor unions, especially the SEIU which organizes hotel and casino workers, thrive among the minority workers in Las Vegas. Belief in limited government leads to an electorate that backs a pro-choice position on abortion while opposing the Equal Rights Amendment for women. The state's ongoing battles with the federal government involve the longstanding water rights dispute between Native Americans, backed by the federal government, and Nevada's ranchers; and the decade-long fight against the establishment of the nation's first permanent nuclear waste depository at Yucca Mountain.

In 1998, the largest industries were services (40.7% of earnings), construction (11.6%), and state/local government (10.0%).

The COVID-19 pandemic was confirmed to have reached Nevada on March 5, 2020. Because of concerns about coronavirus disease 2019 (COVID-19), Nevada governor Steve Sisolak declared a state of emergency on March 12, 2020. Four days later, Nevada reported its first death. On March 17, 2020, Sisolak ordered the closure of non-essential businesses in the state, to help prevent the spread of the coronavirus. Grocery stores were among the businesses considered essential, and restaurants were allowed to provide drive-thru, takeout, and delivery services. At the end of March 2020, Sisolak announced a 90-day moratorium on evictions and foreclosures for commercial and residential tenants. The moratorium would be extended several times over the next year.

Various protests were held against Sisolak's shutdown order beginning in April 2020. Las Vegas mayor Carolyn Goodman was also critical of the shutdown and its length, urging Sisolak to reopen the state. Goodman was widely criticized after suggesting that Las Vegas become a control group to test the effectiveness of social distancing. Nevada launched the first phase of its reopening on May 9, 2020. Restaurants, retailers, outdoor malls, and hair salons were among the businesses allowed to reopen, but with precautions in place, such as limiting occupancy to 50 percent. A second phase went into effect on May 29, 2020. It allowed for the reopening of state parks and businesses such as bars, gyms, and movie theaters. Casinos began reopening on June 4, 2020.

== See also ==
- Women's suffrage in Nevada
- Las Vegas history and timeline
- Reno history and timeline
