= List of Nevada state symbols =

Location of the state of Nevada in the United States of America

This is a list of symbols of the U.S. state of Nevada. The majority of the items in the list are officially recognized symbols created by an act of the Nevada Legislature and signed into law by the governor.

== Insignia ==
Type	Symbol	Year	Images
Flag	State seal on a blue background	1929	Nevada flag
Motto	All for our country	1886	
Nicknames	Silver State, Battle Born State, Sagebrush State	n/a	
Seal	The Seal of Nevada	1886	Seal of Nevada
Song	Home Means Nevada	1933	

== Flora ==
Type	Symbol	Year	Images
Flower	Sagebrush (Artemisia tridentata)	1917	Sagebrush
Tree	Great Basin Bristlecone pine (Pinus longaeva)	1987	Great Basin Bristlecone pine
Tree	Single-leaf Piñon (Pinus monophylla)	1959	Single-leaf pinyon
Grass	Indian ricegrass (Eriocoma hymenoides)	1977	Indian ricegass

== Fauna ==
Type	Symbol	Year	Image
Bird	Mountain bluebird (Sialia currucoides)	1967	Mountain bluebird
Animal	Desert bighorn sheep (Ovis canadensis nelsoni)	1973	Desert bighorned baby
Fish	Lahontan cutthroat trout (Oncoryhnchus clarki henshawi)	1981	Cutthroat trout
Fossil	Ichthyosaur (Shonisaurus popularis)	1977	Ichthyosaur
Reptile	Desert tortoise (Gopherus agassizii)	1989	Desert tortoise
Insect	Vivid Dancer Damselfly (Argia vivida)	2009	Vivid dancer, Argia vivida

== Geology ==
Type	Symbol	Year	Image
Mineral	Silver	1977	Silver
Rock	Sandstone	1987	Sandstone
Soil	Orovada	2001	
Element	Neon	2019	

== Culture ==
Type	Symbol	Year	Image(s)
Cocktail	Picon Punch	2025	Picon Punch served in the traditional glassware
Color	Blue and Silver	1983	
Steam locomotive	Nevada Northern Railway #40	2009	Nevada Northern Railway #40

== See also ==
- List of Nevada-related topics
- Lists of United States state insignia
- State of Nevada
