= California State Route 178 =

Highway in California

State Route 178
- SR 178 highlighted in red

Route information
- Maintained by Caltrans
- Length: 150.065 mi (241.506 km) Portions of SR 178 have been relinquished to or are otherwise maintained by local or other governments, and are not included in the length.

Western segment
- West end: SR 99 in Bakersfield
- Major intersections: SR 204 / SR 99 Bus. in Bakersfield; SR 184 near Bakersfield; SR 155 near Lake Isabella; SR 14 at Freeman Junction; US 395 near Inyokern
- East end: Pinnacle Road near Trona

Eastern segment
- West end: Jubilee Pass Road at Death Valley
- Major intersections: SR 127 at Shoshone
- East end: SR 372 towards Pahrump, NV

Location
- Country: United States
- State: California
- Counties: Kern, San Bernardino, Inyo

Highway system
- State highways in California; Interstate; US; State; Scenic; History; Pre‑1964; Unconstructed; Deleted; Freeways
← SR 177	→ SR 179

State Route 178 (SR 178) is a state highway in the U.S. state of California that exists in separate constructed segments. The western segment runs from State Route 99 in Bakersfield and over the Walker Pass in the Sierra Nevada to the turnoff for the Trona Pinnacles National Natural Landmark. Though some maps and signs mark this segment of SR 178 as continuous through Downtown Bakersfield, control of the portion between the Kern River Bridge and M Street was relinquished to the city and is thus no longer officially part of the state highway system. The eastern segment of SR 178 runs from the southeasterly part of Death Valley National Park to Nevada State Route 372 at the Nevada state line west of Pahrump. The gap between Trona Pinnacles and the southeasterly part of Death Valley is connected by various local roads and State Route 190 through the park.

SR 178 serves many different purposes. It connects Downtown Bakersfield with East Bakersfield and Lake Isabella. It is one of three crossings over the Sierra Nevada south of Yosemite (SR 120, Tioga Pass Road), connecting the southern San Joaquin Valley with the upper Mojave Desert and the Owens Valley. This also provides access to Death Valley National Park. If the unconstructed portion through Death Valley was built, it would provide a continuous route between Bakersfield and the Las Vegas Valley via Pahrump.

== Route description ==
Route 178 is defined in section 478, subsection (a), of the California Streets and Highways Code:

Route 178 is from:
(1) Bakersfield to Route 14 near Freeman via Walker Pass.
(2) Route 14 near Freeman to Route 127.
(3) Route 127 to the Nevada state line in Pahrump Valley.

The definition includes the gap that was never constructed. It also omits concurrencies with Routes 14 and 127 instead of duplicating those segments in those other routes' definitions in the code. While control of the segment of Route 178 in Bakersfield between the Kern River and M Street was relinquished by the state to the city, subdivision (b) further mandates that the city must still "maintain within its jurisdiction signs directing motorists to the continuation of Route 178".

SR 178 is part of the California Freeway and Expressway System, and through Bakersfield and Ridgecrest is part of the National Highway System, a network of highways that are considered essential to the country's economy, defense, and mobility by the Federal Highway Administration. It is eligible for the State Scenic Highway System, but it is not officially designated as a scenic highway by the California Department of Transportation.

=== Western segment ===
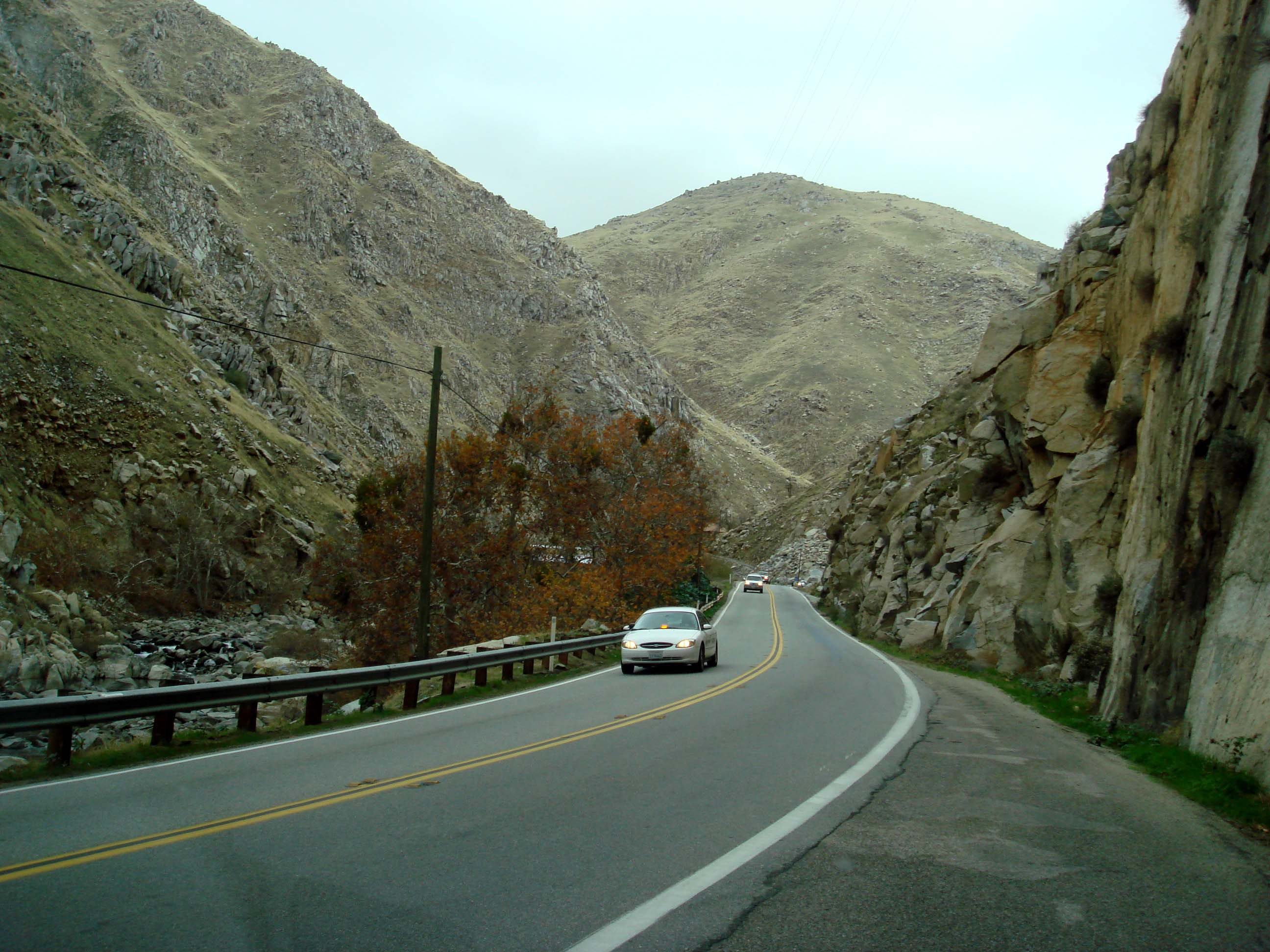
SR 178 follows the Kern River through the Kern Canyon, just northeast of Bakersfield

The western segment starts in Bakersfield at State Route 99 as 24th Street, but splits at B Street, utilizing 24th Street for westbound traffic and 23rd Street for eastbound traffic, through the central business district. Officially, the segment between the Kern River Bridge and M Street was relinquished to the city and is thus no longer legally part of the state highway system. SR 178 then becomes a freeway as it leaves Downtown and winds through East Bakersfield. The freeway then travels east as it enters Northeast Bakersfield. A mile east of the Morning Drive interchange, the freeway segment ends with the first at-grade intersection at Canteria Drive, where the road widens to a six-lane undivided expressway. The highway continues through the rural, but growing Rio Bravo neighborhood of Bakersfield, and intersects State Route 184. Turning northeast, the road narrows — first to four lanes at its intersection with Masterson Street, then to two lanes at Miramonte Drive — and continues to the mouth of the Kern River Canyon, where the highway exits the northeastern city limits of Bakersfield.

Over approximately 13 miles through the Kern Canyon, SR 178 closely follows the Kern River as a narrow two-lane road, with an average width of 18 to 24 feet. Though the speed limit on this length is signed for 55 miles per hour (89 km/h), the average travel speed is often much lower, owing to sharp turns in the road around sheer rock faces, and steep drop-offs into the river below. From the canyon mouth at 650 feet (200 m), SR 178 ascends through the lower Sierra Nevada, and climbs to its exit of the canyon at 2,250 feet (690 m). Here, the highway becomes gentler, and widens to a four-lane undivided expressway.

The route continues east and reaches the town of Lake Isabella in the Kern River Valley. The road briefly expands to a divided freeway, and meets a junction with State Route 155 at an overpass, before narrowing back to a two-lane undivided highway at the intersection with Lake Isabella Boulevard. The road then follows the south shore of the Lake Isabella Reservoir, until it reaches the town of Mountain Mesa, then continues to community of Onyx. Here, the route begins its ascent out of the Kern River Valley, and climbs from 2,795 feet (852 m) at Onyx over approximately 18 miles to the summit of Walker Pass at 5,250 feet (1,600 m). Then, the highway descends eight miles to an intersection with State Route 14 at Freeman, an elevation of 3,195 feet (974 m).

SR 178 runs concurrently with SR 14 for three miles, then proceeds eastward across the Indian Wells Valley into the city of Ridgecrest. The constructed highway then ends east of Ridgecrest at the turnoff for the Trona Pinnacles National Natural Landmark in Searles Valley. The right-of-way then continues north as the county-maintained routes of Trona Road, Trona-Wildrose Road, and then Panamint Valley Road, running through the community of Trona to SR 190 east of Panamint Springs.

=== Eastern segment ===
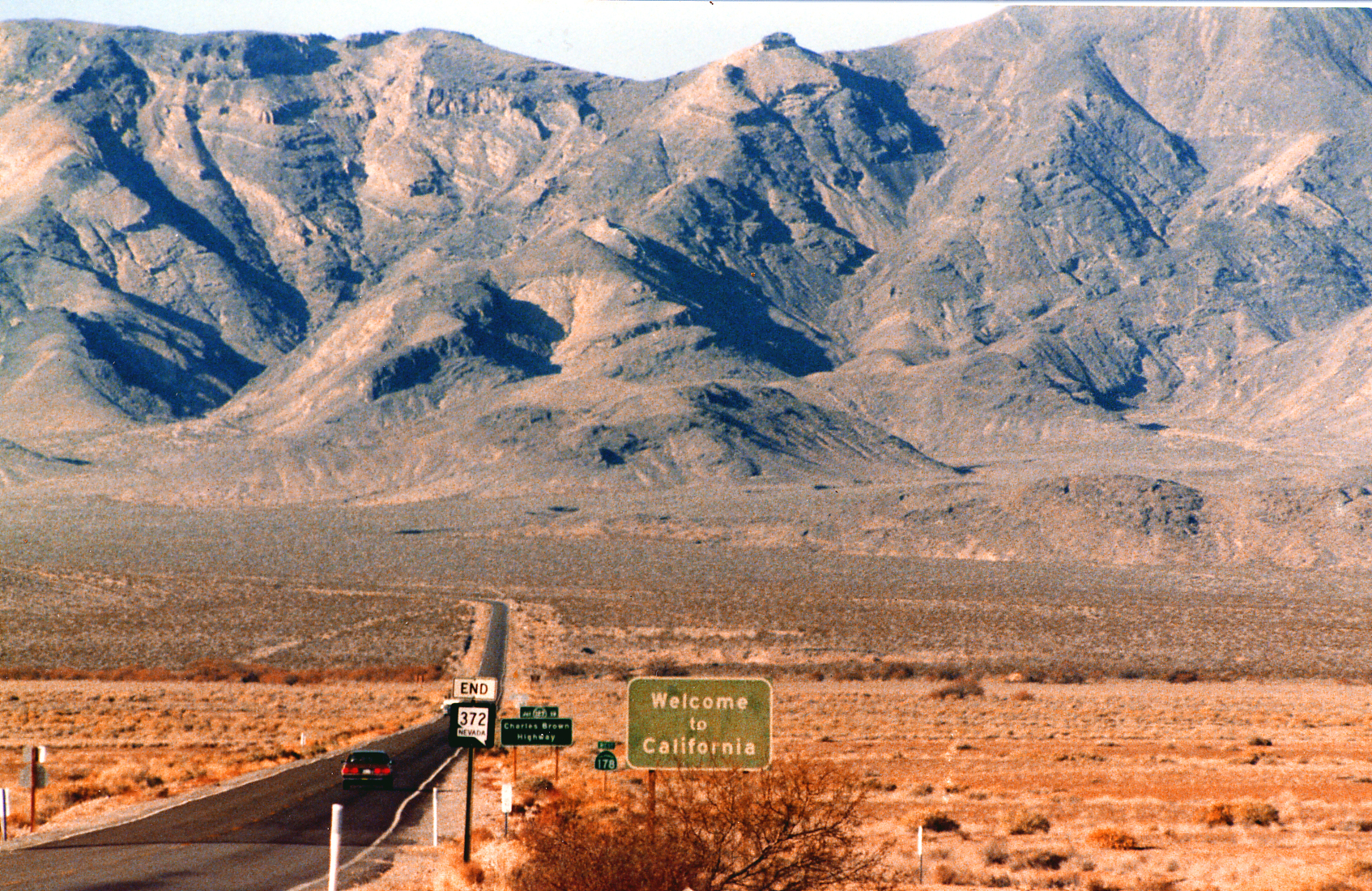
Looking west from the state line

The Eastern segment resumes four miles (6 km) west of Salisberry Pass in the southeasterly part of Death Valley National Park in Inyo County at what had been the former boundary of Death Valley National Monument until 1994. It then meets up with State Route 127. SR 178 then branches northward from SR 127 to the California-Nevada State Line. In Nevada, the roadway continues as State Route 372 ending at State Route 160 near the center of Pahrump in Nye County.

The segment of State Route 178 from State Route 127 to the California-Nevada state line, as well as all of Nevada State Route 372, are both known as the Charles Brown Highway. Charles Brown, a former California State Legislator, was a major proponent for the incorporation of the segment of State Route 178 between State Route 14 and the California-Nevada state line into the California Highway System.

== History ==
SR 178 was one of the routes created with the third bond act of 1919. It defined a route 202 miles long between Santa Maria and Freeman Junction through Bakersfield. Freeman does not exist today; it was originally located near (and later at) the junction of SR 178 and SR 14. The route was defined as Legislative Route 57. The 1919 bond act also created the first segment of LRN 58. The route was extended several times since 1919. In 1933, the final segment was added to LRN 58, which created a route from US 101 near Santa Margarita to the Nevada state line via Bakersfield. Construction on the route between Bakersfield and Isabella through Kern Canyon started in 1922. Progress moved slowly, as sheer rock walls had to be blasted with dynamite. In 1931, 9 years after construction started, the 26-mile highway segment was completed.

In 1933, with the creation of signed routes, portions of LRN 57 and LRN 58 would be signed as Route 178. LRN 58 would be signed between Route 33 and US 99, and LRN 57 would be signed between US 99 and US 6. Later, in 1947, LRN 212 was created, and defined to run from LRN 23 (signed as US 6) near Inyokern, east to the Nevada state line. It was an unsigned route.

From 1950 to 1953, a portion of SR 178 in Lake Isabella was rerouted around the Isabella Auxiliary Dam. The dam was built over the old route and parts of it are inundated by Isabella Lake. The new route goes over the dam's southern abutment and along the shoreline of Isabella Lake toward Onyx.

In 1964, all of the California routes were renumbered. LRN 58 was dropped from Route 178 and combined with the eastern portion of the decommissioned US 466 (also defined as part of LRN 58) to create SR 58. The remaining Route 178 was combined with LRN 212 to create SR 178. It was originally defined to start at SR 99 in Bakersfield, but later that year it was changed to simply start in Bakersfield. This change was probably done to avoid a cosign with SR 58 along 23rd/24th St. After SR 58 was moved to the freeway south of Brundage Lane in 1976, SR 178 was extended west to SR 99.

Construction on the initial freeway in Bakersfield was completed in 1968. It ran from M St, on the eastern edge of Downtown, through East Bakersfield to Haley Street. Eastern extensions have been constructed since 1968, one interchange at a time as the need arises. In the Kern Canyon section, which is between Bakersfield and the Kern River Valley, a bypass route was identified in 1964. By 1968, a deed from the US Forest Service issued an easement to the State for the construction of the highway through National Forest lands. The first phase of construction was completed in 1974, which created a short freeway near Lake Isabella and a 60’ wide expressway extending west to China Garden. Subsequent phases were not funded.

=== Abandoned western freeway extension ===
The freeway portion of Route 178, completed in the late 1950s, ends as it approaches downtown Bakersfield from the east. Weak public support and subsequent lack of funds hindered efforts to complete the freeway through downtown and Westchester to its proposed terminus at the beginning of the modern-day Westside Parkway. Although freeway alternatives through various neighborhoods have been studied several times following the existing portion's completion in 1968, the city of Bakersfield never formally endorsed a route. Caltrans formally announced preference for an alignment through downtown and Westchester in 1973, but fierce public opposition coupled with the historic integrity of the neighborhoods slated to be demolished greatly hindered momentum of the project. In 1977, then-Governor Jerry Brown issued a moratorium on all new freeway construction. Formal studies on possible routes continued and resulted in recommendations of a more southern alignment near Truxtun Avenue executed by the Kern Council of Governors (KernCOG) in 1986 and the 2001 Bakersfield System Study.

A Westchester alignment would have extended the freeway west from its current terminus at M Street and through Downtown Bakersfield in the vicinity of 23rd street. As it continued through Westchester the freeway would turn southwest, cross under SR 99 and terminate at the newly completed Westside Parkway.

A southern alignment would start at SR 178 at Baker Street, about 0.7 miles east of its current terminus. From there, it would turn southwest and run parallel to Baker Street, through East Bakersfield, to the BNSF railroad yard. It would then turn west and run south of the railroad tracks through the southern end of Downtown Bakersfield. At Bakersfield High School, it would run north of the tracks (avoiding the high school). It would continue under SR 99 and terminate at Westside Parkway.

=== City of Bakersfield 24th Street Improvements ===
In 2006, the California State Legislature passed Assembly Bill 1858 to authorize the relinquishment of the downtown Bakersfield segment to the city's control.

Still needing to address the increasing crosstown congestion and with a freeway through downtown effectively out of the question, the City of Bakersfield approved construction to increase capacity on 24th Street through Westchester and 23rd and 24th streets through Downtown using TRIP funds. The project widened, realigned and re-striped 24th Street from west of State Route 99 to east of M Street, as well as realigned and re-striped 23rd Street from west of C Street to east of M Street, in order to add two travel lanes (one in each direction) to the roadway. The project also encompassed improvements to the 24th Street/State Route 99 interchange and widened the Oak Street/24th Street intersection. This solution required the acquisition of several properties north of 24th Street, which was completed in early 2015, as well as the closure of access of B Street through Elm Street from the north. The project was completed in December 2020.

== Future ==
=== Death Valley Segment ===
This segment is unconstructed from 15 miles east of Ridgecrest to 15 miles west of SR 127 (10 miles from the eastern boundary of the Death Valley National Park at what had been its former boundary prior to 1994). The state is considering three options: select an alignment to connect with the current eastern segment at its present location; select an alignment to avoid traversing the Death Valley Wilderness; or delete this unconstructed segment from the State Highway System.

The County of Inyo has offered three alternatives:

- The State of California rescinds the unconstructed portion of SR 178.
- The State of California rescinds the unconstructed portion of SR 178 and adopts Trona Road, Trona-Wildrose Road, and Panamint Valley Road.
- The State of California rescinds the unconstructed portion of SR 178 and adopts Trona Road, Trona-Wildrose Road, and Panamint Valley Road; Inyo County adopts portions of SR 178 and SR 190, and Death Valley National Park adopts the portion of SR 178 that connects to Badwater Road in the park.

=== Ridgecrest-Inyokern Pavement Project ===
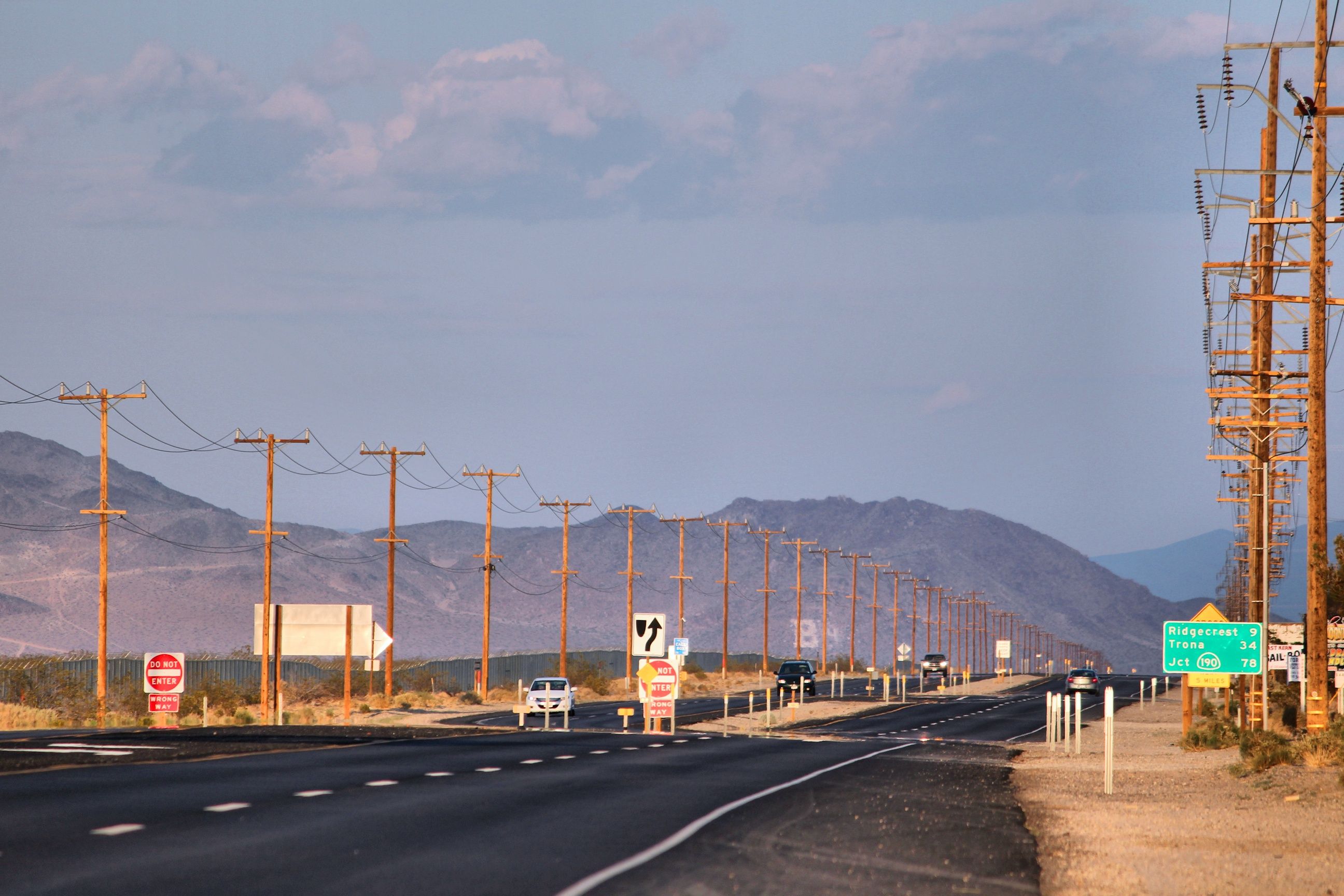
SR 178 in Inyokern

On March 26, 2024, Caltrans District 9 proposed the Ridgecrest-Inyokern Pavement Project, rehabilitating 24 lane miles of SR 178 from PM 88.6 in Kern County to PM 104.6 at the San Bernardino County line. The purpose of the project is to preserve existing pavement and improve ride quality. Other improvements on the highway will include updated signal lights, traffic signs, and Class II bike lanes, among other improvements. Construction is set to begin August 2030.

== Major intersections ==
Except where prefixed with a letter, postmiles were measured on the road as it was in 1964, based on the alignment that existed at the time, and do not necessarily reflect current mileage. Postmile prefixes include: R reflecting a realignment in the route since then, M indicating a second realignment, L referring to an overlap due to a correction or change, and T indicating postmiles classified as temporary. Segments that remain unconstructed or have been relinquished to local control may be omitted. The numbers reset at county lines; the start and end postmiles in each county are given in the county column.

County	Location	Postmile	Exit	Destinations	Notes
Kern; KER 0.00-104.62	Bakersfield	0.00		Rosedale Highway	Continuation beyond SR 99; former SR 58 west
Kern; KER 0.00-104.62	Bakersfield	0.00		SR 99 – Sacramento, Los Angeles	Interchange; west end of SR 178; former SR 58 east (as a former overlap); SR 99 north exit 26A, south exit 26
Kern; KER 0.00-104.62	Bakersfield	0.195	East end of state maintenance		
Kern; KER 0.00-104.62	Bakersfield	0.23	Bridge over the Kern River		
Kern; KER 0.00-104.62	Bakersfield	0.36		Oak Street south	Former Legislative Route 141 south
Kern; KER 0.00-104.62	Bakersfield	1.48– 1.50		Chester Avenue – Central District	Serves Adventist Health Bakersfield Medical Center
Kern; KER 0.00-104.62	Bakersfield	R1.71		M Street	West end of state maintenance
Kern; KER 0.00-104.62	Bakersfield		West end of freeway		
Kern; KER 0.00-104.62	Bakersfield	R2.01	2A	Q Street, Golden State Avenue (SR 204, SR 99 Bus.)	Eastbound exit and westbound entrance; eastbound exit connects to 178 Frontage Road, and westbound entrance to 24th Street, both are part of unsigned SR 178S
Kern; KER 0.00-104.62	Bakersfield	R2.01	2A	SR 204 north (Golden State Avenue, SR 99 Bus. north)	Westbound exit and eastbound entrance
Kern; KER 0.00-104.62	Bakersfield	R2.41	2B	Union Avenue (SR 204 south, SR 99 Bus. south)	Former US 99 south; serves Dignity Health – Memorial Hospital
Kern; KER 0.00-104.62	Bakersfield	R3.40	3	Beale Avenue	
Kern; KER 0.00-104.62	Bakersfield	R4.10	4	Haley Street	Eastbound exit and westbound entrance
Kern; KER 0.00-104.62	Bakersfield	R4.63	5	Mount Vernon Avenue	Serves Kern Medical Center
Kern; KER 0.00-104.62	Bakersfield	R5.64	6	Oswell Street	
Kern; KER 0.00-104.62	Bakersfield	R6.77	7	Fairfax Road	
Kern; KER 0.00-104.62	Bakersfield	R7.76	8	Morning Drive	
Kern; KER 0.00-104.62	Bakersfield		East end of freeway		
Kern; KER 0.00-104.62	Bakersfield	T9.61		SR 184 south (Kern Canyon Road) – Lamont, Los Angeles	Northern terminus of SR 184
Kern; KER 0.00-104.62	Lake Isabella		West end of freeway		
Kern; KER 0.00-104.62	Lake Isabella	R41.65	42	Bodfish, Lake Isabella (Elizabeth Norris Road)	
Kern; KER 0.00-104.62	Lake Isabella	R42.94	43	SR 155 west – Wofford Heights, Lake Isabella, Kernville	Eastern terminus of SR 155
Kern; KER 0.00-104.62	Lake Isabella		East end of freeway		
Kern; KER 0.00-104.62	Mountain Mesa	50.27		McCray Road – Squirrel Valley	Serves Kern Valley Hospital
Kern; KER 0.00-104.62	Weldon	55.68		Sierra Way – Kernville	Serves Kern Valley Airport
Kern; KER 0.00-104.62		79.73	Walker Pass, elevation 5,250 feet (1,600 m)		
Kern; KER 0.00-104.62	Freeman Junction	88.26 57.77 (Note: Indicates that the postmile represents the distance along SR 14 rather than SR 178.)		SR 14 south (Aerospace Highway) – Mojave	West end of SR 14 overlap; former US 6 south
Kern; KER 0.00-104.62		60.57 88.38		SR 14 north (Aerospace Highway) – Bishop	East end of SR 14 overlap; former US 6 north
Kern; KER 0.00-104.62		R93.24		US 395 – Bishop, San Bernardino	Interchange; west end of US 395 Bus. overlap
Kern; KER 0.00-104.62	Ridgecrest	100.60		Inyokern Road, China Lake Boulevard (Sandquist Road) – NAWS China Lake	
Kern; KER 0.00-104.62	Ridgecrest	102.61		US 395 Bus. south (China Lake Boulevard) to US 395 / Ridgecrest Boulevard	East end of US 395 Bus. overlap; China Lake Boulevard serves Cerro Coso Community College
San Bernardino; SBD 0.00-14.78		7.35		Trona Road – Red Mountain	
San Bernardino; SBD 0.00-14.78		14.78		Trona Pinnacles (Pinnacle Road)	East end of western segment of SR 178
San Bernardino; SBD 0.00-14.78		14.78		Trona Road – Trona, Furnace Creek	Continuation beyond the Trona Pinnacles turnoff
Gap in route
Inyo; INY 28.00-62.19		28.00		Jubilee Pass Road – Badwater	Continuation beyond the west end of eastern segment of SR 178, at the former Death Valley National Monument boundary
Inyo; INY 28.00-62.19		42.92 16.25 (Note: Indicates that the postmile represents the distance along SR 127 rather than SR 178.)		SR 127 north to US 95	West end of SR 127 overlap
Inyo; INY 28.00-62.19	Shoshone	14.75 42.93		SR 127 south – Baker	East end of SR 127 overlap
Inyo; INY 28.00-62.19		62.19		SR 372 east – Pahrump	Continuation into Nevada; east end of SR 178
1.000 mi = 1.609 km; 1.000 km = 0.621 mi: Concurrency terminus; Incomplete access
