= Carpenter Canyon =

Canyon in Nevada, United States

Coordinates: 36°10′50″N 115°47′28″W

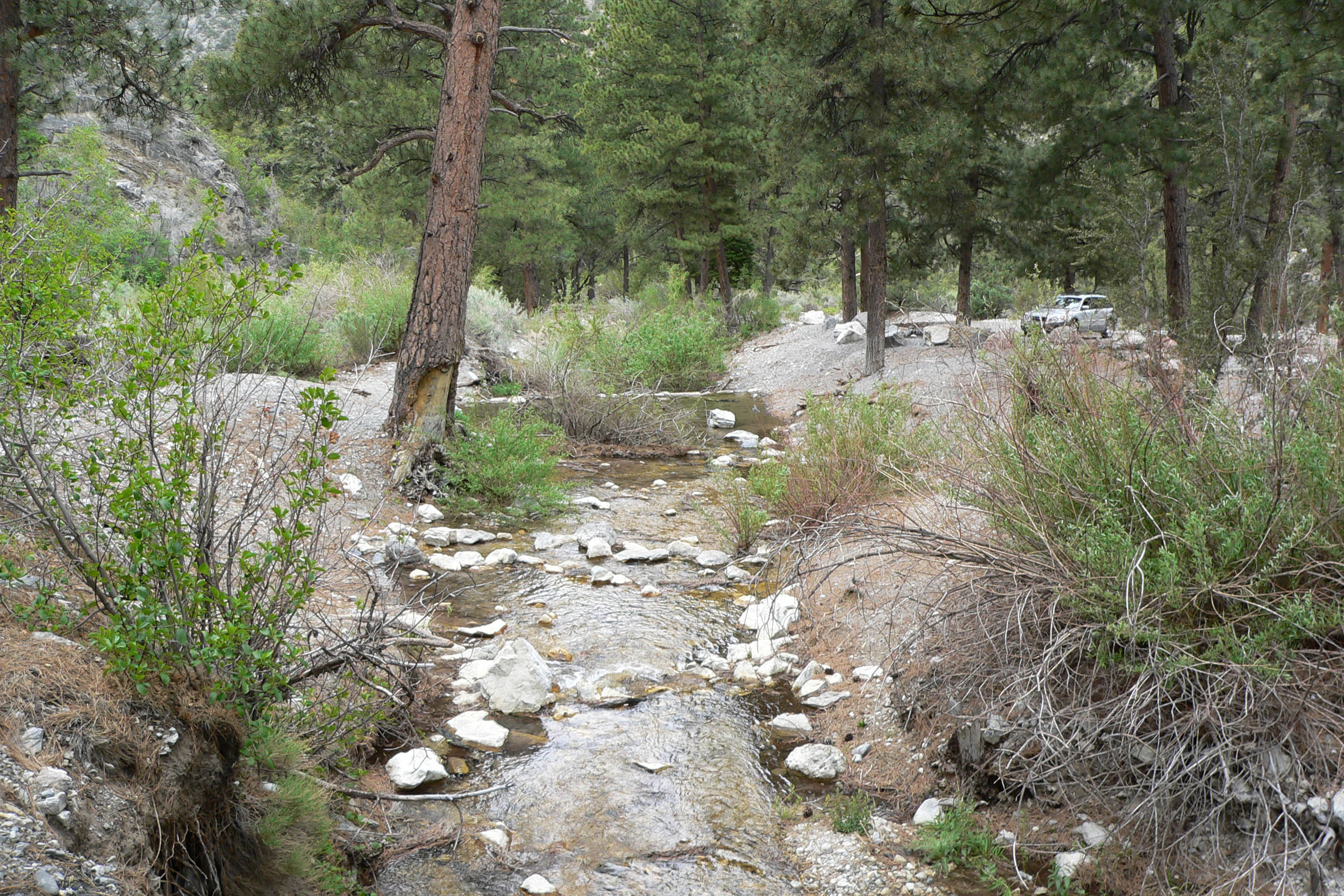
Carpenter Canyon with creek on the western side of the Spring Mountains, Nevada

Carpenter Canyon is a canyon on the western side of the Spring Mountains, partially within the Humboldt-Toiyabe National Forest, in Clark County, southern Nevada west of the Las Vegas Valley.

Carpenter Canyon is accessible via State Route 160 and Carpenter Canyon Road near Pahrump. Carpenter Canyon Road is a minimally maintained dirt road reaching roughly 10 miles into the mountains and Humboldt-Toiyabe National Forest. A clearwater stream, the Carpenter Canyon Creek, runs through Carpenter Canyon the entire year, supporting a small population of trout, which is uncommon in the Spring Mountains and Mojave Desert.

== Natural history ==
=== Geology ===
The Spring Mountains divide the Pahrump Valley, Mesquite Valley, and upper Amargosa River basin to the west from the Las Vegas Valley, to the east and which drains into the Colorado River, thus the mountains define part of the boundary of the Great Basin and Mojave Desert ecoregions. A number of springs can be found in the recesses of the Red Rock Canyon area which lies on the mid-eastern side of the range. One of the more notable springs feeds Carpenter Canyon Creek.

=== Plants ===
In Lower Carpenter Canyon, Creosote bush - Larrea tridentata and golden native bunchgrasses dominate the landscape. Moving further up in elevation, Banana yucca - Yucca baccata, Mojave yucca - Yucca schidigera, and the Joshua Tree - Yucca brevifolia appear more frequently. Small flowering plants also become common. At around 5,000 feet, Utah Juniper -Juniperus osteosperma trees and Single-leaf Pinyon - Pinus monophylla are introduced, and above this elevation they dominate the terrain. Towards the source of the creek, and the head of the canyon Ponderosa Pine - Pinus ponderosa and a wide variety of flowering plants are prevalent. This includes the indigenous Desert Columbine - Aquilegia shockleyi. Riparian plants, such as Fremont Cottonwood - Populus fremontii, flank the creek banks.

== See also ==
- Red Rock Canyon National Conservation Area
- Pinyon-juniper woodland
