= Nevada State Route 372 =

Highway in Nevada

State Route 372
- Charles Brown Highway
- SR 372 highlighted in red

Route information
- Maintained by NDOT
- Length: 7.769 mi (12.503 km)
- Existed: 1976–present

Major junctions
- West end: SR 178 at the California state line near Pahrump
- East end: SR 160 in Pahrump

Location
- Country: United States
- State: Nevada
- County: Nye

Highway system
- Nevada State Highway System; Interstate; US; State; Pre‑1976; Scenic
← SR 362	→ SR 373

State Route 372 (SR 372) is a short state highway in Nye County, Nevada, United States. The route connects the town of Pahrump to the southeast side of Death Valley National Park via California State Route 178. The route was formerly a part of State Route 52 until being renumbered in 1976.

== Route description ==
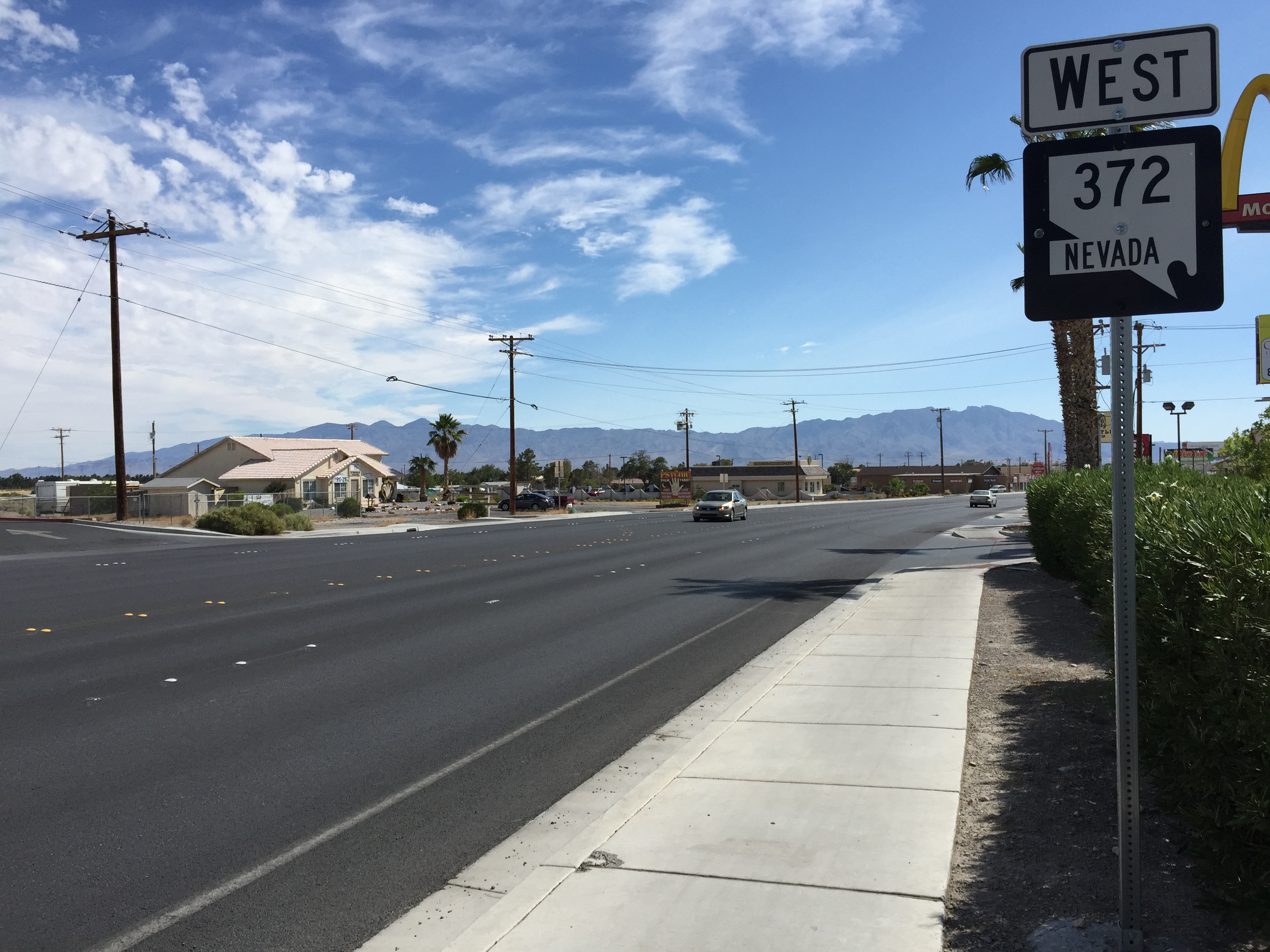
View from the east end of SR 372 looking westbound

State Route 372 begins at the California state line along California State Route 178, about 18 miles (29 km) northwest of the town of Shoshone near the eastern border of Death Valley National Park. From the state line, the route heads northwest where rural areas surrounding Pahrump come into view after a short distance. Development around the route gets more dense as the route continues easterly through the town. SR 372 comes to an end in the middle of Pahrump, at an intersection with State Route 160.

== History ==
Prior to 1976, SR 372 was the western segment of State Route 52.

The road that is now SR 372 was established by 1937. The unimproved route was incorporated into the westernmost end of the State Route 52 alignment, which had been redefined to extend from the California state line, through Pahrump and the Humboldt–Toiyabe National Forest north of Charleston Peak, to State Route 5 southeast of Indian Springs. By 1940, State Route 52 was shown to be discontinuous through the national forest. The portion of SR 52 west of Pahrump had been improved to a gravel road by 1950, and had been constructed to a paved highway by 1956.

The California–to–Pahrump segment of State Route 52 did not undergo any significant changes for several years after being improved in the 1950s. When Nevada began renumbering its state highways in 1976, however, this portion of SR 52 was renumbered to State Route 372. The new route number was first seen on Nevada's official state highway maps in 1978. SR 372 has remained relatively unchanged since.

== Major intersections ==
The entire route is in Nye County.

Location	mi	km	Destinations	Notes
	0.00	0.00	SR 178 west – Shoshone	Western terminus; eastern terminus of SR 178; continuation beyond California state line
Pahrump			Lola Lane	Serves Desert View Hospital
Pahrump	7.769	12.503	SR 160 (Pahrump Valley Road) – Tonopah, Reno, Las Vegas	Eastern terminus; road continues as Crawford Way
1.000 mi = 1.609 km; 1.000 km = 0.621 mi
