= Lavern Cummings =

American actor and singer (1927–2018)

- Born: Paul Lavern Cummings; 17 August 1927; Santa Ana, California, U.S.
- Died: 23 March 2018 (aged 90); Decatur Boulevard, Las Vegas, U.S.
- Other names: Sophisticate of Song
- Occupations: Singer; Actor; Female impersonator
- Years active: 1950 – 2018
- Parent(s): Harry Bell Cummings (father); Grace Stevens (mother)

Paul Lavern Cummings (August 17, 1927 – March 23, 2018), better known by his stage name Lavern Cummings, was an American singer, actor, and female impersonator. Known as the "Sophisticate of Song," Cummings was a major star of the mid-20th-century drag circuit. He was particularly renowned for his "split-voice" ability, performing in a clear soprano before dropping into a rich baritone to surprise audiences. He was a headliner at the famous Finocchio's Club in San Francisco for over 25 years.

== Early life ==
Paul Lavern Cummings was born in Santa Ana, California, on August 17, 1927. His parents, Harry Bell Cummings and Grace Stevens, were strict Protestants. Cummings discovered his vocal range while singing in his high school choir, where he often was conflicted with his teachers who wanted him to sing baritone while he preferred the soprano register.

== Career ==
=== Early years and Jewel Box Revue ===
After high school, Cummings auditioned at the Club Continental, a West Hollywood venue reportedly controlled by Mickey Cohen. In 1950, he moved to Miami to join the Jewel Box Revue, a groundbreaking, racially integrated traveling troupe of female impersonators. He toured with the Revue until 1956, performing in venues across the United States, including New York, Pennsylvania, and Washington.

=== Finocchio's Club ===
In 1956, Cummings joined the cast of Finocchio's Club in San Francisco. He became one of the club's most famous and highest-paid contract performers, staying for 26 years until 1982. Unlike many contemporaries who used wigs, Cummings often styled his own hair for his performances and was noted for his high-fashion gowns and sophisticated stage presence.

=== Acting and later life ===
Cummings appeared as a female impersonator in the 1979 television movie The Golden Gate Murders. After retiring from Finocchio's in 1982, he worked at The Emporium department store in San Francisco before moving to Las Vegas in 1996. In Las Vegas, he continued to work as an actor and extra in various productions.

== Personal life ==
He was raised by strict Protestant parents, Harry Bell Cummings and Grace Stevens. While his parents eventually saw photographs of him in his stage attire, they never saw him perform live.

His social and personal life was closely tied to his colleagues in the entertainment industry; he maintained deep, decades-long friendships with fellow performers such as David de Alba and Holly White. Even in his later years in Las Vegas, he remained active and ambitious, reportedly planning a small-scale stage comeback shortly before his death at age 90.

== Death ==
Cummings died on March 23, 2018, at the age of 90, after being struck by a vehicle in a crosswalk in Charleston Boulevard near Decatur Boulevard in Las Vegas.

== Filmography ==
=== Television ===
Year	Title	Role	Notes
1979	The Golden Gate Murders	Lavern Smith	TV movie

== Legacy ==
His personal archive, the Paul Lavern Cummings Papers, is held at the UNLV University Libraries. The collection includes over nine boxes of photographs, sheet music, and correspondence documenting the history of female impersonation in America.
