= Mountain Springs Summit =

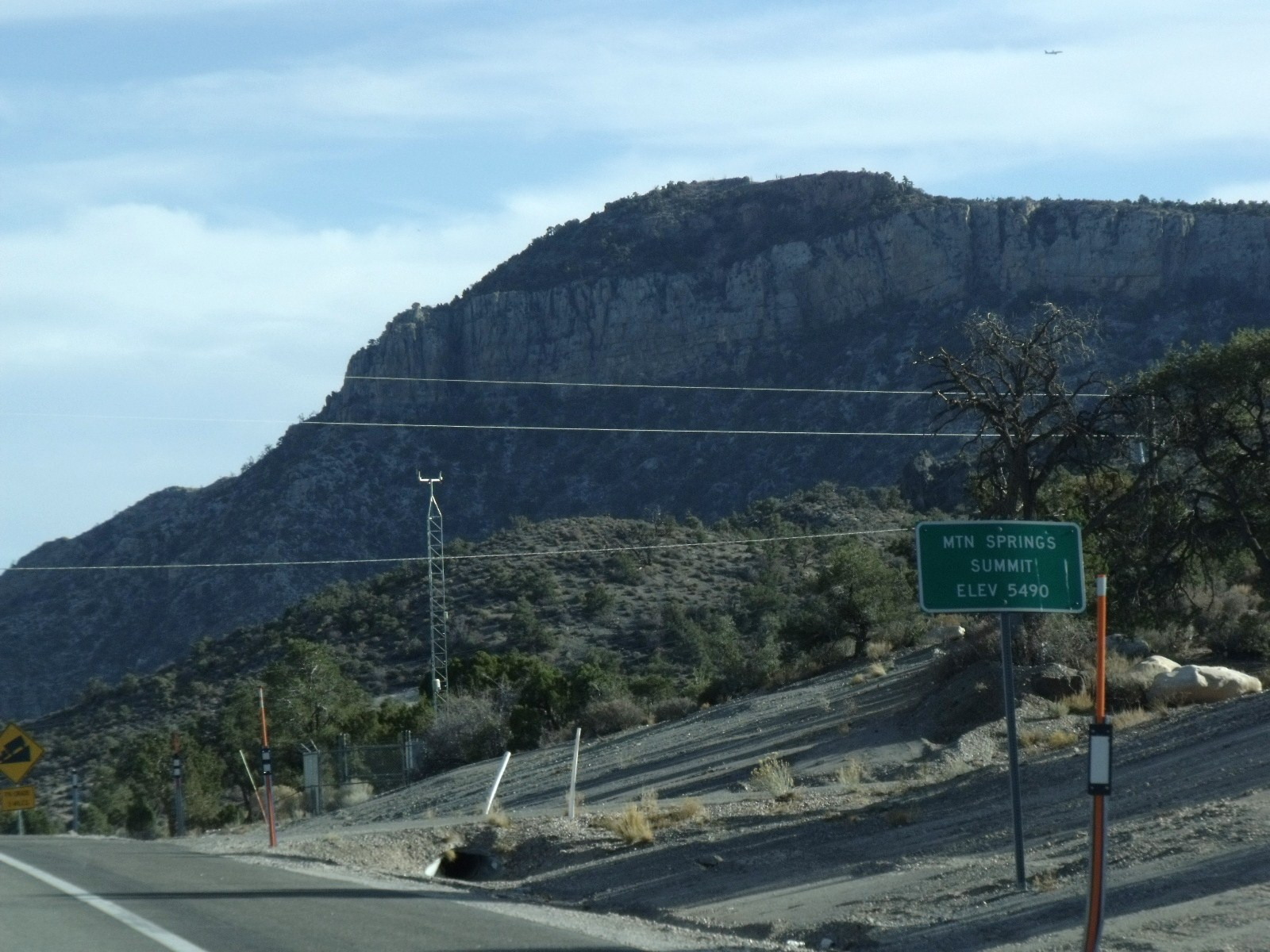
- Interactive map of Mountain Springs Summit
- Elevation: 5,496 ft (1,675 m)GNIS
- Traversed by: SR 160

Third Approach
- Location: Clark County, Nevada
- Range: Spring Mountains
- Coordinates: 36°1′0.89″N 115°30′15.02″WGNIS

Mountain Springs Summit [el. 5,496 ft (1,675 m)] is a mountain pass in the Spring Mountains of Southern Nevada in the United States.

The pass is on the summit of a ridge in the Spring Mountains between the Mount Charleston area and the rest of the Mojave Desert and is located on the border of the Humboldt-Toiyabe National Forest and Red Rock Canyon National Conservation Area. The pass connects the Pahrump Valley with the Las Vegas Valley, and it is traversed by State Route 160.

== History ==
The Old Spanish National Historic Trail went through the pass and along the center-south of Pahrump Valley on a route from southwest Las Vegas.
