= Decatur Boulevard =

Street in Las Vegas, Nevada

- Decatur Boulevard in red

Route information
- Maintained by Clark County, City of Las Vegas and City of North Las Vegas
- Length: 25.0 mi (40.2 km)

Major junctions
- South end: Cactus Avenue and Southern Highlands Parkway in Enterprise
- SR 160 in Enterprise; Future I-215 / CC 215 in Enterprise; SR 592 at Paradise–Spring Valley line; I-11 / US 95 in Las Vegas; US 95 Bus. / SR 599 at Las Vegas–North Las Vegas line; SR 574 at Las Vegas–North Las Vegas line; SR 573 at Las Vegas–North Las Vegas line; Future I-215 / CC 215 at Las Vegas–North Las Vegas line
- North end: Roundabout at the Clark County Shooting Complex at Las Vegas–North Las Vegas line

Decatur Boulevard is a major north–south section line arterial in the Las Vegas metropolitan area located on the west side of the city.

== Route ==
Decatur Boulevard is situated in the west of Las Vegas and runs for roughly 25 miles along a north–south axis. At the southern end, at the junction with West Cactus Avenue, the road becomes Southern Highland Parkway. Interstate 11/U.S. Route 95 delineates the road as South Decatur Boulevard and North Decatur Boulevard. It is crossed twice by the Las Vegas Beltway and provides access to the North Las Vegas Airport. At the northern end, it dead ends at a roundabout at the Clark County Shooting Complex.

Part of the southern section of the Boulevard is known as the location of a number of live music venues. Notable places located along the road include Arizona Charlie's Decatur and an office of the Nevada Department of Motor Vehicles.

South Decatur Boulevard has another section of road in Sloan, along with three other north–south roads, Cameron Street, Arville Street, and Hinson Street, off of Sloan Road acting as an access road to the Sierra Ready Mix South Plant. It is a dead-end road without any outlets.

== History ==
Decatur Boulevard was named after the city of Decatur, Illinois in the 1930s by Leonard Frechette, who lived on the junction of the street and Vegas Drive. The city was itself named in honor of Stephen Decatur, a naval officer during the early 19th century.

A $46 million Clark County construction project that widened much of Decatur Boulevard and introduced a railroad crossing for both Decatur Blvd and Warm Springs Road under the Union Pacific tracks was completed in summer 2010. Sewerage along parts of the route was renewed in spring 2011.

== Major intersections ==
The entire route is in Clark County.

Location	mi	km	Destinations	Notes
Enterprise	0.00	0.00	Southern Highlands Parkway	Continuation beyond southern terminus
Enterprise	0.00	0.00	Cactus Avenue	
Enterprise	2.40	3.86	SR 160 (Blue Diamond Road) – Pahrump	
Enterprise	4.70– 4.90	7.56– 7.89	Future I-215 / CC 215 (Bruce Woodbury Beltway) – Henderson	Interchange; CC 215 exit 13
Paradise–Spring Valley line	7.10	11.43	Tropicana Avenue	Former SR 593
Paradise–Spring Valley line	8.10	13.04	Flamingo Road (SR 592)	
Las Vegas–Spring Valley line	10.1	16.3	Sahara Avenue	Former SR 589
Las Vegas	11.1	17.9	Charleston Boulevard	Former SR 159
Las Vegas	12.0– 12.2	19.3– 19.6	I-11 / US 95 (Purple Heart Highway) – Downtown Las Vegas, Tonopah, Reno	Interchange; I-11/US 95 exit 79
Las Vegas–North Las Vegas line	14.6– 14.9	23.5– 24.0	US 95 Bus. (Rancho Drive, SR 599)	
Las Vegas–North Las Vegas line	15.2	24.5	SR 574 (Cheyenne Avenue)	
Las Vegas–North Las Vegas line	16.7	26.9	SR 573 (Craig Road)	
Las Vegas–North Las Vegas line	19.1– 19.3	30.7– 31.1	Future I-215 / CC 215 (Bruce Woodbury Beltway)	Interchange; CC 215 exit 41
Las Vegas–North Las Vegas line	25.0	40.2	Clark County Shooting Complex	Roundabout; northern terminus
1.000 mi = 1.609 km; 1.000 km = 0.621 mi

== Public transport ==
RTC Transit Route 103 functions on this road.
