= Freeman Junction, California =

Freeman Junction Freeman's Junction (c.1800 - c.1920)
- Ghost town
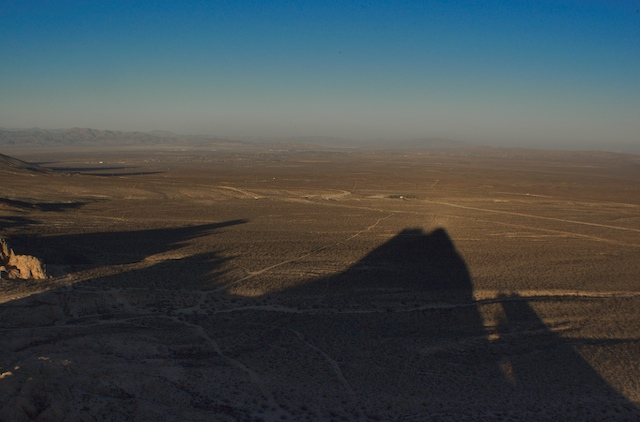
- Overlooking the area where Freeman Junction once stood. The town of Ridgecrest is visible in the background
- Nickname: A Town With Two Pasts
- Location within California
- Coordinates: 35.60166°N 117.90295°W
- Country: United States
- State: California
- County: Kern

California Historical Landmark
- Reference no.: 766

Freeman Junction, a ghost town in Kern County, California, United States, was first homesteaded in the early 1870s. Freeman S. Raymond built a stage coach station here to accommodate travelers between the desert mines and Los Angeles. A group of Native Americans who were defending their homes and families in 1909 killed off the homesteaders and burned the stage station, after which the property lay dormant for several years. It was re-homesteaded in the 1920s by Clare C. Miley, who was born in 1900, and his wife. By the 1930s their small stone cabin became a gas station/car repair and later, a restaurant and some mining activities dominated the site. In 1953 a post office was planned, but never materialized and residents had to travel seven miles to Inyokern to collect their mail. By June, 1978, the town had died once again and the remains of the town have since been removed by passersby. Today, the site has reverted to its natural state and nothing remains.

== History ==
Bedrock mortars near the original spring indicate that this area was regularly used as a camp by Native Americans.

In 1834 explorer Joseph R. Walker passed this junction of Indian trails after crossing the Sierra Nevada via Walker Pass. In the winter of 1849–50, forty-niner parties, en route to the California gold fields, passed through here after escaping Death Valley.

In 1873 or early 1874, Freeman S. Raymond, a member of the original forty-niners, built his stagecoach station here, at the junction of the Walker Pass road (the route of modern California 178) and the road to Los Angeles (now California State Route 14). Both roads carried traffic to and from the mines then in the area. The Walker Pass road led to the Kern River mines, and the Los Angeles road continued further north and east to the mines at Cerro Gordo, the Panamints, and later Darwin and Bodie, California.

On February 25, 1874, Tiburcio Vasquez and his band of outlaws robbed several freight wagon crews at Raymond's station (then called Coyote Holes). They had apparently scouted the location from a nearby rock formation, now known as Robber's Roost. Vasquez's group ambushed and robbed an arriving stagecoach before making their escape. One of the robbery victims was shot in the leg.

Raymond continued operating the stagecoach stop, which after 1889 or 1890 included a post office, until his death in August, 1909. The station burned down a few years later. The Los Angeles Aqueduct now passes through the site.

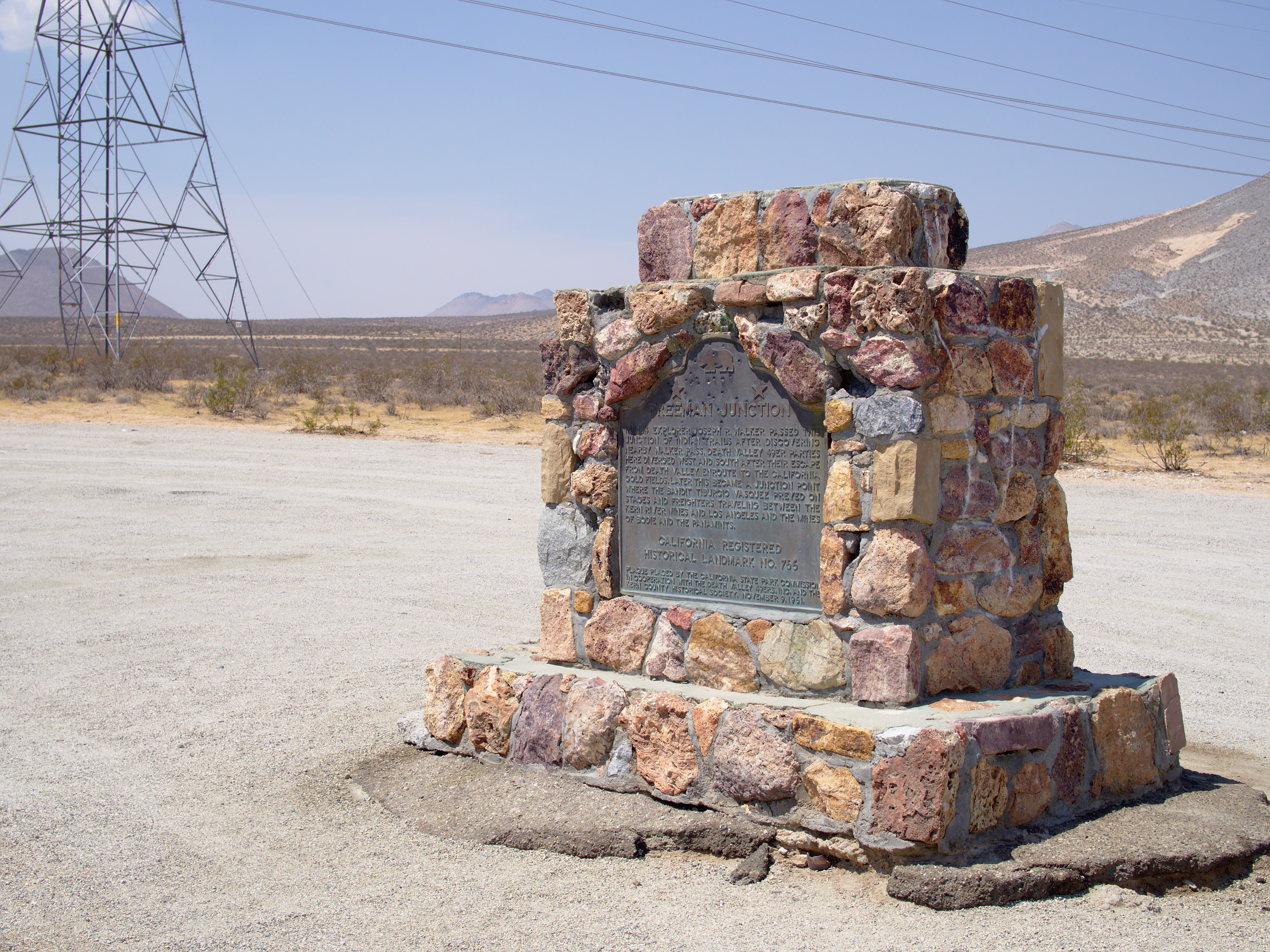
California Historical Landmark monument

California Historical Landmark #766 is located nearby, beside California 178 within sight of the junction with California 14.

California Historical Landmark reads:

NO. 766 FREEMAN JUNCTION - Explorer Joseph R. Walker passed this junction of Indian trails in 1834 after discovering nearby Walker Pass. After their escape from Death Valley, '49er parties split here to go west and south to the California gold fields. Here the bandit Tiburcio Vásquez preyed on stages and freighters traveling between the Kern River mines and Los Angeles and the mines of Bodie and the Panamints.

== See also ==
- List of California Historical Landmarks
- List of ghost towns in California
- California Historical Landmarks in Kern County
- California Historical Landmark

== Bibliography ==
- Edwards, E.I. (1964). Freeman's, a Stage Stop on the Mojave. Glendale, CA: La Siesta Press.
- Mitchell, Roger; Mitchell, Loris (2004). Southern California SUV Trails: Volume I, the Western Mojave Desert. Oakhurst, CA: Track & Trail Publications. ISBN 0-9707115-6-5.
- Palazzo, Robert P. (2009). Darwin, California. Lake Grove, OR: Western Places. ISBN 978-0-943645-37-7.
