= Clark County Shooting Complex =

Shooting ranges in Nevada, United States

Coordinates: 36.352376°N 115.215908°W

The Clark County Shooting Complex, located on the northern outskirts of the Las Vegas–North Las Vegas line in Nevada, is the largest shooting facility in the United States at 2,900 acres (1,200 ha). At full build out is anticipated that only 900 acres (360 ha) will be developed with the rest of the site serving as a buffer for the surrounding community. The park is located at the northern end of Decatur Boulevard at a traffic circle in unincorporated Clark County, just north of the City of Las Vegas boundary.

== History ==
Planning for the park started in 1984. The construction started in January 2008. The first phase on 148 acres (60 ha) is being built at a projected cost of $64 million. The park was dedicated on August 25, 2009, and had a soft opening on December 12, 2009, with limited hours and days of operation. The park fully opened in 2010.

== Facilities ==
- Rifle range
- Skeet shooting
- RV park
- Archery range
- Pistol range

Pistol rentals available. Onsite safety education course required before using range.

- Trap shooting

Shotgun rentals available.

- Sport clay shooting (opened Spring 2013)

Golf cart and shotgun rentals available.
