= Squirrel Mountain Valley, California =

Squirrel Mountain Valley
- census-designated place
- Location in Kern County and the state of California

- Location in the United States
- Coordinates: 35°37′24″N 118°24′35″W
- Country: United States
- State: California
- County: Kern

Government
  - State senator: Shannon Grove (R)
  - Assemblymember: Stan Ellis (R)
  - U. S. rep.: Vince Fong (R)

Area
  - Total: 1.801 sq mi (4.664 km^{2})
  - Land: 1.801 sq mi (4.664 km^{2})
  - Water: 0 sq mi (0 km^{2}) 0%
- Elevation: 2,900 ft (884 m)

Population (2020)
  - Total: 760
  - Density: 420/sq mi (160/km^{2})
- Time zone: UTC-8 (PST)
  - Summer (DST): UTC-7 (PDT)
- ZIP code: 93240
- Area codes: 442/760
- FIPS code: 06-73815
- GNIS feature ID: 1661499

Squirrel Mountain Valley is a census-designated place (CDP) in the southern Sierra Nevadas, in Kern County, California, United States. Squirrel Mountain Valley is located in the Lake Isabella area 5 miles (8 km) northeast of Bodfish, at an elevation of 2,900 feet (883.9 m). The population was 760 at the 2020 census.

== Geography ==
Squirrel Mountain Valley is located at 35°37′24″N 118°24′35″W.

According to the United States Census Bureau, the CDP has a total area of 1.8 square miles (4.7 km^{2}), all of it land. At the 2010 census, the CDP had an total area of 0.7 square miles (1.8 km^{2}), all land.

== Demographics ==
Historical population
Census	Pop.	Note	%±
2000	498		—
2010	547		9.8%
2020	760		38.9%
U.S. Decennial Census; 1860–1870 1880-1890; 1900 1910 1920; 1930 1940 1950; 1960 1970 1980; 1990 2000 2010; 2020

=== Racial and ethnic composition ===
Squirrel Mountain Valley CDP, California – Racial and ethnic composition Note: the US Census treats Hispanic/Latino as an ethnic category. This table excludes Latinos from the racial categories and assigns them to a separate category. Hispanics/Latinos may be of any race.
Race / Ethnicity (NH = Non-Hispanic)	Pop 2000	Pop 2010	Pop 2020	% 2000	% 2010	% 2020
White alone (NH)	445	502	629	89.36%	91.77%	82.76%
Black or African American alone (NH)	1	2	3	0.20%	0.37%	0.39%
Native American or Alaska Native alone (NH)	2	9	28	0.40%	1.65%	3.68%
Asian alone (NH)	0	1	7	0.00%	0.18%	0.92%
Native Hawaiian or Pacific Islander alone (NH)	1	0	0	0.20%	0.00%	0.00%
Other race alone (NH)	4	0	8	0.80%	0.00%	1.05%
Mixed race or Multiracial (NH)	18	11	35	3.61%	2.01%	4.61%
Hispanic or Latino (any race)	27	22	50	5.42%	4.02%	6.58%
Total	498	547	760	100.00%	100.00%	100.00%

=== 2020 census ===
The 2020 United States census reported that Squirrel Mountain Valley had a population of 760. The population density was 422.0 inhabitants per square mile (162.9/km^{2}). The racial makeup of Squirrel Mountain Valley was 652 (85.8%) White, 3 (0.4%) African American, 29 (3.8%) Native American, 7 (0.9%) Asian, 0 (0.0%) Pacific Islander, 18 (2.4%) from other races, and 51 (6.7%) from two or more races. Hispanic or Latino of any race were 50 persons (6.6%).

The whole population lived in households. There were 344 households, out of which 61 (17.7%) had children under the age of 18 living in them, 165 (48.0%) were married-couple households, 34 (9.9%) were cohabiting couple households, 79 (23.0%) had a female householder with no partner present, and 66 (19.2%) had a male householder with no partner present. 101 households (29.4%) were one person, and 75 (21.8%) were one person aged 65 or older. The average household size was 2.21. There were 217 families (63.1% of all households).

The age distribution was 122 people (16.1%) under the age of 18, 29 people (3.8%) aged 18 to 24, 138 people (18.2%) aged 25 to 44, 194 people (25.5%) aged 45 to 64, and 277 people (36.4%) who were 65 years of age or older. The median age was 57.0 years. For every 100 females, there were 95.9 males.

There were 403 housing units at an average density of 223.8 units per square mile (86.4 units/km^{2}), of which 344 (85.4%) were occupied. Of these, 293 (85.2%) were owner-occupied, and 51 (14.8%) were occupied by renters.

=== 2010 ===
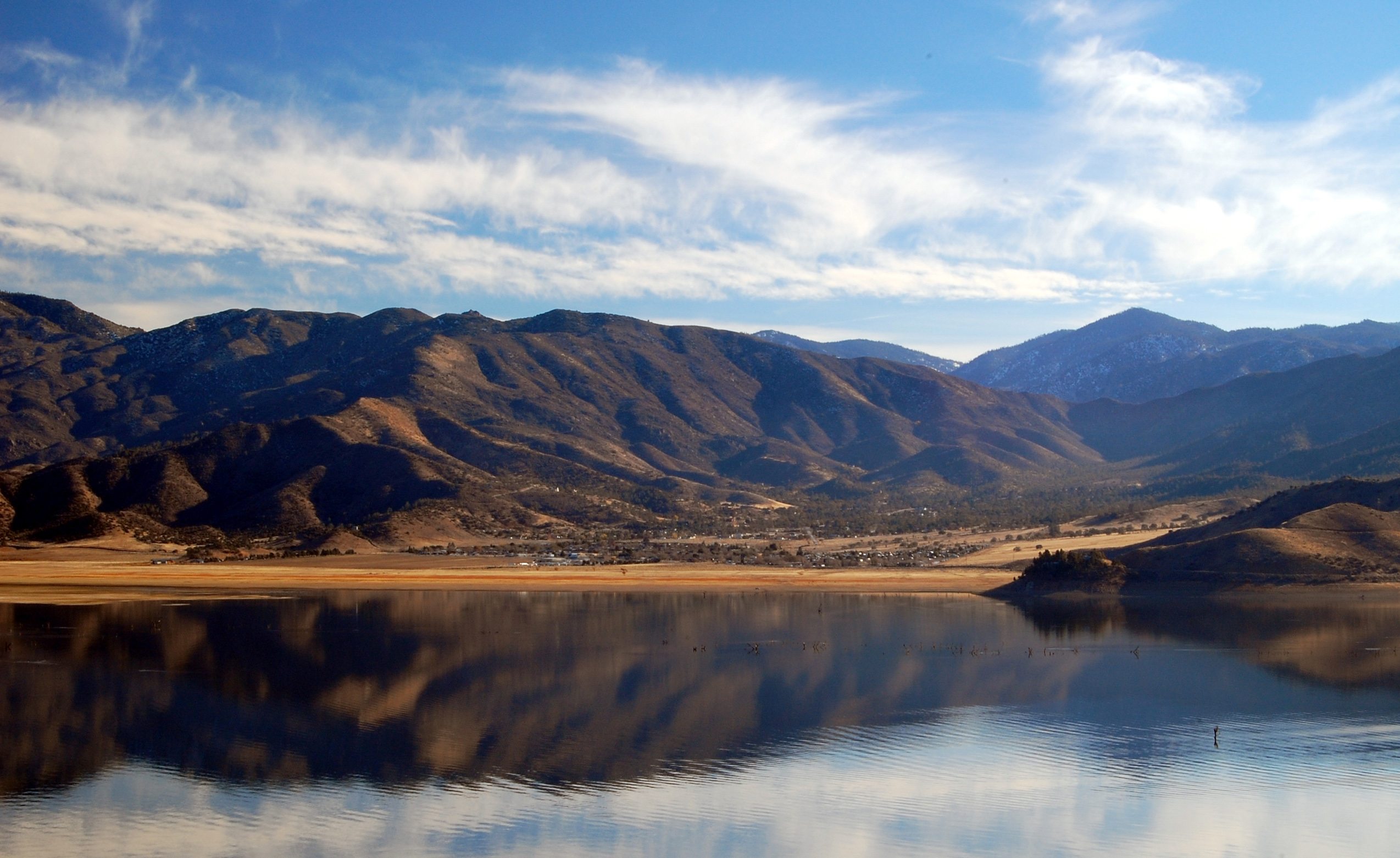
View of the Squirrel Mountain Valley community from the north side of Lake Isabella.

At the 2010 census Squirrel Mountain Valley had a population of 547. The population density was 766.7 inhabitants per square mile (296.0/km^{2}). The racial makeup of Squirrel Mountain Valley was 509 (93.1%) White, 2 (0.4%) African American, 9 (1.6%) Native American, 1 (0.2%) Asian, 0 (0.0%) Pacific Islander, 13 (2.4%) from other races, and 13 (2.4%) from two or more races. Hispanic or Latino of any race were 22 people (4.0%).

The whole population lived in households, no one lived in non-institutionalized group quarters and no one was institutionalized.

There were 255 households, 38 (14.9%) had children under the age of 18 living in them, 162 (63.5%) were opposite-sex married couples living together, 9 (3.5%) had a female householder with no husband present, 13 (5.1%) had a male householder with no wife present. There were 5 (2.0%) unmarried opposite-sex partnerships, and 2 (0.8%) same-sex married couples or partnerships. 63 households (24.7%) were one person and 43 (16.9%) had someone living alone who was 65 or older. The average household size was 2.15. There were 184 families (72.2% of households); the average family size was 2.51.

The age distribution was 68 people (12.4%) under the age of 18, 22 people (4.0%) aged 18 to 24, 58 people (10.6%) aged 25 to 44, 209 people (38.2%) aged 45 to 64, and 190 people (34.7%) who were 65 or older. The median age was 58.3 years. For every 100 females, there were 104.1 males. For every 100 females age 18 and over, there were 99.6 males.

There were 304 housing units at an average density of 426.1 per square mile, of the occupied units 230 (90.2%) were owner-occupied and 25 (9.8%) were rented. The homeowner vacancy rate was 3.4%; the rental vacancy rate was 16.7%. 488 people (89.2% of the population) lived in owner-occupied housing units and 59 people (10.8%) lived in rental housing units.

=== 2000 ===
At the 2000 census, the median household income was $42,083 and the median family income was $52,875. Males had a median income of $62,656 versus $49,000 for females. The per capita income for the CDP was $31,909. None of the families and 2.5% of the population were living below the poverty line, including no under eighteens and 5.8% of those over 64.
