= Nevada State Route 160 =

Highway in Nevada

State Route 160
- Pahrump Valley Highway
- State Route 160, highlighted in red

Route information
- Maintained by NDOT
- Length: 80.297 mi (129.225 km)
- Existed: July 1, 1976–present

Major junctions
- Southeast end: Las Vegas Boulevard in Enterprise
- I-15 in Enterprise; SR 159 in Blue Diamond; SR 372 in Pahrump
- Northwest end: Future I-11 / US 95 north of Pahrump

Location
- Country: United States
- State: Nevada
- Counties: Clark, Nye

Highway system
- Nevada State Highway System; Interstate; US; State; Pre‑1976; Scenic
| ← SR 159 | → SR 161 |

State Route 160 (SR 160) is a state highway in southern Nevada, United States. It connects the southern Las Vegas Valley to U.S. Route 95 (US 95) northwest of the city via the Pahrump Valley. The southern part of the route sees heavy traffic, mostly due to Pahrump's continued growth as a Las Vegas bedroom community.

The route is known as Blue Diamond Road within the Las Vegas area, with the remainder referred to as the Pahrump Valley Highway.

The route was originally part of State Route 16 prior to 1978.

== Route description ==
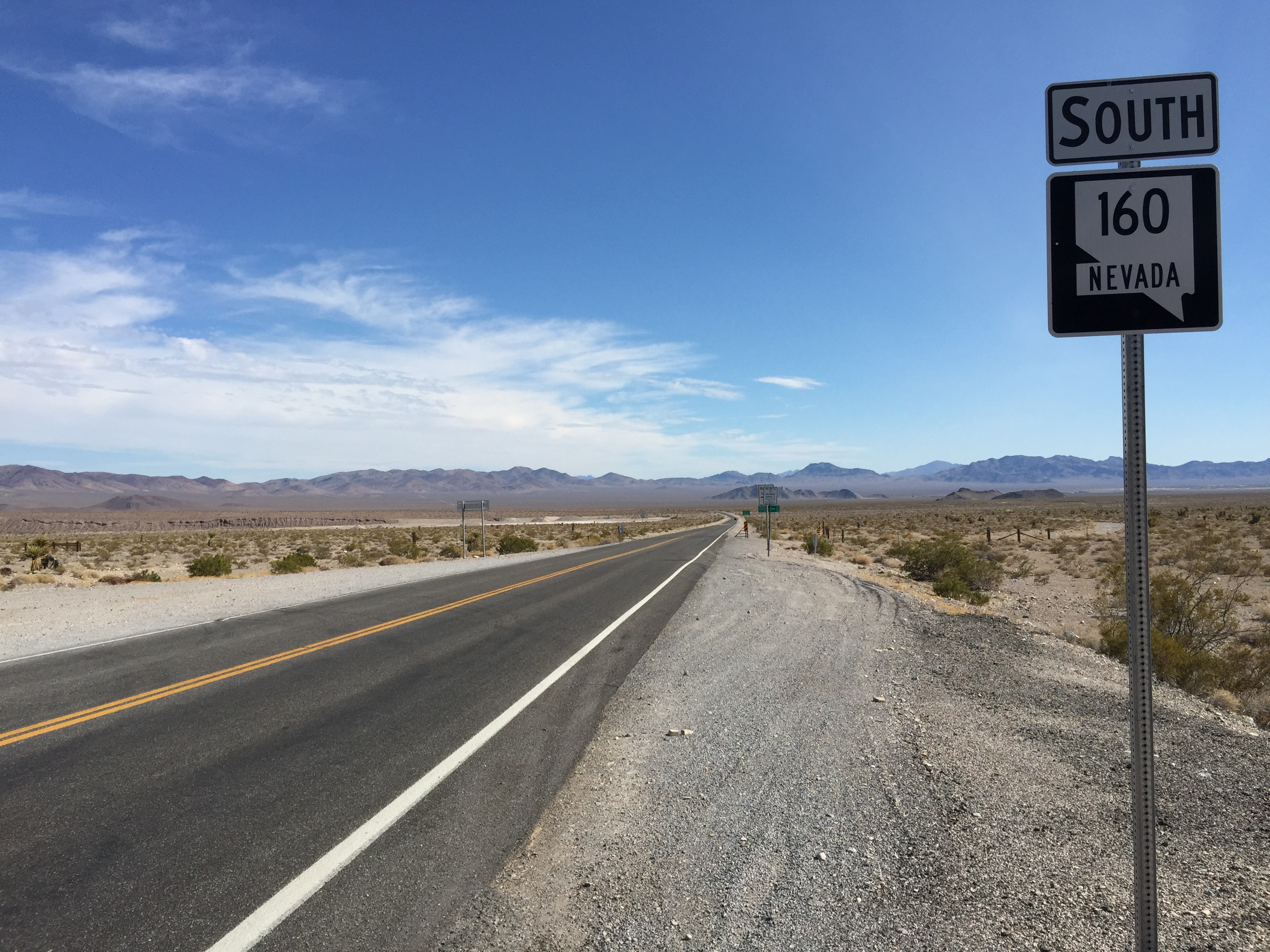
View from the north end of SR 160 looking southbound as seen in 2015

State Route 160 begins in the southern Las Vegas metro area at the intersection of Las Vegas Boulevard (former SR 604) and East Windmill Lane. It runs west-southwest towards the Red Rock Canyon National Conservation Area and over Mountain Springs Summit (elevation 5,502 feet (1,677 m)) before turning northwest towards Pahrump. Outside of Pahrump, SR 160 heads more north-northwest to reach its western terminus at US 95.

== History ==
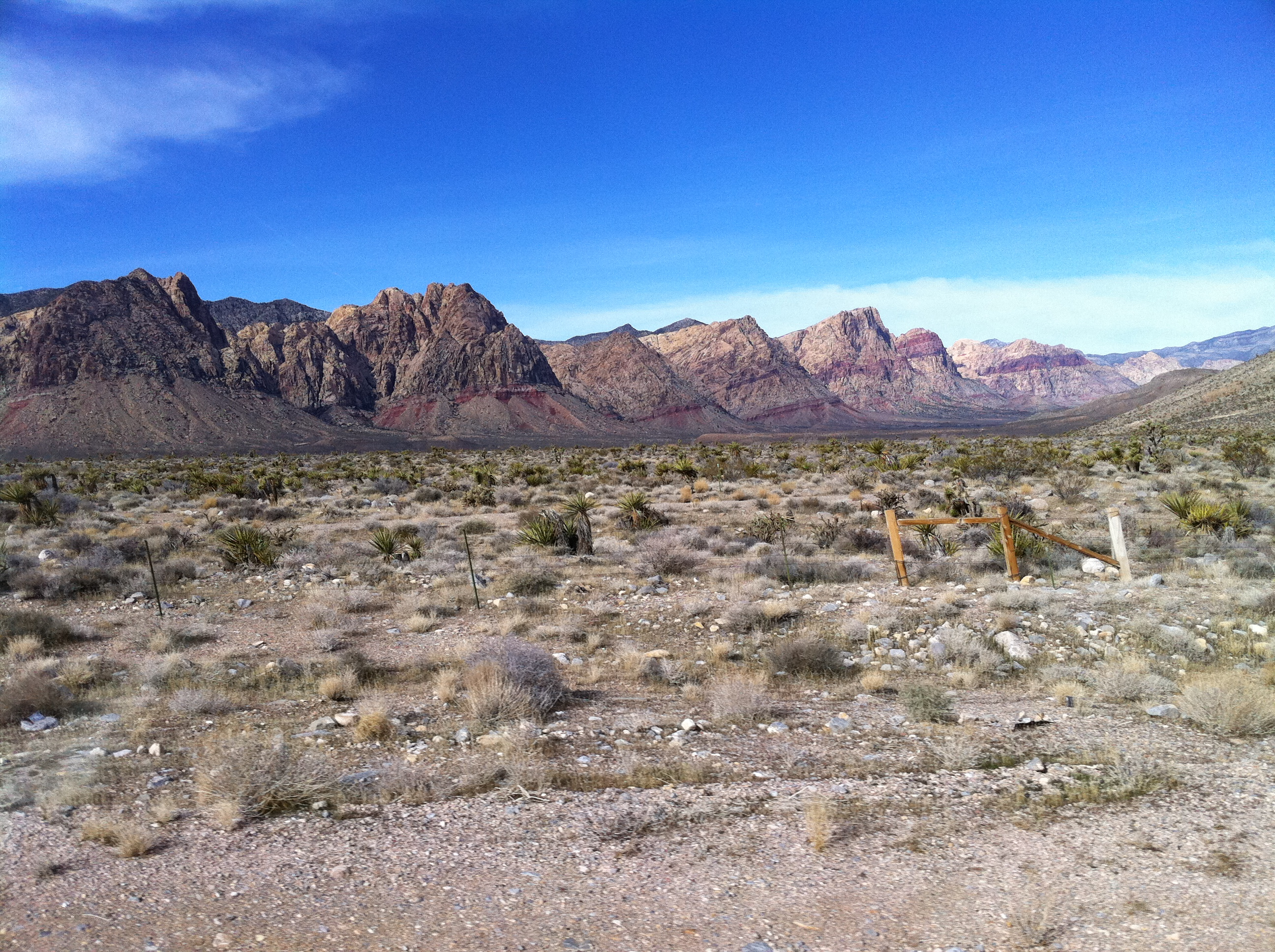
Red Rock Canyon National Conservation Area from SR 160, west of Blue Diamond as seen in 2011

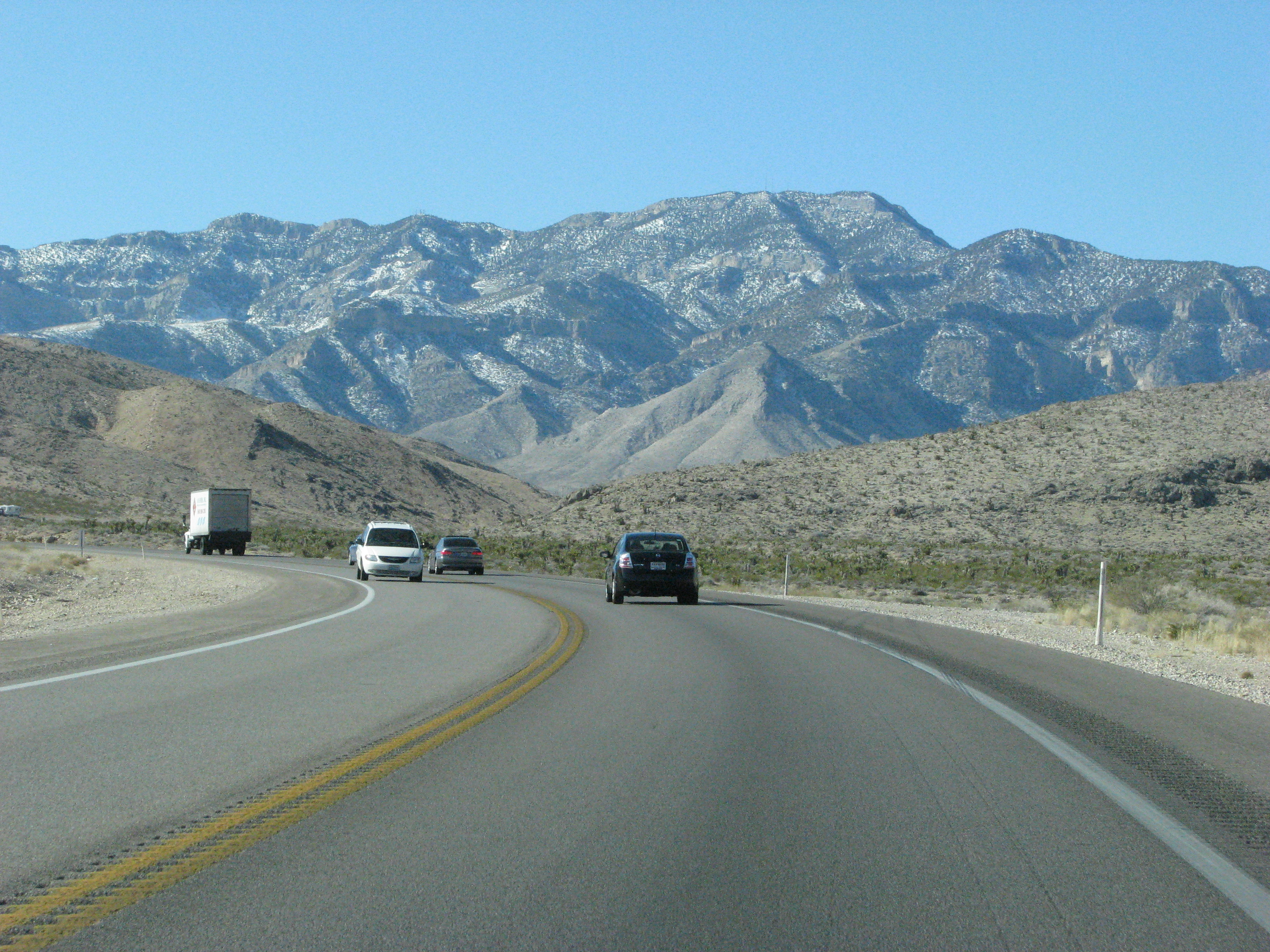
SR 160 westbound between Las Vegas and Mountain Springs as seen in 2008

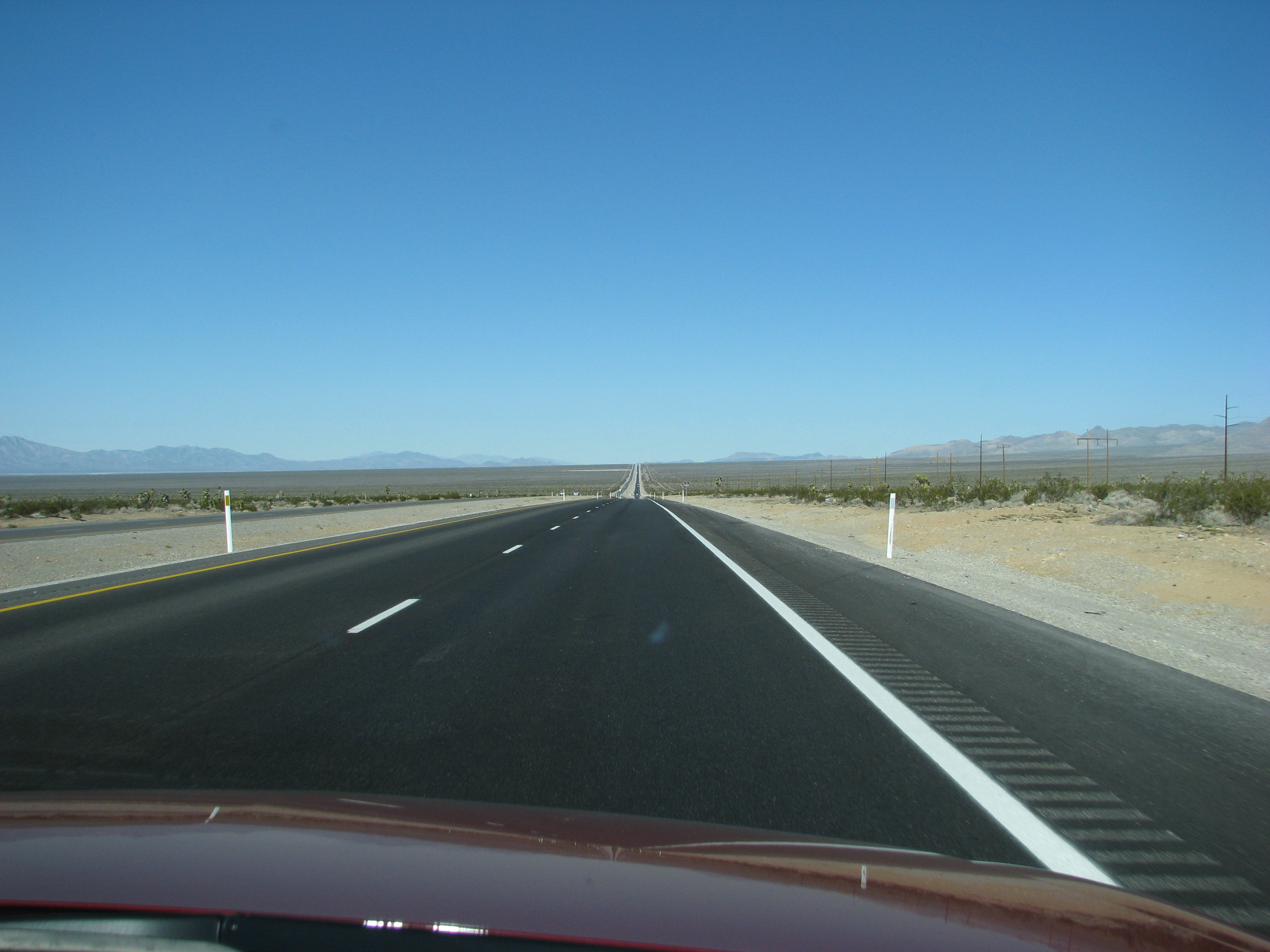
SR 160 westbound as a divided highway between Mountain Springs and Pahrump as seen in 2008

SR 160 was originally part of SR 16 from Pahrump north to US 95. SR 16 was one of Nevada's original state highways dating back to the 1920s. It began at the Nevada–California border in an area of Pahrump Valley near Cathedral Canyon, part of the historic Hidden Hills Ranch south of Pahrump, traveling north to Pahrump over Hidden Hills Ranch Road. From there, it continued north over present-day SR 160 to meet SR 5, which was absorbed into and redesignated US 95 on January 1, 1940.

On July 1, 1976, the section from Pahrump to US 95 was designated as part of the newly created SR 160. The section from the California border to Pahrump remained as SR 16 until it was removed by 1982 and is now designated Old Route 16. However, satellite imagery indicates the former highway remains almost entirely unpaved and even passes through the runway of an old airstrip built in 1941 by Ronald Wiley, former owner of Hidden Hills Ranch and namesake of the Ronald H. Wiley Archaeological Preserve.

In 2007, SR 160 was realigned slightly over I-15 in southern Las Vegas. The highway was moved a short distance to the south between Valley View Boulevard and Las Vegas Boulevard, realigning the southeastern terminus with East Windmill Lane at the intersection of Las Vegas Boulevard. The project also reconstructed the ramps of the aging interchange, allowing for better traffic flow to and from I-15. The unused section of roadway is still visible.

A section of SR 160 between Las Vegas and Pahrump was closed on the weekend of November 4–5, 2017, for the attempt of a world record for the fastest production car. The Koenigsegg Agera RS broke the record at 284.55 miles per hour (457.94 km/h), surpassing the Bugatti Veyron Super Sport. The same section of SR 160 was closed again on October 10, 2020 for another attempt of a world record for fastest production car, this time for the SSC Tuatara. Despite claims that the SSC Tuatara broke the record, the accuracy of this was subsequently challenged by various independent analysts.

== Major intersections ==
Note: Mileposts in Nevada reset at county lines; the start and end mileposts for each county are given in the county column.

| County | Location | mi | km | Destinations | Notes |
|---|---|---|---|---|---|
| Clark; 0.000–43.215 | Enterprise | 0.000 | 0.000 | Windmill Lane | Continuation beyond eastern terminus |
| Clark; 0.000–43.215 | Enterprise | 0.000 | 0.000 | Las Vegas Boulevard | Eastern terminus; former SR 604/US 91/US 466 |
| Clark; 0.000–43.215 | Enterprise | 0.490 | 0.789 | I-15 (Las Vegas Freeway) to I-215 east / CC 215 west – Los Angeles, Salt Lake City | Interchange |
| Clark; 0.000–43.215 | Enterprise | | | Decatur Boulevard | |
| Clark; 0.000–43.215 | Enterprise | 4.333 | 6.973 | Rainbow Boulevard | Former SR 595 north |
| Clark; 0.000–43.215 | Blue Diamond | 11.005 | 17.711 | SR 159 north (Blue Diamond Road) / Erskine Junction Way – Blue Diamond, Red Rock | Southwestern terminus of SR 159; eastern end of Pahrump Valley Highway; western end of Blue Diamond Road |
| Clark; 0.000–43.215 | | 36 | 58 | Tecopa Road / Old Spanish Trail Highway – Tecopa | Former Old Spanish Trail alignment |
| Nye; 0.000–37.012 | Pahrump | 53.036 | 85.353 | SR 372 west (Charles Brown Highway) / Crawford Way – Shoshone, Death Valley | Eastern terminus of SR 372; serves Death Valley National Park |
| Nye; 0.000–37.012 | Pahrump | | | Bell Vista Avenue – Death Valley | To SR 127 / SR 190 west; serves Death Valley National Park |
| Nye; 0.000–37.012 | | 80.297 | 129.225 | Future I-11 / US 95 – Las Vegas, Tonopah, Reno | Proposed interchange; northwestern terminus; northwestern end of Pahrump Valley Highway |
1.000 mi = 1.609 km; 1.000 km = 0.621 mi: Route transition
