= Pahrump Valley =

Valley in Nye County, Nevada

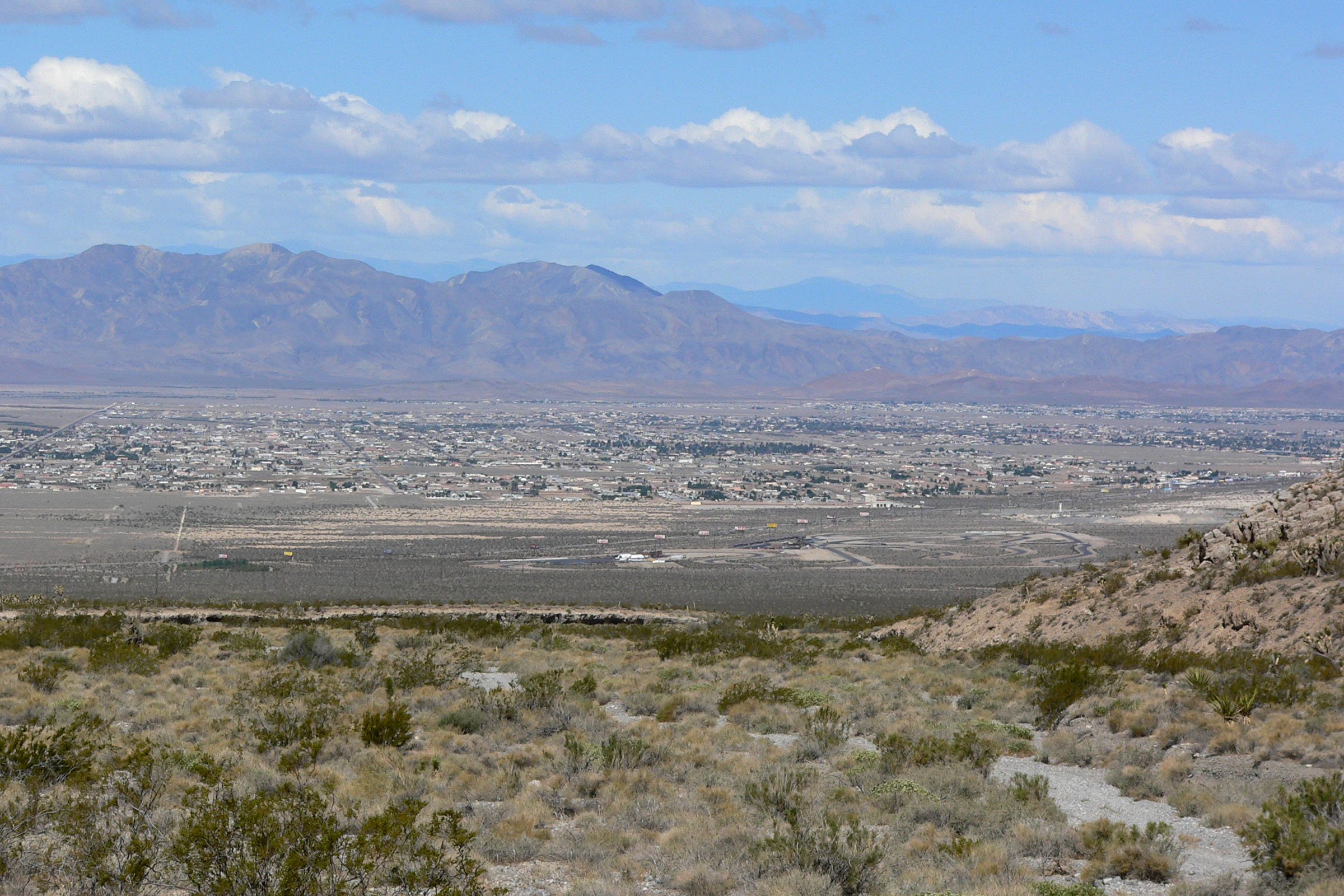
- View due west to north of Nopah and Resting Spring Ranges

- Location within Nevada
- Length: 40 mi (64 km)
- Width: 15 mi (24 km)

Geography
- Country: United States
- State: Nevada, California
- Region: Ivanpah-Pahrump Valleys; Watershed (2830 sq mi)
- District: Nye County, NV & Inyo County, CA
- Population center: Pahrump, Nevada
- Borders on: Spring Mountains-NE; Nopah Range-SW; Resting Spring Range-W & WNW
- Coordinates: 36°12′31″N 116°0′43″W
- Interactive map of Pahrump Valley

Pahrump Valley is a Mojave Desert valley west of Las Vegas and the Spring Mountains massif in southern Nye County, Nevada, and southeastern Inyo County, California. Pahrump, Nevada, is in the valley's center and the Tecopa and Chicago Valleys are immediately to the west. The valley has routes to Death Valley and a route to Las Vegas. Pahrump Valley Days is the annual event in February each year, along with the sanctioned JRH-HS Rodeo.

== History ==
The Pahrump Valley was crossed by the Old Spanish Trail and later the Salt Lake Road.

== Geography ==
The large block of the Spring Mountains borders Pahrump Valley on the northeast and east, with Nevada State Route 160 skirting parts of the mountain's south, and being the only due west route from Las Vegas. Route 160 turns northwest to Pahrump in the valley's center-north then meets U.S. Route 95 at the valley's north perimeter. Carpenter Canyon road starts near Pahrump and runs about 10 miles to Carpenter Canyon. Carpenter Canyon creek is one of the few year round fish creeks in the Spring Mountains.

In California, the Nopah Range borders the valley's southwest, with the north of the adjacent Resting Spring Range merging north to form the northwest border of the Pahrump Valley. The mostly east-west Kingston Range is the southern border of the valley.

The closest community to Pahrump is Shoshone, California, 25 mi southwest, with Ash Meadows Ranch and Death Valley Junction, California slightly farther to the northwest.

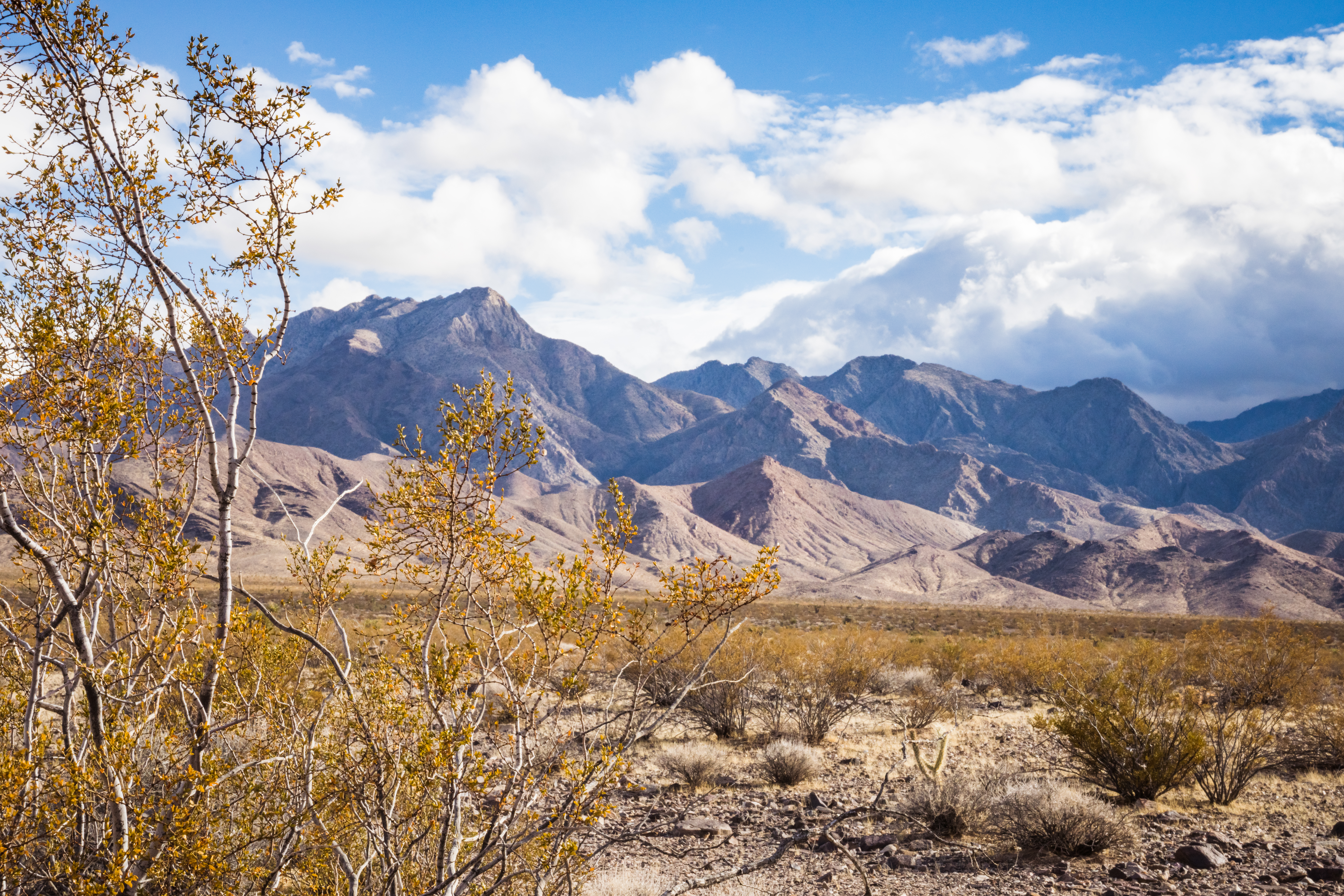
Pahrump Valley Wilderness

=== Pahrump Valley Wilderness ===
The Pahrump Valley Wilderness is in the southern valley, the northern Kingston Range, and the California and Mesquite Valleys.
