= Pahrump, Nevada =

Unincorporated town in Nevada, United States

- Unincorporated town
- Town of Pahrump
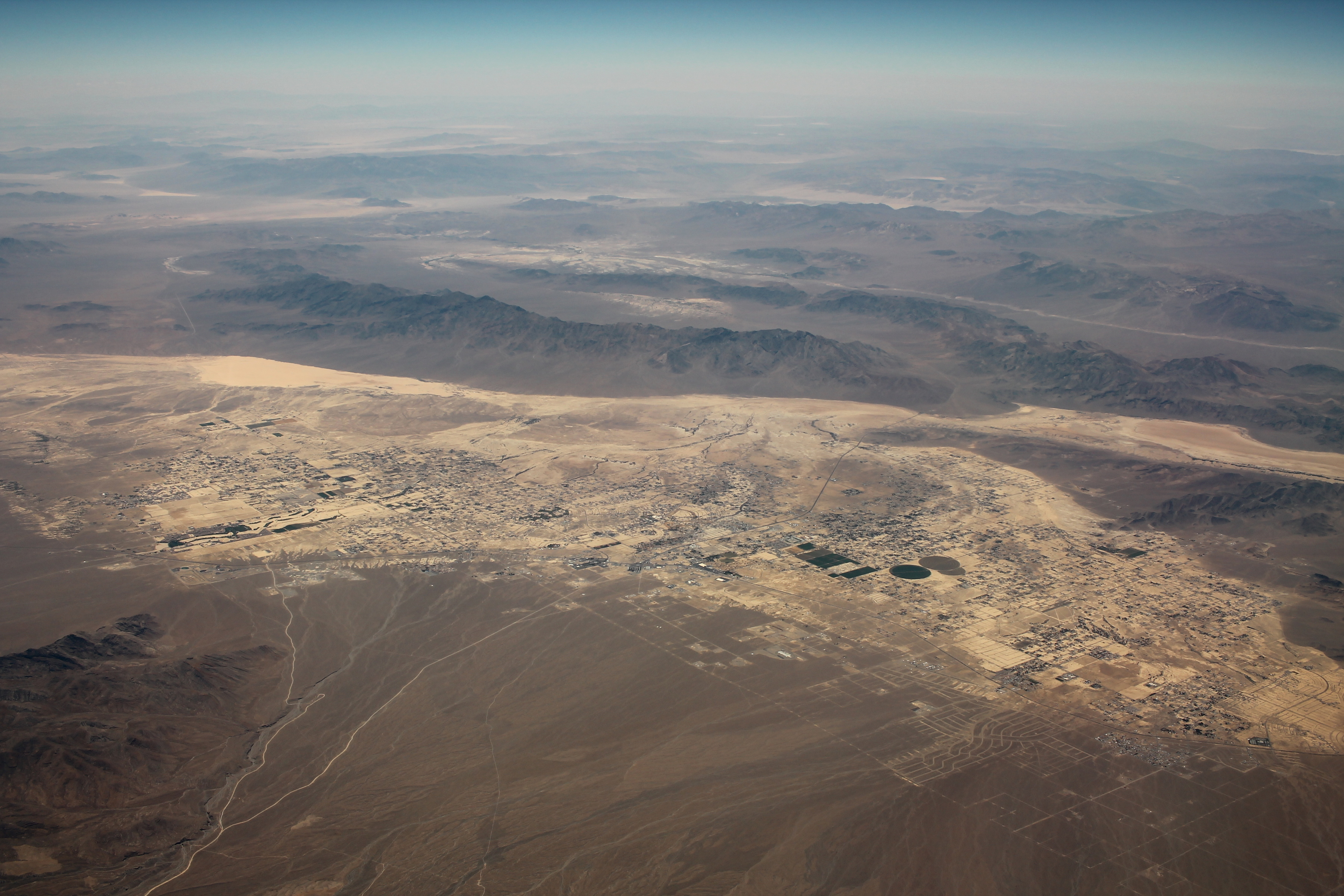
- Aerial view of Pahrump

- Seal
- Motto: "Past and Present Working Towards a New and Better Future"
- Location of Pahrump in Nye County

- Location of Pahrump in Nevada and the US Pahrump (the United States)
- Coordinates: 36°12′31″N 116°0′43″W
- Country: United States
- State: Nevada
- County: Nye

Government
  - Type: County commission
  - Town Manager/County Manager: Timothy Sutton

Area
  - Total: 328.94 sq mi (851.96 km^{2})
  - Land: 328.80 sq mi (851.59 km^{2})
  - Water: 0.14 sq mi (0.37 km^{2})
- Elevation: 2,697 ft (822 m)

Population (2020)
  - Total: 44,738
  - Density: 136.1/sq mi (52.53/km^{2})
- Demonym: Pahrumpian
- Time zone: UTC−8 (Pacific (PST))
  - Summer (DST): UTC−7 (PDT)
- ZIP Codes: 89041, 89048, 89060, 89061
- Area code: 775
- FIPS code: 32-53800
- GNIS feature ID: 0845593
- Website: www.pahrumpnv.org

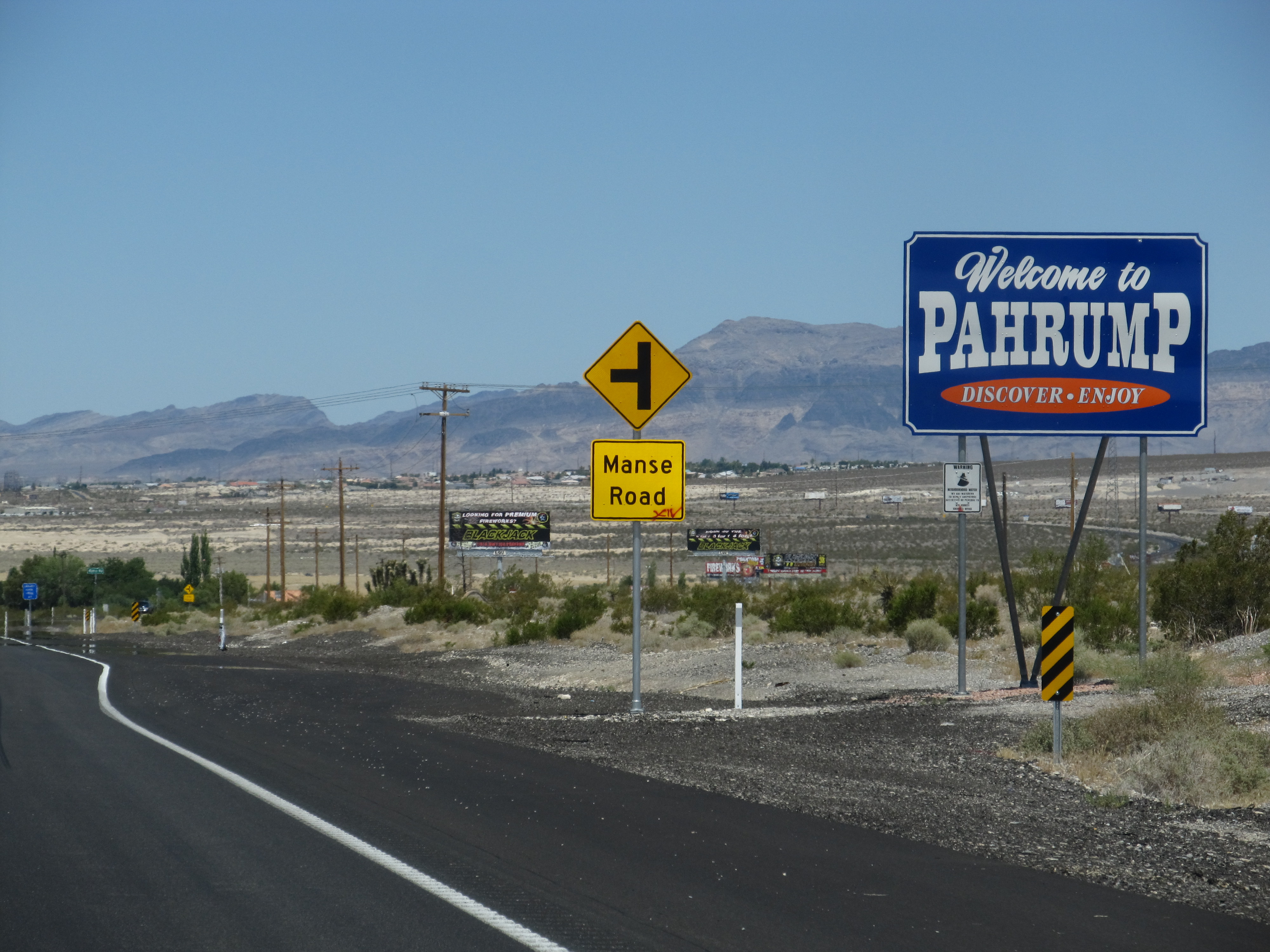
Pahrump welcome sign

Pahrump (/pəˈrʌmp/ pə-RUMP) is an unincorporated town located at the southernmost tip of Nye County, Nevada, United States, about 50 miles (80 km) west of Las Vegas. Pahrump lies adjacent to the Nevada–California border and the area had a population of 44,738 as of the 2020 census.

== History ==
Pahrump was originally inhabited by the Southern Paiute. It was slowly inhabited by settlers in the late 19th century. They reportedly chose the name for Pahrump after the original Southern Paiute name Pah-Rimpi, or "Water Rock," so named because of the abundant artesian wells in the valley. Because of the development of those wells, recent inhabitants of Pahrump Valley established a number of large ranch-style holdings, mostly over 1,000 acres (400 ha) in size. On the ranches, alfalfa and cotton were grown, and livestock were raised.

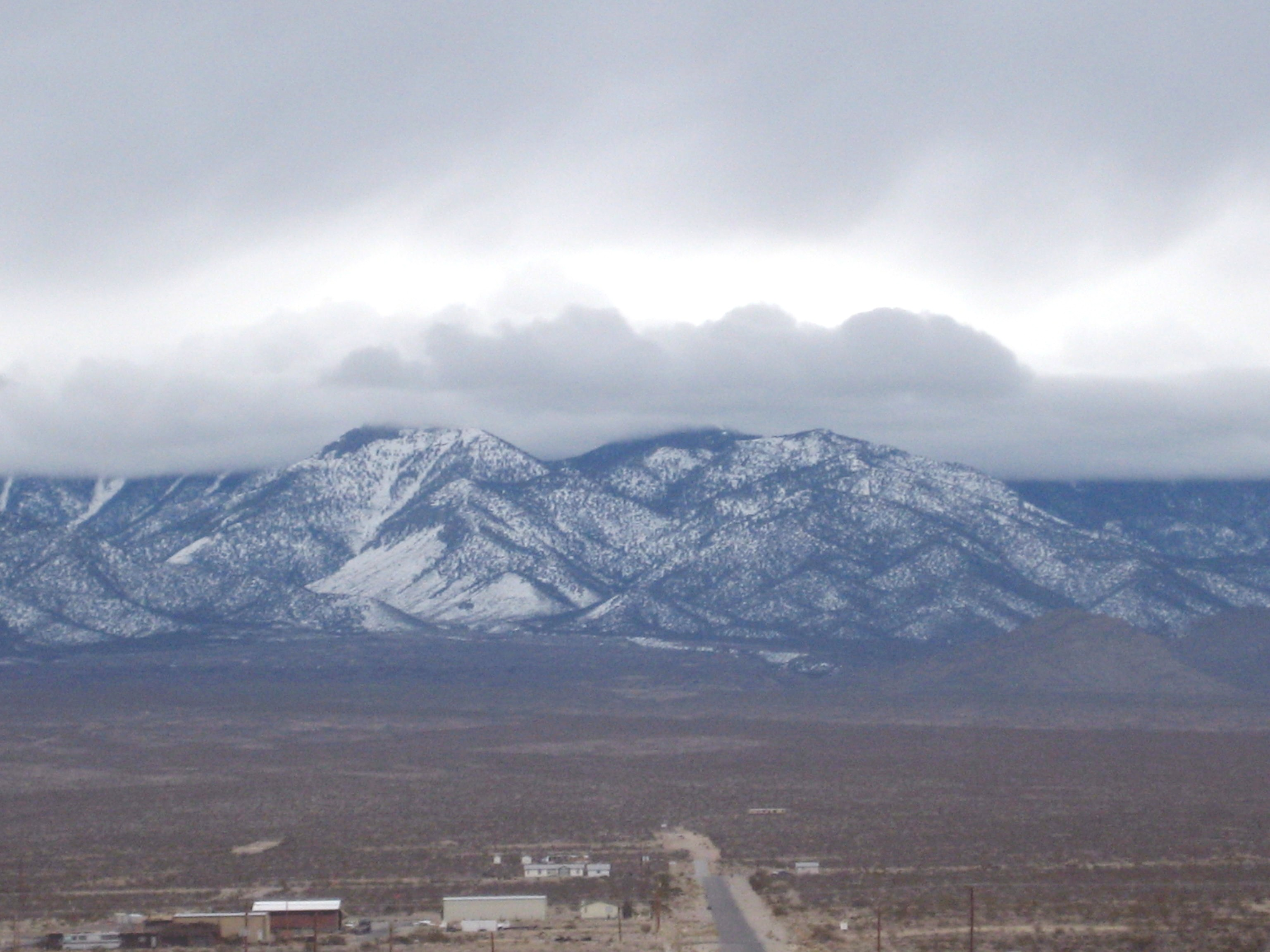
View of the mountains from town

Until the 1960s, Pahrump had no telephone service except a radio transmitter phone in a phone booth next to the small market, and no paved roads accessed the Pahrump Valley. As Las Vegas grew, the Pahrump region also saw more real estate development and population growth. This led to the introduction of telephone service and the construction of a paved highway between Las Vegas and Pahrump during the late 1960s. Later, this road (NV 160) was extended from Pahrump northward to US 95, near Amargosa Valley. A second paved road (NV 372) was introduced that connected Pahrump to neighboring Shoshone, California, which provided a link to the Death Valley area, as well as a shorter route to Los Angeles, California. In the fifties and sixties, there was a two-room elementary school. High school students commuted to Shoshone. In 1974, Pahrump's first high school, Pahrump Valley High School, was constructed.

Pahrump is an archetypal example of an exurb (a residential region beyond suburbs). Due to the necessity of conservation, almost all significant agriculture ended in the valley, and over the years the surface aquifers have been drained. Residential housing growth in Pahrump was partly responsible for Nye County ranking among the fastest growing counties nationwide in 2005.

Las Vegas casino owner Ted Binion buried a large quantity of silver in a secret underground vault in Pahrump. In 1998, Binion died under suspicious circumstances, and one of those accused of murdering Binion was apprehended while digging up the vault in Pahrump. A book about the Binion murder trial (and Las Vegas poker) is Positively Fifth Street by James McManus.

On November 15, 2006, the Pahrump town board voted for an ordinance declaring English the official language of business, limiting the display of foreign flags, and denying housing assistance or other welfare benefits to illegal immigrants. A measure in the ordinance required an American flag to be displayed above any other flag, regardless of what organization, nation, or government it represented. Then-county Sheriff Tony DeMeo said he would not attempt to enforce the ordinance, which was repealed four months later following negative publicity.

== Geography and climate ==
According to the United States Census Bureau, the census-designated place of Pahrump has a total area of 297.9 sq mi (771.5 km^{2}), all of which is land. By area, it is the largest CDP in the contiguous United States, although it ranks only eleventh nationally, since the largest ten are all in Alaska. The area lies in the Mojave Desert.

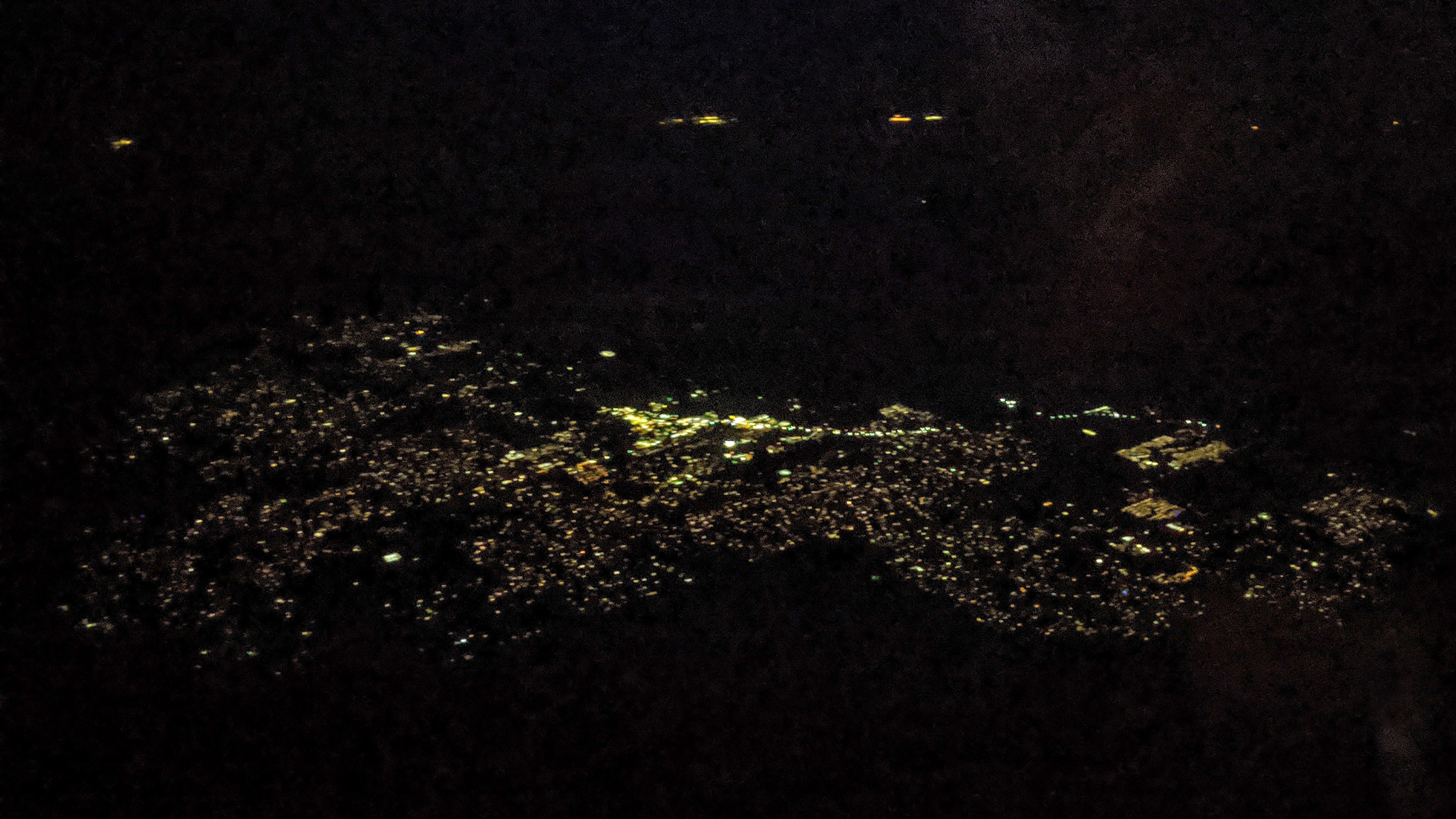
Night aerial view of Pahrump from the southwest, with the downtown intersection of Nevada routes 160 and 372 at the bright center

Summers in Pahrump are generally very hot and dry, with occasional pushes of monsoonal moisture beginning in early July. Being at a similar elevation to Las Vegas, daytime highs in summer average within a few degrees lower than that of Las Vegas. Record highs are similar between the two cities as well. A typical day during June through August brings temperatures around 100 °F (38 °C), and occasionally 110 °F (43 °C). Nighttime temperatures, however, are noticeably cooler.

This is due to the lack of an urban heat island in Pahrump, allowing for intense radiative cooling after sundown. As a result, summer nights are pleasantly warm, bottoming out in the mid-60s or 70s °F (around 20 °C). Pahrump's location in a valley leads to large diurnal temperature ranges, typically 30 °F (17 °C) but occasionally 40 °F (22 °C).

By late August and early September, the sweltering summer heat noticeably tempers down. September is the gateway to fall, which brings very pleasant weather. October highs are generally 80 °F (27 °C) and nighttime temperatures in the 50s °F (low teens °C). Due to its elevation, Pahrump is protected from the searing summer temperatures experienced in the nearby Death Valley.

Like other locations in the Mojave desert, winters are typically mild, with occasional pushes of cold air from the north. Daytime highs average from the mid-50s and 60s °F (10s °C), but low temperatures hover around freezing for most nights during the wintertime. Spring brings pleasantly warm temperatures and cool evenings. Like other locations in the Mojave desert, this is the windiest time of year. Snowfall is rare in Pahrump, but there is generally one snow day per year, or at least one every two years.

Climate data for Pahrump, Nevada (1991–2020 normals, extremes 1914–1926, 1949–1952, 1958–present)
Month	Jan	Feb	Mar	Apr	May	Jun	Jul	Aug	Sep	Oct	Nov	Dec	Year
Record high °F (°C)	79 (26)	86 (30)	91 (33)	98 (37)	107 (42)	115 (46)	117 (47)	115 (46)	111 (44)	103 (39)	88 (31)	77 (25)	117 (47)
Mean maximum °F (°C)	69.5 (20.8)	73.8 (23.2)	81.4 (27.4)	90.7 (32.6)	98.0 (36.7)	106.0 (41.1)	109.8 (43.2)	107.5 (41.9)	102.8 (39.3)	93.6 (34.2)	80.5 (26.9)	68.0 (20.0)	110.6 (43.7)
Mean daily maximum °F (°C)	58.0 (14.4)	61.8 (16.6)	68.7 (20.4)	75.9 (24.4)	84.9 (29.4)	95.3 (35.2)	101.3 (38.5)	100.0 (37.8)	93.1 (33.9)	80.8 (27.1)	67.3 (19.6)	56.7 (13.7)	78.6 (25.9)
Daily mean °F (°C)	42.9 (6.1)	46.8 (8.2)	53.5 (11.9)	60.0 (15.6)	68.9 (20.5)	78.0 (25.6)	84.6 (29.2)	82.8 (28.2)	75.2 (24.0)	62.8 (17.1)	50.4 (10.2)	41.8 (5.4)	62.3 (16.8)
Mean daily minimum °F (°C)	27.8 (−2.3)	31.8 (−0.1)	38.3 (3.5)	44.1 (6.7)	52.9 (11.6)	60.8 (16.0)	67.9 (19.9)	65.6 (18.7)	57.3 (14.1)	44.8 (7.1)	33.5 (0.8)	26.9 (−2.8)	46.0 (7.8)
Mean minimum °F (°C)	18.7 (−7.4)	22.3 (−5.4)	27.7 (−2.4)	33.5 (0.8)	41.4 (5.2)	49.6 (9.8)	59.4 (15.2)	57.1 (13.9)	47.4 (8.6)	34.4 (1.3)	22.4 (−5.3)	17.1 (−8.3)	15.4 (−9.2)
Record low °F (°C)	4 (−16)	6 (−14)	15 (−9)	18 (−8)	22 (−6)	34 (1)	46 (8)	42 (6)	34 (1)	15 (−9)	7 (−14)	−2 (−19)	−2 (−19)
Average precipitation inches (mm)	0.71 (18)	0.91 (23)	0.60 (15)	0.30 (7.6)	0.17 (4.3)	0.08 (2.0)	0.36 (9.1)	0.20 (5.1)	0.37 (9.4)	0.38 (9.7)	0.23 (5.8)	0.66 (17)	4.97 (126)
Average precipitation days (≥ 0.01 in)	3.6	4.0	3.3	2.2	1.4	0.5	2.0	1.6	1.4	1.6	1.5	3.0	26.1
Source: NOAA

== Demographics ==
Historical population
Census	Pop.	Note	%±
1990	7,424		—
2000	24,631		231.8%
2010	36,441		47.9%
2020	44,738		22.8%
U.S. Decennial Census

As of the census of 2000, there were 24,631 people, 10,153 households. As of the 2020 census, the population was 44,738. Estimates from the U.S. Census Bureau placed the population at 57,336 in 2025 with 7,127 families residing in the census-designated place (CDP) of Pahrump. The population density was 82.7 inhabitants per square mile (31.9/km^{2}). There were 11,651 housing units at an average density of 39.1 per square mile (15.1/km^{2}). The racial makeup of the CDP was 96.1% White, 0.1% African American, 1.1% Native American, 1.4% Asian, 0.37% Pacific Islander, 2.27% from other races, and 2.6% from two or more races. Hispanic or Latino of any race were 12.9% of the population.

There were 10,153 households, out of which 14.2% had children under the age of 18 living with them, 58.2% were married couples living together, 7.5% had a female householder with no husband present, and 29.8% were non-families. 23.5% of all households were made up of individuals, and 10.5% had someone living alone who was 65 years of age or older. The average household size was 2.42 and the average family size was 2.83.

In the CDP, the population was spread out, with 22.3% under the age of 18, 4.9% from 18 to 24, 10.6% from 25 to 44, 28.9% from 45 to 64, and 55.3% who were 65 years of age or older. The median age was 45 years. For every 100 females, there were 102.4 males. For every 100 females age 18 and over, there were 101.4 males.

The median income for a household in the CDP was $34,860, and the median income for a family was $39,812. Males had a median income of $35,862 versus $21,586 for females. The per capita income for the CDP was $17,708. About 7.3% of families and 10.7% of the population were below the poverty line, including 14.8% of those under age 18 and 7.0% of those age 65 or over. An unusually large percentage (29) of Nye County resident's income is from federal benefits, which amounts to $9,408 for each resident of the county.

== Government ==
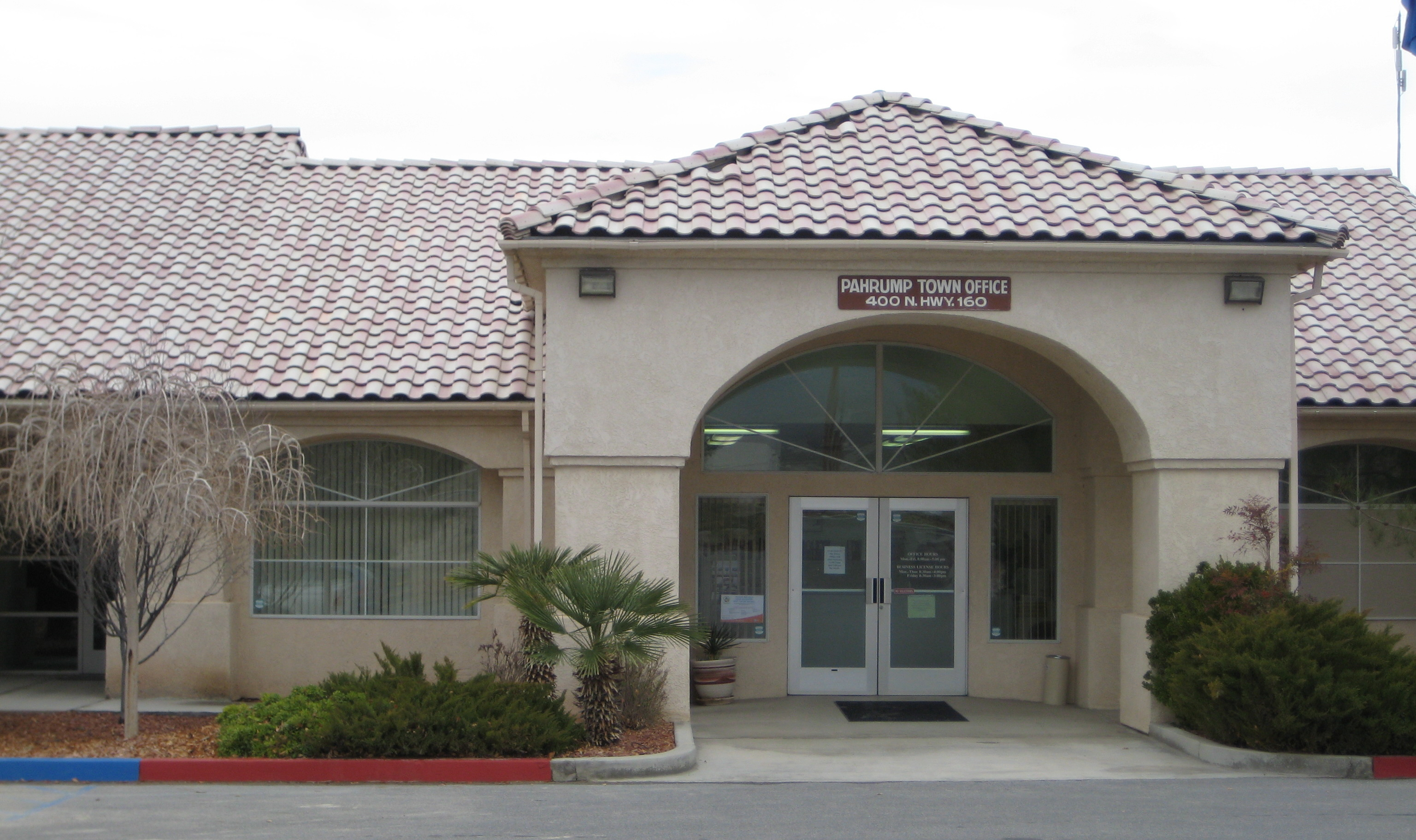
Government offices for Pahrump

Pahrump has an unincorporated town status, with a limited government that manages land-use planning, recreation, and fire, while leaving most services to Nye County. In 2012, Pahrump voted to disband the Town Board form of government in favor of an advisory board under the County Commissioners. It was finalized in 2014 when the incumbent elected members' terms expired. The Town Board was disbanded as of January 2015.

Gregory Hafen II (R) represents the 36th district in the Nevada Assembly.

== Education ==
Public education in Pahrump is administered by the Nye County School District. The district headquarters is in Pahrump.

Pahrump has a public library.

The county is in the service area of Great Basin College.

== Economy ==
Notable businesses in the area include the Spring Mountain Motor Sports Ranch. Golden Entertainment operates three casinos in Pahrump.

Two legal brothels, Sheri's Ranch and Chicken Ranch, are located on the outskirts of Pahrump. Due to their proximity to Las Vegas, they tend to be more expensive than other legal brothels in Nevada.

== Media ==
Pahrump is served by Prime-TV affiliate KPVM-TV 25 It has ten digital channels 25.1 (PrimeTV), 25.2 (thisTV, 25.3 America's Voice, 25.4 OANN, 25.5 Shop LC, 25.6 Home Shopping Network, 25.7 conservative talk radio, 25.8 country, 25.9 Nuestra Vision, and 25.10 Fun Roads. Pahrump is also home to KACP 103.1 FM which airs a country music format.

== Transportation ==
Pahrump Valley Transportation is the only public transportation in Pahrump. However, there is also VetRANS, a transportation service for veterans. Both services run by appointment, and offer transport to certain destinations in Las Vegas. Pahrump has taxi service operating 24 hours a day. Salt Lake Express serves Pahrump on its bus route from Las Vegas to Reno. Eastern Sierra Transit Authority provides bus service from Pahrump to Tecopa, California.

Residents, and those visiting Pahrump, utilize Harry Reid International Airport in the Las Vegas area, approximately 60 miles east of Pahrump. A private airport, Calvada Meadows Airport, also serves Pahrump, however, aircraft must request permission before landing at this small airport.

== Notable residents ==
Pahrump was the hometown of author and radio personality Art Bell. He was known for founding Coast to Coast AM, an overnight radio talk show mainly about paranormal subjects, conspiracies, and other oddities that he broadcast from his home studio.

Michael Jackson purchased a home in the area in 2008, where he briefly had a home studio and home schooled his three children.

Pahrump is the home of Ronald Wayne, the third co-founder of Apple Computer along with Steve Jobs and Steve Wozniak. Wayne relinquished his equity in Apple for $800 in 1976; he now lives a quiet lifestyle in Pahrump, selling stamps and rare coins.

Retired actress June Kenney lived in Pahrump from 2010 to her death in 2021.

Musical group Escape the Fate was founded in, and originally from, Pahrump, before the band relocated to Las Vegas.

Infamous "Hollywood madam" Heidi Fleiss moved to Pahrump in 2005.

Melvin Dummar, who claimed to have saved the life of Howard Hughes and who was named in a disputed will as Hughes's main beneficiary, lived for a while in Pahrump and died there in 2018. Dummar was the subject of the film Melvin and Howard, starring Mary Steenburgen.

1992 Libertarian Vice Presidential candidate Nancy Lord lived in Pahrump for a number of years.

Although brothel owner Dennis Hof died in nearby Crystal, he referred to himself in political ads as "The Trump of Pahrump," a sobriquet he credited to Donald Trump advisor Roger Stone (an early supporter of Hof).

Libertarian writer and filmmaker J. Neil Schulman, author of Alongside Night (1978) and writer/producer/director of the indie film Alongside Night, lived in Pahrump. Schulman was the first to produce a film that featured Pahrump, in the script of Lady Magdalene's, which starred Nichelle Nichols as the owner of the title brothel.

== In popular culture ==
- In the film Mars Attacks!, Martians land in Pahrump and announce they have "come in peace", but soon kill most of the humans gathered there.
- Pahrump was featured in Studio 60 on the Sunset Strip in a two-part episode titled "Nevada Day." Part One aired November 6, 2006, and Part Two aired a week later on November 13. The scenes, however, were set only in the town jail and a small diner across the street, and the town itself was not featured, implying that Pahrump is much smaller than it actually is.
- The TV series Get Shorty is partly set in Pahrump. The city is the home town of main character Miles Daly, played by Chris O'Dowd.
- The TV series Small Town News: KPVM Pahrump is about the only TV station in Pahrump.
- Pahrump was featured in seasons 2, 3, and 4 of the TV series Live PD produced by A&E.
- In Harvey Birdman: Attorney General, Peter Potamus runs a radio show, HippoWars, on KHPO broadcasting out of Pahrump.
- Pahrump was briefly referenced in season 5 of iZombie.
- The infamous low-budget Ray Dennis Steckler film Blood Shack was filmed in Pahrump.

== See also ==
- Carpenter Canyon Road leads from Pahrump to Carpenter Canyon and Carpenter Canyon Creek
