= Shoshone, California =

Shoshone
- Unincorporated Community; Census Designated Place
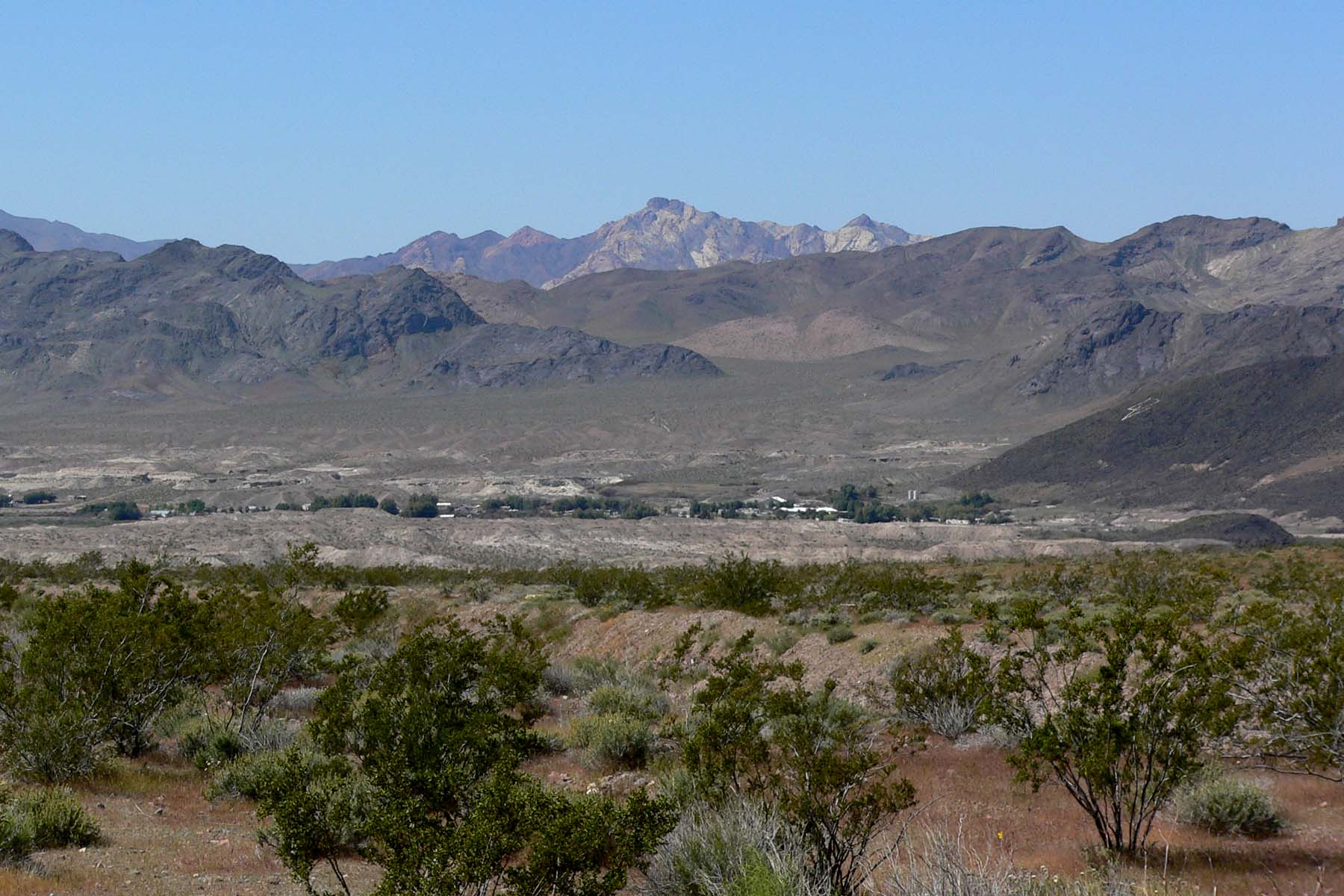
- View of Shoshone from the east

- Location in Inyo County and the state of California

- Location in the United States
- Coordinates: 35°58′23″N 116°16′16″W
- Country: United States
- State: California
- County: Inyo
- Established: 1910

Area
  - Total: 28.71 sq mi (74.36 km^{2})
  - Land: 28.71 sq mi (74.36 km^{2})
  - Water: 0 sq mi (0 km^{2}) 0%
- Elevation: 1,585 ft (483 m)

Population (April 1, 2020)
  - Total: 22
  - Density: 0.77/sq mi (0.30/km^{2})
- Time zone: UTC-8 (Pacific)
  - Summer (DST): UTC-7 (PDT)
- ZIP code: 92384
- Area codes: 442/760
- FIPS code: 06-71680
- GNIS feature ID: 2408733

Shoshone is a census-designated place (CDP) in Inyo County, California, United States. The population was 22 at the 2020 census, down from 31 at the 2010 census.

The town was founded in 1910. Its name may refer to the Shoshone people. Although small, it is notable as a southern gateway to Death Valley National Park; in addition to being a junction of roads leading from Baker, California and Pahrump, Nevada, it has the last services available before the Furnace Creek area in the park. The commercial district of the town, including a post office, gas station, restaurant, bar and coffee house, is just north of the southern intersection of California State Routes 127 and 178.

Shoshone has a single 2,380-foot (730 m) airstrip across SR 127 from the commercial district. It is open to the public and gets about 58 flights per month.

Shoshone, California, has a history as a railroad town and rich mining district.

== Geography ==
According to the United States Census Bureau, the CDP has a total area of 28.7 square miles (74 km^{2}), over 99% of which is land. It is 14 miles (23 km) east of Epaulet Peak, at an elevation of 1,585 feet (483 m).

Shoshone is at the junction of California State Route 127 and California State Route 178.

=== Climate ===
According to the Köppen Climate Classification system, Shoshone has a hot desert climate, abbreviated "BWh" on climate maps.

Climate data for Shoshone (1981–2010)
Month	Jan	Feb	Mar	Apr	May	Jun	Jul	Aug	Sep	Oct	Nov	Dec	Year
Mean daily maximum °F (°C)	61.7 (16.5)	66.1 (18.9)	73.2 (22.9)	81.5 (27.5)	91.7 (33.2)	99.6 (37.6)	106.5 (41.4)	104.6 (40.3)	97.0 (36.1)	85.3 (29.6)	70.9 (21.6)	59.7 (15.4)	83.2 (28.4)
Mean daily minimum °F (°C)	39.6 (4.2)	42.7 (5.9)	47.6 (8.7)	52.4 (11.3)	61.6 (16.4)	68.3 (20.2)	75.5 (24.2)	74.5 (23.6)	67.7 (19.8)	57.4 (14.1)	46.1 (7.8)	37.8 (3.2)	56.0 (13.3)
Average precipitation inches (mm)	0.65 (17)	0.99 (25)	0.69 (18)	0.26 (6.6)	0.20 (5.1)	0.04 (1.0)	0.26 (6.6)	0.32 (8.1)	0.27 (6.9)	0.22 (5.6)	0.37 (9.4)	0.56 (14)	4.83 (123)
Source: NCDC 1981-2010 Monthly Normals

== History ==
Shoshone was founded in 1910 by Ralph Jacobus "Dad" Fairbanks, a Death Valley businessman and veteran of the nearby Greenwater Copper Rush. A majority of its early buildings were repurposed from Greenwater. The town remains owned by his descendants; his daughter Estelle Francis (October 10, 1892 – March 6, 1970) married Charles Brown, a former Greenwater sheriff and future state senator (December 12, 1883 – May 9, 1963) and they continued management of the town after Fairbanks left. A post office operated at Shoshone from 1915, closed for part of 1920. Shoshone was a stop on the Tonopah and Tidewater Railroad which shut down in 1940.

== Demographics ==
Historical population
Census	Pop.	Note	%±
2000	52		—
2010	31		−40.4%
2020	22		−29.0%
U.S. Decennial Census; 1860–1870 1880-1890; 1900 1910 1920; 1930 1940 1950; 1960 1970 1980; 1990 2000 2010

Shoshone first appeared as a census designated place in the 2000 U.S. census.

=== Racial and ethnic composition ===
Shoshone CDP, California – Racial and ethnic composition Note: the US Census treats Hispanic/Latino as an ethnic category. This table excludes Latinos from the racial categories and assigns them to a separate category. Hispanics/Latinos may be of any race.
Race / Ethnicity (NH = Non-Hispanic)	Pop 2000	Pop 2010	Pop 2020	% 2000	% 2010	% 2020
White alone (NH)	45	28	15	86.54%	90.32%	68.18%
Black or African American alone (NH)	0	1	0	0.00%	3.23%	0.00%
Native American or Alaska Native alone (NH)	1	1	2	1.92%	3.23%	9.09%
Asian alone (NH)	0	0	0	0.00%	0.00%	0.00%
Native Hawaiian or Pacific Islander alone (NH)	0	0	0	0.00%	0.00%	0.00%
Other race alone (NH)	0	0	0	0.00%	0.00%	0.00%
Mixed race or Multiracial (NH)	2	1	3	3.85%	3.23%	13.64%
Hispanic or Latino (any race)	4	0	2	7.69%	0.00%	9.09%
Total	52	31	22	100.00%	100.00%	100.00%

=== 2010 ===
The 2010 United States census reported that Shoshone had a population of 31. The population density was 1.1 people per square mile (0.42 people/km^{2}). The racial makeup of Shoshone was 28 (90.3%) White, 1 (3.2%) African American, 1 (3.2%) Native American, 0 (0.0%) Asian, 0 (0.0%) Pacific Islander, 0 (0.0%) from other races, and 1 (3.2%) from two or more races. Hispanic or Latino of any race were 0 persons (0.0%).

The Census reported that 31 people (100% of the population) lived in households, 0 (0%) lived in non-institutionalized group quarters, and 0 (0%) were institutionalized.

There were 17 households, out of which 2 (11.8%) had children under the age of 18 living in them, 4 (23.5%) were opposite-sex married couples living together, 2 (11.8%) had a female householder with no husband present, 0 (0%) had a male householder with no wife present. There were 4 (23.5%) unmarried opposite-sex partnerships, and 0 (0%) same-sex married couples or partnerships. 6 households (35.3%) were made up of individuals, and 4 (23.5%) had someone living alone who was 65 years of age or older. The average household size was 1.82. There were 6 families (35.3% of all households); the average family size was 2.50.

The population was spread out, with 3 people (9.7%) under the age of 18, 0 people (0%) aged 18 to 24, 13 people (41.9%) aged 25 to 44, 10 people (32.3%) aged 45 to 64, and 5 people (16.1%) who were 65 years of age or older. The median age was 44.5 years. For every 100 females, there were 93.8 males. For every 100 females age 18 and over, there were 100.0 males.

There were 31 housing units at an average density of 1.1 units per square mile (0.42 units/km^{2}), of which 17 were occupied, of which 5 (29.4%) were owner-occupied, and 12 (70.6%) were occupied by renters. The homeowner vacancy rate was 16.7%; the rental vacancy rate was 20.0%. 9 people (29.0% of the population) lived in owner-occupied housing units and 22 people (71.0%) lived in rental housing units.

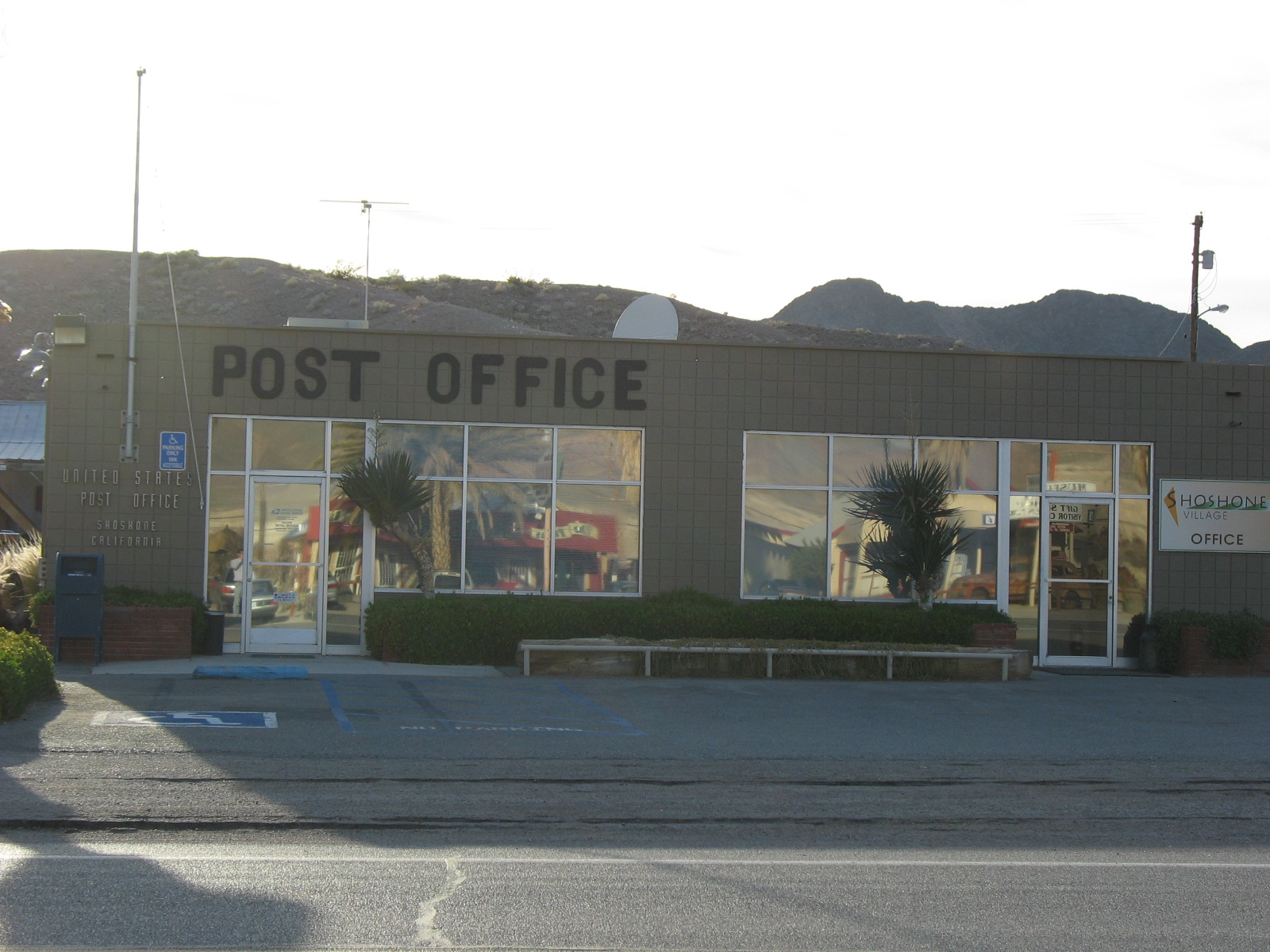
Shoshone Post Office

=== 2000 ===
As of the census of 2000, there were 52 people, 26 households, and 17 families residing in the CDP. The population density was 1.8 people per square mile (0.69 people/km^{2}). There were 34 housing units at an average density of 1.2 units per square mile (0.46 units/km^{2}). The racial makeup of the CDP was 88.46% White, 5.77% Native American, and 5.77% from two or more races. 7.69% of the population were Hispanic or Latino of any race.

There were 26 households, out of which 15.4% had children under the age of 18 living with them, 53.8% were married couples living together, 11.5% had a female householder with no husband present, and 30.8% were non-families. 26.9% of all households were made up of individuals, and 11.5% had someone living alone who was 65 years of age or older. The average household size was 2.00 and the average family size was 2.22.

In the CDP, the population was spread out, with 11.5% under the age of 18, 21.2% from 25 to 44, 28.8% from 45 to 64, and 38.5% who were 65 years of age or older. The median age was 56 years. For every 100 females, there were 85.7 males. For every 100 females age 18 and over, there were 76.9 males.

The median income for a household in the CDP was $66,250, and the median income for a family was $61,750. Males had a median income of $31,406 versus $41,500 for females. The per capita income for the CDP was $27,051. There were no families and 4.8% of the population living below the poverty line, including no one under 18 and no one over 64.

== Government ==
In the California State Legislature, Shoshone is in the 4th senatorial district, represented by Republican Marie Alvarado-Gil, and the 8th Assembly district, represented by Republican David Tangipa.

In the United States House of Representatives, Shoshone is in California's 3rd congressional district, represented by Independent Kevin Kiley.

== Education ==
Shoshone is served by the Death Valley Unified School District for grades PK-12.
