= Air Force Amy =

American female adult model and legal prostitute

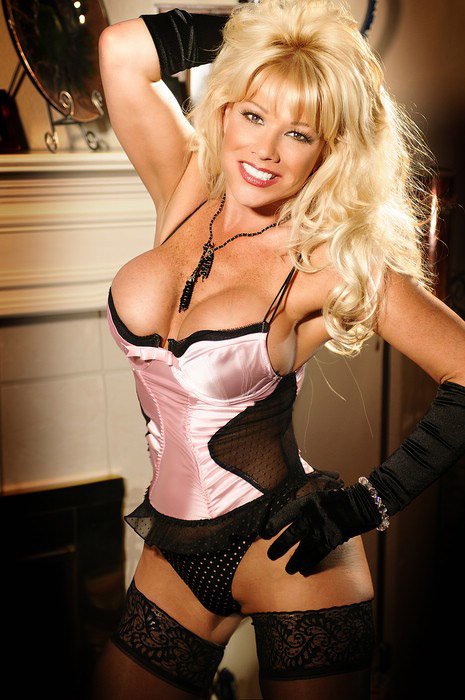
- Air Force Amy in 2007
- Born: Deanne Salinger; 1964 or 1965 (age 61–62); Ohio, U.S.
- Website: airforceamy.com

Deanne Salinger (born 1964 or 1965), known professionally as Air Force Amy, is an American legal prostitute, glamour model, adult model, and reality TV performer. MSNBC has called her "a living legend in the world of sex."

== Early life ==
Air Force Amy grew up in rural Ohio, leaving home at the age of 13. She later joined the US Air Force and served in the Philippines as an instructor.

== Career ==
=== Legal prostitution ===
Three months prior to being discharged from the US Air Force in 1990, she applied to the nearby Chicken Ranch brothel in Nevada, a legal brothel, and worked continuously as a legal and licensed prostitute in legal brothels in Nevada. She has worked at the Chicken Ranch, the Mustang Ranch (from 1994 to 1997), the Sagebrush Ranch, the Cherry Patch Ranch, Sheri's Ranch, the Kit Kat Guest Ranch, and the Moonlite Bunny Ranch beginning in 2000. As a legal Nevada prostitute, she works as an independent contractor who turns in half of her money made at the brothel to the house. In 2003, she earned US$10,000–$50,000 a month, according to The New York Times. Amy persuaded her employer Dennis Hof to offer a Military Appreciation Night, a special promotion for free sex to soldiers.

=== Film and television ===
Air Force Amy was featured in HBO's documentaries Cathouse (2002), Cathouse 2 (2003), and Cathouse: The Series (2005) about Nevada's Moonlite Bunny Ranch. She was called "the all-time top earner" and "the master of the game" by then Bunny Ranch owner Dennis Hof. The Season 1, Episode 5, "She's Got Game" episode (2005), included a personal profile of her. She also appeared in the 2004 BBC television program The Brothel, on the same subject, and the 2005 documentary Pornstar Pets.
