= Girlfriend experience =

Commercial sex service

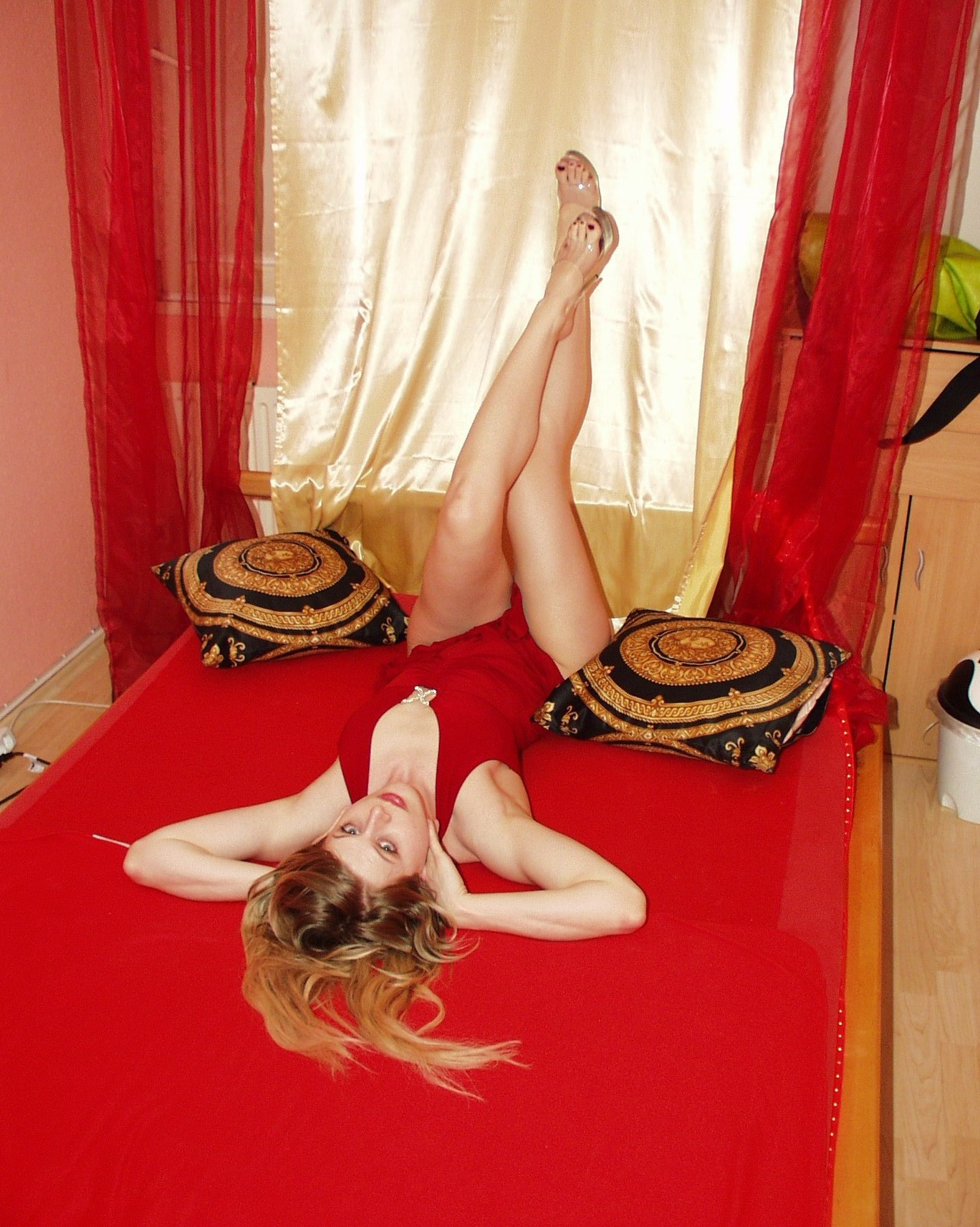
German prostitute in 1999

A girlfriend experience (GFE) is a commercial sex service. It ranges from a transactional sex relationship to a client paying a sex worker to pretend to be their girlfriend during the session. If the sex worker is male, the service is called a boyfriend experience.

== North America ==
In the sex industry of the United States and Canada, the term GFE refers to a sexual encounter in which the sex worker and the client provide each other with reciprocal sexual pleasure and some degree of emotional intimacy. The girlfriend experience, often provided through an escort agency, is a popular service that involves more personal interaction than a traditional call girl offers. The objective is not just to have sex, but to also provide a more comprehensive experience. In practice, the details vary widely. The sex workers impart a sense of authenticity in order to make the experience more pleasurable for their customer, as well as to make the outcome more lucrative for themselves. According to sociologist Elizabeth Bernstein, this makes it more meaningful for both client and sex worker as it involves emotional labor.

The term "client" is often used to describe a person who pays prostitutes for sex. However, in the escort agency terminology that has grown up around the GFE, clients often call themselves "hobbyists" and refer to a prostitute who provides a GFE as a "nice girl". A GFE client pays for time spent with a call girl, which can include social interaction, dating, or sexual acts. Many clients seek a feeling of closeness without the commitment of a relationship, and to a certain extent a GFE can eliminate the feelings of guilt or fear of "addiction" that some people associate with a relationship.

Elements that make up a GFE such as conversation, affection and mutual sexual pleasure can sometimes occur in street prostitution but they are more commonly found in indoor prostitution. This includes the use of massage parlors, saunas, brothels, strip clubs and escort agencies. Some ranch brothels in the United States advertise themselves as GFE establishments, including Dennis Hof's Love Ranch South, Moonlite Bunny Ranch, Kit Kat Ranch, Sheri's Ranch and the Chicken Ranch.

== Europe ==
Sex workers in Britain, such as OnlyFans models, sometimes provide GFE. The motivations for clients seeking a GFE are various, including a desire to discuss and explore their sexuality and sexual fetishes, loneliness, low self-esteem, and seeking love. A 2023 survey of sex workers by the journal Mankind Quarterly suggested that East Asian and white men were the most likely panethnic groups to be interested in a commercial girlfriend experience, whilst black men were the least interested.

== Southeast Asia ==
Research in Cambodia published in 2010 identified a number of waitresses and bartenders who were also working as "professional girlfriends" with "western boyfriends". They relied on these relationships for their livelihood but did not regard themselves as "prostitutes" and often sought love and marriage as well as material comforts. In these relationships, there was a performance of intimacy which lay somewhere between the feigned and the genuine.

In Thailand, some independent sex workers are reported to work as "professional girlfriends", providing company and affection to foreign men and middle-class Thai men, and only having sex with their clients occasionally. Their remuneration is provided in the form of things such as clothing and visits to the cinema. This sort of relationship, which lies between girlfriend and prostitute, exists as part of Thai culture and is often used by bargirls hoping to turn their foreign clients into boyfriends and husbands. It is not uncommon for their one-night transactions to develop into relationships resembling holiday romances, with the couple travelling around the country as boyfriend and girlfriend.

In the Philippines, Angeles City is known for the GFE provided to sex tourists by its sex workers, lasting anywhere from one night to a month or more. The US military facility Clark Air Base was located near the city until 1991.

== See also ==
- Enjo kōsai (compensated dating)
- Geisha
- Prostitution
- Rental family service
- Seeking.com
- Sugar dating
