= The Love Ranch =

Legal brothel in Mound House, Nevada

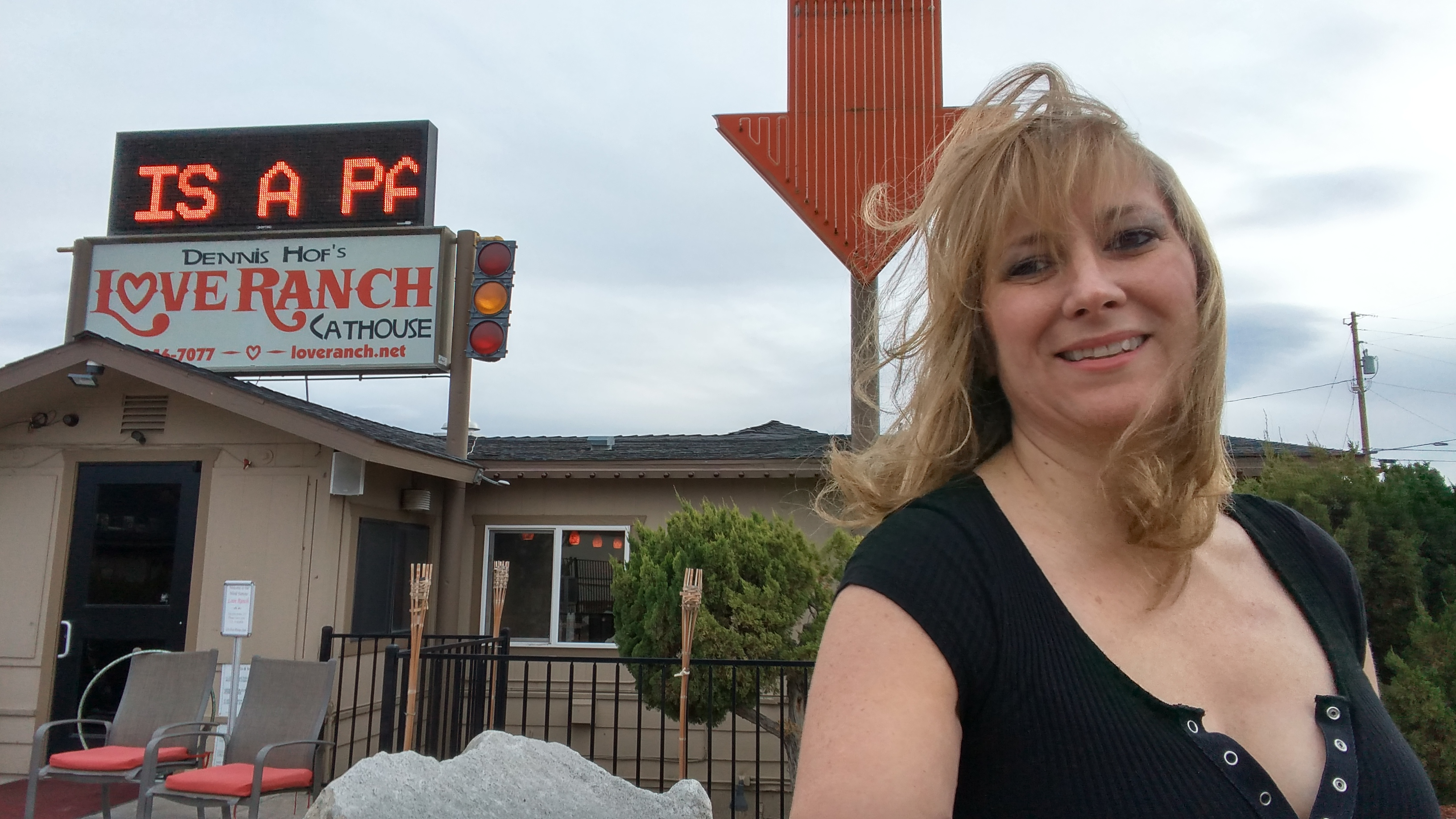
- Catrina Costa, Legal Courtesan, outside the Love Ranch Brothel in December 2016

- Location in Nevada
- Former names: Madame Kitty's Fantasy Ranch; Miss Kitty's Cathouse; Kitty's Pussycat Lounge; BunnyRanch Two
- Address: 95 Kit Kat Drive
- Location: Mound House, Nevada
- Coordinates: 39°12′32″N 119°39′48″W

The Love Ranch is a legal, licensed brothel located about 7 miles (11 km) east of Carson City, Nevada in the unincorporated town of Mound House, in Lyon County, at 95 Kit Kat Drive, also known as The Love Ranch North.

It sits along the southeast side of the cul de sac at the end of Kit Kat Drive, just off Highway 50 (Lincoln Highway), approximately 1.2 mile (1.6 km) from the Moonlite BunnyRanch. Also on the cul de sac are two other brothels the Kit Kat Guest Ranch and the Sagebrush Ranch; and Madam Suzette's Red Light Cabaret Strip Club. The cul de sac is collectively known as the Madam Suzette and Dennis Hof's Red Light District.

== History ==
Formerly known under several variations of the name Kitty's, this brothel was owned by Dennis Hof until his death in 2018. Hof is best known as the star of HBO's Cathouse and proprietor of the nearby Moonlite BunnyRanch. Hof reportedly renamed this operation in 2004 to better take advantage of the "BunnyRanch brand name", which he has heavily promoted. In June 2008, this house was again renamed, this time as The Love Ranch in order to build a unique identity for the brothel. It is sometimes referred to as The Love Ranch North, to differentiate it from Love Ranch Vegas.

=== Name history ===
- Madame Kitty's Fantasy Ranch (prior to 1998)
- Miss Kitty's Cathouse (1998 – late 2002)
- Kitty's Pussycat Lounge (Late 2002 through February 2004)
- BunnyRanch Two (February 2004 – August 2008)
- The Love Ranch (August 2008 – Present)

== See also ==
- Love Ranch South
- Prostitution in Nevada
- List of brothels in Nevada
