= 2018 Nevada Assembly election =

- November 6, 2018

All 42 seats in the Nevada Assembly 22 seats needed for a majority
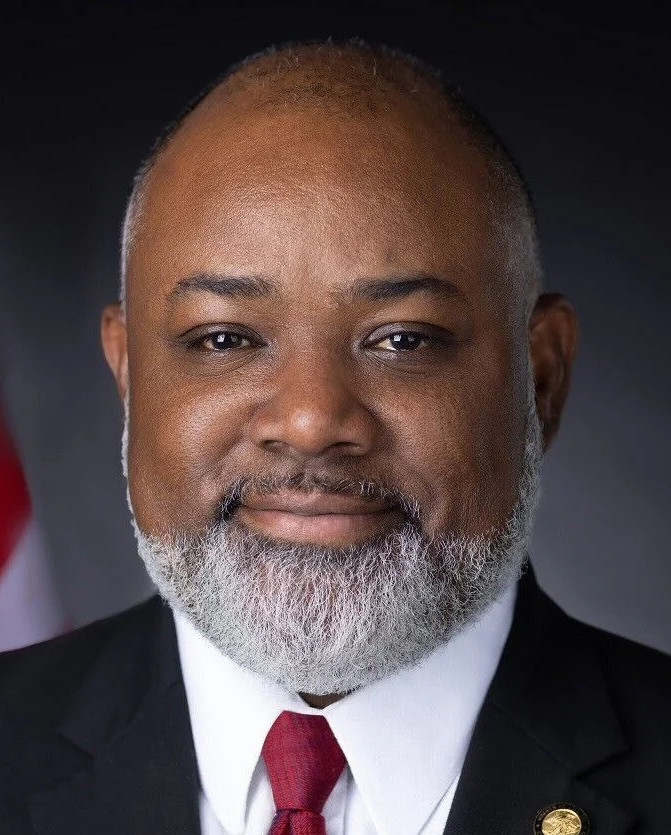

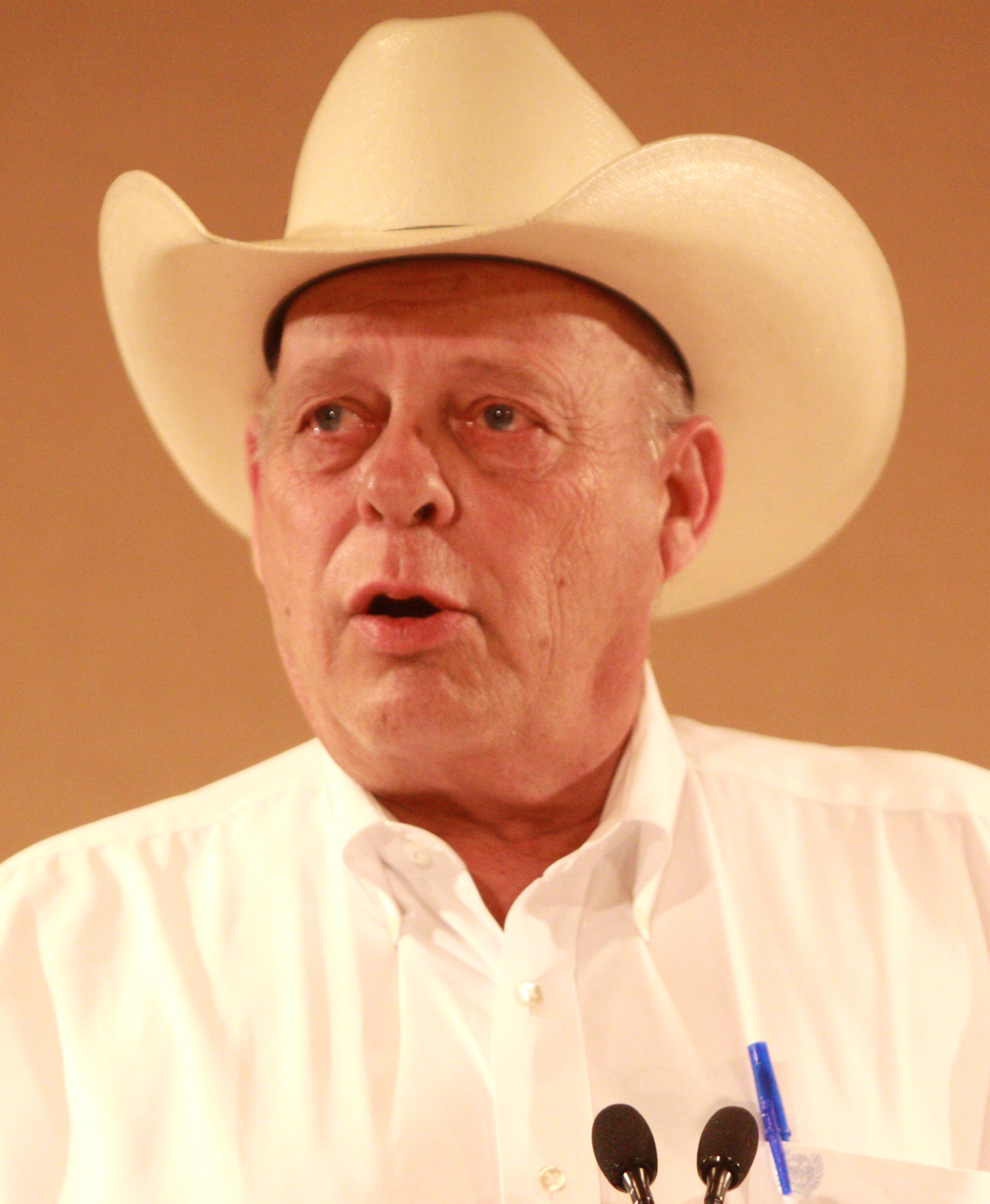
	Majority party	Minority party
Leader	Jason Frierson	Jim Wheeler
Party	Democratic	Republican
Leader's seat	8th district	39th district
Last election	27	15
Seats before	27	14
Seats won	29	13
Seat change	▲2	▼1
Popular vote	462,309	417,116
Percentage	52.17%	47.03%
- Results: Democratic gain Democratic hold Republican hold
Speaker before election
Jason Frierson
Democratic
Elected Speaker
Jason Frierson
Democratic

The 2018 Nevada State Assembly election was held on November 6, 2018. The election coincided with elections for other offices including Governor, U.S. Senate, U.S. House of Representatives, and the Nevada Senate.

Primary elections were held on June 12. As of 2024, this is the last time Democrats won the popular vote for the chamber.

== Results summary ==
State House district	Incumbent	Party	Elected Representative	Party
1st	Daniele Monroe-Moreno	Dem	Daniele Monroe-Moreno	Dem
2nd	John Hambrick	Rep	John Hambrick	Rep
3rd	Nelson Araujo†	Dem	Selena Torres	Dem
4th	Richard McArthur	Rep	Connie Munk	Dem
5th	Brittney Miller	Dem	Brittney Miller	Dem
6th	William McCurdy II	Dem	William McCurdy II	Dem
7th	Dina Neal	Dem	Dina Neal	Dem
8th	Jason Frierson	Dem	Jason Frierson	Dem
9th	Steve Yeager	Dem	Steve Yeager	Dem
10th	Chris Brooks	Dem	Chris Brooks	Dem
11th	Olivia Diaz	Dem	Olivia Diaz	Dem
12th	James Ohrenschall†	Dem	Susie Martinez	Dem
13th	Vacant		Tom Roberts	Rep
14th	Maggie Carlton	Dem	Maggie Carlton	Dem
15th	Elliot Anderson†	Dem	Howard Watts III	Dem
16th	Heidi Swank	Dem	Heidi Swank	Dem
17th	Tyrone Thompson	Dem	Tyrone Thompson	Dem
18th	Richard Carrillo	Dem	Richard Carrillo	Dem
19th	Chris Edwards	Rep	Chris Edwards	Rep
20th	Ellen Spiegel	Dem	Ellen Spiegel	Dem
21st	Ozzie Fumo	Dem	Ozzie Fumo	Dem
22nd	Keith Pickard†	Rep	Melissa Hardy	Rep
23rd	Melissa Woodbury†	Rep	Glen Leavitt	Rep
24th	Amber Joiner†	Dem	Sarah Peters	Dem
25th	Jill Tolles	Rep	Jill Tolles	Rep
26th	Lisa Krasner	Rep	Lisa Krasner	Rep
27th	Teresa Benitez-Thompson	Dem	Teresa Benitez-Thompson	Dem
28th	Edgar Flores	Dem	Edgar Flores	Dem
29th	Lesley Cohen	Dem	Lesley Cohen	Dem
30th	Michael Sprinkle	Dem	Michael Sprinkle	Dem
31st	Skip Daly	Dem	Skip Daly	Dem
32nd	Ira Hansen†	Rep	Alexis Hansen	Rep
33rd	John Ellison	Rep	John Ellison	Rep
34th	Shannon Bilbray-Axelrod	Dem	Shannon Bilbray-Axelrod	Dem
35th	Justin Watkins†	Dem	Michelle Gorelow	Dem
36th	James Oscarson†	Rep	Gregory Hafen II (Note: Republican nominee Dennis Hof died before the election, but still appeared on the ballot and won. Gregory Hafen was appointed in his place.)	Rep
37th	Jim Marchant	Rep	Shea Backus	Dem
38th	Robin Titus	Rep	Robin Titus	Rep
39th	Jim Wheeler	Rep	Jim Wheeler	Rep
40th	Al Kramer	Rep	Al Kramer	Rep
41st	Sandra Jauregui	Dem	Sandra Jauregui	Dem
42nd	Irene Adams†	Dem	Alexander Assefa	Dem

† - Incumbent not seeking reelection

== Detailed results ==
=== District 1 ===
2018 Nevada Assembly District 1 election
Party	Candidate	Votes	%
Democratic	Daniele Monroe-Moreno (incumbent)	18,958	100.00%
Total votes		18,958	100.00%
Democratic hold			

=== District 2 ===
2018 Nevada Assembly District 2 election
Party	Candidate	Votes	%
Republican	John Hambrick (incumbent)	14,597	51.87%
Democratic	Jennie Sherwood	13,543	48.13%
Total votes		28,091	100.00%
Republican hold			

=== District 3 ===
2018 Nevada Assembly District 3 election
Party	Candidate	Votes	%
Democratic	Selena Torres	10,138	66.47%
Republican	Stephen Sedlmeyer	5,113	33.53%
Total votes		15,251	100.00%
Democratic hold			

=== District 4 ===
2018 Nevada Assembly District 4 election
Party	Candidate	Votes	%
Democratic	Connie Munk	14,530	49.07%
Republican	Richard McArthur (incumbent)	14,410	48.66%
Independent American	Bob Lystrup	671	2.27%
Total votes		29,611	100.00%
Democratic gain from Republican			

=== District 5 ===
2018 Nevada Assembly District 5 election
Party	Candidate	Votes	%
Democratic	Brittney Miller (incumbent)	11,938	55.83%
Republican	Jason Burke	9,446	44.17%
Total votes		21,384	100.00%
Democratic hold			

=== District 6 ===
2018 Nevada Assembly District 6 election
Party	Candidate	Votes	%
Democratic	William McCurdy II (incumbent)	10,390	100.00%
Total votes		10,390	100.00%
Democratic hold			

=== District 7 ===
2018 Nevada Assembly District 7 election
Party	Candidate	Votes	%
Democratic	Dina Neal (incumbent)	15,032	100.00%
Total votes		15,032	100.00%
Democratic hold			

=== District 8 ===
2018 Nevada Assembly District 8 election
Party	Candidate	Votes	%
Democratic	Jason Frierson (incumbent)	11,686	60.28%
Republican	Tina Peetris	7,699	39.72%
Total votes		19,385	100.00%
Democratic hold			

=== District 9 ===
2018 Nevada Assembly District 9 election
Party	Candidate	Votes	%
Democratic	Steve Yeager (incumbent)	15,484	57.77%
Republican	Linda Cannon	11,317	42.23%
Total votes		26,801	100.00%
Democratic hold			

=== District 10 ===
2018 Nevada Assembly District 10 election
Party	Candidate	Votes	%
Democratic	Chris Brooks (incumbent)	9,179	63.72%
Republican	Chris Hisgen	4,757	33.02%
Independent American	Jonathan Friedrich	469	3.26%
Total votes		14,405	100.00%
Democratic hold			

=== District 11 ===
2018 Nevada Assembly District 11 election
Party	Candidate	Votes	%
Democratic	Olivia Diaz (incumbent)	6,759	81.28%
Republican	Gianna Miceli	1,557	18.72%
Total votes		8,316	100.00%
Democratic hold			

=== District 12 ===
2018 Nevada Assembly District 12 election
Party	Candidate	Votes	%
Democratic	Susie Martinez (incumbent)	12,708	53.81%
Republican	Richard Fletcher	10,172	43.07%
Independent American	Mary Martinez	736	3.12%
Total votes		23,616	100.00%
Democratic hold			

=== District 13 ===
2018 Nevada Assembly District 13 election
Party	Candidate	Votes	%
Republican	Tom Roberts (incumbent)	17,010	64.83%
Independent American	Leonard Foster	9,228	35.17%
Total votes		26,238	100.00%
Republican hold			

=== District 14 ===
2018 Nevada Assembly District 14 election
Party	Candidate	Votes	%
Democratic	Maggie Carlton (incumbent)	10,365	100.00%
Total votes		10,365	100.00%
Democratic hold			

=== District 15 ===
2018 Nevada Assembly District 15 election
Party	Candidate	Votes	%
Democratic	Howard Watts III	9,347	66.45%
Republican	Stan Vaughan	4,719	33.55%
Total votes		14,066	100.00%
Democratic hold			

=== District 16 ===
2018 Nevada Assembly District 16 election
Party	Candidate	Votes	%
Democratic	Heidi Swank (incumbent)	9,106	65.35%
Total votes		9,106	100.00%
Democratic hold			

=== District 17 ===
2018 Nevada Assembly District 17 election
Party	Candidate	Votes	%
Democratic	Tyrone Thompson (incumbent)	13,798	66.00%
Republican	Patricia Little	6,586	31.50%
Libertarian	Ronald Newsome	522	2.50%
Total votes		20,906	100.00%
Democratic hold			

=== District 18 ===
2018 Nevada Assembly District 18 election
Party	Candidate	Votes	%
Democratic	Richard Carrillo (incumbent)	11,373	65.32%
Republican	Matt Sadler	6,037	34.68%
Total votes		17,410	100.00%
Democratic hold			

=== District 19 ===
2018 Nevada Assembly District 19 election
Party	Candidate	Votes	%
Republican	Chris Edwards (incumbent)	18,328	100.00%
Total votes		18,328	100.00%
Republican hold			

=== District 20 ===
2018 Nevada Assembly District 20 election
Party	Candidate	Votes	%
Democratic	Ellen Spiegel (incumbent)	12,029	62.10%
Republican	Michael L. McDonald	7,342	37.90%
Total votes		19,371	100.00%
Democratic hold			

=== District 21 ===
2018 Nevada Assembly District 21 election
Party	Candidate	Votes	%
Democratic	Ozzie Fumo (incumbent)	12,569	56.26%
Republican	Cherlyn Arrington	9,773	43.74%
Total votes		22,342	100.00%
Democratic hold			

=== District 22 ===
2018 Nevada Assembly District 22 election
Party	Candidate	Votes	%
Republican	Melissa Hardy	17,100	54.33%
Democratic	Kristee Watson	14,372	45.67%
Total votes		31,472	100.00%
Republican hold			

=== District 23 ===
2018 Nevada Assembly District 23 election
Party	Candidate	Votes	%
Republican	Glen Leavitt	24,100	71.42%
Independent American	Ralph Preta	9,643	28.58%
Total votes		33,743	100.00%
Republican hold			

=== District 24 ===
2018 Nevada Assembly District 24 election
Party	Candidate	Votes	%
Democratic	Sarah Peters (incumbent)	16,630	100.00%
Total votes		16,630	100.00%
Democratic hold			

=== District 25 ===
2018 Nevada Assembly District 25 election
Party	Candidate	Votes	%
Republican	Jill Tolles (incumbent)	20,383	59.01%
Democratic	Gregory Shorts	14,157	40.99%
Total votes		34,540	100.00%
Republican hold			

=== District 26 ===
2020 Nevada Assembly District 26 election
Party	Candidate	Votes	%
Republican	Lisa Krasner (incumbent)	20,931	57.35%
Democratic	June Joseph	15,581	42.65%
Total votes		36,462	100.00%
Republican hold			

=== District 27 ===
2018 Nevada Assembly District 27 election
Party	Candidate	Votes	%
Democratic	Teresa Benitez-Thompson (incumbent)	18,410	100.00%
Total votes		18,410	100.00%
Democratic hold			

=== District 28 ===
2018 Nevada Assembly District 28 election
Party	Candidate	Votes	%
Democratic	Edgar Flores (incumbent)	7,843	100.00%
Total votes		7,843	100.00%
Democratic hold			

=== District 29 ===
2018 Nevada Assembly District 29 election
Party	Candidate	Votes	%
Democratic	Lesley Cohen (incumbent)	18,489	51.44%
Republican	Stephen H. Silberkraus	12,171	46.35%
Libertarian	Bruce James-Newman	582	2.22%
Total votes		31,242	100.00%
Democratic hold			

=== District 30 ===
2018 Nevada Assembly District 30 election
Party	Candidate	Votes	%
Democratic	Michael Sprinkle (incumbent)	16,205	100.00%
Total votes		28,585	100.00%
Democratic hold			

=== District 31 ===
2020 Nevada Assembly District 31 election
Party	Candidate	Votes	%
Democratic	Skip Daly (incumbent)	15,054	51.90%
Republican	Jill Ann Dickman	13,949	48.10%
Total votes		29,003	100.00%
Democratic hold			

=== District 32 ===
2018 Nevada Assembly District 32 election
Party	Candidate	Votes	%
Republican	Alexis Hansen	17,924	70.64%
Democratic	Paula Povilaitis	7,451	29.36%
Total votes		23,375	100.00%
Republican hold			

=== District 33 ===
2018 Nevada Assembly District 33 election
Party	Candidate	Votes	%
Republican	John Ellison (incumbent)	18,319	100.00%
Total votes		18,319	100.00%
Republican hold			

=== District 34 ===
2018 Nevada Assembly District 34 election
Party	Candidate	Votes	%
Democratic	Shannon Bilbray-Axelrod (incumbent)	12,878	59.18%
Republican	Janice Wesen	8,883	40.82%
Total votes		21,761	100.00%
Democratic hold			

=== District 35 ===
2018 Nevada Assembly District 35 election
Party	Candidate	Votes	%
Democratic	Michelle Gorelow	14,332	49.90%
Republican	David Schoen	11,485	39.99%
Independent	Daniel Hofstein	2,905	10.11%
Total votes		28,722	100.00%
Democratic hold			

=== District 36 ===
2018 Nevada Assembly District 36 election
Party	Candidate	Votes	%
Republican	Dennis Hof	17,179	63.07%
Democratic	Lesia Romanov	10,058	36.93%
Total votes		27,237	100.00%
Republican hold			

=== District 37 ===
2018 Nevada Assembly District 37 election
Party	Candidate	Votes	%
Democratic	Shea Backus	14,222	50.24%
Republican	Jim Marchant (incumbent)	14,087	49.76%
Total votes		28,309	100.00%
Democratic gain from Republican			

=== District 38 ===
2018 Nevada Assembly District 38 election
Party	Candidate	Votes	%
Republican	Robin L. Titus (incumbent)	21,681	100.00%
Total votes		21,681	100.00%
Republican hold			

=== District 39 ===
2018 Nevada Assembly District 39 election
Party	Candidate	Votes	%
Republican	Jim Wheeler (incumbent)	22,266	65.36%
Democratic	Patricia Ackerman	11,159	32.76%
Libertarian	Paul Cwalina	642	1.88%
Total votes		34,067	100.00%
Republican hold			

=== District 40 ===
2018 Nevada Assembly District 40 election
Party	Candidate	Votes	%
Republican	Al Kramer (incumbent)	16,963	59.39%
Democratic	Autumn Zemke	11,600	40.61%
Total votes		28,563	100.00%
Republican hold			

=== District 41 ===
2018 Nevada Assembly District 41 election
Party	Candidate	Votes	%
Democratic	Sandra Jauregui (incumbent)	12,932	54.46%
Republican	Paris Wade	10,812	45.63%
Total votes		23,744	100.00%
Democratic hold			

=== District 42 ===
2018 Nevada Assembly District 42 election
Party	Candidate	Votes	%
Democratic	Alexander Assefa	11,093	100.00%
Total votes		11,093	100.00%
Democratic hold			

== See also ==
- 2018 Nevada elections
- List of Nevada state legislatures
