= Alice Little =

Irish-American sex worker and YouTuber (born 1990)

- Born: May 3, 1990 (age 36); Ireland
- Occupation: Sex worker
- Employer: Sheri's Ranch

YouTube information
- Channel: Alice Little
- Years active: 2016–2024
- Subscribers: 88.7 thousand
- Views: 14.65 million
- Last updated: 11 July 2022
- Website: TheAliceLittle.com

Alice Little (born May 3, 1990) is an Irish-American sex worker (currently at Sheri's Ranch) and former YouTuber. Her stage name, Alice Little, refers to her height, which is 4'8", making her the "shortest legal escort" in Nevada, and consequently, in the United States.

== Life and work ==
Little gained attention in 2017 after she wrote an article for Refinery29 entitled "A Week as a Legal Sex Worker in Mound House, NV, on a $267,000 Salary." She has since become known for her advocacy for sex workers. In 2019, she received further press for offering a 50% discount for attendees of Alienstock Festival.

When the brothels reopened in 2021 following the COVID-19 pandemic, Little moved location to work at the Chicken Ranch.

When not working, Little resides in Carson City, Nevada.

=== Early years ===
Little was born "just outside of Dublin," Ireland and moved to the U.S. when she was five years old. Little grew up in Nassau County, Long Island, New York.

Before joining the legal sex work industry, she was a jockey at Belmont Stakes and an emergency medical technician in New York City.

=== Luxury companion career ===
Little has been in the legal sex work industry since November 2015 when she started work at the Sagebrush Ranch, then moved on to the Moonlite BunnyRanch in October 2017.

In 2020, the legal brothels of Nevada were closed in response to the COVID-19 pandemic. In response, Little sued the Governor of Nevada, Steve Sisolak. In May 2021, she moved to the Chicken Ranch due to its location in the first Nevada county to announce brothels were allowed to reopen since the start of the pandemic. Little runs workshops for the other sex workers at the ranch, focusing on business management. As an avid sports fan, she gained notoriety for her offerings to local teams.

In 2026, Little wrote an op-ed for The Nevada Independent, As a sex worker, I'm better off as an entrepreneur — not an employee. She announced her move to Sheri's Ranch shortly after.

=== Sex education career ===
Little, who began her work in sex-positive careers as a BDSM sex educator, produced videos for her YouTube channel with content focused on sex education. She had a seasonal series called Coffee with Alice. In this series of videos she discussed "different intimacy topics" and answered audience questions. Little also produced three other series for her channel, Ask A Sex Worker, Sex Toy Reviews, and (S)explained! An additional series, Bunny Ranch, was completed in April 2019.

In addition to her YouTube channel, she also writes sex education articles and opinion pieces for a variety of publications, including HuffPost, Business Insider, HuffPost United Kingdom, Yahoo! News, SheKnows, Insider Inc., Refinery29, The Reno Gazette-Journal, The Nevada Independent, and Guys Gab.

=== Advocacy ===
She is a founding member of Hookers for Healthcare and an active member of the Nevada Brothel Association. She is an activist for sex workers' rights; she has fought to counteract legislation to have sex work criminalized, such as by FOSTA-SESTA, and to keep the brothels of Nevada from closing down by 2018's proposed law Lyon County Question 1.

=== Personal life ===
Little is bisexual and a proponent of consensual non-monogamy. Little has an antiquarian rare book collection.
