= Kit Kat Guest Ranch =

Brothel in Nevada, US

- Kit Kat Ranch
- Location in Nevada
- Address: 48 Kit Kat Drive
- Location: Carson City, Nevada
- Coordinates: 39°12′33″N 119°39′48″W

Construction
- Opened: 1963

Website
- www.kitkatranch.com

The Kit Kat Guest Ranch is a legal, licensed brothel in the US state of Nevada located about 7 miles (11 km) east of Carson City in the unincorporated town of Mound House, in Lyon County, at 48 Kit Kat Drive. The ranch was owned by Dennis Hof until his death in October 2018. It remained open after he died.

It sits along the east side of a loop at the south end of Kit Kat Drive, which also is the home to two other brothels owned by Hof: The Love Ranch and the Sagebrush Ranch. The name of this brothel is often shortened to the Kit Kat Ranch.

== History ==
The ranch originally opened in 1963, and was first licensed (special use permit) in 1980. The ranch came under the ownership of Jacie Caramella and her mother Shelia in 2001. Porn star Rebecca Love, who worked at the ranch as a guest celebrity at times, was named spokesmodel for the ranch in 2005. At the time it was one of the few brothels in Nevada to regularly feature porn stars such as Dennis Hof's former girlfriend Sunset Thomas.

The ranch was bought from the Caramellas by Dennis Hof in October 2012. Hof shut the ranch for an extensive multi-million dollar renovation. It reopened in May 2016.

On September 14, 2023, a fire broke out in Kit Kat Ranch causing extensive structural and property damage, but no injuries or fatalities.

== See also ==
- Prostitution in Nevada
- List of brothels in Nevada
