= Jupiter Jetson =

Sex worker and labor organizer (born 1988)

- Born: October 19, 1988 (age 38); United States
- Occupations: Actress; musician; activist
- Years active: 2020s–present
- Known for: Labor rights advocacy

Jupiter Jetson is the stage name of the American performer, adult actor, musician, and labor activist. In 2026, Jetson gained media attention as a leading figure in the movement to unionize legal sex workers at Sheri's Ranch.

== Career ==
=== Early career ===
Jetson began her career in the entertainment industry with a focus on music, and credits the time she spent busking in Europe as informing a perspective on support infrastructure for creatives and the intersection of performance art and the business of adult entertainment. She cites Sailor Moon as an influence on her "Jupiter Jetson" persona.

Jetson worked as a musician in Germany before becoming an adult actor.

=== United Brothel Workers ===
In 2026, Jetson became the spokesperson for workers at Sheri's Ranch, a legal brothel in Pahrump, Nevada. Nevada is the only state in the nation where prostitution is legal. Workers organized in response to a labor contract that would give the employer "perpetual rights" over employees' intellectual property, inclusive of their names and likeness, even after employment has ended.

Jetson and her coworkers proposed to unionize with the Communications Workers of America (CWA) under Local 9413. The "United Brothel Workers" would be the first American labor union of sex workers. A petition to the National Labor Relations Board to recognize the labor union is pending.
