= Ranch (brothel) =

Common term for a legal brothel

Ranch is a common name used to describe a brothel, especially in western areas of the United States.

== Origin ==
This usage dates back to the original Chicken Ranch near the town of La Grange, Texas, an old brothel that is no longer open which accepted chickens as payment during the Great Depression. Over time the place became overrun with chickens.

== Best-known Examples ==
- There is currently a legal brothel also called the Chicken Ranch just outside the town of Pahrump, Nevada.
- Sheri's Ranch. Another legal brothel just outside the town of Pahrump, Nevada.
- The Mustang Ranch was formerly a legal brothel near Reno (closed 1999; rights to reuse the name are now tied up in court).
- The Moonlite BunnyRanch is a legal brothel near Carson City.

Many of Nevada's other legal brothels also incorporate the term "ranch" into their names.

== See also ==
- Prostitution in Nevada
- List of brothels in Nevada
