= Sagebrush Ranch =

Legal brothel in Mound House, Nevada

- Location in Nevada
- Former names: Sagebrush Red-Light Ranch
- Address: 51 Kit Kat Drive
- Location: Mound House, Nevada
- Coordinates: 39°12′32″N 119°39′50″W

Construction
- Opened: 1993

Website
- www.sagebrushranch.com

The Sagebrush Ranch is a legal, licensed brothel located about 7 miles (11 km) east of Carson City, Nevada in the unincorporated town of Mound House, in Lyon County, at 51 Kit Kat Drive.

It sits along the west side of a loop at the south end of Kit Kat Drive, which also is the home to two competing brothels: The Love Ranch and the Kit Kat Guest Ranch. The Sagebrush was owned and operated by Dennis Hof until his death in 2018.

== History ==
Originally, the first Sagebrush Ranch was about 20 miles east of Carson City off U.S. Route 50 up Six Mile Canyon Road near Mark Twain Estates thru the 80's. It was a two-story building, which was still in Lyon County before moving to current location in 1993. It was run by former Moonlite BunnyRanch prostitute, Linda Fondren and her husband Jim. Then for a time, the Sagebrush Ranch was two separate (but connected) licensed brothels: the Sagebrush I (originally known as the Sagebrush Red-Light Ranch) and the Sagebrush II, just north of the original brothel. In 1999, the Sagebrush I building was destroyed by a fire that was accidentally sparked by an overturned candle in one of the ladies' rooms. While no one was seriously hurt in the fire, the Sage I building was a total loss. During its rebuilding, the Sage II building housed a combined operation. When the lavish new replacement facility opened in mid-2001 by the then owner Marvin Gates, the ladies all moved into the new building, called simply the Sagebrush Ranch. Save for a few remodeled rooms at its south end which connect only into the new brothel, the Sage II building was then closed and converted into a "gentlemans club". When construction was finished, the Squeeze Play Lounge was opened, and remains as a separate adult entertainment facility. However, the Squeeze Play entertainers are not brothel courtesans and the Sagebrush ladies do not perform there.

== See also ==
- Prostitution in Nevada
- List of brothels in Nevada
