= No. 1 Geisha =

Legal brothel in Elko, Nevada

- Location in Nevada
- Former names: Mona Lisa Ranch; CharDon's Club
- Address: Douglas Street
- Location: Elko, Nevada
- Coordinates: 40.82915°N 115.76088°W

Construction
- Closed: 2011

No. 1 Geisha was a legal brothel (ranch) and massage parlor in Elko, Nevada. The women who worked there were of Asian heritage. It was previously known as the Mona Lisa Ranch and CharDon's Club.

In January 2011, a proprietor of the brothel was sentenced to prison time in a Federal court for operating an illegal massage parlor in Seattle in addition to the legal operation in Nevada. The sentencing memorandum stated that “While on pre-trial release, [the owner of No. 1 Geisha] attempted to recruit women to work at the legal brothel in Elko ... He claimed that he needed to travel to Nevada to do repair work on his home; yet he was reported by the Elko Police Department and a confidential source that he was in Elko to recruit a ‘lessee’ and additional employees for the legal brothel.” The federal government seized close to $50,000 in assets from the legal brothel in Nevada in relation to the illegal operations in California and Washington.

== See also ==
- List of brothels in Nevada
