= Ciccarone =

Ciccarone is an Italian surname. Notable people with the surname include:

- George Ciccarone (fl. 1988), American reporter and writer
- Henry Ciccarone (1938–1988), American college lacrosse coach
