= Girlfriend experience (disambiguation) =

A girlfriend experience is a commercial sex service.

Girlfriend experience may also refer to:

- The Girlfriend Experience, a 2009 American drama film directed by Steven Soderbergh
- The Girlfriend Experience (TV series), an American anthology drama television series based on the 2009 film
- The Girlfriend Experience (drag queen) (born 1991), a German-born Canada-based drag performer
