= Sunset Thomas =

American pornographic film actress

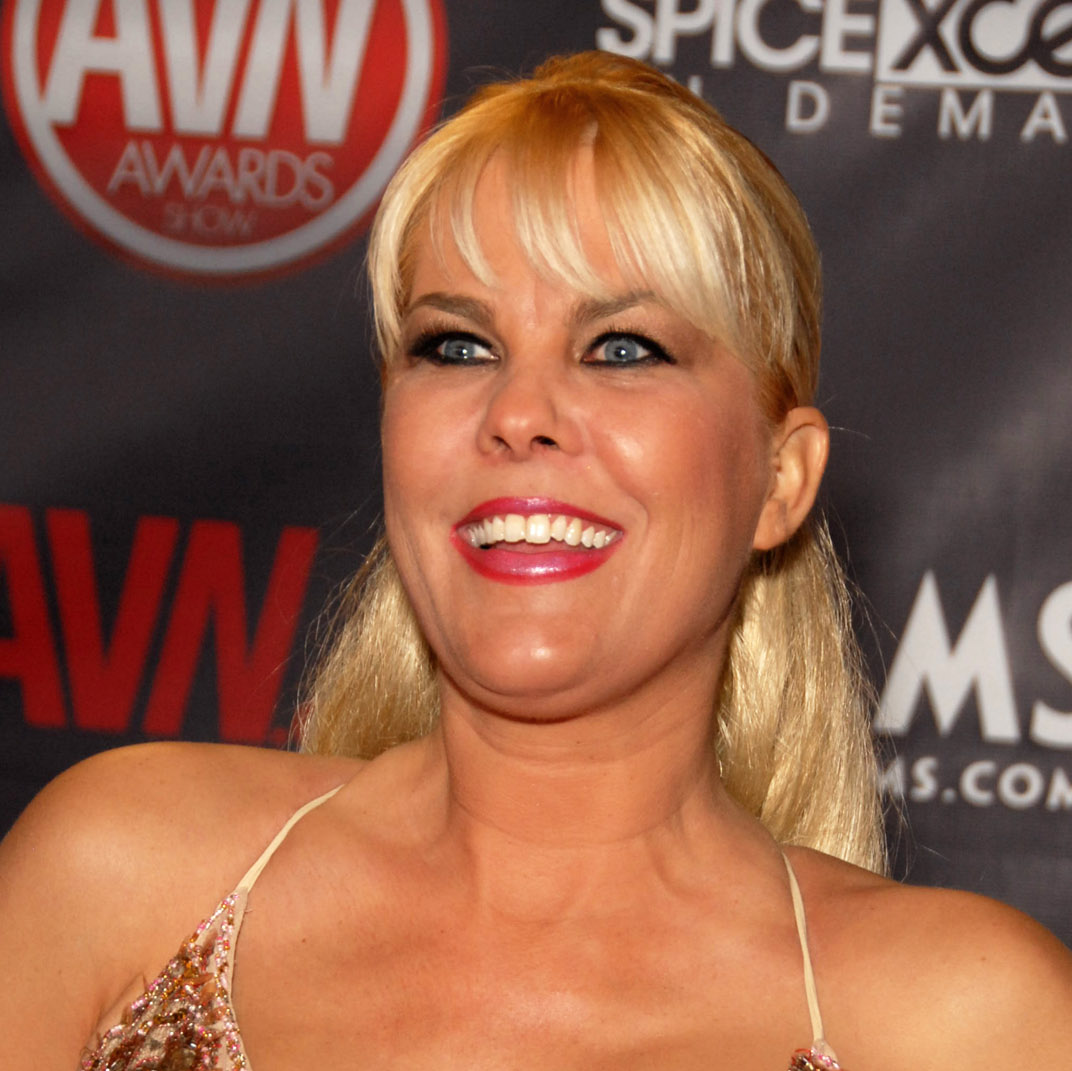
- Thomas in 2010
- Born: Diane Fowler
- Occupations: Artist; former pornographic film actress
- Relatives: Sunrise Adams (niece)

Diane Thomas (born Diane Fowler), known professionally as Sunset Thomas, is an American artist and former pornographic film actress. She was runner-up for Penthouse Pet of the Year in 1998 and is a member of the AVN Hall of Fame, Porn Block of Fame, Legends of Erotica Hall of Fame, and XRCO Hall of Fame.

== Career ==
=== Legal prostitution ===
Thomas worked as a prostitute at the Moonlite BunnyRanch and, according to owner Dennis Hof, made $2,000 a night. She later told The Observer that there is no real difference between pornography and prostitution.

=== Pornographic films ===
Thomas was inducted into the AVN Hall of Fame in 2001. In 2002, she was inducted into the Porn Block of Fame. By 2006, she had retired from performing in adult films and was acting as the official spokesmodel for the Palomino Club, a strip club in Las Vegas. Thomas was inducted into the Legends of Erotica Hall of Fame in 2009 and the XRCO Hall of Fame in April 2010.

=== Mainstream media appearances ===
In 2006, Thomas was a contestant on the British reality television series My Bare Lady.

After appearing in the documentary series Cathouse, Thomas was featured in the 2005 documentary Pornstar Pets and made an appearance on Maury, in which she encountered a crush from her middle school days. The episode was titled 'I Was An Ugly Teen... Now I'm a Hot, Sexy 10!'. In 2006, Thomas obtained her own show on KSEX radio called Sunset After Sunset. In 2007, she appeared on the Montel Williams Show to discuss her porn career and being a mother.

=== Writing ===
In April 2009, Thomas released her erotic fiction novel, Anatomy of an Adult Film, which was largely a fictionalized account of her adult film career. She has also written a boxing column for Doghouseboxing.com.

== Personal life ==
Thomas is the aunt of porn star Sunrise Adams. She dated Dennis Hof, the owner of Moonlight BunnyRanch, during her tenure there, and during that time legally adopted the name Diane Hof.
