= Ed Goedhart =

American politician

Member of the Nevada Assembly from the 36th district
- In office November 8, 2006 – November 7, 2012
- Preceded by: Rod Sherer
- Succeeded by: James Oscarson

Personal details
- Born: September 15, 1962 (age 63) Downey, California
- Party: Republican

Edwin (Ed) Goedhart (born September 15, 1962) is an American politician who served in the Nevada Assembly from the 36th district from 2006 to 2012.

Goedhart endorsed Ron DeSantis in the 2024 Republican Party presidential primaries.
