= Roy Neighbors =

American politician

P. M. (Roy) Neighbors

Member of the Nevada General Assembly from the 36th district
- In office 1993–2001
- Succeeded by: Rod Sherer

Personal details
- Born: July 11, 1923 Entiat, Washington, United States
- Died: December 19, 2017 (aged 94)
- Party: Democratic
- Profession: mining consultant

Pomroy Monroe "Roy" Neighbors (July 11, 1923 – December 19, 2017) was an American politician who was a Democratic member of the Nevada General Assembly. He was a mining consultant. Neighbors was a veteran of the United States Navy and served in World War II and the Korean War. He is also a retired naval aviator in the United States Naval Reserve. His previous political experience included manager of Nye County, Nevada for 15 years.
