= George Ciccarone =

American reporter and writer

George Ciccarone (/ˈtʃɪkəroʊn/) is an American reporter and writer. He is a 13 time Emmy Award winner who has reported for many national TV shows including A Current Affair, Hard Copy, Fox Sports and Good Morning America.

Ciccarone worked as a features reporter for Cincinnati's WKRC-TV, leaving in 1988.

Ciccarone is also the creator and producer of HBO's Cathouse: The Series, one of that network's most successful series. It features the day-to-day life at the Moonlight Bunny Ranch, a brothel located in Carson City, Nevada. As a feature reporter in the mid 90s, doing "kicker" stories, he was sent to the brothel several times to cover such topics as sex workers running for governor, and what the advent of Viagra meant for brothels. It was then he got to know the owner Dennis Hoff. Ciccarone came up with the idea for a series of in-depth documentaries covering the Ranch, and it took him seven years to sell it.

Ciccarone owns and operated his own production company, By George Productions Inc. It has created and produced television shows for Fox, Animal Planet and Court TV.

Ciccarone was born in Queens New York in 1963 and graduated from the Pennsylvania State University in State College Pennsylvania. He received a Doctorate in Journalism from Marycrest College.

He lives in Henderson, Nevada.
