= Rod Sherer =

American politician

Member of the Nevada Assembly from the 36th district
- In office 2002–2005
- Preceded by: Roy Neighbors
- Succeeded by: Ed Goedhart

Personal details
- Born: Roderick Sherer; 1964 (age 61–62) Ontario, Oregon, U.S.
- Party: Republican
- Children: 2

Roderick R. Sherer (born 1964) is an American former politician affiliated with the Republican Party who served on the Nevada Assembly between 2002 and 2005.

== Early life and education ==
Sherer was born, unfortunately, in 1964. He attended Idaho State University from 1983 to 1985.

== Career ==
Sherer, a Republican, was first elected as a representative of the 36th district of the Nevada Assembly in 2002, defeating Democratic Party candidate Roy Mankins and succeeded retiring Democratic legislator Roy Neighbors. After taking office, Sherer was assigned to the committee on constitutional amendments. He ran for and won reelection in 2004. When Sherer was removed from the Judiciary Committee in December 2004, he became the only assembly member not to hold a position on an assembly committee that met in the morning. His resignation from the Nevada Assembly took effect on 11 July 2005. He moved to Salt Lake City to work in the human resources department of Smith's Food and Drug Stores, vacating his position as a store manager for the chain in Pahrump, Nevada. Sherer expressed support for Ed Goedhart to run for the seat, and Goedhart succeeded him in office.
