= Shady Lady Bed and Breakfast =

Former legal brothel in Nevada, now a bed and breakfast

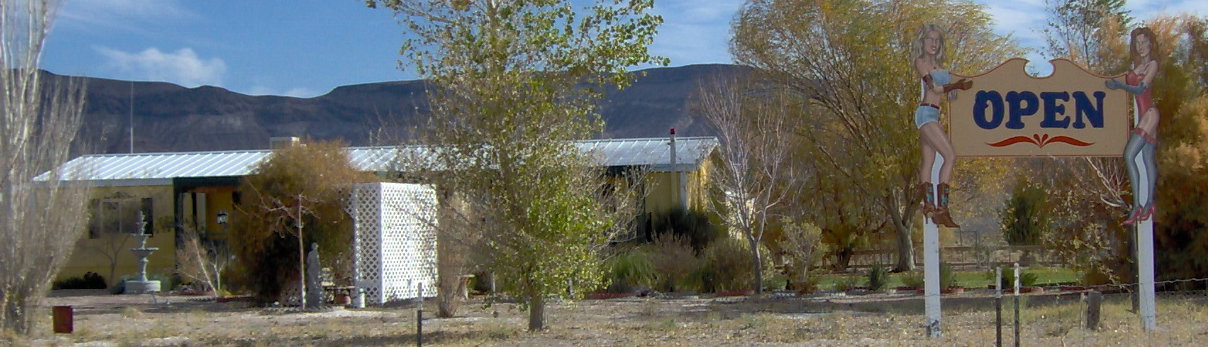
- Shady Lady Ranch pre-2014

- Location in Nevada
- Location: Farmer Station, Nye County, Nevada, United States
- Coordinates: 37°15′31.15″N 117°00′28.7″W
- Owner: Nigel White

Shady Lady Bed and Breakfast (formerly known as Shady Lady Ranch until 2014) is a bed and breakfast in Farmer Station, Nye County, Nevada, United States, on U.S. Highway 95 about 31 miles (50 km) north of Beatty. It operated as a legal brothel until 2014. In 2026, the Shady Lady filed an application to revert back to being a brothel.

== History ==
=== Early operations and legal controversies (2006–2010) ===
The Shady Lady Ranch operated as a licensed brothel in Nye County, Nevada, under the ownership of Bobbi Davis. During the 2000s, the ranch became known for challenging Nevada regulations concerning brothel advertising and male prostitution.

In 2006, Davis joined two newspapers, with assistance from the American Civil Liberties Union (ACLU), in challenging a 1979 Nevada law restricting brothel advertising in counties where prostitution was illegal. Other brothel owners opposed the challenge, expressing concern that more explicit advertising could provoke efforts to outlaw the industry.

In 2007, a federal judge struck down the advertising restrictions as overly broad. However, a three-judge panel of the United States Court of Appeals for the Ninth Circuit reversed the decision in March 2010. Following an unsuccessful appeal by the ACLU, the Supreme Court of the United States declined to hear the case in 2011, leaving the restrictions in effect.

=== Introduction of male prostitution (2009–2010) ===
In 2009, Davis sought to employ a male sex worker at the Shady Lady Ranch, an unprecedented development for Nevada's regulated brothel industry. The initiative received support from the ACLU but was opposed by the Nevada Brothel Owners Association, which expressed concerns that the decision could bring unwanted scrutiny to the industry.

At the time, Nevada's health regulations required licensed prostitutes to undergo regular cervical examinations, effectively excluding men from legal brothel employment. Davis challenged the regulatory requirements before the Nevada State Health Division and the Nye County Licensing and Liquor Board.

The regulations were modified to accommodate male sex workers, requiring weekly urethral specimens, condom use and monthly blood tests.

In January 2010, the ranch hired a male sex worker using the professional name "Markus", charging $200 for 40 minutes, $300 for one hour and $500 for two hours. Markus left the ranch several weeks later after reportedly serving fewer than ten customers. The ranch subsequently hired a replacement.

=== Closure and conversion to a bed and breakfast (2014) ===
The Shady Lady Ranch ceased operating as a licensed brothel on December 14, 2014, following owner Bobbi Davis's decision to retire. Davis attributed her decision partly to the death of her husband, Jim, approximately two years earlier, stating that she had lost enthusiasm for operating the establishment. She also announced plans to return to her native Texas to care for her aging parents.

Following its closure, the property was sold and converted into a bed and breakfast, retaining its former brothel-themed accommodations.

=== New ownership and proposed reopening (2018–2026) ===
Nigel White acquired the property in 2018. The property continued operating as a bed and breakfast following the closure of the brothel.

In 2026, an application was filed with Nye County seeking authorization to resume licensed brothel operations at the Shady Lady.

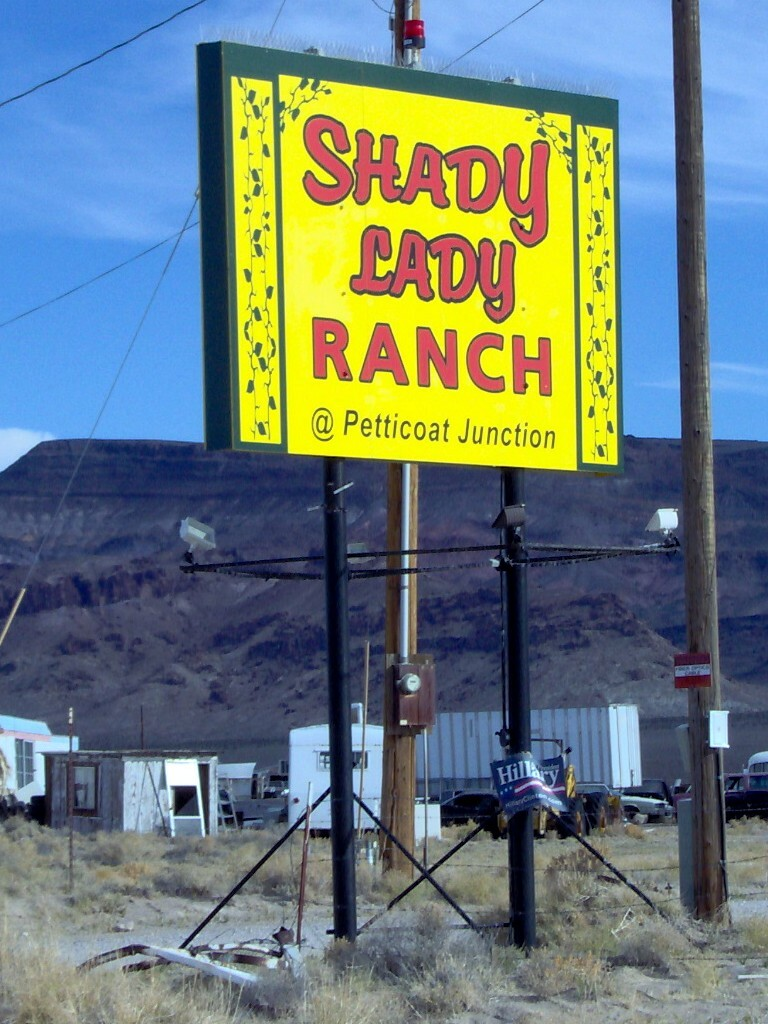
The sign for Shady Lady Ranch pre-2014

== See also ==
- Prostitution in Nevada
- List of brothels in Nevada
