= Gregory Hafen II =

American politician and utility executive

Greg Hafen

Minority Leader of the Nevada Assembly
- Incumbent
- Assumed office February 3, 2025
- Preceded by: P. K. O'Neill

Member of the Nevada Assembly from the 36th district
- Incumbent
- Assumed office December 2018
- Preceded by: Dennis Hof (elect)

Personal details
- Born: 1982 (age 43–44) Las Vegas, Nevada, U.S.
- Party: Republican
- Education: University of Nevada, Las Vegas (BS)

Gregory T. Hafen II is an American politician and utility executive who was appointed to the Nevada Assembly in December 2018, replacing Dennis Hof, who had been elected to the Assembly posthumously.

== Early life and education ==
Hafen was born and raised in Nevada and is a fifth-generation Nevadan and small business owner. Hafen earned a Bachelor of Science degree in business management from the University of Nevada, Las Vegas.

== Career ==
In 2006, he became a full-time member of the management of Pahrump Utility Company, which was founded in 1995 by Tim Hafen, father of Greg Hafen and grandfather of Gregory Hafen II. He was chairman of the Pahrump Regional Planning Commission and Pahrump Capital Improvement Advisory Committee, until he resigned to serve in the Nevada Assembly.

Gregory is the Chairman of the Desert View Hospital Board and a member of the Nevada Taxpayer Association. He previously chaired the Pahrump Regional Planning Commission, Pahrump Capital Improvement Advisory Committee, chaired the Pahrump Ground Water Management Plan Advisory Committee and has participated in developing numerous Nye County Ordinances and Nye County comprehensive plans.

In 2018, brothel owner and former Libertarian Dennis Hof had unseated Republican incumbent James Oscarson in the Republican primary election for the 36th Assembly district. Hof, running as the Libertarian nominee, had previously lost the 2016 general election to Oscarson. When Hof died on October 16, his name remained on the ballot, and he was elected posthumously. Nevada law stipulates that the county commissions of the counties which the district encompasses are to choose a successor from applicants of the previous incumbent's political party. 19 people applied for Hof's seat, and the commissions of all three counties selected Hafen. Lincoln County had three votes, Clark County had 30 votes, and Nye had 67 votes, reflecting the composition of the 36th district. Allegations were made by one commissioner that supporters of a rival candidate had threatened him, and there was some opposition to his election, citing his lack of political experience and youth (he was 35 as of December 5, 2018.)

Hafen was elected as minority leader for the 2025 legislative session.

=== 2020 election ===
He defeated chiropractor Joseph Bradley in the June 2020 Republican primary, with 4,851 votes (54.9%) to Bradley's 3,990 (45.1%), and was unopposed in the November 2020 general election.

Nevada Assembly
Preceded by P. K. O'Neill	Minority Leader of the Nevada Assembly; 2025–present	Incumbent
