= James Oscarson =

American politician (born 1957)

Member of the Nevada Assembly from the 36th district
- In office February 4, 2013 – November 7, 2018
- Preceded by: Ed Goedhart
- Succeeded by: Dennis Hof (never took office); Gregory Hafen

Personal details
- Born: 1957 (age 68–69) Ogden, Utah, U.S.
- Party: Republican
- Website: jamesoscarson.com

James Oscarson (born in 1957 in Ogden, Utah) is an American politician. A member of the Republican Party, he was a member of the Nevada Assembly from February 4, 2013 to November 7, 2018, representing District 36.

== Education ==
Oscarson attended the Clark County Community College.

== Elections ==
- 2012 When Republican Assemblyman Ed Goedhart retired and left the District 36 seat open, Oscarson won the four-way June 12, 2012 Republican Primary with 1,618 votes (41.34%), and won the November 6, 2012 General election with 14,539 votes (64.45%) against Democratic nominee Anthony Wernicke. Oscarson lost the June 12, 2018 Republican primary election to Dennis Hof, who died before the general election.
