= Heidi Swank =

American politician

Member of the Nevada Assembly from the 16th district
- In office February 4, 2013 – November 4, 2020
- Preceded by: John Oceguera
- Succeeded by: Cecelia González

Personal details
- Born: 1968 (age 57–58) Prescott, Wisconsin, U.S.
- Party: Democratic
- Education: Hamline University; Northwestern University
- Website: heidiswank.com

Heidi Ann Swank (born 1968 in Prescott, Wisconsin) is an American politician who served as a Democratic member of the Nevada Assembly, who represented 16th district from February 4, 2013, to November 4, 2020.

== Education ==
Swank graduated from Prescott High School and earned her BA from Hamline University. She earned her MA and Ph.D. from Northwestern University.

== Elections ==
When Democratic Assemblyman John Oceguera ran for the United States House of Representatives and left the District 16 seat open, Swank won the three-way June 12, 2012 Democratic primary and won the November 6, 2012 general election with 9,649 votes (71.43%) against Republican nominee Ben Boarman.
