= Olivia Diaz =

American politician (born 1978)

Member of the Las Vegas City Council from Ward 3
- Incumbent
- Assumed office 2019
- Preceded by: Bob Coffin

Member of the Nevada Assembly from the 11th district
- In office November 3, 2010 – December 3, 2018
- Preceded by: Ruben Kihuen
- Succeeded by: Bea Duran

Personal details
- Born: 1978 (age 47–48) Las Vegas, Nevada
- Party: Democratic
- Education: University of Nevada, Las Vegas; Nova Southeastern University
- Website: oliviafornevada.com

Olivia Diaz (born 1978 in Las Vegas, Nevada) is an American elementary school teacher and politician who served as a Democratic member of the Nevada Assembly from 2011 until 2018 representing District 11. Diaz is a member of the National Hispanic Caucus of State Legislators.

== Education ==
Diaz earned her BA in English from the University of Nevada, Las Vegas and her MS in bilingual education from Nova Southeastern University.

== Elections ==
- 2012 Diaz was elected unopposed for both the June 12, 2012 Democratic Primary and the November 6, 2012 general election, winning with 8,145 votes.
- 2010 When Democratic Assemblyman Ruben Kihuen ran for Nevada Senate and left the District 11 seat open, Diaz won the three-way June 8, 2010 Democratic Primary with 781 votes (83.44%), and won the November 2, 2010 general election with 3,162 votes (80.95%) against Republican nominee Von Brewer.

On December 3, 2018. Diaz announced her intention to resign and seek election to Las Vegas City Council Ward 3. Bea Duran of the Culinary Workers Union was appointed to fill her place.
