= Crystal, Nye County, Nevada =

Unincorporated community in Nye County, Nevada, United States

Coordinates: 36°29′30″N 116°10′03″W

Crystal
- Unincorporated community
- Interactive map of Crystal
- Country: United States
- State: Nevada
- County: Nye County

Crystal is an unincorporated community in Nye County, Nevada, United States. The community is located about 80 miles (130 km) from Las Vegas. It is on a paved road that exits from State Route 160. Elevation: 2390 feet. As of late 2005, Crystal had two brothels, the Cherry Patch Ranch and Mabel's Ranch, and the Brothel Art Museum.

In November 2005, former madam Heidi Fleiss said she intended to partner with a brothel owner in order to start a brothel with male prostitutes catering exclusively to female customers. In 2009, however, she announced that she had abandoned those plans.
