= Dennis Hof =

American businessman and politician (1946–2018)

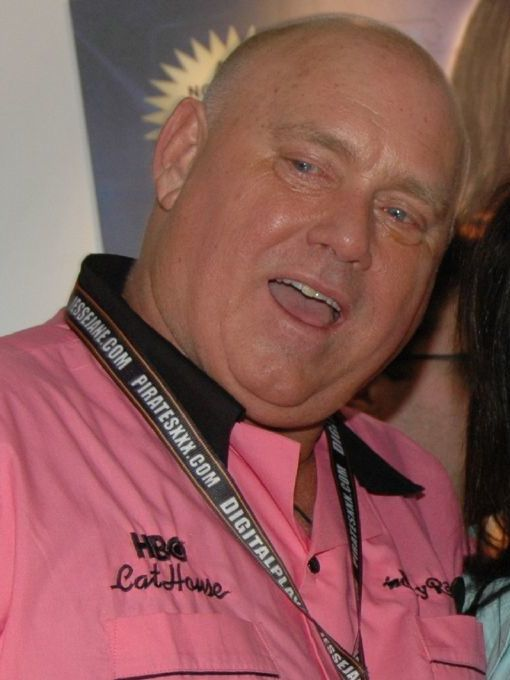
- Hof in 2006

Member-elect of the Nevada Assembly from the 36th district
- In office Died before taking office
- Preceded by: James Oscarson
- Succeeded by: Gregory Hafen II

Personal details
- Born: October 14, 1946 Phoenix, Arizona, U.S.
- Died: October 16, 2018 (aged 72) Crystal, Nevada, U.S.
- Party: Republican (2016–18)
- Other political affiliations: Libertarian (2015–16)
- Domestic partner: Heidi Fleiss (2009–2018)
- Children: 2
- Occupation: Entrepreneur; brothel owner; television personality

Dennis Allan Hof (October 14, 1946 – October 16, 2018) was an American businessman and politician. He owned seven legal brothels in Nevada, most notably the Moonlite Bunny Ranch. Hof was also a Republican candidate in 2018 for the Nevada Assembly, to which he was posthumously elected less than one month after his death.

== Career ==
Before entering into the brothel business, Hof owned gas stations, first in Arizona and later in Nevada.

=== Bunny Ranch brothel ===
Hof purchased and remodeled The Moonlite Bunny Ranch in 1992, a brothel that had been founded in 1955; he then purchased a second brothel, Kitty's, and renamed it The Love Ranch North. Hof later purchased two additional brothels from longtime Nye County brothel proprietor Joe Richards: the Cherry Patch in Crystal, Nevada, renamed the Love Ranch Vegas, and the Cherry Patch II in Amargosa Valley, Nevada, renamed the Alien Cathouse. On September 8, 2018, it was announced that the Alien Cathouse had been sold to business owner Raman Sharma.

Despite Nevada laws banning brothel advertising, Hof maintained a high profile to create publicity for his brothels. He was the president of the Nevada Brothel Owners' Association and its lobbyist; the Bunny Ranch is the closest brothel to the state capital, Carson City.

Hof operated a website; the "working girls" are encouraged to cultivate online relationships with both potential and past clients. He often appeared on talk shows, including Oprah Winfrey, The Today Show, The View, Fox News, Howard Stern, Lex and Terry, and many others. Hof employed adult film stars, including Sunset Thomas with whom he also had a romantic relationship. He also gave free offers to soldiers returning from duty.

In early 2009, due to the recession, State Senator Bob Coffin (D) proposed legalizing prostitution statewide for tax purposes. Hof was prominently featured in a number of media reports saying he would expand into Las Vegas given the opportunity, and was looking at some closed casinos as property. However, the Nevada lawmakers chose not to consider the proposal of statewide legal prostitution during that legislative session.

=== Filmography ===
Hof and the Moonlite Bunny Ranch brothel were featured in the HBO series Cathouse, which ran from 2002 to 2014. Two documentary series followed: Cathouse: The Series premiered in 2005, and Cathouse 2: Back in the Saddle appeared in 2007. Hof appeared prominently throughout the various Cathouse episodes and specials, which gained notoriety for inviting viewers to watch the inner workings of a legal house of prostitution, as well as the life of a number of the working girls, borrowing reality television techniques, such as camera-only interviews and staged spontaneity.

Hof appears as himself in an "underground" mall shop called "Pro-Life Sex" in the 2014 indie film Alongside Night. In 1998, Hof was in the Hughes Brothers documentary American Pimp, where notably he was the only white man the brothers interviewed.

=== Public speaking and television appearances ===
Hof had speaking engagements at Oxford University and Trinity College, Dublin. The New Yorker ran an 11-page article by Rebecca Mead about him, entitled "American Pimp", in 2001.

Hof appeared on Walton and Johnson, Brand X with Russell Brand, Rover's Morning Glory, The Johnny Dare Morning Show, Todd and Tyler, American Pimp, The Tyra Banks Show, Lex and Terry, the Opie and Anthony Show, The Adam Carolla Show, The Howard Stern Show, The Mike Calta Show, Loveline with Stryker and Dr. Drew, Derek and Romaine, and on Dr. Phil, as well as giving a tour and interview to conservative pundit Sean Hannity on Hannity and Colmes.

== Legal issues ==
In 1999, Lyon County sheriff's deputy Brian Putzer filed a police report accusing Hof of death threats.

In 2016, a woman who had formerly worked for Hof, Jennifer O'Kane, publicly accused Hof of nonconsensual sexual contact, rape, sexual harassment, and having sex with his workers without a condom.

In December 2017, another former employee, Diana Grandmaison, reported a non-consensual sexual encounter with Hof to the same detective who had investigated the O'Kane case.

== Politics ==
Hof endorsed Ron Paul in the 2008 and 2012 presidential elections. He joined the Libertarian Party in 2015. In December 2016, he became a "Trump Republican".

In 2016 and 2018, Hof ran for the 36th district seat in the Nevada Assembly, the lower house of the state legislature – the first time as a Libertarian and the second time as a Republican; he lost the first race to James Oscarson, but defeated him in the GOP primary in 2018. Hof prevailed in the primary after Nye County officials attempted to remove his campaign signs. However, in an emergency motion before the Federal District of Nevada, Hof prevailed in a First Amendment claim against the county. He was represented in that matter by First Amendment attorney Marc Randazza. After winning the primary, Hof styled himself as the "Trump from Pahrump."

Hof died October 16, 2018, less than a month before the 2018 general election. County commissioners from Lincoln, Nye and Clark counties conducted a weighted vote to determine Hof's replacement. The seat was given to Gregory Hafen II, general manager of a local utility company founded by his grandfather.

=== Electoral history ===
==== 2016 ====
2016 Nevada's 36th State Assembly general election results by county Map legend: Oscarson—80–90%; Oscarson—60–70%; Oscarson—50–60%

2016 Nevada's 36th State Assembly district election
Party	Candidate	Votes	%
Republican	James Oscarson (incumbent)	16,531	60.8
Libertarian	Dennis Hof	10,675	39.2
Total votes		27,206	100

==== 2018 ====
2018 Nevada's 36th State Assembly district Republican primary results by county
Map legend
- Hof—40–50%
- Oscarson—50–60%

2018 Nevada's 36th State Assembly district general election results by county
Map legend
- Hof (deceased)—70–80%
- Hof (deceased)—60–70%
- Hof (deceased)—50–60%

2018 Nevada's 36th State Assembly district Republican primary election
Party	Candidate	Votes	%
Republican	Dennis Hof	2,921	42.8
Republican	James Oscarson (incumbent)	2,489	36.5
Republican	Joseph J. Bradley	1,411	20.7
Total votes		6,821	100

2018 Nevada's 36th State Assembly district election
Party	Candidate	Votes	%
Republican	Dennis Hof (deceased)	17,179	63.1
Democratic	Lesia Romanov	10,058	36.9
Total votes		27,237	100

== Personal life ==
In Cathouse: The Musical, Hof revealed that he only dated prostitutes: "I don't date civilians [non-working girls]." The documentary series showed several of his relationships with employees, such as adult film star Sunset Thomas and Heidi Fleiss. Hof was a close friend of Fox News personality Tucker Carlson. He once stated that he communicated with Carson Daly to give him ideas for his show.

=== Death ===
Hof died in his sleep at his Love Ranch South in Crystal, Nevada, on October 16, 2018, following a party for his 72nd birthday that had been attended by Joe Arpaio, Heidi Fleiss, Grover Norquist, and Ron Jeremy, the last of whom found Hof unresponsive. Police did not suspect foul play at the time of his death, and no one who was with him the night before noticed any signs of ill-health. Hof's legislature campaign manager Chuck Muth said that Hof was "having the time of his life" that night. It was concluded that he died from a heart attack caused by atherosclerosis and hypertensive heart disease.

== See also ==
- Prostitution in Nevada
