= Dennis Hof's Love Ranch =

Legal brothel in Crystal, Nevada

- Love Ranch South; Love Ranch Las Vegas
- Location in Nevada
- Former names: Cherry Patch Ranch
- Location: Crystal, Nye County, Nevada
- Coordinates: 36.48329°N 116.15724°W

Website
- loveranch.net

Dennis Hof's Love Ranch, known as the Cherry Patch Ranch prior to 2010, is one of two brothels in Crystal, Nevada. It is also referred to as the Love Ranch South or Love Ranch Las Vegas due to its proximity to Las Vegas.

Both brothels in Crystal were owned by Maynard "Joe" Richards. In 2010, Richards sold both to Dennis Hof, who said Heidi Fleiss would be a consultant.

The license for the brothel was suspended in February 2018 for alleged unauthorized structural changes and fire and safety violations and then closed down by the county again on August 8, 2018, for late payment of fees.

On August 27, 2018, Judge Richard Boulware ruled that Dennis Hof may re-open Love Ranch Vegas as of August 28, 2018, stating that other brothels did not have their licenses revoked when they were late renewing.

== Incidents ==
=== Lamar Odom ===
On October 13, 2015, professional basketball player Lamar Odom was hospitalized after being discovered unconscious at the Love Ranch. Odom visited the ranch seeking the company of Ryder Cherry and Madison Montag.

=== Death of owner ===
On October 16, 2018, Dennis Hof, the owner of the Love Ranch property, was found dead at the Love Ranch following a party for his 72nd birthday that had been attended by Flavor Flav, Joe Arpaio, Grover Norquist and Ron Jeremy, the last of whom found Hof unresponsive. Police did not suspect foul play at the time of his death.

== See also ==
- The Love Ranch
- Prostitution in Nevada
- List of brothels in Nevada
