= Bob Coffin =

American politician

Ward 3 Councilman, Las Vegas City Council
- In office 2011–2019
- Preceded by: Gary Reese
- Succeeded by: Olivia Diaz

Member of the Nevada Senate from the Clark 10 district
- In office 2002–2010
- Preceded by: New District
- Succeeded by: Ruben Kihuen

Member of the Nevada Senate from the Clark 3 (Dual-Member District) district
- In office 1986–2002 Serving with John Vergiels (1986-1992); Sue Lowden (1992-1996); Valerie Wiener (1996-2002)
- Preceded by: Helen A. Foley
- Succeeded by: Dual-Member District dissolved, Single-Member District 10 created

Member of the Nevada Assembly from the Clark 9 district
- In office 1982–1986
- Preceded by: Helen A. Foley
- Succeeded by: Eileen B. Brookman

Personal details
- Born: October 7, 1942 (age 83) Anaheim, California, U.S.
- Party: Democratic
- Spouse: Mary Coffin
- Children: 3
- Profession: Business owner

James Robert Coffin (born October 7, 1942 in Anaheim, California) is an American politician.

== Early life and personal life ==
He was born on October 7, 1942 in Anaheim, California. He attended Bishop Gorman High School, then attended University of Nevada, Las Vegas, graduating with a BS in Accounting/Business Administration. He was in the United States Army Reserve in 1962.

== Career ==
From 1973 to 1974, he was president of the Nevada Golf Association. In 1970, he was the Nevada Amateur Golf Champion. From 1977 to 1978, he was a national committeeman of the Young Democrats of Nevada.

He was a member of the Nevada Assembly from 1983 through 1986. He was a Democratic member of the Nevada Senate, representing Clark County District 10, from 1987 until 2011.

In 1990, he worked as an international observer at the Nicaraguan elections. In 1999, his profile on the Nevada Legislature website described him as an insurance broker and antiquarian book dealer, alongside his role as a legislator.

=== Las Vegas council (2011-2019) ===
He was a Las Vegas city councilman, representing the city's east side in Ward 3 from 2011 to 2019. In 2018, he supported a measure to request to increase taxes to support housing for homeless in the city. He later expressed frustration when the measure didn't pass. In May 2019, he voted in favor of a measure which legalized cannabis lounges in the Las Vegas valley. In 2019, he announced he would be retiring from the city council. According to Coffin, he decided not to run for another term due to lingering back issues.

== Personal life ==
Coffin is Mexican American. He and his wife Mary have two children. He also has a son from his first marriage.
