= Sheri's Ranch =

Brothel near Las Vegas

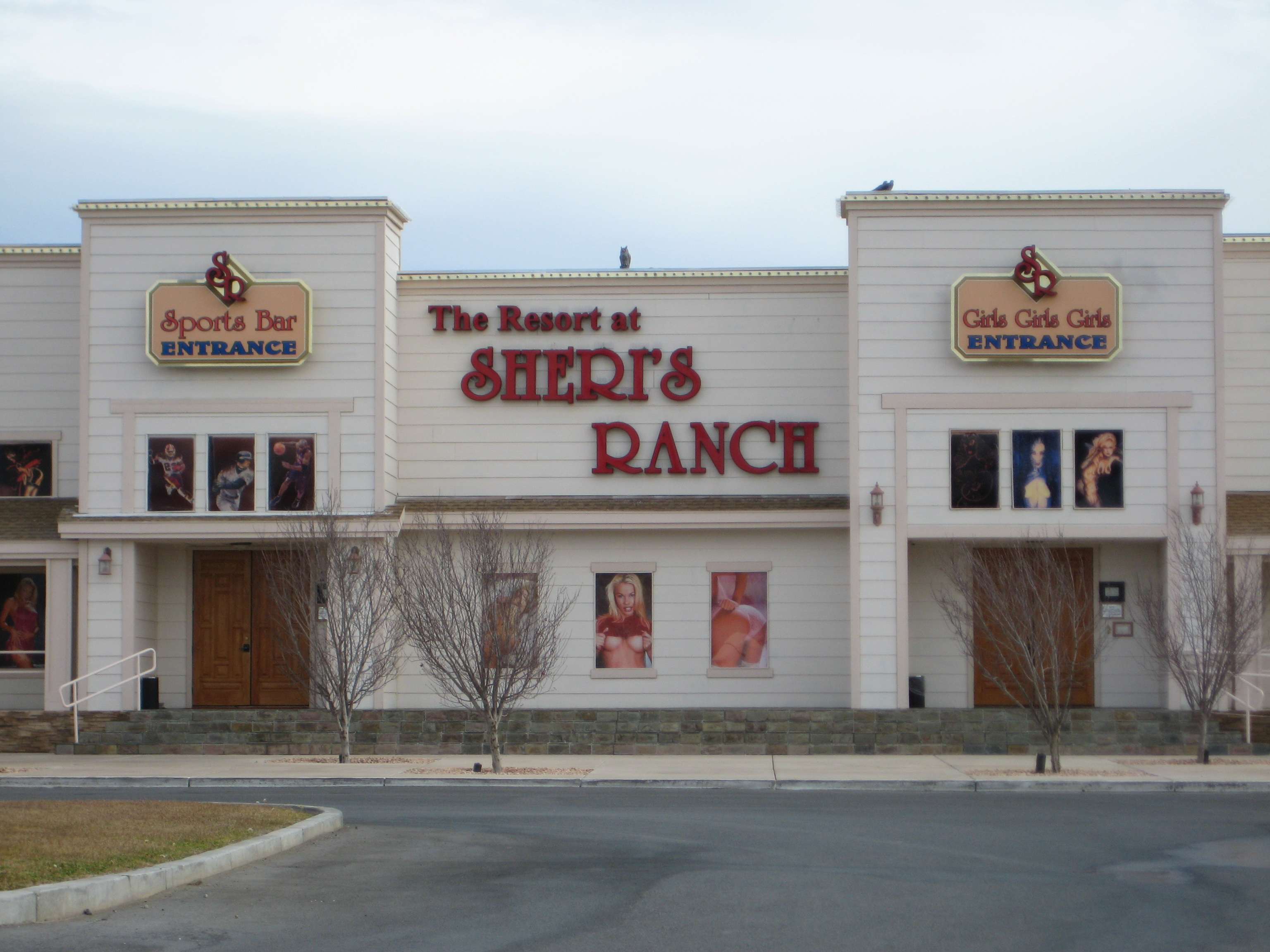
- Sheri's Ranch in 2008

- Location in Nevada
- Location: Pahrump, Nevada
- Coordinates: 36°04′14.65″N 115°57′23.85″W
- Owner: Chuck Lee

Website
- www.sherisranch.com

Sheri's Ranch is a legal brothel in Pahrump, Nevada. Unlike other brothels in the state, it styles itself as a resort, with upscale rooms and furnishings, sports bar, tennis courts, a spa and outdoor swimming pool.

In 2026, in what would be the first unionization of brothel workers in the US, sex workers at Sheri's Ranch attempted to unionize after being required to give up intellectual property rights. The brothel fired three of the workers involved.

== Ownership and business ==
In January 2001, the business was purchased by Chuck Lee, a retired Chicago homicide detective of 20 years, former owner of an AT&T retail store, and car dealership owner from Las Vegas, Nevada.

In 2005, Sheri's Ranch sought local zoning changes in Pahrump to build a 700-plus home 330 acres (130 ha) residential subdivision known as Mountain Shadows Resort.

== Community involvement ==
In 2004, the brothel raised $7,000 towards a senior citizens center so that they could still receive their "Meals on Wheels".

== Labor organizing ==
In 2026, sex workers at Sheri's Ranch attempted to unionize with the Communications Workers of America after being presented with new contracts requiring that they give up all intellectual property rights to content created while employed there. Three workers involved in the union drive were fired by the brothel. If successful, it would be the first unionization of brothel workers in the US. In response, Alice Little wrote an op-ed for the Nevada Independent entitled "As a sex worker, I'm better off as an entrepreneur — not an employee," expressing her desire to remain an independent contractor.

== Literature ==
Author Lora Shaner, a former madam of the brothel, wrote a 1998 book about her experiences, Madam: Chronicles of a Nevada Cathouse, reissued and extended in 2001 as Madam: Inside a Nevada Brothel.

== Media mentions ==
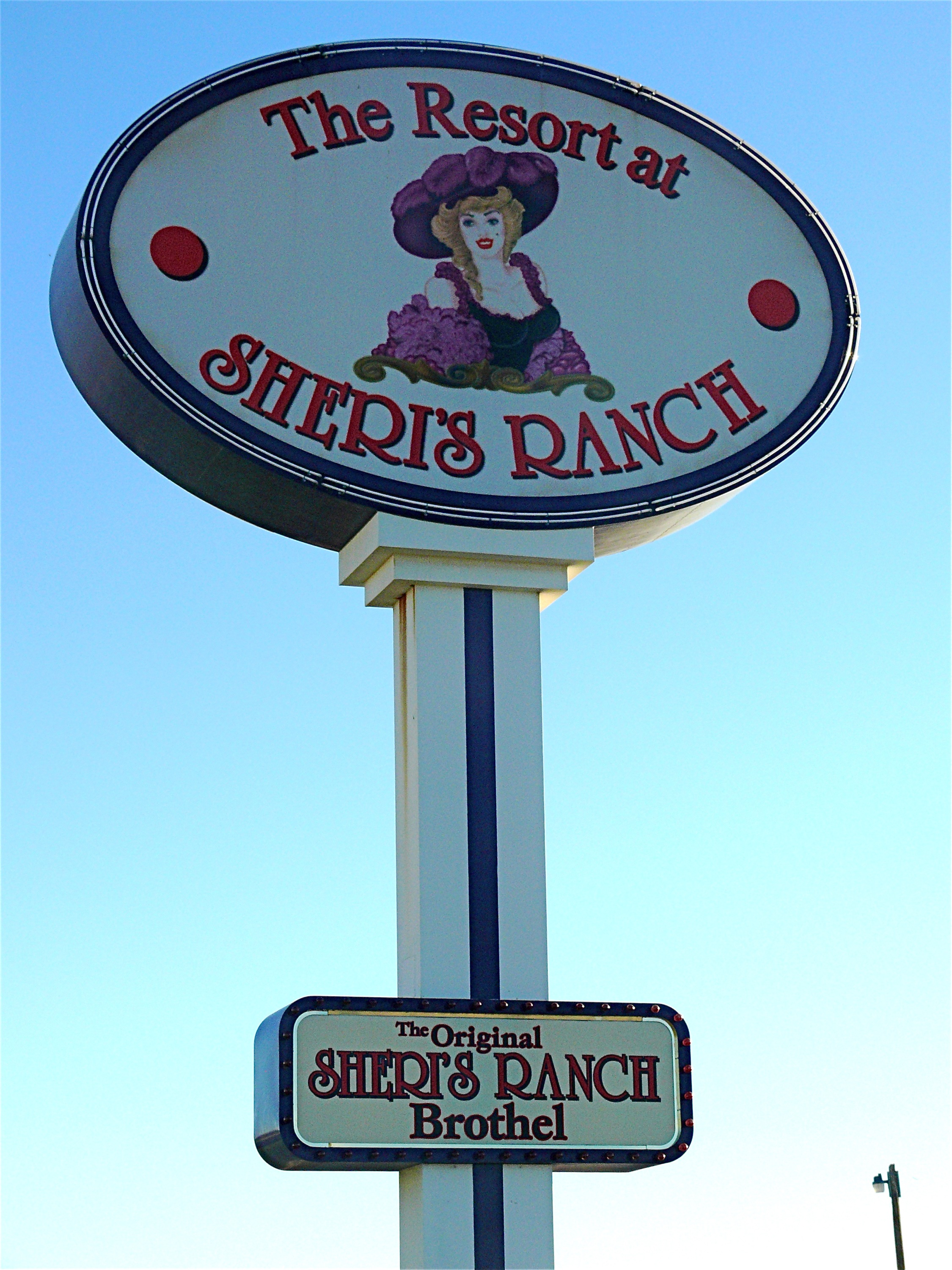
"The Resort at Sheri's Ranch"

=== Television and film ===
Sheri's Ranch has appeared in several television programs and documentaries. It was featured in the BBC series Panorama in an episode on safe sex and the prevention of HIV and other STIs among Nevada brothel sex workers. On the A&E show Gene Simmons Family Jewels, Gene Simmons interviewed Scarlett and Tawny Brie there while researching an upcoming novel. It also appeared in the CMT documentary Morgan Spurlock Presents Freedom! The Movie, in the Vice Media documentary "The Vice Guide to Vegas Pt 1", and in the Showtime series Ray Donovan in the episode "Las Vegas."

=== Print and online media ===
The brothel was the subject of a Business Insider article by Dylan Love and of a 2015 The Guardian piece by Dan Hernandez on the state of the Nevada brothel industry.

=== Podcasts ===
An episode of the Vital Vegas Podcast included a room-by-room walk-through of the property and interviews with a madam and a sex worker. The podcast Let Me Tell You About devoted an hour-long episode to the brothel.

== Awards ==
Sheri's Ranch won CWMC's Brothel of the Year award in 2011 and 2012.

== See also ==
- Prostitution in Nevada
- List of brothels in Nevada
