= Chicken Ranch (Nevada) =

Legal brothel near Pahrump, Nevada

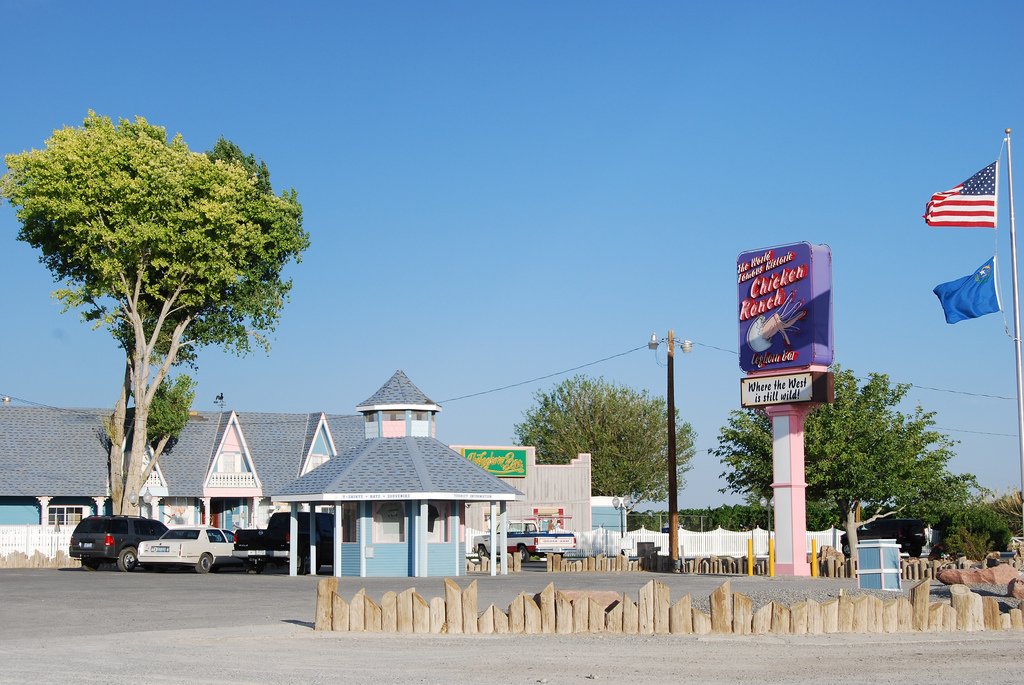
- Chicken Ranch, June 2007

- Location in Nevada
- Address: 10511 Homestead Road
- Location: Pahrump, Nevada
- Coordinates: 36°04′24.7″N 115°57′23.45″W
- Capacity: 14 rooms

Construction
- Opened: 1976

Website
- chickenranchbrothel.com

The Chicken Ranch is a legal, licensed brothel located about 60 miles (97 km) west of Las Vegas near the town of Pahrump, in Nye County, at 10511 Homestead Road. The 17-bed brothel sits on 40 acres (16 ha) of land. A separate building, connected to the main house by a breezeway, contains three extensively-decorated themed "bungalows" catering to those customers wishing a more luxurious experience.

Approximately 60 courtesans call the Chicken Ranch "home" with around 12 to 15 women living and working there at any time. The women often stay for at least two weeks at a time.

The ladies are independent contractors and set their own prices and menu of services. Due to Nye County ordinances, solicitation cannot be done outside of the house of the brothel.

The ranch used to house a collection of memorabilia from the original Chicken Ranch which was located outside of La Grange, Texas.

The ranch also houses the Leghorn Bar. The bar has a separate entrance for visitors not wishing to enter the brothel parlor.

== History ==
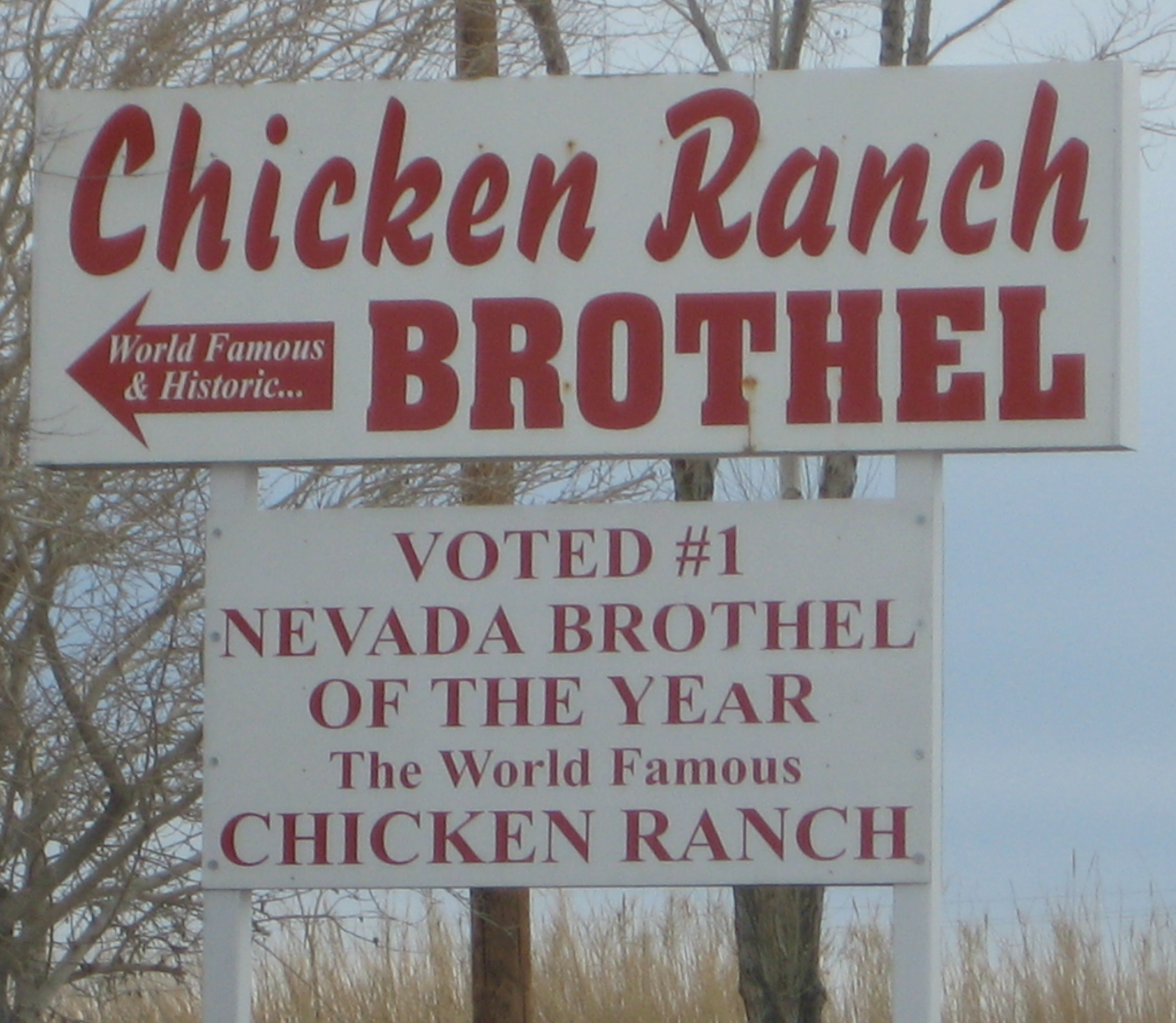
Roadside billboard for the Chicken Ranch

Walter Plankinton opened the Nevada Chicken Ranch in 1976, as close to Las Vegas as legally possible. He encountered strong opposition from local law enforcement and other brothel owners. It remains the closest brothel to Las Vegas.

The initial location of the Chicken Ranch was inside the town limits of Pahrump, where prostitution was illegal. Plankinton was arrested and found guilty of violating the town's laws. He moved the brothel to a new location within Nye County, but outside of town limits. After lengthy appeals he served 60 days in jail in 1981.

Nye County did not require brothels to be licensed in 1976, and three other brothels operated legally in the county at the time. Nevertheless, officials circulated a petition opposing the Chicken Ranch and then tried to close it down as a "public nuisance per se". The resulting court case reached the Nevada Supreme Court, which ruled in Plankinton's favor in 1978.

In 1978, the Chicken Ranch was burned to the ground, allegedly by arsonists. Plankinton reopened with a new set of trailers five days later.

In 1982, Plankinton sold the Chicken Ranch for $1,250,000 to Kenneth Green, a San Francisco businessman, and Russel Reade, an ex-teacher. Reade, who had contributed $25,000 towards the purchase, became the manager. Around 15 women were working at the ranch at that time.

Chicken Ranch Airport was an airstrip on premises which allowed small planes to land at the brothel; it is now closed.

On February 8, 2006, the ranch accepted a purchase offer for $5.2 million.

== See also ==
- List of brothels in Nevada
- Prostitution in Nevada
