= Mound House, Nevada =

Unincorporated community in Nevada, US

- Unincorporated community
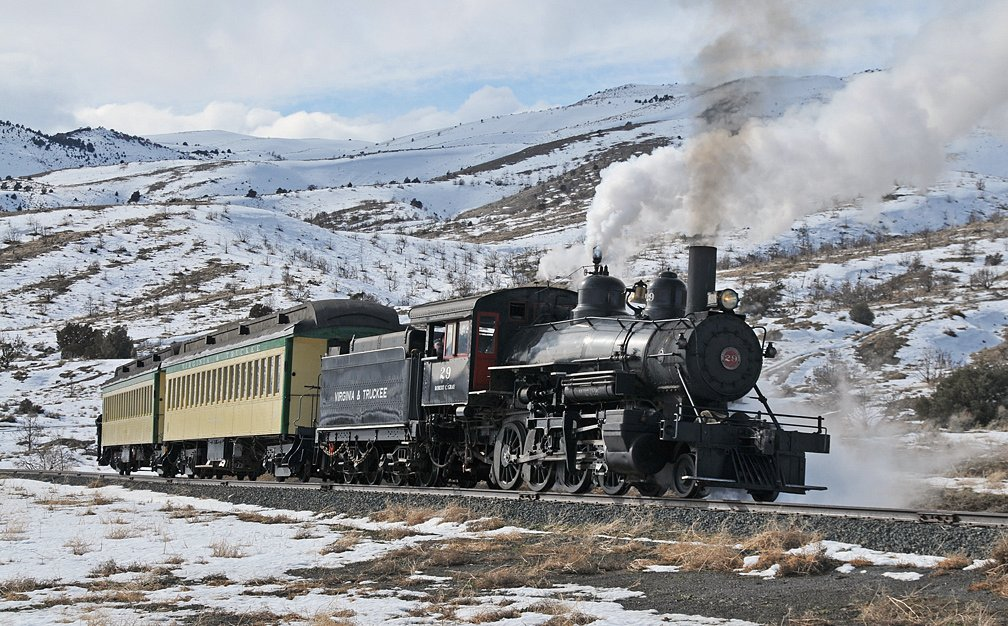
- Virginia and Truckee Railroad excursion train climbing out of Mound House, March 2011.

- Location within Nevada Location within the United States
- Coordinates: 39°13′02″N 119°40′31″W
- Country: United States
- State: Nevada
- County: Lyon
- Elevation: 4,974 ft (1,516 m)
- Time zone: UTC-8 (Pacific (PST))
  - Summer (DST): UTC-7 (PDT)
- GNIS feature ID: 856321

Nevada Historical Marker
- Reference no.: 61

Mound House is a small unincorporated community in Lyon County, Nevada on U.S. Route 50 that is situated between Nevada's capital, Carson City, and Dayton. Its elevation is 4,974 feet (1,516 m). It is in Lyon County, one of eight Nevada counties that allow for legalized prostitution, and is home to four brothels.

== History ==
Situated adjacent to Carson City, the community of Mound House lies just east of the county line and is the first community in Lyon County as one travels east on U.S. Route 50 from Carson City. Mound House came into being as a community in the 19th century as settlers traveled west toward California along the Carson River route. The famed Pony Express (1860–1861) once had a stop here, now commemorated by a Historical Marker located on the grounds of the Moonlite BunnyRanch legal brothel.

Mound House grew in importance with the Comstock silver strike and the famed Virginia and Truckee Railroad (V&T) passed through the community. It grew in population during the mining boom with a railroad station (1871) and post office (1877) as the center of the community. Upon construction of the narrow gauge Carson and Colorado Railway (C&C) in 1880, Mound House became an important multi-gauge transfer depot for both freight and passengers. The original community suffered the fate of many of the Comstock tied communities, population and commerce fading with the demise of the silver boom. Completion of the Hazen branch (1905) of the Southern Pacific Railroad, which had purchased the C&C the previous year, allowed traffic bound for the transcontinental railroad to bypass the V&T entirely, and Mound House suffered as a result.

At the turn of the 20th century, there were two gypsum operations near Mound House: the Regan mill to the east and the Adams operation to the north.

By 1923, the Regan mill had not been in operation for several years.

In about 1904, former Nevada Governor Jewett W. Adams acquired the northern gypsum deposit. The gypsum was transported via the SPRR and by large carts to the old Mexican mill for refining in Empire City. Adams named his product "Empire" plaster. Empire brand plaster was used in the rebuilding of San Francisco after the 1906 San Francisco earthquake. In 1907 Adams, J.C. Curry and Nathaniel Bell formed Nevada Gypsum Co., which started construction of a new mill and tramway just north of Mound House on the V&T. Future Nevada Governor Emmet D. Boyle designed and supervised the construction of the new mill. In February 1909, the mill started shipping product. In 1912, Nevada Gypsum Co. sold its holdings to Pacific Portland Cement Company, which operated the mine and mill until 1924. In 1924, Pacific Portland Cement Company moved its operations to Empire, Nevada. The dismantling of the Mound House mill was completed by September 1924.

Gypsum mining and a mill still operate today in the community. However, the community's railroads eventually fell victim to economic forces, with the C&C abandoning its line between Mound House and Fort Churchill in 1934, and the V&T closing its Carson City-Virginia City line in 1938. The rails were removed for scrap in 1941.

With the reconstruction of the Virginia & Truckee Railway underway since the mid-1970s, Mound House residents and visitors can now once again hear the sound of trains nearby. However, the 2009 version of the V&T had to deviate from the historical alignment down what is now Red Rock Road and Highland Drive due to the development that had taken place over the last 68 years. As a result, the new trains will not pass through the site of the original Mound House depot and yards.

Significant industrial enterprises, small commercial businesses, mining, and several residential areas make up the community of Mound House today.

Preceded by Hawthorne (Present Mineral County Seat—Former Esmeralda County Seat)	Nevada Historical Markers; 61	Succeeded by Truckee River – West
