= Moonlite Bunny Ranch =

Brothel in Nevada, United States

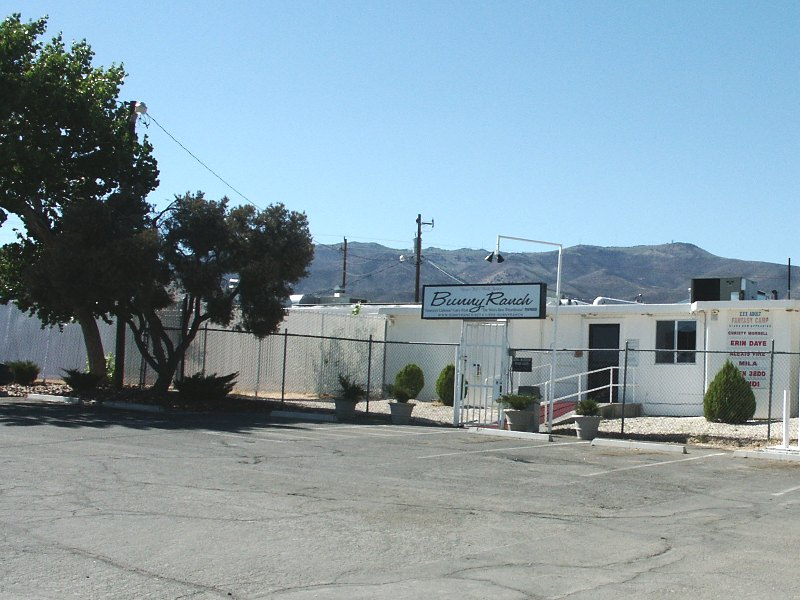
- The Moonlite Bunny Ranch in 2006

- Location in Nevada
- Former names: Moonlight Ranch
- Address: 69 Moonlight Road, Mound House, Nevada, US
- Coordinates: 39°13′07″N 119°40′15″W

Construction
- Opened: 1955

Website
- bunnyranch.com

Moonlite Bunny Ranch is a legal, licensed brothel in Mound House, Nevada, United States, 6 miles (10 km) east of Carson City. First opened in 1955, it came to national attention under Dennis Hof, who owned the brothel from 1992 until his death in 2018.

== History ==
A sign found outside Moonlite Bunny Ranch

The brothel first opened in 1955 as the Moonlight Ranch. There is a historical marker on the premises, found just inside of the property's original main gate, as the ranch is located near a stop on the original Pony Express. It operated discreetly until 1971, when Nevada began regulation of houses of prostitution. Dennis Hof, a frequent customer, purchased the business in 1992 for $700,000 and invested another $500,000 in upgrading the facilities and décor.

Jesse Ventura, former professional wrestler and Governor of Minnesota, wrote in his 1999 autobiography I Ain't Got Time to Bleed that he visited the Bunny Ranch in the 1970s, had sex there, and received $10 in return for a belt he had made of empty rifle shell casings.

In July 2003, Mötley Crüe singer Vince Neil was charged with battery after a sex worker at the ranch alleged that he grabbed her around the throat and threw her against a wall.

In February 2009, a new main entrance to the Moonlite Bunny Ranch with direct access to U.S. 50 opened to traffic. Constructed by the Nevada Department of Transportation as a business access road, the new street was officially named Bunnyranch Boulevard by Lyon County.

Dennis Hof subsequently purchased another nearby brothel, then known as Madame Kitty's Fantasy Ranch, located about one mile (1.6 km) away. To better capitalize on his brand name, he rechristened it Bunny Ranch Two in 2004. Hof renamed it again in June 2008 as The Love Ranch.

In early 2009, due to the recession, State Senator Bob Coffin (D) proposed legalizing prostitution statewide for tax purposes. Hof was prominently featured in a number of media reports saying he would expand into Las Vegas given the opportunity. However, the Nevada lawmakers refused to consider the proposal of statewide legal prostitution during that legislative session.

In May 2017, a man backed a stolen semi-trailer truck through the front door of the brothel, causing extensive damage but no injuries.

Hof died on October 16, 2018. As of February 2020, company madam and financial officer Suzette Cole runs the brothel as trustee of Hof's estate.

The State of Nevada shut down all brothels in March 2020 during the COVID-19 pandemic. Sex workers at the Bunny Ranch sued Governor Steve Sisolak in October, asking that the brothel be reopened or that remote work be allowed. At least one suit was dismissed on the grounds that workers as contractors have no standing, and only brothel owners could file a petition.

== In the media ==
The Moonlite Bunny Ranch was featured on HBO's America Undercover show specials, Cathouse (2002), and Cathouse 2: Back in the Saddle (2003). This led to Cathouse: The Series, airing in two seasons in 2005 and 2007. "Air Force Amy" was featured in HBO's documentaries Cathouse, Cathouse 2, and Cathouse: The Series about the ranch. She was called "the all-time top earner" and "the master of the game". The "She's Got Game" episode (2005) included a personal profile of her. She also appeared in the 2004 BBC television program The Brothel on the same subject and the 2005 documentary Pornstar Pets. The ranch was also featured as a supposedly "haunted house" in an episode of Proof Positive and is frequently mentioned on the Howard Stern Show, usually to announce that another porn star has started to work there.

In 2008, Moonlite Bunny Ranch sex worker Brooke Taylor was featured in the web series "Who's Sleeping with Your Husband", speaking candidly about the reasons she believes men visit brothels and revealing the most popular menu items.

== Virginity auction ==
In September 2008, a 22-year-old woman calling herself Natalie Dylan announced on The Howard Stern Show that she would auction off her virginity on the Bunny Ranch website and that the act would be consummated at the ranch. While Dylan's sister had worked at the Bunny Ranch two years prior, Dylan insisted her sibling had nothing to do with her decision, saying, "My sister definitely didn't pressure me into doing this". A recent women's studies graduate from Sacramento State, Dylan planned to use the money to finance graduate school and said, "I feel empowered because I am being pro-choice with my body." She retained the right to reject the winner of the auction and pick another bidder, claiming that several bids had exceeded $1 million. Dennis Hof was to receive half of the winning bid. A news report in May 2010 suggested that the episode may have been a hoax, although Hof insisted it was not. Hof later indicated the transaction was never consummated, stating, "It didn't work out, but she still made $250,000 out of the deal."

== See also ==
- Louis and the Brothel
- Prostitution in Nevada
- List of brothels in Nevada
