= Prostitution in Nevada =

Legality of brothel prostitution in Nevada by county Prostitution permitted, at least one active brothel Prostitution permitted, no active brothels Prostitution prohibited

Nevada is the only U.S. state where prostitution is legally permitted in some form. Prostitution is legal in 10 of Nevada's 17 counties, although only six allow it in every municipality. Six counties have at least one active brothel, which mainly operate in isolated, rural areas. The state's most populated counties, Clark (which contains Las Vegas) and Washoe (which contains Reno), are among those that do not permit prostitution. It is also illegal in Nevada's capital, Carson City, an independent city.

The vast majority of prostitution in Nevada takes place illegally in the metropolitan areas of Las Vegas and Reno. About 66 times more money is spent by customers on illegal prostitution in Nevada than in the regulated brothels.

== History ==
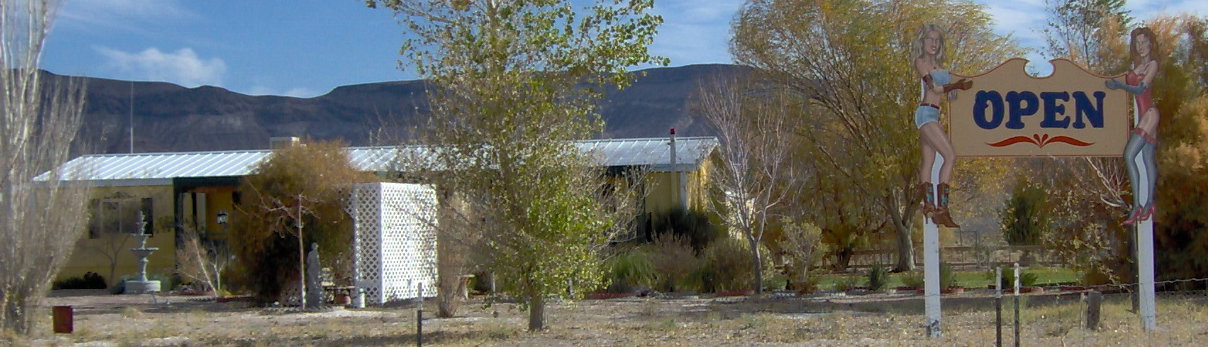
Shady Lady Ranch in Nye County, Nevada.

Prostitution has been present in Nevada since the early days of statehood. Nevada joined the Union in 1864, and although its population grew from 6,857 people in pre-statehood 1860 to over 40,000 in 1870, and the number of residents had fluctuated throughout the years, it was only in the mid-1930s that the population reached 100,000 people, and only in the mid-1950s that it reached 200,000 people. Nevada's population in the early decades consisted of considerably more men that women, given the history of mining in Nevada, with three quarters of the population being male at the 1870 census. Historically, Nevada's legislature considered prostitution a local issue, leaving it up to counties and cities to regulate, with only minimal regulation at state level, namely prohibiting brothels near schools or churches. In 1937, a law was enacted to require weekly health checks of all prostitutes. In 1942, President Franklin D. Roosevelt issued an order to suppress prostitution near military bases—affecting the red-light districts of Reno and Las Vegas. When this order was lifted in 1948, Reno officials tried to shut down a brothel as a public nuisance; this action was upheld by the Nevada Supreme Court in 1949. In 1951, both Reno and Las Vegas had closed their red-light districts as public nuisances, but brothels continued to exist throughout the state.

In 1971, Joe Conforte, owner of a brothel called Mustang Ranch, near Reno, in Storey County, convinced county officials to enact an ordinance which would provide for the licensing of brothels and prostitutes, thus avoiding the threat of being closed down as a public nuisance.

Officials in Las Vegas, afraid that Conforte would use the same technique to open a brothel nearby, convinced the legislature, in 1971, to enact legislation prohibiting the legalization of prostitution in counties with a population above a certain threshold, tailored to apply only to Clark County.

In 1977, county officials in Nye County tried to shut down Walter Plankinton's Chicken Ranch as a public nuisance; brothels did not have to be licensed in that county at the time, and several others were operating. Plankinton filed suit, claiming that the 1971 state law had implicitly removed the assumption that brothels are public nuisances per se. The Nevada Supreme Court agreed with this interpretation in 1978, and so the Chicken Ranch was allowed to operate. In another case, brothel owners in Lincoln County protested when the county outlawed prostitution in 1978, having issued licenses for seven years. The Nevada Supreme Court ruled, however, that the county had the right to do so.

A state law prohibiting the advertising of brothels in counties which have outlawed prostitution was enacted in 1979. It was promptly challenged on First Amendment grounds, but in 1981, the Nevada Supreme Court declared it to be constitutional. (Princess Sea Industries, one of the parties involved in the case, was Plankinton's company that owned the Chicken Ranch.) In July 2007, the law was overturned by a U.S. District judge as "overly broad", and advertising in Las Vegas started soon after. In March 2010, the district judge's decision was reversed back by a three-judge panel of the U.S. Ninth Circuit Court of Appeals. The ACLU appealed to the full Ninth Circuit Court in March 2010. It further appealed to the Supreme Court of the United States in 2011, but the Supreme Court refused to hear the appeal. The ban on brothels advertising therefore remains in force.

While brothels and prostitutes are subject to federal income tax and also pay local fees, Nevada has no state income tax, and brothels are exempt from the state entertainment tax and do not pay any other state taxes. In 2005, brothel owners lobbied to be taxed in order to increase the legitimacy of the business, but the legislature declined. Brothels pay taxes to their respective counties. Lyon County receives approximately $400,000 to $500,000 per year from these taxes.

In November 2005, former prostitute and madam Heidi Fleiss said that she would partner with brothel owner Joe Richards to turn Richards' existing Cherry Patch Ranch brothel in Crystal, Nye County, Nevada, into an establishment that would employ male prostitutes and cater exclusively to female customers, a first in Nevada. In 2009, however, she said that she had abandoned her plans to open such a brothel due to wishing to avoid having to "deal with all the nonsense in the sex business" and preferring to focus on renewable energy which would be "perfect for Nevada. That's where the money is. That's the wave of the future."

On December 11, 2009, the Nevada State Board of Health unanimously agreed to add urethral examinations to the guidelines, thus allowing male sex workers to be tested for sexually transmitted diseases.

== Legal situation ==
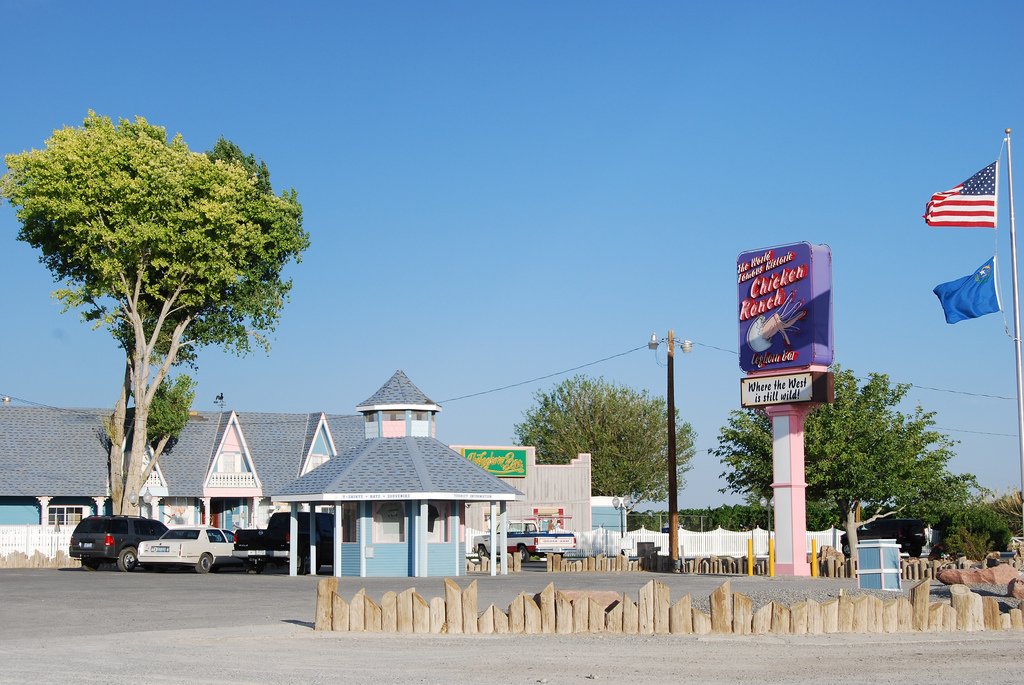
Chicken Ranch, June 2007

Under Nevada state law, any county with a population of up to 700,000, as of the last decennial census is allowed to license brothels if it so chooses. Incorporated towns and cities in counties that allow prostitution may regulate the trade further or prohibit it altogether.

Currently 6 out of Nevada's 17 counties have active brothels, all of which are rural counties. As of September 2023, there are 19 active legal brothels in the state.

State law prohibits prostitution in Clark County (which contains Las Vegas), and under county or municipal law in Carson City (an independent city), and these other counties: Douglas, Eureka, Lincoln, Pershing, and Washoe (which contains Reno). The other 10 Nevada counties permit licensed brothels in certain specified areas or cities. All 10 of these rural counties have had at least one legal brothel in operation subsequent to 1971, but many of these brothels were financially unsuccessful or ran afoul of State health regulations. As of 2016, only seven of these counties have active brothels, while the other three (Churchill County, Esmeralda County and Humboldt County) no longer do.

The precise licensing requirements vary by county. License fees for brothels range from an annual $100,000 in Storey County to an annual $200,000 in Lander County. Licensed prostitutes must be at least 21 years old, except in Storey County and Lyon County (where the minimum age is 18).

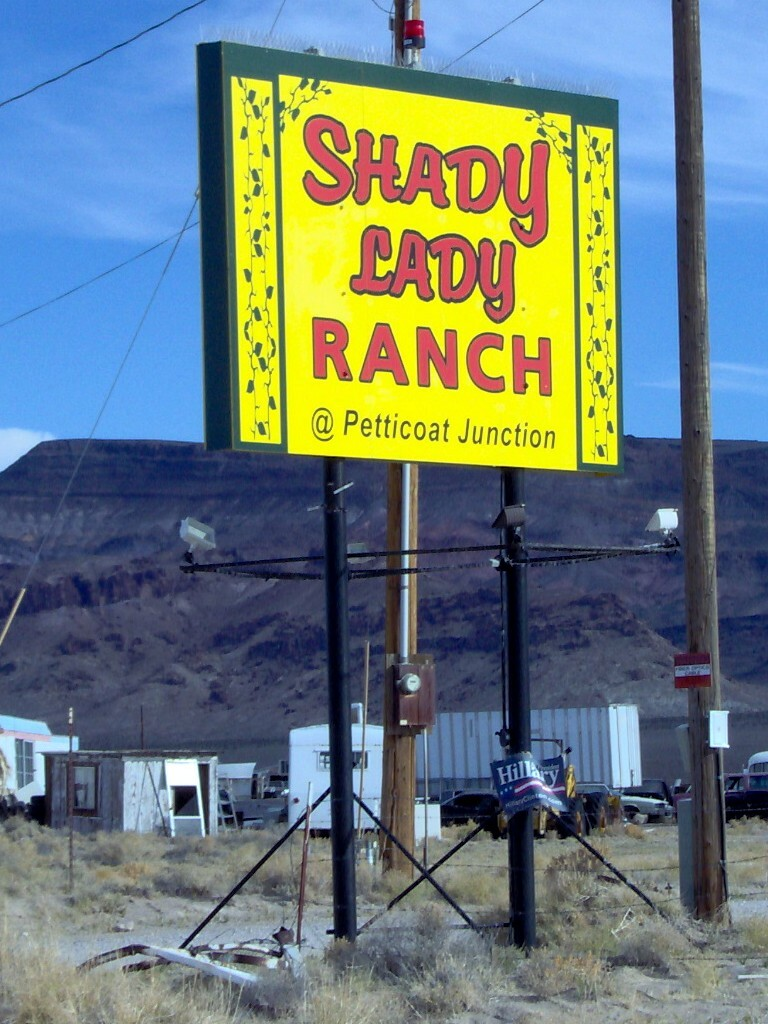
Shady Lady Ranch brothel sign in 2007. In 2014 it was converted to Shady Lady Bed and Breakfast.

The brothels and their employees must register with the county sheriff and receive regular medical checkups. Brothels have existed in Nevada since the old mining days of the 1800s and were first licensed in 1971. The legendary Mustang Ranch operated from 1971 through 1999, when it was forfeited to the federal government following a series of convictions for tax fraud, racketeering, and other crimes.

Nevada law requires that registered brothel prostitutes be tested weekly (by a cervical specimen) for gonorrhea and Chlamydia trachomatis, and monthly for HIV and syphilis; furthermore, condoms are mandatory for all oral sex and sexual intercourse. Brothel owners may be held liable if customers become infected with HIV after a prostitute has tested positive for the virus. Women work a legally mandated minimum of nine days for each work period.

Nevada has laws against engaging in prostitution outside of licensed brothels, against encouraging others to become prostitutes, and against living off the proceeds of a prostitute.

In June 2009, then-Nevada Governor Jim Gibbons signed the most stringent punishments nationwide for child prostitution and pandering. Assembly Bill 380, which allows for fines of $500,000 for those convicted of trafficking prostitutes younger than 14 and $100,000 for trafficking prostitutes ages 14 to 17. Both the House and the Senate unanimously approved the bill, which went into effect October 1, 2009.

=== Overview ===
==== State legislation ====
- Prostitution is only legal in licensed brothels.
- Brothels are prohibited in counties with more than 700,000 inhabitants.
- The use of condoms by prostitutes is mandatory.
- Prostitutes must be tested for STIs weekly/monthly.

==== County legislation ====
County	Prostitution legality	Legislation	Number of brothels (as of February 2018)	Notes
Carson City	No	County Code, Title 8, Chapter 8.04.110	0	
Churchill County	Yes	County Code, Title 5, Chapter 5.20	0	The last brothel license was surrendered in 2004. No licenses have been issued since.
Clark County	No	Nevada Statue NRS 244.345; County Code, Title 12, Chapter 12.08	0	
Douglas County	No	County Code, Title 9, Chapter 9.20	0	
Elko County	Prostitution only legal in the incorporated communities of Elko, Carlin, Wendover and Wells	County Code, Title 7, Chapter 1.6	Carlin: 2 Elko: 4 Wells: 2	
Esmeralda County	Yes	Ordinance 154	0	
Eureka County	No	County Code, Title 6, Chapter 60	0	
Humboldt County	Prostitution only legal in the incorporated community of Winnemucca, Last brothel closed in 2017, and demolished per outlined NRS Chapter 201 in effect since 2021. According to local county regulations, a brothel may not be declared to a specific zone, as it does not apply as stated in paragraph B, 2nd section of CC Title 5; Chapter 8.	County Code, Title 5, Chapter 5.08	0	
Lander County	Yes	County Code, Title 5, Chapter 5.16	Battle Mountain: 1	
Lincoln County	No	County Code, Title 7, Chapter 2	0	
Lyon County	Prostitution only legal in Mound House	County Code, Title 5, Chapter 3	Mound House: 4	No more than 4 brothel licenses may be issued.
Mineral County	Yes	County Code, Title 5, Chapter 5	Mina: 1	For the purposes of licensing, Mineral County is divided into 2 geographical areas: Mina district and Hawthorne district. Licenses are limited to no more than 2 in each area
Nye County	Yes	County Code, Title 9, Chapter 9.20	Amargosa Valley: 1 Crystal: 1 Pahrump: 2	No more than one brothel license can be issued for Amargosa Valley.
Pershing County	No	County Code, Title 9, Chapter 9.08	0	
Storey County	Yes	County Code, Title 5, Chapter 5.16	near Sparks: 1	
Washoe County	No	County Code, Chapter 50.238, 53.170.25	0	
White Pine County	Prostitution only legal in the incorporated city of Ely	County Code, Title 10, Chapter 10.36; Title 17, Chapter 17.60	Ely: 2	

== Legal brothels ==
Locations with active brothels in Nevada

As of February 2018, 21 legal brothels exist in the state employing about 200 women at any given time. In some locales, there exist multi-unit complexes of several separate brothels run by the same owner.

As of September 2023, only 19 legal brothels remain open in the state, located in just 6 rural counties.

Mandatory HIV testing began in 1986 and a mandatory condom law was passed in 1988. A study conducted in 1995 in two brothels found that condom use in the brothels was consistent and sexually transmitted diseases were accordingly absent. The study also found that few of the prostitutes used condoms in their private lives.

== Illegal prostitution ==
Illegal prostitution is the most common form of prostitution in Nevada; the offense is a misdemeanor. The cities of Las Vegas and Reno have worked to expand their tourism base by attracting families to the hotels and casinos. Accordingly, the state legislature has made prostitution illegal in Clark County, and law enforcement agencies have tried to eliminate the once-rampant street prostitution, enacting legislation against it in 1971. Nevertheless, prostitutes continue to work in casinos, where they wait in bars and attempt to make contact with potential clients. Of all the prostitution business in Nevada, only about 10% is legal, and 90% of illegal prostitution occurs in Las Vegas. The vast majority of prostitution in Nevada takes place illegally in the metropolitan areas of Las Vegas and Reno. Legal prostitution in Nevada grosses about $75 million per year while illegal prostitution in the Las Vegas area grosses about $5 billion per year. Some 300–400 prostitutes are arrested each month by the Las Vegas police.

Escort services offering sexual services euphemistically as 'entertainment' or 'companionship' are ubiquitous, with a reported 104 pages of a Las Vegas yellow pages directory devoted to "entertainers". Flyers are dispensed to tourists and others along the Las Vegas Strip by freelance workers. These flyers also graphically depict female 'personal' entertainers or escort services. Despite the attempt to make the Las Vegas Strip more family-friendly, such advertising for these services continues.

In 2009 Las Vegas was identified by the FBI as one of 14 cities in the U.S. with high rates of child prostitution. Las Vegas police claimed that "roughly 400 children are picked off the streets from prostitution each year."

The U.S. Justice Department has also named Las Vegas among the 17 most likely destinations for human trafficking.

== Criticism ==
The brothels in Nevada's rural counties have been criticized by law enforcement professionals, journalists, sex worker activists, feminists, social and religious conservatives and politicians.

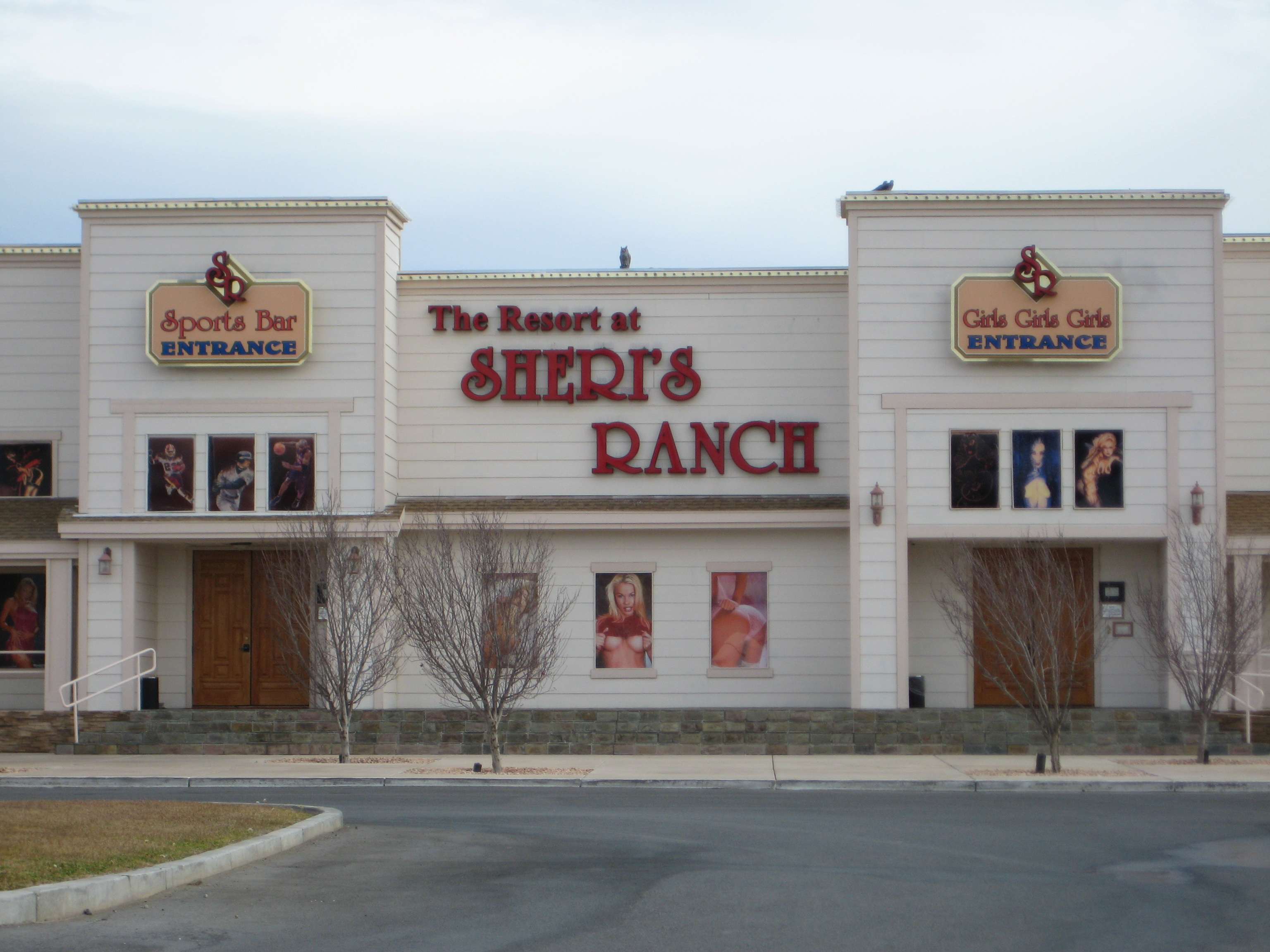
Sheri's Ranch in Pahrump

Columnist Bob Herbert wrote:

A grotesque exercise in the dehumanization of women is carried out routinely at Sheri's Ranch, a legal brothel about an hour's ride outside of Vegas. There the women have to respond like Pavlov's dog to an electronic bell that might ring at any hour of the day or night. At the sound of the bell, the prostitutes have five minutes to get to an assembly area where they line up, virtually naked, and submit to a humiliating inspection by any prospective customer who has happened to drop by".

During the 1970s and early 1980s, several towns had enacted rules prohibiting local brothel prostitutes from frequenting local bars or casinos or associating with local men outside of work. After a lawsuit was filed in 1984, these regulations had to be abandoned, but as a result of collaboration between sheriffs and brothel owners, they remain in effect unofficially. Most brothels do not allow the prostitutes to leave the premises during their work shifts of several days to several weeks.

In 2009, prostitution researcher Melissa Ditmore wrote in The Guardian that brothels "impose some extraordinary restrictions on commercial sex workers" in order to "separate sex workers from the local community": some places forbid prostitutes to leave the brothels for extended periods of time, while other jurisdictions require the prostitutes to leave the county when they are not working; some places do not allow the children of the women who work in the brothels to live in the same area; some brothel workers who have cars must register the vehicle with the local police, and workers are not permitted to leave the brothel after 5pm; in some counties registered sex workers are not allowed to have cars at all.

The Nevada brothel system has also been criticized by activists in the sex worker rights movement, who are otherwise supporters of full decriminalization of prostitution. Organizations and individuals supporting the rights of prostitutes typically favor deregulation and oppose Nevada-style regulation, mainly for three reasons:

- the licensing requirements create a permanent record which can lead to discrimination later on;
- the large power difference between brothel owner and prostitute gives prostitutes very little influence over their working conditions;
- while prostitutes undergo legal and health background checks, their customers do not; the regulations are thus designed to protect customers, not prostitutes.

Teri, a prostitute who has worked in a Nevada brothel (and who would like prostitution to be decriminalized), stated that "The brothel owners are worse than any pimp. They abuse and imprison women and are fully protected by the state".

Another former prostitute who worked in four Nevada brothels attacked the system, saying, "Under this system, prostitutes give up too much autonomy, control and choice over their work and lives" and "While the brothel owners love this profitable solution, it can be exploitative and is unnecessary". She described how the women were subject to various exaggerated restrictions, including making it very difficult for them to refuse clients, not being allowed to read books while waiting for customers, and having to deal with doctors who had a "patronizing or sexist attitude" (the brothels discouraged and in many cases forbade prostitutes to see doctors of their own choosing).

In an article published in The Guardian in 2007, anti-prostitution campaigner, Julie Bindel wrote: "If you believe their PR, Nevada's legal brothels are safe, healthy – even fun – places in which to work. So why do so many prostitutes tell such horrific tales of abuse?"

In her 2007 report, Prostitution and trafficking in Nevada: making the connections, anti-prostitution activist Melissa Farley presents the results of numerous interviews with brothel owners and prostitutes, she says that most brothel prostitutes are controlled by outside pimps and that they suffer widespread abuse by brothel owners and customers. Farley said that "What happens in legal brothels is sexual harassment, sexual exploitation and sometimes rape"; she also said more than 80% of the women she had interviewed told her they wanted to leave prostitution.

Alexa Albert, a Harvard medical student who has conducted a public-health study inside one of Nevada's brothels, and authored Brothel: Mustang Ranch and Its Women, wrote in her book that the brothel owners used to require the prostitutes to have outside pimps, because the pimps were thought to make the women work harder: "The involvement of pimps enabled brothel owners to leave discipline to men who wouldn't hesitate to keep their women in line."

Bob Herbert also stated that many brothel prostitutes are controlled by outside pimps: "Despite the fiction that they are "independent contractors," most so-called legal prostitutes have pimps — the state-sanctioned pimps who run the brothels and, in many cases, a second pimp who controls all other aspects of their lives (and takes the bulk of their legal earnings)."

In 1998, pimps from Oregon managed to place at least four underage girls in Nevada's legal brothels; they were arrested and convicted.

On underage girls being trafficked to Nevada's brothels, Oregon Detective Greg Harvey said, "It's happening right now, it's amazing how many girls are shipped from here to different brothels in northern and southern Nevada. Many are underage." Another detective, Sgt. Pete Kerns, supported Harvey's claims. "Never buy the line that nobody under 18 works in (Nevada brothels)," Kerns said. "It's happening."

Former Nye County Commissioner Candice Trummell, director of the Nevada Coalition Against Sex Trafficking, said, "It is way past time for Nevada to be the last state in the United States of America to finally stand against all forms of slavery."

Assemblyman Bob L. Beers said, "A brothel owner is somebody who, when it gets down to the very essence, is nothing more than a slave-owner."

Some brothel owners have been involved in criminal activities: in March 2009, a Nye County brothel owner pleaded guilty to fraud charges for paying bribes to a former Nye County Commissioner; in 2008, a former brothel owner was sentenced to 15 years in federal prison on two child pornography charges; and in 1991, Joe Conforte fled to Brazil in order to avoid a conviction on tax fraud charges.

== Politics ==
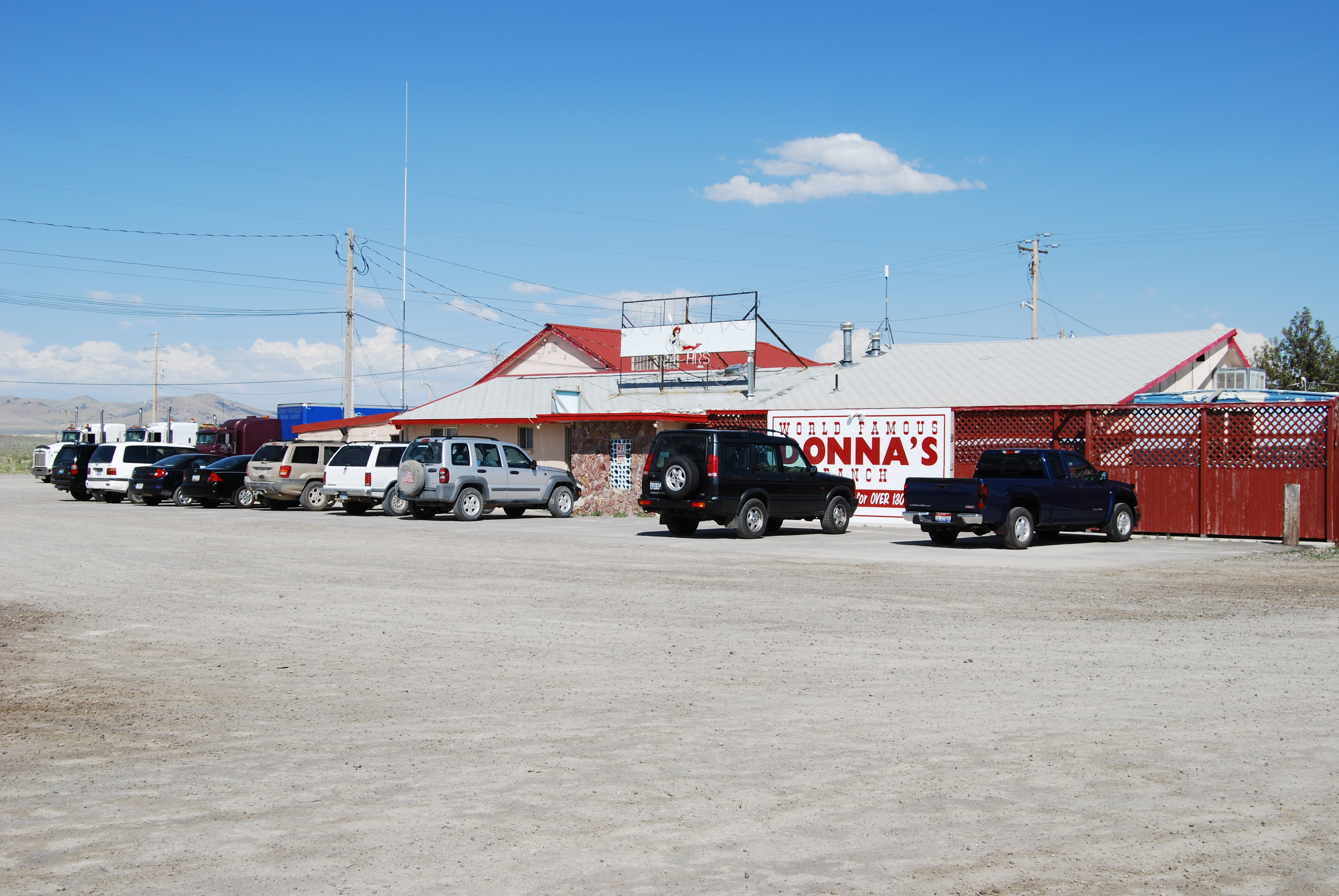
Donna's Ranch brothel in Wells.

Occasionally, lawmakers attempt to introduce legislation outlawing all prostitution in Nevada. These efforts are typically supported by owners of casinos and other large businesses, claiming that legalized prostitution harms the state's image. The Nevada Brothel Owners' Association, led by George Flint of Reno, lobbies against these laws. Rural lawmakers normally oppose these laws as well, despite the fact that legal brothel prostitution does not provide a significant amount of income for counties.

A noted opponent of legalized prostitution in Nevada was John Reese. Initially arguing on moral and religious grounds, he switched to health hazard tactics, but had to back down in the face of a threatened libel suit. In 1994, he tried to get a license for a gay brothel in a thinly veiled attempt to galvanize opposition against all brothels. Five years later, he staged his own kidnapping near the Mustang Ranch. His efforts to collect enough signatures to repeal the prostitution laws have so far failed.

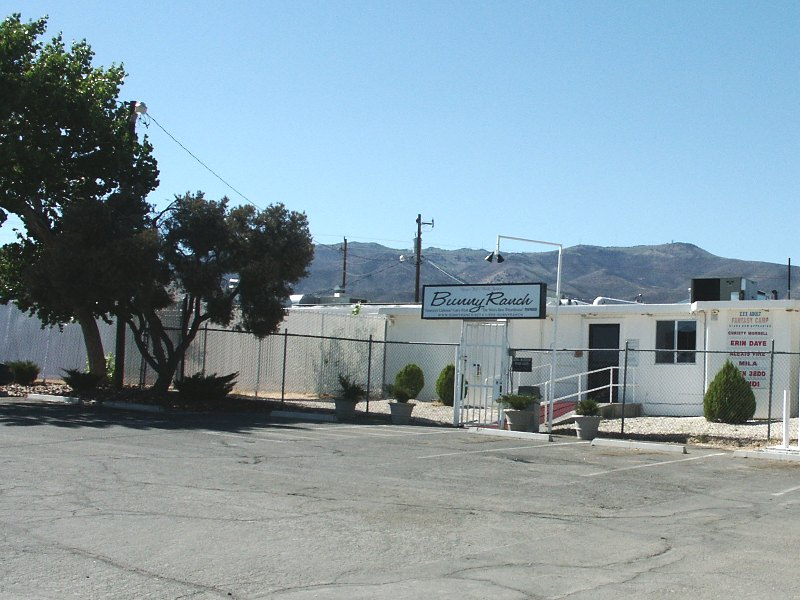
The Moonlite Bunny Ranch in Mound House near Carson City.

Nevada politicians can (and generally do) play both sides of the prostitution dispute by declaring that they are personally opposed to prostitution but feel it should be up to the counties to decide. As almost three-quarters of the population of Nevada lives in a single county (Clark County, where prostitution is illegal), county control over local matters is a hot-button issue. Legislators from the northern counties will often reflexively oppose what is seen as "meddling" from the majority in the south, and the legislators from the south have been too divided on the issue to push through a state-wide ban.

Since 2003, Las Vegas mayor Oscar Goodman has repeatedly stated that he favors legalization of prostitution in the city, perhaps turning East Fremont Street into a little Amsterdam. Goodman said there are pragmatic reasons to back legalized prostitution. Those include the acknowledgement that illegal prostitution is occurring and that brothels could provide safer, regulated and revenue-generating sex, he said.

The brothel owners' organization, supported by Democratic State Senator Bob Coffin, has been pushing for taxation of the brothels, to increase the industry's legitimacy. The proposal, which would have instituted a $5 tax per act of prostitution, with the proceeds partly being used for a sex worker counseling agency, was voted down in the Taxation Committee in April 2009.

In February 2011, U.S. Senator Harry Reid suggested that brothels be made illegal in Nevada.

== Public opinion ==
The opinions of Nevada residents vary, but the majority appears to support the status quo of prostitution: they support laws allowing licensed brothels in the rural areas, but oppose the legalization of prostitution in Las Vegas. A poll conducted in Nevada in 2002 found that 52% of the 600 respondents favored the existing legal and regulated brothels, while 31% were against laws that allow prostitution and the remainder were undecided, preferred fewer legal constraints on prostitution, or did not offer an opinion. In 2003, nearly 60% of Nevada residents opposed the legalization of brothels and prostitution in Las Vegas (59% opposed this idea, 35% supported it and 6% did not know or did not answer). Again, support was stronger in the rural areas (where most people were born in Nevada) and weaker in Clark County and Washoe County; women were more opposed to the idea than men.

In 2004, after the closure of the last brothel in Churchill County, a county ballot initiative to permanently ban prostitution in that county was defeated by a 2–1 margin.

A July 2011 Public Policy Polling survey found that 56% of Nevada voters thought that prostitution should be legal, while only 32% thought it should be illegal and 12% were not sure.

A June 2012 Public Policy Polling survey found that 64% of Nevada voters thought that brothels should be legal in the state, while only 23% thought they should be illegal, and 13% were not sure.

In 2018, Lyon County voted by a 3-to-1 margin to reject Question 1, which would have repealed the county's brothel ordinance and closed four brothels in Mound House.

== Museum ==
Crystal, Nye County, Nevada, had a brothel art museum associated with two local brothels. Visitors have reported it was primarily newspaper clippings. As of 2020 both Crystal brothels were closed.

== See also ==
- List of brothels in Nevada
- Prostitution in the United States
