= List of brothels in Nevada =

Locations with active brothels in Nevada
Major city

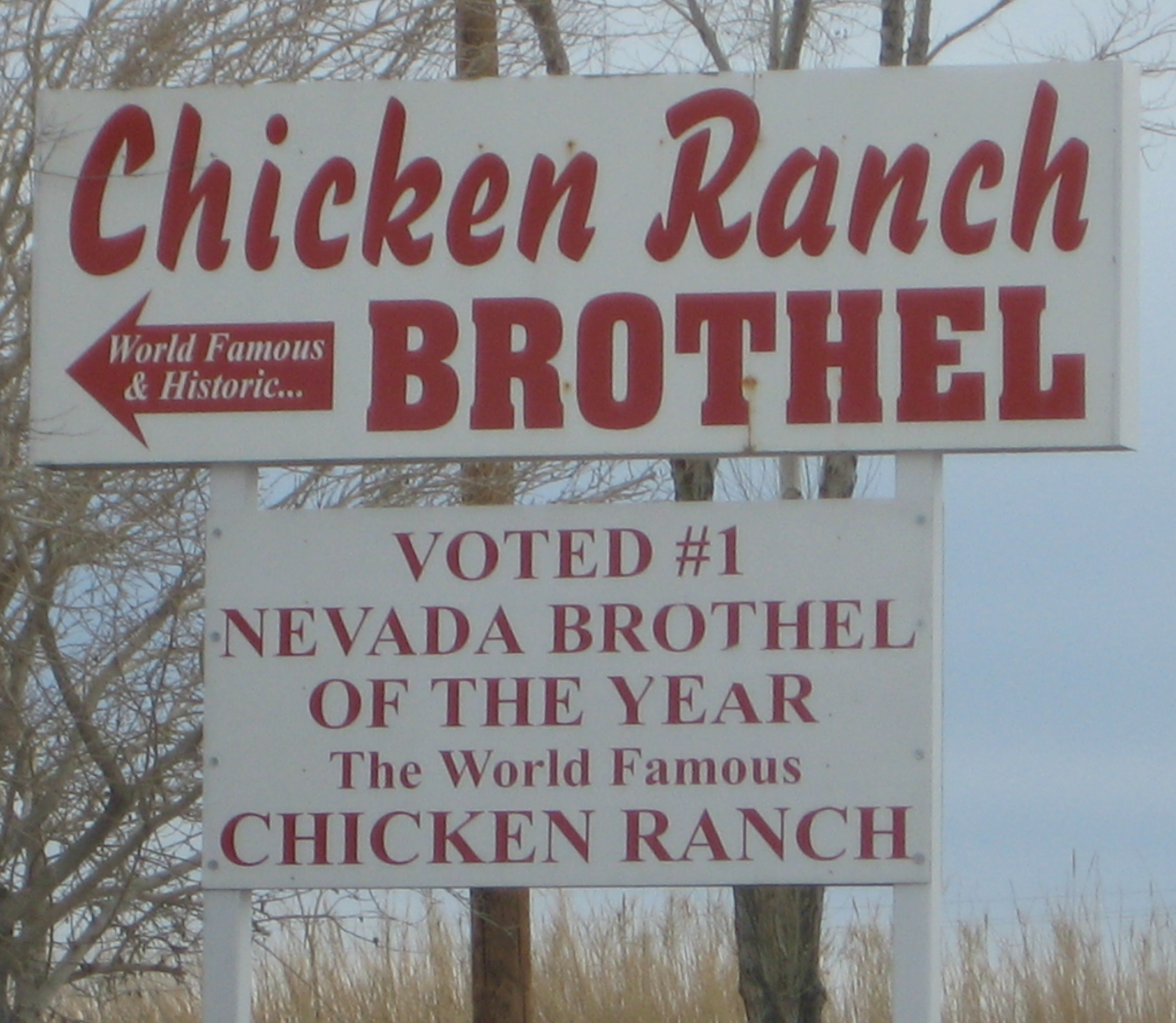
Chicken Ranch sign

This is a historical list of the legal brothels in Nevada. They are arranged by name within location (the nearest town or named place) within each county that licenses such establishments. Defunct establishments are retained for completeness. Note, however, that this list so far only covers the modern era of brothel prostitution in Nevada, from about 1950 onward, after the closure of the red light districts of Reno and Las Vegas.

As of September 2023, there were 19 legal brothels open in Nevada situated in 6 of the state's 17 counties, down from 21 legal brothels as of February 2018, and down from its peak of 35 in the early 1980s.

While prostitution is legal in parts of Nevada, it is illegal outside these licensed brothels. Prostitution is illegal under state law in Clark County, which contains Las Vegas and its metropolitan area. Other counties may choose to allow it, if they desire to. Currently Carson City (an independent city), Douglas County, Eureka County, Lincoln County, Pershing County and Washoe County (which contains Reno) ban brothels. The other ten counties permit brothels, but four of them do not currently have any active brothels.

== Active brothels ==
=== Elko County ===
==== Elko ====
- The Desert Rose Gentlemen's Club – opened in late 2014 in the building that had previously housed the No. 1 Geisha (which closed in 2011).
- Inez's D&D Bar – This brothel is reportedly supposed to stand for "Dancing and Diddling". The brothel is a next-door neighbour to the closed PJ's Lucky Strike,. It was one of the first Nevada brothels to have an internet presence. The brothel is under the same management as nearby Mona's Ranch.
- Mona's Ranch – Originally built as a family home in 1903, it was later converted to a brothel. It was formally known as Bette's D&D.
- Sue's Fantasy Club – Sue's has a mirrored dance floor and pole. Courtesans are all of Asian heritage.

==== Wells ====
- Bella's Gentlemen's Club

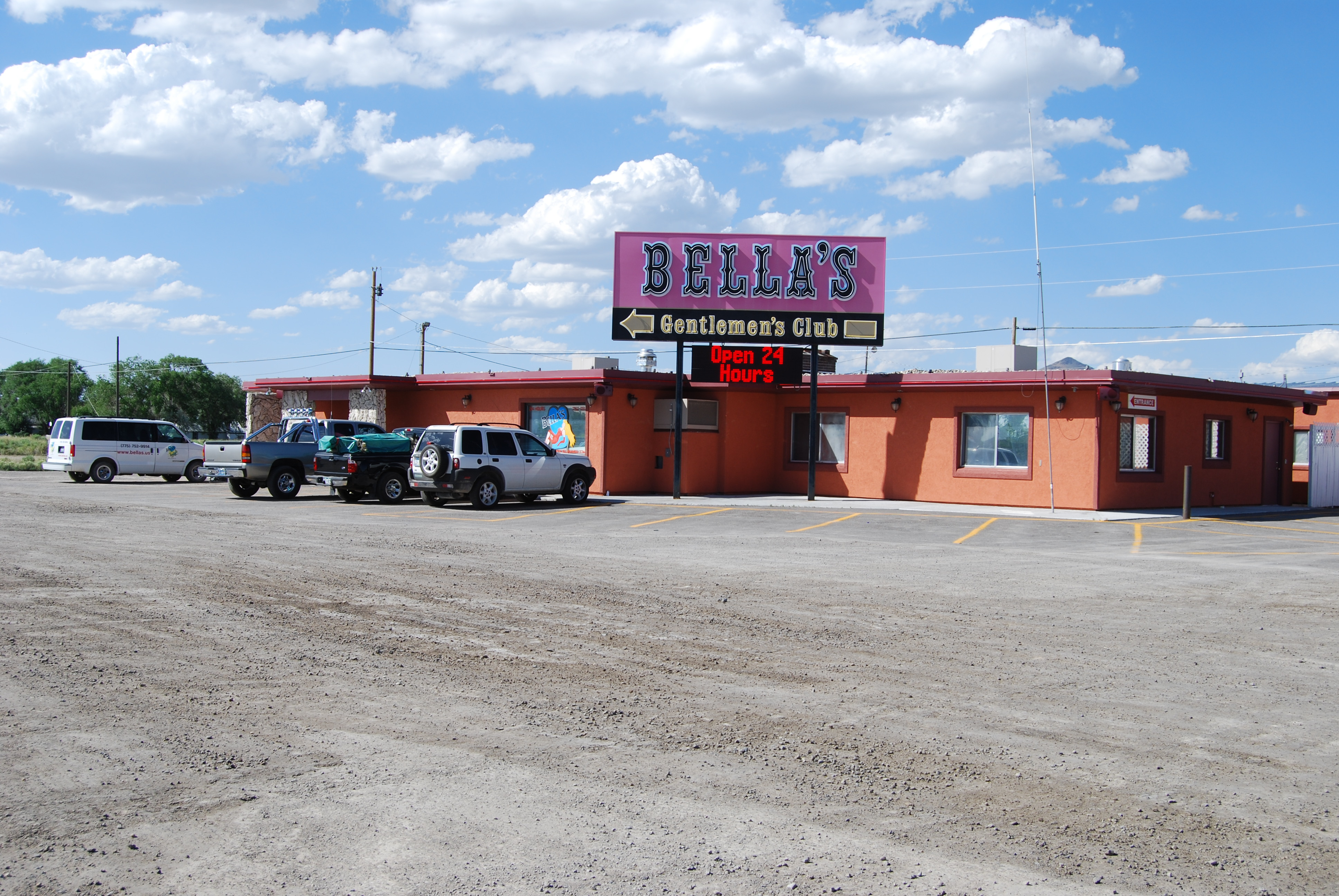
Bella's Gentlemen's Club

The ranch opened in 1950 as the Hacienda Ranch and is located just off Interstate 80. The rooms have different themes, and there is a jacuzzi and a BDSM dungeon. It has been owned and run since 1981 by Bella Shauna Cummins. In the late 1990s, Cummins had a road built from the ranch to the highway. The road avoids patrons having to cross the busy tracks of the Union Pacific Railroad. In 2004, the ranch was temporarily closed by the local sheriff's office for irregularities in medical certification of the prostitutes. The owners of Bella's, Shauna and Lance Cummins, subsequently sued Elko County Sheriff Dale Lotspeich for allegedly acting outside the law in closing the establishment. Their action against the sheriff was unsuccessful.

- Donna's Ranch

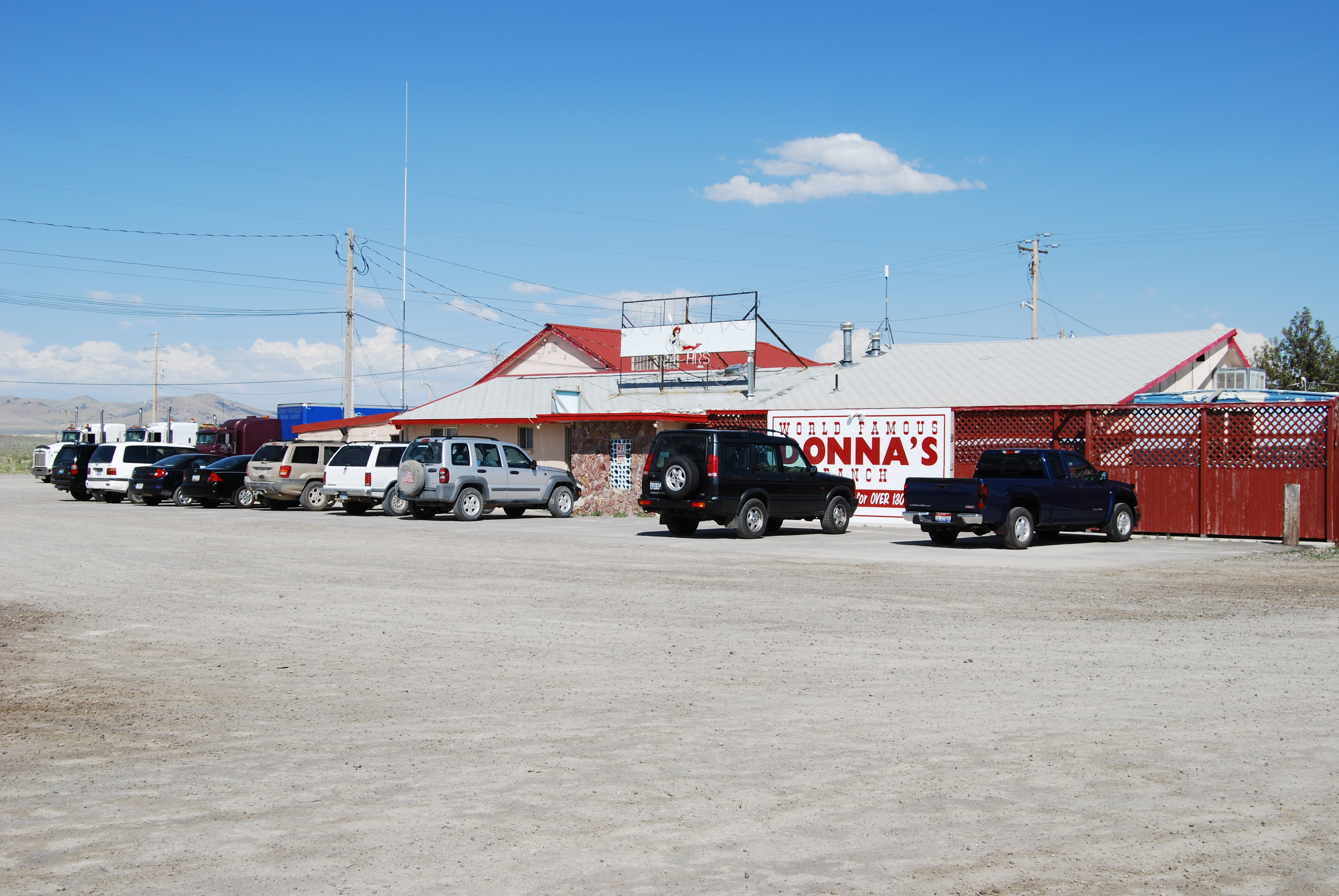
Donna's Ranch in 2007

The ranch was originally established near the railroad to serve the men constructing the nearby railroad. Wells was a major cattle pick-up point on the Central Pacific Railway, cowboys who had driven the cattle to the railroad celebrated in the ranch.

Current owner, Geoff Arnold purchased the ranch from Evelyn and Ken Merrill in 1999 for $1,000,000. The boxer Jack Dempsey was a previous owner.

=== Lander County ===
==== Battle Mountain ====
- The Desert Club The Desert Club first opened in the late 1800s, and is reputed to be one of the smallest brothels in Nevada. In 1986, the brothel was bought by Ginger and Chuck Barrett along with the nearby Calico Club. It closed down in 1991 but has since reopened.

=== Lyon County ===
==== Mound House ====
By local ordinance, brothels are restricted to the Mound House area.

- The Love Ranch

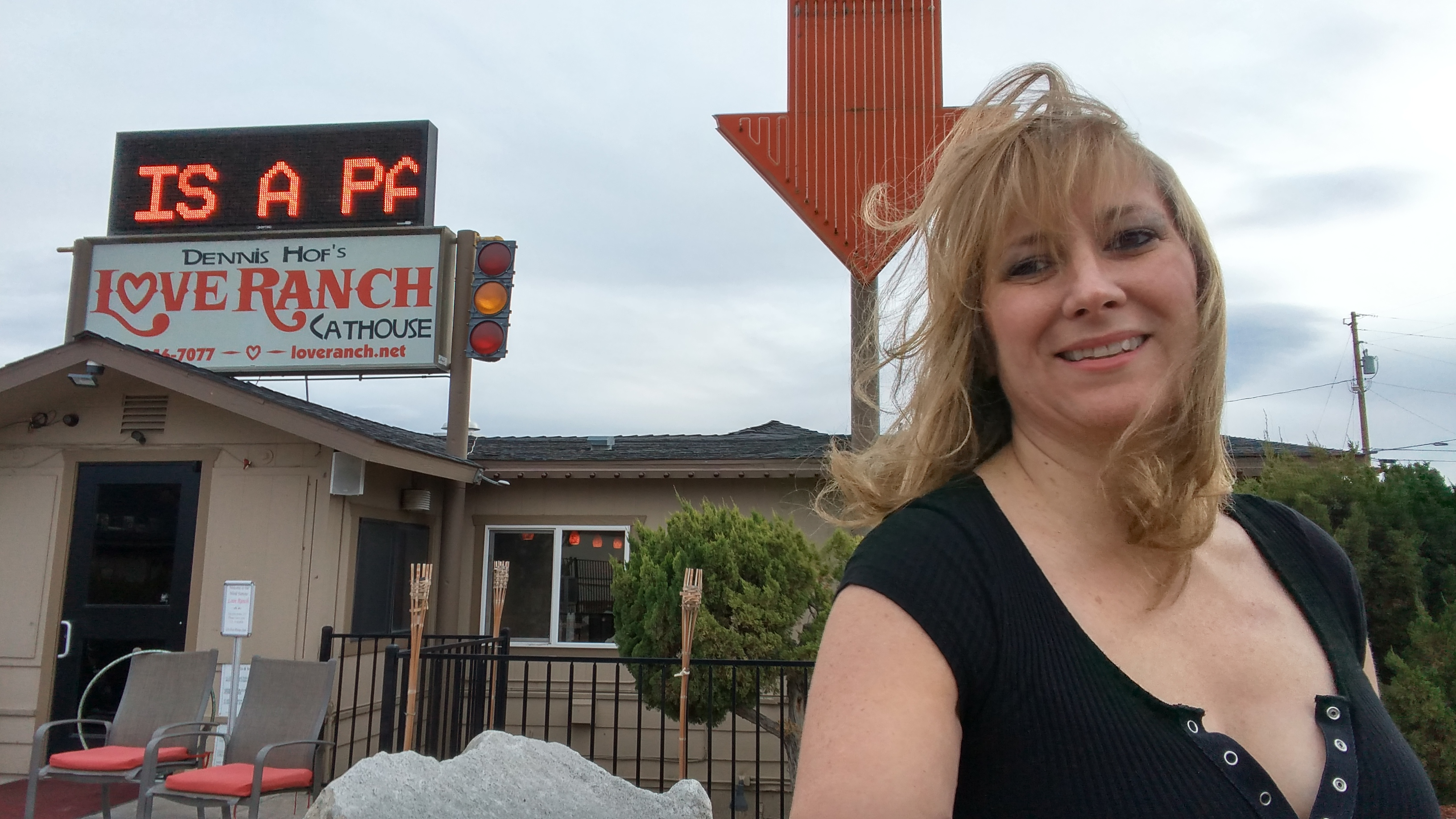
Catrina Costa, Legal Courtesan, outside the Love Ranch Brothel

Formerly known under several variations of the name Kitty's, this brothel was owned by Dennis Hof. Hof is best known as the star of HBO's Cathouse and proprietor of the nearby Moonlite BunnyRanch. Hof reportedly renamed this operation in 2004 to better take advantage of the "BunnyRanch brand name", which he has heavily promoted. In June 2008, this house was again renamed, this time as The Love Ranch in order to build a unique identity for the brothel. It is sometimes referred to as The Love Ranch North, to differentiate it from Love Ranch Vegas.

- Moonlite BunnyRanch

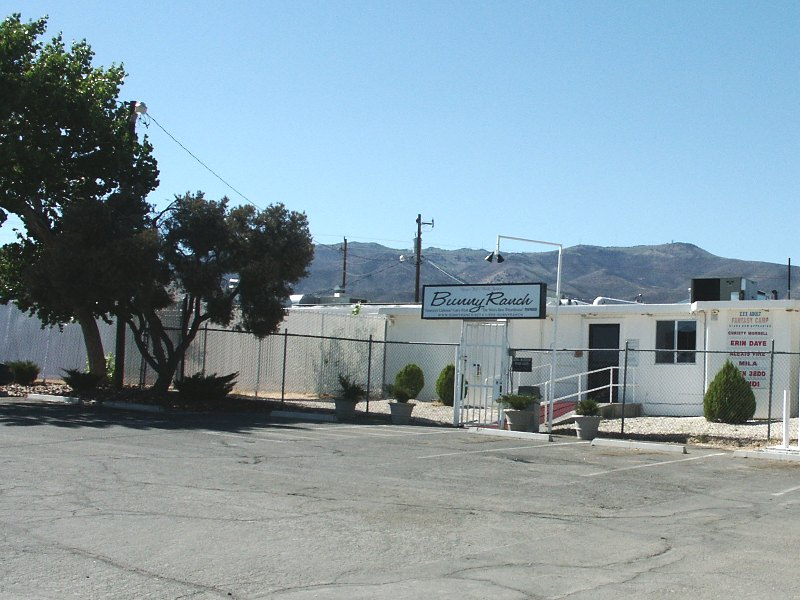
The Moonlite BunnyRanch in 2006

The brothel, now known as the Moonlite BunnyRanch, first opened in 1955 as the Moonlight Ranch. There is a historical marker on the premises, found just inside of the property's original main gate, as the ranch is located near a stop on the original Pony Express. It operated discreetly until 1971, when Nevada began regulation of houses of prostitution. Dennis Hof, a frequent customer, purchased the business in 1993 for $700,000 and invested another $500,000 in upgrading the facilities and decor.

The Moonlite BunnyRanch was featured on HBO's America Undercover show specials, Cathouse (2002) and Cathouse 2: Back in the Saddle (2003). This led to the series Cathouse: The Series, airing in two seasons in 2005 and 2007. The ranch was also featured as a supposedly "haunted house" in an episode of Proof Positive and is frequently mentioned on the Howard Stern Show, usually to announce that another porn star has started to work there.

- Sagebrush Ranch

Originally, the first Sagebrush Ranch was about 20 mile east of Carson City off US-50 East up Six Mile Canyon Road in Mark Twain through the 1980s. It was a two-story building, which was still in Lyon County before moving to current location. Then for a time, the Sagebrush Ranch was two separate (but connected) licensed brothels: the Sagebrush I (originally known as the Sagebrush Red-Light Ranch) and the Sagebrush II, just north of the original brothel. In 1999, the Sagebrush I building was destroyed by a fire that was accidentally sparked by an overturned candle in one of the ladies' rooms. While no one was seriously hurt in the fire, the Sage I building was a total loss. During its rebuilding, the Sage II building housed a combined operation. When the lavish new replacement facility opened in mid-2001, the ladies all moved into the new building, called simply the Sagebrush Ranch.

- Kit Kat Guest Ranch

The Kit Kat Guest Ranch is a legal, licensed brothel located about 7 miles (11 km) east of Carson City in the unincorporated town of Mound House, in Lyon County, at 48 Kit Kat Drive. It reopened in May 2016, after being purchased and renovated by Dennis Hof. In 2023, Kit Kat burned down. No one was harmed in the fire. Hof’s estate is working to entirely rebuild the brothel, but have yet to decide where and how to do so.

=== Mineral County ===
==== Mina ====
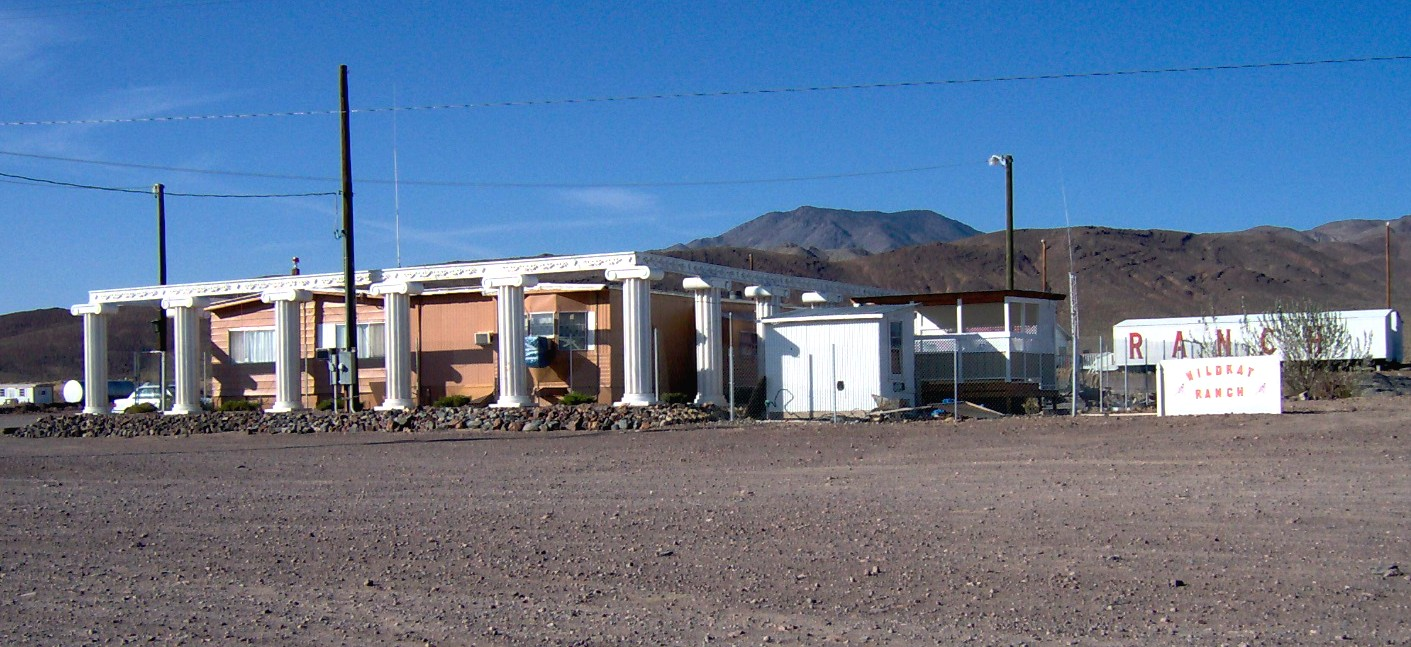
Wild Cat's Ionic columns

- Wild Cat Brothel – Known for its Ionic columns marking off the car park, it was formerly the Playmate Ranch. As the Playmate it was run by Bill 'Little Bill' Wilkins, who also owned the nearby Billie's Day & Night. It closed in about 2010 and was bought by Phil Maita who reopened it as the Wild Cat in 2013.

As of September 2023, the Wild Cat Brothel is "Temporarily Closed" according to its Google Business Profile listing.

=== Nye County ===
==== Amargosa Valley ====
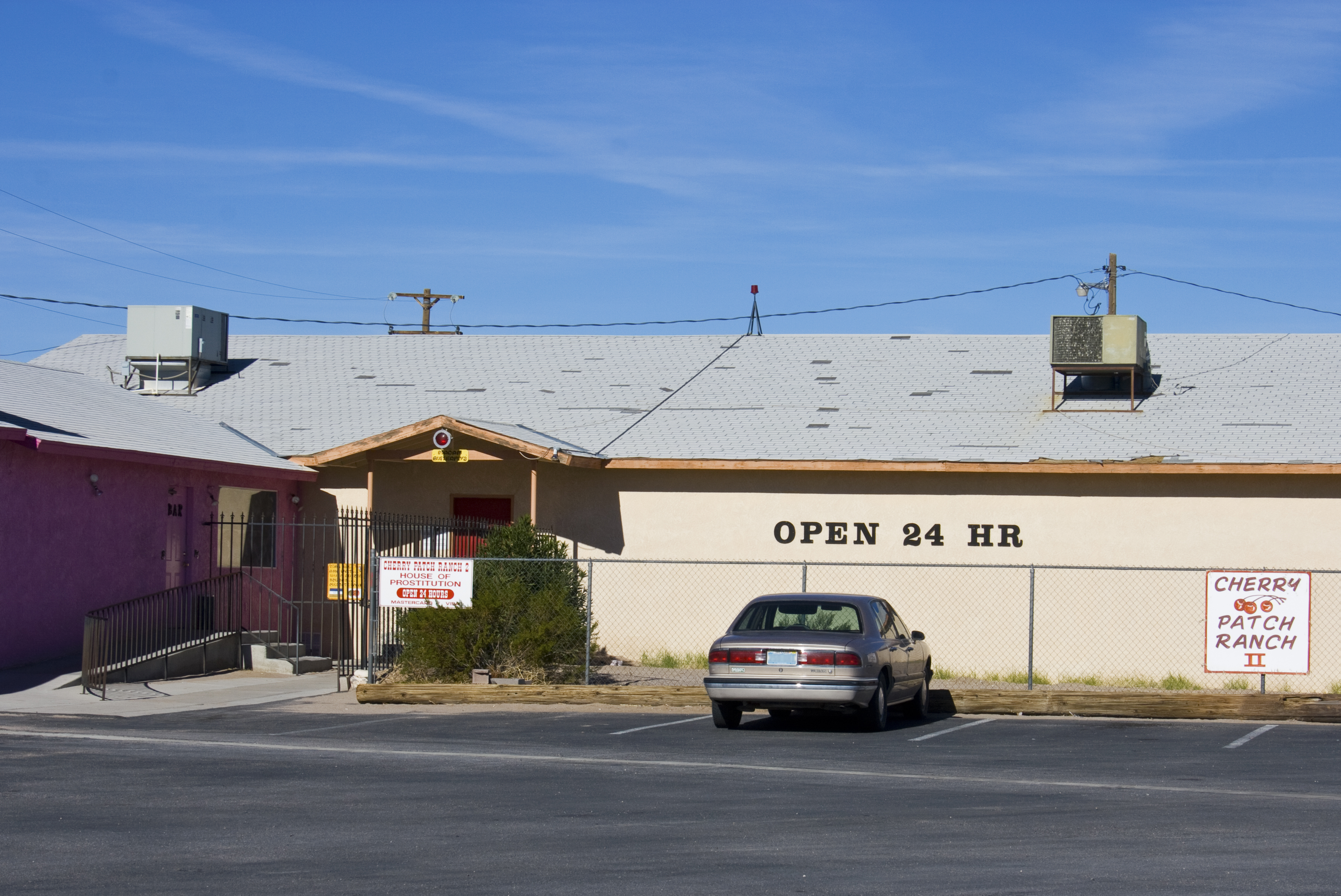
Cherry Patch II

- Alien Cathouse (sometimes referred to as "Lathrop Wells") – Originally the Cherry Patch II, and owned by Joe Richards, it was purchased by Dennis Hof, who sold it prior to his death.

==== Crystal ====
- Love Ranch South

The Love Ranch business was purchased by Dennis Hof, owner of several other Nevada brothels, in the fall of 2010. It has since been extensively upgraded. Formerly called the Cherry Patch Ranch, Crystal Love Ranch, Mabel's Whorehouse, Madame Butterfly's. On October 16, 2018 Dennis Hof died in this facility, which subsequently closed.

==== Pahrump ====
- Chicken Ranch

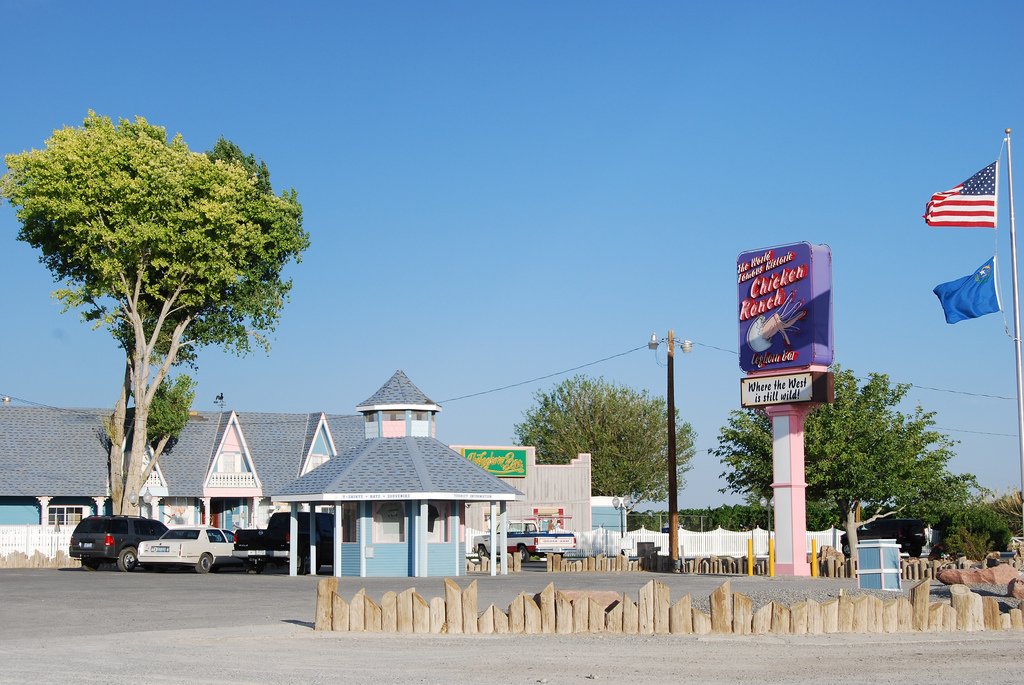
Chicken Ranch in 2007

Walter Plankinton opened the Nevada Chicken Ranch in 1976, as close to Las Vegas as legally possible. He encountered strong opposition from local law enforcement and other brothel owners. In 1978, the Chicken Ranch was burned to the ground, allegedly by arsonists. The twelve prostitutes and two employees barely survived. Plankinton reopened with a new set of trailers five days later.

In 1982, Plankinton sold the Chicken Ranch for $1,000,000 to Kenneth Green, a San Francisco businessman, and Russel Reade, an ex-teacher. Reade, who had contributed $25,000 towards the purchase, became the manager. Around 15 women were working at the ranch at that time. On February 8, 2006, the ranch accepted a purchase offer for $5.2 million.

- Sheri's Ranch

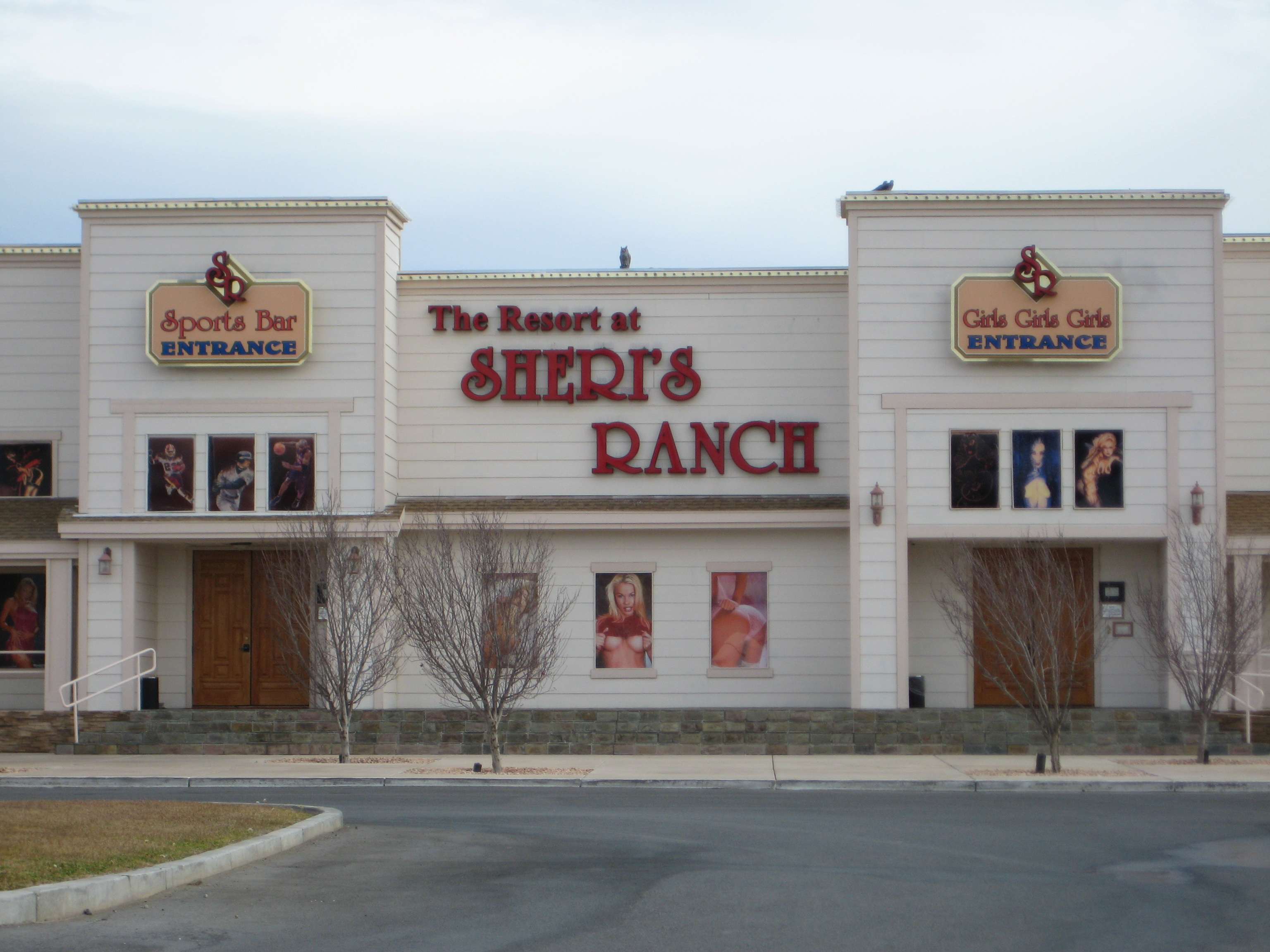
Sheri's Ranch in 2008

Unlike other brothels in the state, Sheri's Ranch styles itself as a resort, with upscale rooms and furnishings, sports bar, tennis courts, a spa and outdoor swimming pool. In January 2001, the business was purchased by Chuck Lee, a retired Chicago homicide detective of 20 years, former owner of an AT&T retail store, and car dealership owner from Las Vegas, Nevada.

Author Lora Shaner, a former madam of the brothel, wrote a 1998 book about her experiences, Madam: Chronicles of a Nevada Cathouse, reissued and extended in 2001 as Madam: Inside a Nevada Brothel.

=== Storey County ===
- Mustang Ranch

The original Mustang Ranch was forfeited to the federal government in 1999 following owner, Joe Conforte's convictions for tax fraud, racketeering and other crimes. In 2002, the brothel's furniture, paintings and accessories were auctioned off. The Bureau of Land Management sold the Ranch's pink stucco structures on eBay in 2003. Bordello owner Lance Gilman purchased the buildings for $145,100 and moved them to his Wild Horse Adult Resort & Spa five miles to the east, where the relocated and extensively renovated buildings eventually became the second brothel located at that complex. However, the rights to the name Mustang Ranch, which Gilman had hoped to use for this new brothel, were tied up in a court battle with David Burgess, the owner of the Old Bridge Ranch, nephew of Joe Conforte, and manager of the Mustang Ranch from 1979 until 1989. In December 2006, a federal judge ruled that Gilman was the "exclusive owner of the Mustang Ranch trademark" giving him the rights to use the name and branding.

=== White Pine County ===
==== Ely ====
Ely City Council restricted brothels to one area on the outskirts in 1959. At one stage the brothels covered three blocks and employed over 400 women. The two remaining brothels are located in "Bronc Alley" red-light district in High Street.

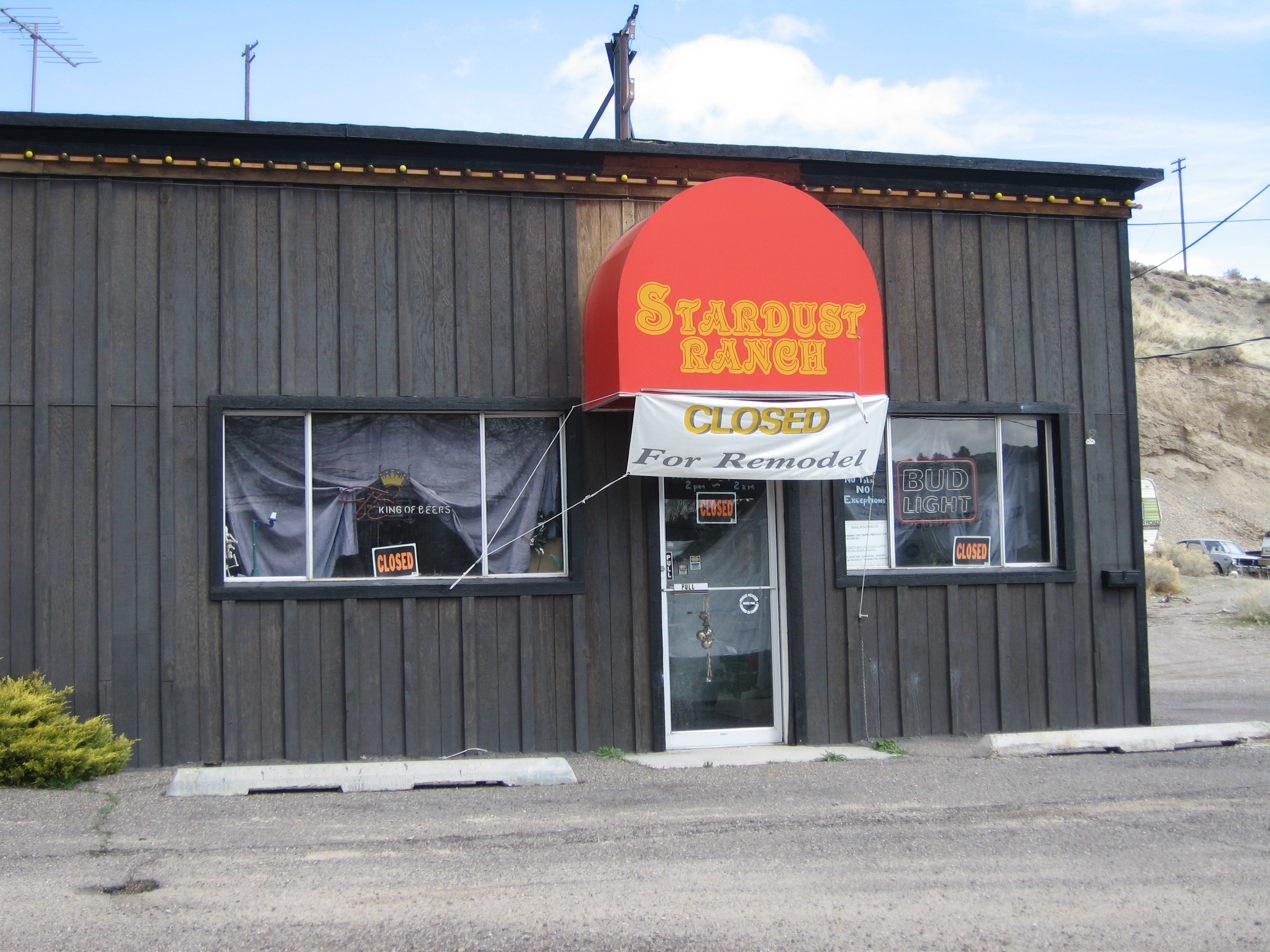
Stardust Ranch in 2006

- Stardust Ranch – In 1999 the City Council voted 3–2 to shut down the Stardust but Mayor Robert Miller overturned this decision because of the economic benefits the brothel brought to the city.
- Big 4 Ranch – One of the oldest brothels in Nevada, it was built in the late 1880s and opened as Rainey's dance hall. In 1939 it became a brothel, named the "Big 4" after the four men who co-owned it. The brothel closed in 1999 and was bought by the owners of the Stardust Ranch

== Defunct brothels ==
=== Churchill County ===
==== Fallon ====
- Lazy B Ranch – It opened in 1975, and was reputed to allow minors as customers, even having a separate waiting room for them. There was no main-connected power or water at the brothel. Power was supplied from a generator. A well was dug but the water was too salty to drink, so drinking water had to be shipped in and the women showered at the nearby Salt Wells Villa. The brothel closed in 1999 and it was rumoured that it was bought by Momma Katt, the former madam at Sue's in Elko, but it never reopened.
- Salt Wells Villa – This brothel was a collection of trailers located at Salt Wells, 15 miles east of Fallon. It opened in 1975 and featured a fireplace, pool table and a dancing stage. In 1977 it was firebombed. The local sheriff's wife, Mildred Banovich, was charged with arson and received a short jail sentence after pleading guilty. The brothel's owner, Reina Fuchigami (aka Gina Wilson), sold the business in the 1980s after being accused of employing underage prostitutes. The brothel changed hands several times until bought by James Kopulos in 1996.

Many of Kopulos's customers were from the nearby Fallon Naval Air Station, who received a 10% discount, and some paid by credit card. The cards were billed as "James Fine Dining". A 1998 report by the General Accounting Office censured the Navy for about 50 of its cardholders spending more than $13,000 at Salt Wells and other Nevada brothels using their travel cards. Free showers and coffee were offered to truckers.

In January 2000, GQ magazine called Salt Wells Villa the best brothel in Nevada.

Prostitute Maggie Holmes accused the brothel of not withholding taxes from her money and failing to pay for her medical examinations in 2003. In response Kopulos claimed he did not understand the intricacies of local laws. Later in the year the brothel was closed for a short while after inspectors found rodent infestation and a lack of drinking water. In financial trouble, and the county having voted to revoke his license, Kopulos surrendered his license and closed the brothel in May 2004.

=== Clark County ===
==== Las Vegas ====
- Arizona Club – Originally a large bar in Las Vegas's Block 16, famous for its 40-foot mahogany bar. When the bar changed hands in 1912, the new owner built a second story to house a brothel. It became known as the "Queen of Block 16". The brothel continued until 1942 when the Las Vegas authorities, under pressure from the US Military, closed the whole of Block 16.
- Roxie's – Closed in 1954 after a federal raid. At the trial it emerged that the county sheriff had been receiving bribes to keep the brothel open.

=== Elko County ===
==== Carlin ====
- Sharon's Brothel & Bar – Permanently Closed.
- Dovetail Ranch – The Dovetail had been a brothel on and off for a number of years. In 2002 the brothel was remodelled as a log cabin and a license issued to Michael and Pamela Tangreen. Melba Jordan and Marie Cutler were granted the license in 2003, both had previously worked at Donna's Ranch in Wells. The Dovetail Ranch closed in June 2006 and reopened in January 2008. It was refurbished in the spring of that year and one of the courtesans, "Tempting Tiffany" took over as manager. The brothel was the winner of the CWMC 2011 Small Brothel of the Year Award. In August 2024, the Carlin City Council voted to revoke the Dovetail Ranch's brothel license after finding that the brothel had multiple violations and was permanently closed.

==== Elko ====
- PJ's Lucky Strike (closed, early 2000s)
- No. 1 Geisha

Formerly Mona Lisa Ranch and CharDon's Club, it closed in 2011.

==== Wells ====
- Blue Fox Brothel

=== Esmeralda County ===
==== Lida Junction ====
- Cottontail Ranch

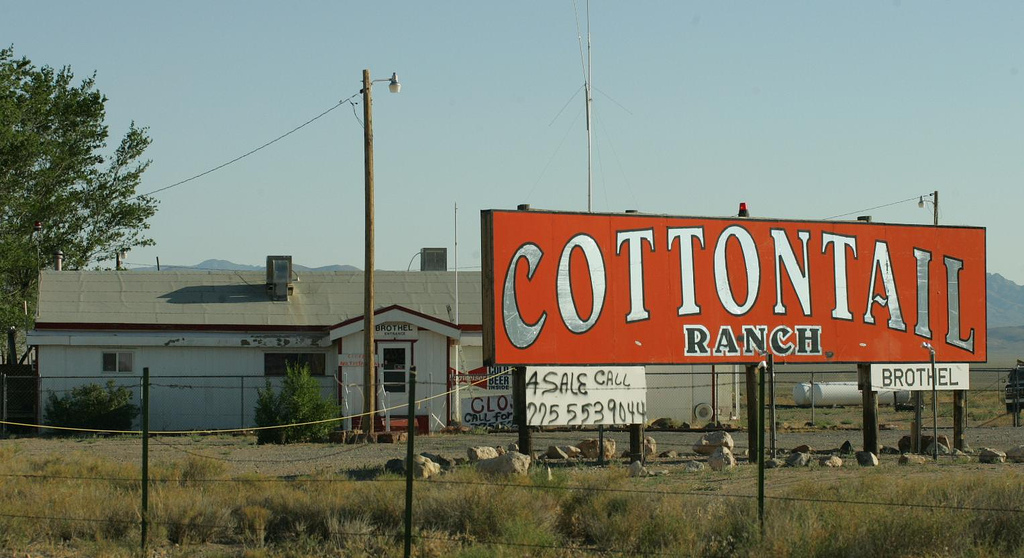
Cottontail Ranch in 2006

The ranch opened in October 1967. It is also known as the Cottontail Ranch Club. In 1967, Howard Hughes allegedly made several visits to the Cottontail Ranch for entertainment while he was living in Las Vegas.

In the 1970s, then madam Beverly Harrell battled with the United States Bureau of Land Management which was attempting to have the brothel removed from federal land. Harrell also was a candidate for the Nevada Assembly in 1974.

The Cottontail Ranch was closed in 2004 when the madam retired.

==== Goldfield ====
- The Den – Attached to the Ajax & Martine Saloon.
- Harem – It was run by Dorothy Reed.

=== Eureka County ===
Brothels are now illegal in Eureka County.

==== Eureka ====
- Pat's Country Club – This brothel was located half a mile east of Eureka and was only open for a short while. It was operated by the owner of Fran's Star Ranch

=== Humboldt County ===
==== Winnemucca ====
Winnemucca's brothels were concentrated in a single cul-de-sac called The Line. There was parking for about 80 trucks, and the truck drivers were offered free showers & coffee.

- Cozy Corner Brothel – This brothel was refurbished in 2000. It closed in the winter of 2005 and reopened in the summer of 2006 as the Wild West Saloon.
- My Place Bar and Brothel (formerly Irene's Combination Bar; closed and demolished)
- Paradise Cafe – This was also a strip club, the prostitutes also performing the striptease.
- Pussycat Ranch – It has also been known as Pussycat Saloon and Pussycat Brothel. It was built in 1839 as a saloon. It is now closed and demolished
- Simones de Paris – Simones reopened in 2001 and featured a Jacuzzi. It is now closed and was demolished in 2008.
- Villa Joy Brothel – This was the largest brothel in Winnemucca. It had a strip club attached, the Paradise Cafe.

=== Lander County ===
==== Battle Mountain ====
- Calico Club – In 1986 the brothel was bought by Ginger and Chuck Barrett along with the nearby Desert Club. The Calico Club was sold to owners of Donna's Ranch in October 2000 and renamed Donna's Battle Mountain Ranch.

=== Lincoln County ===
Prostitution made illegal in 1978, but several legal brothels operated before then.

==== Coyote Springs ====
- Betty's Coyote Springs Ranch – Opened in 1970–71 by Sally Hall, it was known as Sally's. It was taken over by Betty Armstrong (aka Betty Rustin) in 1972 and the name changed. The brothel was later taken over by Judy Kuban and the name changed to Judy's Ranch. Located on Highway 93, this brothel featured a waterbed room, swimming pool, and horse stables. This brothel closed when Lincoln County introduced its prostitution ban. The owner was co-appellant with the owner of Sheri's Ranch in the unsuccessful attempt to have the ban overturned.
- Sheri's Ranch

This brothel was located on Highway 93 and featured a swimming pool and an airstrip. Following the ban on prostitution in Lincoln County, the owner, Lorraine Helms, appealed against the brothel ban, on the grounds it was unlawful. The Supreme Court of Nevada ruled that the ban was lawful in 1980. The brothel subsequently relocated to Pahrump in Nye County.

=== Lyon County ===
Restricted brothels to Mound House area, east of Carson City, in 1970, forcing brothels in other parts of the county to close.

==== Mound House ====
- Starlight Ranch (1970s – early 1980s)

==== Wabuska ====
- Town House Guest Ranch – This was a busy brothel in the 1960s and closed around 1970 when Lyon County restricted brothels to the Mound House area.

==== Yerington ====
- Old Hospital (1940s)
- Green Lantern (1950s)

=== Mineral County ===
==== Hawthorne ====
- Desert Dollhouse/The Green Front – In the 1970s the Green Front operated from a main road in Hawthorne. Because the cars of local officials were often seen in the parking lot, it relocated to a discreet side street circa 1980. In the late 1980s, under pressure from local inhabitants, the brothel moved to a dirt road off Highway 95 north of Hawthorne and the name changed to the Desert Dollhouse.

==== Mina ====
- Billie's Day & Night – A small brothel run by septuagenarian Opel Radcliffe It was later owned by Bill 'Little Bill' Wilkins who also owned the nearby Playmate Ranch.
- Francine's Lucky Strike Brothel

==== Schurz ====
- B.J.'s – B.J.'s operated from a converted motel on Highway 95 from 1980 to 1981. It was named after Betty and Jean, the two women who owned it.

=== Nye County ===
==== Ash Meadows ====
- Ash Meadows Sky Ranch

Originally built as a motel and restaurant, the Ash Meadows Lodge, a brothel was later added. Located on a gravel road 2.5 miles from the California border, it was one of the first three brothels to be licensed by Nye County in 1958. Vickie Starr brought the brothel in 1971 after selling Vickie's Star Ranch in Beatty. She changed the name to Ash Meadows Sky Ranch, "sky" coming from the brothel's airstrip. The ranch was one of the most impressive brothels in Nevada during the period, featuring a swimming pool, restaurant, hotel, and golf course. A few years later Nye County declined to renew the brothel license because, due to its remote location, it was costly for the medical examiner to visit weekly for the prostitutes check-ups. The brothel closed. Several scenes from the 1987 film Cherry 2000 were shot at the disused brothel.

==== Belmont ====
- Cosmopolitan Saloon – Mentioned in the Belmont Courier, March 21, 1874.
- Crook Shop – Mentioned in the Belmont Courier, June 27, 1874.

==== Beatty ====
- Red Rooster (operated prior to 1960s)
- Willow Trees (operated prior to 1960s. Also known as the Weeping willows)
- Angel's Ladies

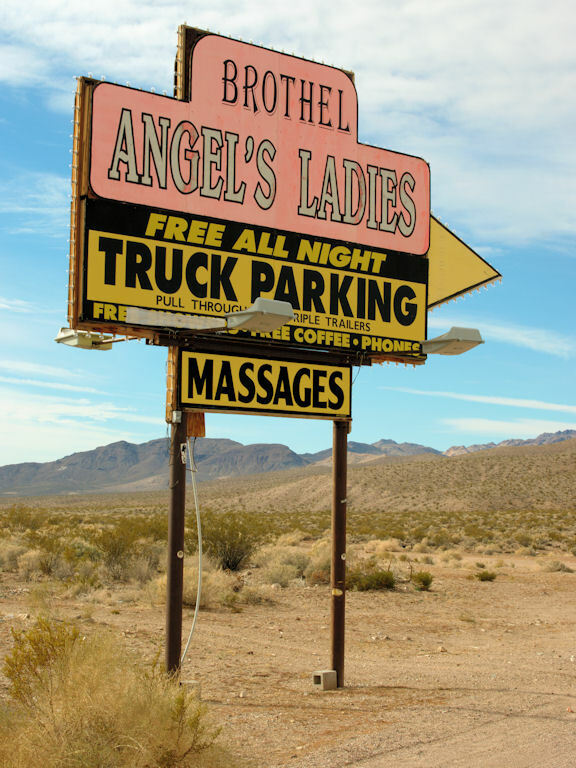
Angel's Ladies sign

Originally planned as the Cottonwood Club, it was opened as the Jolly Dolly by Joe Conforte as one of the three brothels licensed by Nye County when they first passed brothel legislation in 1958. The other two were the Ash Meadows Lodge in Ash Meadows and the Buckeye Bar outside Tonopah. Betty Anderson ran the brothel. Vickie Starr purchased the brothel in 1959 or 1960 and changed the name to Vickie's Star Ranch. The brothel was badly damaged by floods in about 1970 and Starr sold it to Fran York and an investor in 1971, who changed the name to Fran's Star Ranch. York bought out the investor in 1979 for $250,000. It featured an airstrip and a 50' swimming pool In 1997 the brothel was sold to Mack Moore who changed the name to Angel's Ladies, Angel being the name of his wife. The brothel closed in August 2014.

- Bikini's Gentlemen's Club – Guy Brenkman, owner of a strip club in Peoria, Illinois, moved to Nevada with the intention of opening a brothel. He brought 80 acres about a mile south of Beatty and built his brothel, which also featured a strip club. In January 2011, Nye County issued a brothel license for Bikini's Gentlemen's Club. The license was for five prostitutes to be working at any one time, out of a total of ten. Brenkman fell foul of the advertising regulations for brothels, however, resulting in his license not being renewed in June of the same year.

==== Crystal ====
- Cherry Patch Ranch – Opened by Maynard "Joe" Richards in 1978, the Cherry Patch Ranch consisted of several trailers beside a road and dirt airstrip. Following Richards' bribing of a Nye County commissioner, the property was sold to Dennis Hof. Hof would announce several plans for reopening the closed brothel under different themes, however none would come to pass. The property was part of the sale of Hof's properties in 2022.

==== Montgomery Pass ====
- Janie's Ranch – Housed in a number of trailers, Janie's Ranch was located on Route 6. The women lived in one trailer and entertained in another. It was rumoured that the entertaining rooms all had cameras and intercoms. The madam, Betty, would yell at any disagreeable customers through the intercom. The brothel closed in the early 1990s.

==== Rhyolite ====
- Adobe Dance Hall – The Adobe was built in May 1905 by Bob Buynum. It consisted of a dance hall, bar, and rooms for the prostitutes' use. It was brought by Harry Duval, who owned a further eight cribs and a brothel in the red light district in 1910.
- Alberta Dent's – Originally Maggie Keeley's, it was valued at $3.500 in the 1907 tax assessment.
- Jewel Consolidated – Mabel Vaughn purchased a property in 1905 and converted it into a brothel. It marked the northwest corner of Rhyolite, Nevada's red-light district. The brothel was destroyed by fire in August 1908.

==== Tonopah ====
- Bobbie's Buckeye Bar – The Buckeye Bar was located on Route 6 just outside Tonopah on the site of the Buckeye Mine. It was opened by Mary ("Madam Bobbie") Duncan and Margaret Cox after Cox's previous brothel, The Trees, had been shut. Duncan later became the sole owner and the name was changed to Bobbie's Buckeye Bar. In 1963 the brothel was refurbished and greatly extended. The brothel closed when Madam Bobbie died in 1989. Nye County had enabled an ordinance that brothels must be at least 300 yards from any road. The Buckeye Bar was 100 yards from the road, but Duncan had been allowed to continue operating under "grandfather rights". The county refused to continue the grandfather rights to the purchasers of Duncan's estate. They appealed but were unsuccessful, so the brothel never reopened.
- Big Casino – Opened in late 1904 or early 1905, the Big Casino was a restaurant, saloon, betting parlor, dance hall, and brothel. It claimed to be the biggest of its type in the world. It also had a small orchestra.

There were three gaming tables and a bar inside the dance hall. There was an oak rail between the bar and the maple dance floor. Along one side of the dance floor were booths, each with a table and chairs and a door that could be closed. There was a balcony with rooms leading off this where the house prostitutes took their clients.

The Casino had wires to all the major racetracks of the time, and offered bets on all major sporting events. The Gans-Herman World Lightweight Boxing Championship fight was held there on New Year's Day 1907. Following the introduction of Nevada's anti-gambling law in 1910 the fortune of the Casino started to decline. In 1912, the Casino's liquor license was revoked by the Nye County commissioners for violating anti-gambling act. The following year, U.S. Circuit Court at Carson City appointed a receiver for the Big Casino Company to run the establishment until the financial matters were straightened out. Effectively the federal government were now running a brothel. It became known as "Woodrow Wilson's Dancing Academy". During this period, the 25–30 women working at the Casino were paid 40% of the drinks they sold and 50% of the charges for dances and 'other services'.

After the closure of the dance hall, the Casino was converted into the Big Casino Hotel in 1920 and continued the brothel activities. On August 23, 1922, a fire swept through Tonopah's red-light district and the Casino was destroyed.

- Nugget Bar – On December 18, 1951, the owner of the Nugget Bar, Inez Parker, and a prostitute who worked there, Alice Nashlund, were found in the bar having been assaulted. Nashlund died of her injuries two days later. Customer Ray Millan was arrested for the murder. He was acquitted at his trial. District Judge William D. Hatton directed a grand jury should look into the matter. The grand jury concluded Nashlund was murdered by person or persons unknown.
- Taxscine's – Run by Taxscine Ornelas, this brothel was one of the two remaining brothels in Tonopah's red-light district in 1951. During World War II, Taxscine was known by the airmen at the nearby Tonopah Air Force Base as "The Little Desert Mother".
- The Trees – After the red-light district in Tonopah was closed in 1952, Margaret Cox started a new brothel nearby. It was closed on the order of the District Attorney William J. Crowell on October 14, 1953.

==== Scotty's Junction ====
- Shady Lady Ranch

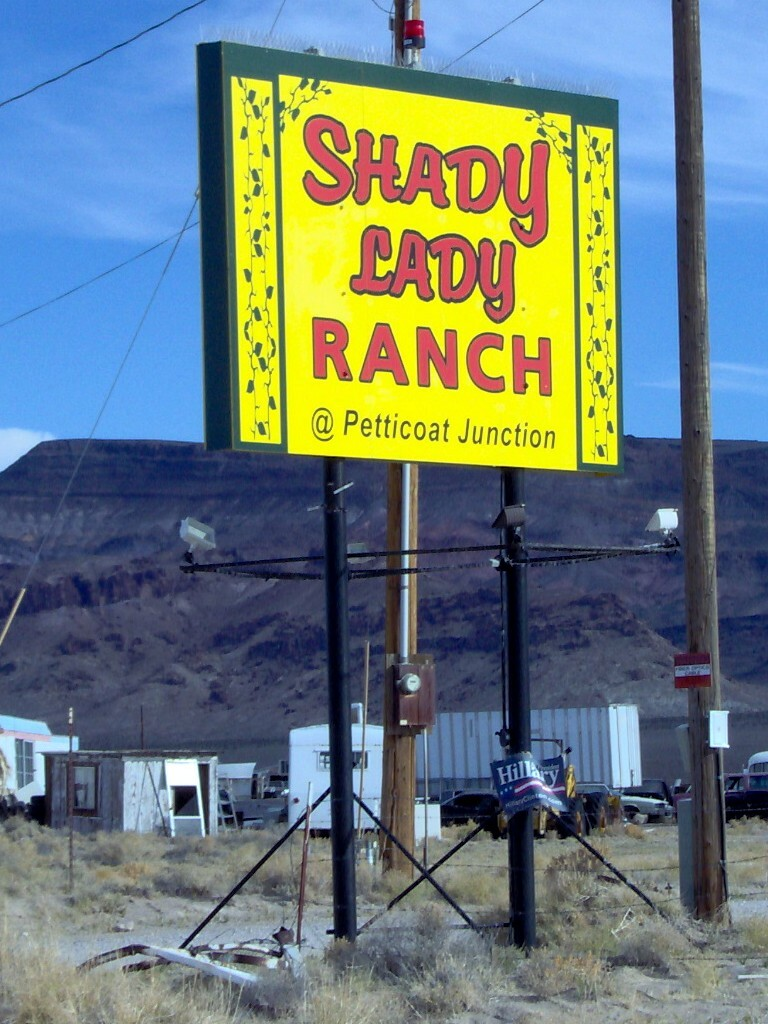
Shady Lady Ranch sign prior to 2014

The Shady Lady Ranch was a licensed brothel located south of Scotty's Junction, between Nye County mile markers 91 and 92 along U.S. Highway 95. Under former owner Bobbi Davis, the ranch became known for challenging Nevada laws restricting brothel advertising, as well as health regulations that effectively prevented men from working as licensed prostitutes.

The brothel ceased operations in December 2014, and the property was subsequently converted into a bed and breakfast. Nigel and Jennifer White acquired the property and reopened it as a bed and breakfast in September 2018.

In 2026, Nigel White submitted an application to Nye County seeking authorization to resume licensed brothel operations at the property. On November 12, 2026, the Nye County Licensing and Liquor Board voted to have the Nye County sheriff conduct a suitability review of the premises.

=== Pershing County ===
Pershing County used zoning laws to close its last brothel in 1970 and banned prostitution entirely in 1972.

==== Lovelock ====
All Lovelock brothels are now closed.

- La' Belle – La' Belle was the most impressive brothel in Lovelock. It was owned by Irene York.
- Monterey Bar – The Monterey Bar was located within Lovelock.
- Roadhouse – This brothel was located a couple of miles outside Lovelock. It closed circa 1970 when Pershing County passed a law restricting where brothels could be located.

=== Storey County ===
==== Sparks ====
- Mustang Ranch (1967–1999)

Opened by Joe Conforte in 1967, it burned down in 1975 (suspected arson) and was rebuilt about 500 feet (150 m) from the original site. A second brothel was built on the site in 1982 and known as the Mustang II, the original being rebranded as "World Famous Mustang Ranch". The brothel was seized and shut down by the IRS in 1999. The buildings were later auctioned off and moved to form the nearby World Famous Brothel.

- Old Bridge Ranch

Built on the site of the original Mustang Ranch It featured prints by Olivia De Berardinis, Salvador Dalí and Gottfried Helnwein on the walls. The owner, David Burgess, was a nephew of Joe Conforte, and managed the Mustang Ranch between 1979 and 1989.

In 1998 Burgess's brothel operator's license was revoked on the grounds he was a member of the Hells Angels. The Supreme Court of Nevada ruled that being a Hells Angel did not violate any conditions of the licensing, so his license was reinstated. In 2008 Burgess's RV was stopped in Wyoming by police. A search of the vehicle uncovered drugs and child pornography. Burgess was found guilty of possessing and transporting child pornography, and he was jailed for 15 years. Story County officials changed the brothel licensing laws to prevent Burgess's non-licensed associates from running the brothel and the brothel closed.

- Wild Horse Ranch (2002–2011)

On June 7, 2002, the Wild Horse Canyon Ranch opened for business in an eight-room temporary facility located on the property that would eventually become known as the Wild Horse Adult Resort & Spa. In May 2003 the newly built main house of the renamed Wild Horse Ranch opened for business. The former temporary facility was then renovated and became the Manager's Residence. The gated entrance to the entire property also opened at this time.

On November 15, 2011, The Wild Horse Ranch lost its brothel license and was forced to shut down. The license was revoked due to owner Lance Gilman illegally having a silent partner, Tom Gonzales, from whom he borrowed $2.25 million for 5% ownership.

- World Famous Brothel

The original Mustang Ranch was forfeited to the federal government in 1999 following owner, Joe Conforte's convictions for tax fraud, racketeering and other crimes. In 2002, the brothel's furniture, paintings and accessories were auctioned off. The Bureau of Land Management sold the Ranch's pink stucco structures on eBay in 2003. Bordello owner Lance Gilman purchased the buildings for $145,100 and moved them to his Wild Horse Adult Resort & Spa five miles to the east, where the relocated and extensively renovated buildings eventually became the second brothel located at that complex. However, the rights to the name Mustang Ranch, which Gilman had hoped to use for this new brothel, were tied up in a court battle with David Burgess, the owner of the Old Bridge Ranch, nephew of Joe Conforte, and manager of the Mustang Ranch from 1979 until 1989. The brothel was known as "World Famous Brothel" until the court ruled in favor of Gilman using the Mustang branding in December 2006.

==== Virginia City ====
- Julia's Place (19th century) – Operated by Julia Bulette.

==== near Wadsworth ====
- Triangle River Ranch (1955–1959) – Reported to have been operating illegally, located at the junction of Storey, Washoe, and Lyon Counties. The brothel's trailers were moved across county boundaries as legal situations dictated.

=== Washoe County ===
==== Reno ====
Brothels were restricted to an area known as "The Stockade", prior to their final closure in 1949. Brothels included:

- The Cottage
- The Willows (closed 1949)

=== White Pine County ===
==== Ely ====
- Green Lantern – The Green Lantern first opened in the 1950s and was one of the most impressive brothels in Ely. It closed briefly in 1995 on drug charges and permanently closed in 1999.
