= Project Vela =

American project monitoring Soviet nuclear activity

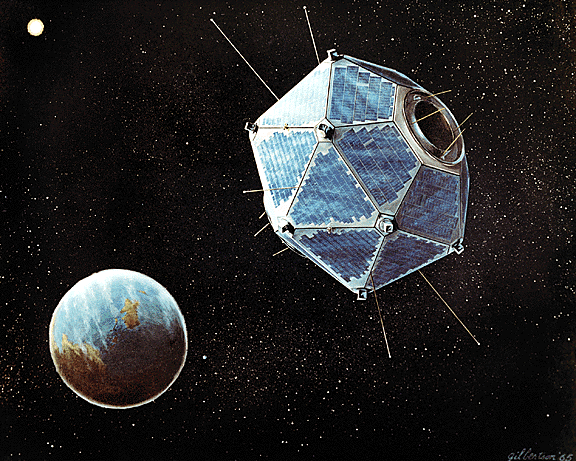
Artist's rendition of satellite Vela 5b in orbit around the Earth.

Project Vela was a United States Department of Defense project to monitor Soviet Union compliance with the 1963 Partial Test Ban Treaty. The treaty banned the testing of nuclear weapons in the atmosphere, in outer space, and underwater, but permitted underground testing.

== Early history ==
Launch Mission Report: Vela - VB (1980) Official de-classified USAF Titan IIIC/Vela satellite information film reel.

In August 1959, several groups focused on detecting underground nuclear tests were established within the US Department of Defense; on September 2, 1959, the Secretary of Defense assigned the research responsibilities to the Advanced Research Projects Agency (ARPA). This initial assignment involved seven tasks: creating a worldwide network of standardized seismological stations; conduct research relating to underground test detection, and on seismic detection stations; conduct nuclear and chemical underground tests to expand knowledge of seismic signatures; and three tasks of a more administrative nature. From the beginning, however, and through 1960, ARPA pressed to add research for testing surface-based, atmospheric, and outer-space detonations, and advocated satellites as a potential platform for such detections.

The Vela Project started as a small budget research program within the DARPA Projects Agencies until 1961 when it was granted greater funding and resources through the authority of the Deputy Assistant Secretary of the Army. This was likely prompted by increased caution over Domestic Nuclear Affairs resulting from the 1961 Goldsboro B-52 crash as well as in anticipation of the 1963 PTB Treaty.

The initial project was limited to the development of the Vela Satellites, but was later expanded and reorganized into three distinct levels of monitoring:

1. Vela Uniform, which was the portion of the project dedicated towards monitoring seismic signals, in order to detect underground and underwater nuclear testing
2. Vela Hotel, which was a continuation of the satellite program to detect nuclear testing solely beyond the atmosphere at an extended range
3. Vela Sierra, which was a set of advanced satellites that were designed to detect testing both in the close reaches of outer space and within the atmosphere of the planet itself.

The project's space and atmospheric divisions operated until the emplacement of satellites in the Defense Support Program (DSP), and were later integrated into the Global Positioning System set of satellites. Currently, all satellites under Project Vela are under the management of IONDS. The seismic division of Project Vela remains in activity today.

In 2020, National Security Science magazine featured an article on Project Vela titled "Cold War watchmen" that contained a description of the project history focusing on the contributions made at Los Alamos National Laboratory, as well as commentary from scientists that worked on the project. In the article astrophysicist Ed Fenimore states "Vela was the prototypical project that made Los Alamos the premier scientific national security laboratory in the world." Data from Project Vela is still used for national security work, and sensors, such as those developed in the project, are still an important part of nuclear detonation detection.

== Vela Hotel and the Initial Vela Project ==
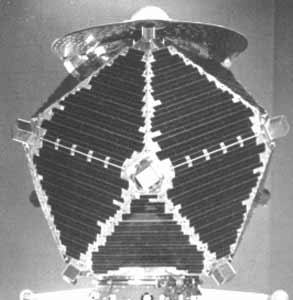
A bird's eye view of the Vela 1 satellite from the Vela Hotel series

There is very little documentation which directly addresses the topic of the initial Vela Project due to its low funding, staffing, resources and status of priority. The first sensor package sent into space, labelled the "Vela Hotel" experiment, was launched aboard the Ranger 1 lunar probe in August 1961 and returned useful data. It is known that the majority of the work done on the initial Vela Project was implemented into Vela Hotel, which monitored outer space for nuclear tests. The Vela Hotel satellite program was primarily developed at Los Alamos Scientific Laboratory, under the supervision of the United States Air Force. A system of X-ray, Neutron, and Gamma-Ray detection monitored for nuclear testing beyond the atmosphere.

The satellites' instrumentation count included 12 X-ray detectors, 18 internal Neutron and Gamma-ray detectors, data transmission equipment to send the information back to Earth, and a set of solar panels which generated 90 watts to power the instrumentation on each satellite. Six of the Vela Hotel series satellites were manufactured, each with a design life of six months, and they were launched a week after the PTB Treaty on October 17, 1963. After deployment these satellites remained operational and online for 5 years before being shut down.

The Vela Hotel series of satellites never detected any weapons being tested in outer space, but they did provide the scientific community with valuable data regarding the mechanics of the Solar System. Importantly, this series of satellites was responsible for discovering Gamma-Ray Bursts, markers of collapsing stars and black holes which are now recognized as the most violent events in the universe. The discovery of Gamma-Ray Bursts enabled scientists with unprecedented ability to map the universe as they augmented existing methods of measuring light to identify deep space objects.

== Vela Sierra and the Advanced Vela Series ==
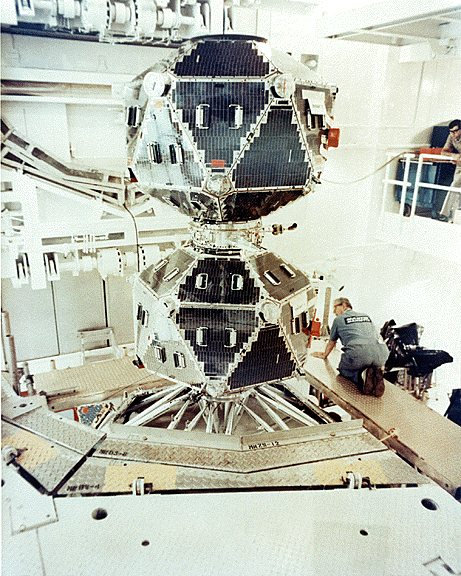
An Advanced Vela series satellite in the Vela Sierra subset

After the completion of development on the first set of Vela Satellites in the Hotel series, DARPA began work on the next phase of the Vela satellite program, namely, on Vela Sierra, which was intended to monitor the atmosphere for covert nuclear tests. Following the deployment of the Hotel series, Los Alamos resumed development on the satellites, this time working towards the Advanced Vela series. These new satellites were created with the intention that they would replace the Hotel Series, as well as function as the satellites that would complete the objectives of the Vela Sierra subset.

The new set of Advanced Vela satellites were equipped with the same detection equipment as the Hotel series, those being the 12 X-ray detectors and 18 internal Neutron and Gamma-Ray detectors, but were also equipped with a new set of instruments. The Advanced Vela series came equipped with two non-imaging photodiode sensors called bhangmeters. These measured light levels over sub-millisecond intervals, and could detect a nuclear explosion to within 3,000 miles. This addition was necessary due to the singular effects that atmospheric nuclear explosions produce, called either the "Double Flash" or the "Double-Humped Curve", which is a pair of flashes of light caused by an explosion, one lasting a millisecond which is quite intense and bright, the other far more prolonged and less intense. This "Double Flash" is what distinguishes atmospheric nuclear explosions from other kinds of explosions in the atmosphere, along with radiation, since the only feasible event that could theoretically produce a double event like an atmospheric nuclear explosion would be something incredibly rare like a meteoroid generated lightning superbolt. However, radiation in the atmosphere is far less easy to calculate, as the Van Allen radiation belts can mask radioactive wavelengths and signatures. The Advanced Vela satellites were additionally fitted with larger solar panels, since the new design required 120 watts as opposed to the Hotel series' 90 watts, as well as electromagnetic sensors for detecting an electromagnetic pulse from an in-atmosphere detonation. The new set of satellites had a design life of 18 months, but instead lasted on average 7 years, with the longest lasting of the set (Vehicle 9) being shut down in 1984, lasting around 15 years before being shut down.

=== Vela incident ===
The most notable event recorded by Vela Sierra was the Vela incident "Double Flash" detected on September 22, 1979, by Vela satellite 6911 near the Prince Edward Islands. It was initially reported as either a malfunction or a magnetospheric event affecting the instruments aboard the satellite. However, nuclear fallout was detected in Australia downwind of the event. United States government assessments at the time that have since been declassified attributed the explosion to a joint Israeli-South African nuclear test.

== Vela Uniform ==
Vela Uniform was the second half of Project Vela that began its development soon after the PTB Treaty was put into effect. Vela Uniform was created with the intention of monitoring seismic activity in order to determine the magnitude and location of any covert nuclear weapons tests beneath the surface of the earth. Underground tests have been illegal under international law since the widespread ratification of the Comprehensive Nuclear-Test-Ban Treaty (CTBT). Vela Uniform can also detect underwater tests conducted at any point on the Earth's surface. The methods DARPA used to create a system with which they could determine the difference between a regular seismic event and an underground covert nuclear test involved the rigorous measurement of seven nuclear tests in the continental United States, as well as numerous smaller experiments using conventional high explosives rather than nuclear explosions.

Test name	Date	Location	Yield	Test series
Shoal	1963-10-26	Sand Springs Range 39.20012°N 118.38124°W	12 kt	Niblick
Salmon	1964-10-22	Salmon Site 31.14229°N 89.57001°W	5.3 kt	Whetstone
Long Shot	1965-10-29	Amchitka Island, Alaska 51.43709°N 179.18032°E	80 kt	Flintlock
Sterling	1966-12-03	Salmon Site 31.14229°N 89.57001°W	380 t	Latchkey
Scroll	1968-04-23	Nevada Test Site 37.33767°N 116.37647°W	< 20 kt	Crosstie
Diamond Dust	1970-05-12	Nevada Test Site 37.0104°N 116.20277°W	< 20 kt	Mandrel
Diamond Mine	1971-07-01	Nevada Test Site 37.01148°N 116.20427°W	< 20 kt	Grommet

Over time, Vela Uniform's methods and techniques for measuring seismic activity to determine the existence and location of covert underground nuclear tests have improved, and stations for seismographical monitoring exist all around the world. This has had the effect of giving more nations the ability to better understand their own country's seismic activities, and has given more and more countries access to aid in situations of earthquakes, tsunamis, and other such events, as well as ensuring the detection of any future covert underground nuclear tests.
