= Tahoe–Pyramid Trail =

Planned trail in Lake Tahoe, USA

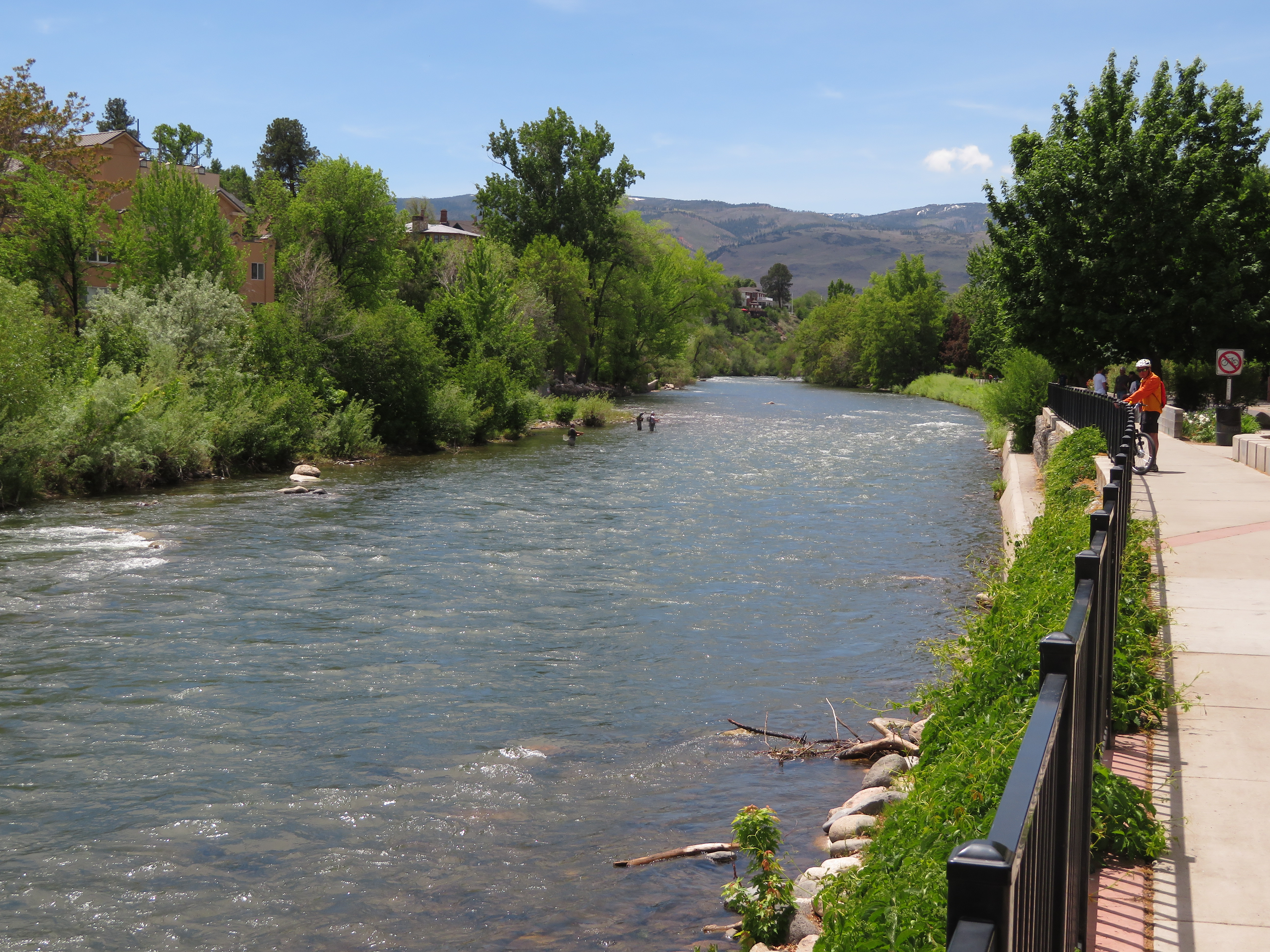
The trail between Sparks en Reno, Nevada.

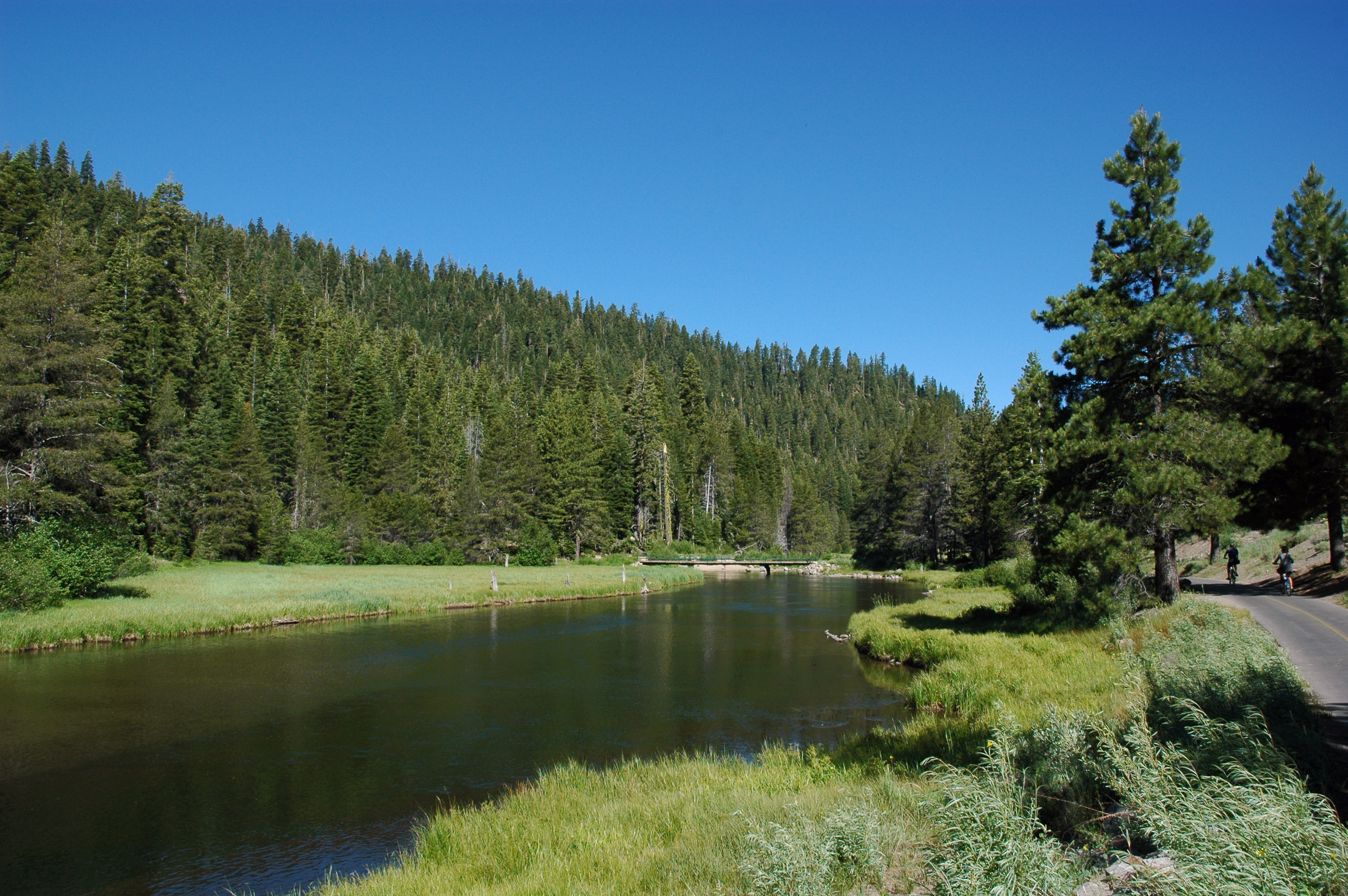
The path runs along the Truckee River, here near Lake Tahoe.

The Tahoe–Pyramid Trail is a planned 114-mile (183 km) long-distance pedestrian and bicycle trail which will run between Lake Tahoe and Pyramid Lake, principally along the routing of the Truckee River.

== History ==
The effort to construct a pedestrian path between the two connected lakes was started in November 2003, undertaken at first by Janet Phillips. The organization responsible for planning and construction of the trail, Tahoe–Pyramid Bikeway, was formed in 2005 (the current name was adopted in 2018 to reflect its multi-use function).

The western portion between Tahoe and the Reno–Sparks area opened to hikers on October 5, 2019, completing the California section of the trail. As of October 2019, two sections are not complete: Vista Blvd to Mustang and USA Parkway to Wadsworth. The Porrtion to Mustang is blocked by landowner issues as of January 2018.
