= John C. Carpenter =

John C. Carpenter may refer to:

- John Carpenter (athlete) (John Condict Carpenter, 1884–1933), American athlete
- John C. Carpenter (politician) (1930–2016), American businessman, rancher, and politician
