= Old Bridge Ranch =

Former legal brothel in Nevada, U.S.

- Location in Nevada
- Location: Sparks, Nevada
- Coordinates: 39.5093261°N 119.632547°W
- Owner: David Burgess

Construction
- Opened: 1967
- Closed: 2008

The Old Bridge Ranch was a legal brothel near Sparks, operating east of the city, in Storey County, Nevada, United States, that was open from 1967 to the summer of 2008.

== History ==
Built on the site of the original Mustang Ranch It featured prints by Olivia De Berardinis, Salvador Dalí and Gottfried Helnwein on the walls. The owner, David Burgess, was a nephew of Joe Conforte, and managed the Mustang Ranch between 1979 and 1989.

In 1998, Burgess's brothel operators license was revoked on the grounds he was a member of the Hells Angels. The Supreme Court of Nevada ruled that being a Hells Angel didn't violate any conditions of the licensing so his licensing was returned.

After the Mustang's closure in 1999, many of the prostitutes came to work at the Old Bridge Ranch, and Burgess Changed the name to the Mustang. Following a long legal battle with Lance Gilman, who had brought the Mustang's building and transported them to his Wild Horse Adult Resort & Spa, it was ruled Gilman had the right to use the Mustang name, so the brothel reverted to the Old Bridge Ranch name.

== Closure ==
In 2008, Burgess's RV was stopped in Wyoming by police. A search of the vehicle uncovered drugs and child pornography. Burgess was found guilty of possessing and transporting child pornography and he was jailed for 15 years. Storey County officials changed the brothel licensing laws to prevent Burgess's non-licensed associates running the brothel and the brothel closed.

== See also ==
- Prostitution in Nevada
- List of brothels in Nevada
