= Federal Building and Post Office (Fallon, Nevada) =

- U.S. National Register of Historic Places
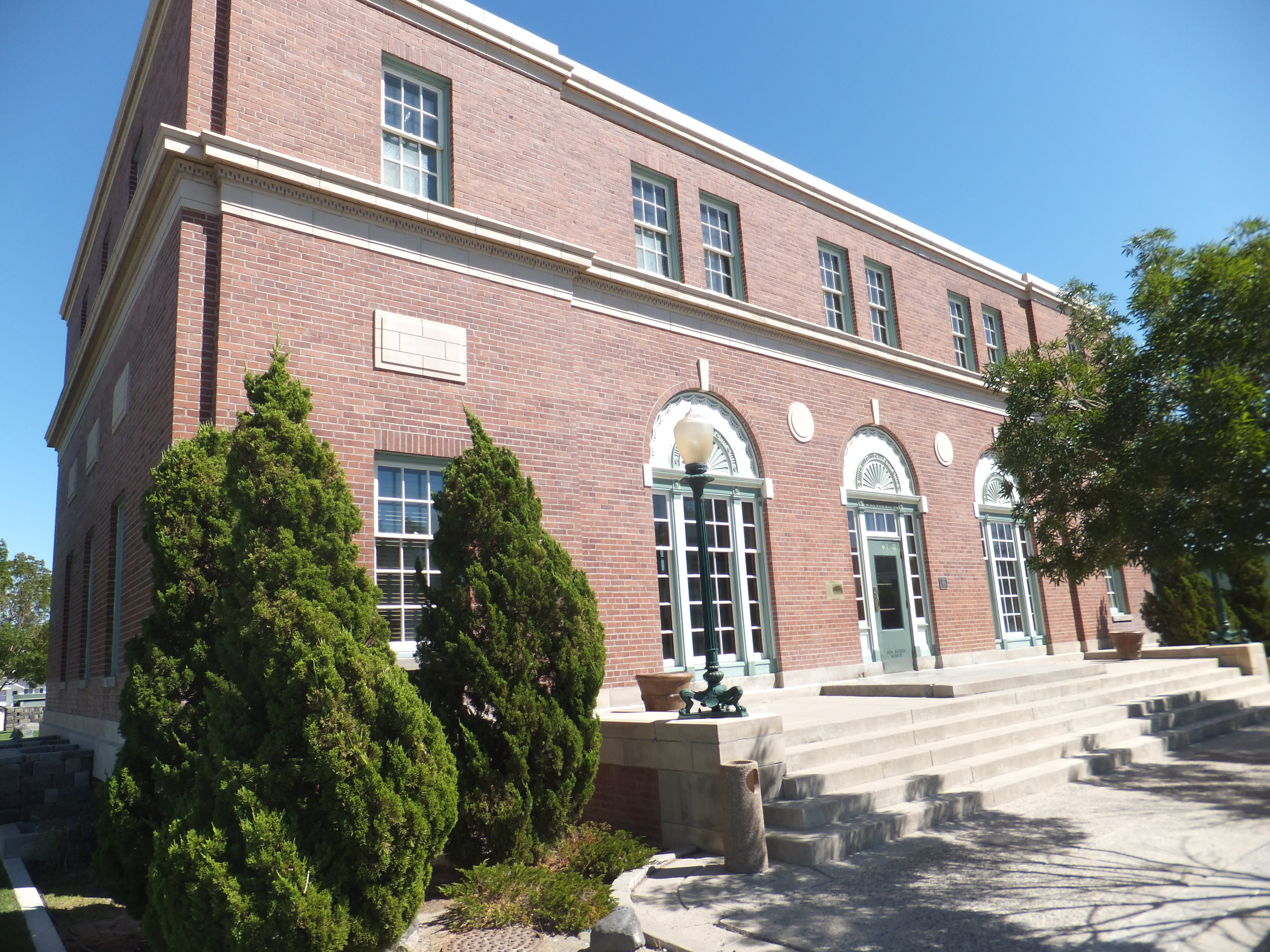

- Location within Nevada Location within the United States
- Location: 90 N. Maine St., Fallon, Nevada
- Coordinates: 39°28′34″N 118°46′32″W
- Area: less than one acre
- Built: 1928-29
- Architect: Wetmore, James A.; Simon, Louis A. et al.
- Architectural style: Classical Revival
- MPS: US Post Offices in Nevada MPS
- NRHP reference No.: 06000109
- Added to NRHP: March 8, 2006

The Federal Building and Post Office, also known as the Old Post Office or Fallon Post Office, is located at 90 N. Maine St. in Fallon, Nevada. It was built around 1928-29 and is a Classical Revival-style building of a standard design. It was listed on the National Register of Historic Places in 2006.
