= Ash Meadows Sky Ranch =

Legal brothel in Nevada near Shoshone, California

Coordinates: 36.35938°N 116.29588°W

Ash Meadows Sky Ranch was a brothel in Nevada near the ghost town of Rhyolite, Nevada. The procurer Vickie Starr said of the establishment “We were six prostitutes in the middle of the desert, isolated from the rest of the world, screwing horny and frustrated men for money. That was our life and as far as we were concerned it was as normal as Rice Krispies.

Built as a motel and restaurant, the Ash Meadows Lodge, a brothel was later added. Located on a gravel road 2.5 miles from the California border, it was one of the first three brothels to be licensed by Nye County in 1958. Vickie Starr brought the brothel in 1971 after selling Vickie’s Star Ranch in Beatty. She changed the name to Ash Meadows Sky Ranch, sky coming from the brothel's airstrip. The ranch was one of the most impressive brothels in Nevada during the period, featuring a swimming pool, restaurant, hotel, and golf course. A few years later Nye County declined to renew the brothel license because, due to its remote location, it was costly for the medical examiner to visit weekly for the prostitutes check-ups. The brothel closed. Several scenes from the 1987 film Cherry 2000 were shot at the disused brothel.

== See also ==
- List of brothels in Nevada
