= Salmon Creek Railroad =

Narrow-gauge railway in Fallon, Nevada, US

Coordinates: 39.505156°N 118.7716662°W

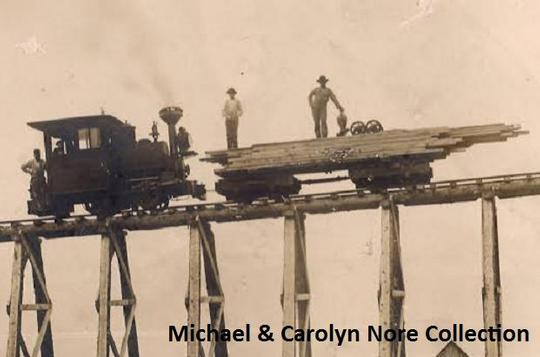
- H.K. Porter No 1421 of the Berners Bay Mining and Milling Co.

Technical
- Line length: 500 feet (150 m)
- Track gauge: 3 ft (914 mm)

The Salmon Creek Railroad was a 500-foot-long (150 m) heritage narrow-gauge railway in Fallon, Nevada, owned by Jim Walsh.

== History ==
James Paul (Jim) Walsh, Jr. (born on 21 October 1930 in Inglewood, California; died 10. June 2018) was executive vice president of the J-V Corporation. He was interested in anything related to railroads and built, after he had moved to Golden Valley, Nevada a model railroad layout of the Feather River Route. He owned a collection of three narrow gauge steam locomotives, which he had imported from Alaska, to save them from being scrapped. For these he built a locomotive shed and a short piece of track in Fallon.

== Locomotives ==
The H.K. Porter steam locomotive with works number 1421 was made in 1892 for Berner's Bay Mining & Manufacturing Co. as their No 1. It was called Seward. Previously it had been used in 1912 on the Salmon Creek Dam Railroad and had been transferred in 1913 to Annex Creek, where it was taken out of services in 1915. Jim Walsh acquired it in 1976 and restored it into an operable condition. The cylinders were 7 × 12 inch (178 × 305 mm), and the wheels had a diameter of probably 24 inch (610 mm). It was occasionally demonstrated at Nevada State Railroad Museum in Carson, Nevada.

Type	Gauge	Name	Manufacturer	Works-No, date of construction	Previous owner	Condition
0-4-0T	3 ft (914 mm)	Seward	H. K. Porter	Nr. 1421, Nov. 1892	Berners Bay Mining & Milling Co. and Annex Creek	Operable
0-4-2T	2 ft (610 mm)		H. K. Porter	1392	Albany Street Railway, Brown & Rush Mine	Mothballed
0-4-0T	2 ft (610 mm)		Davenport		Treadwell Mine	Under restoration
