= Donna's Ranch =

Legal brothel in Wells, Nevada

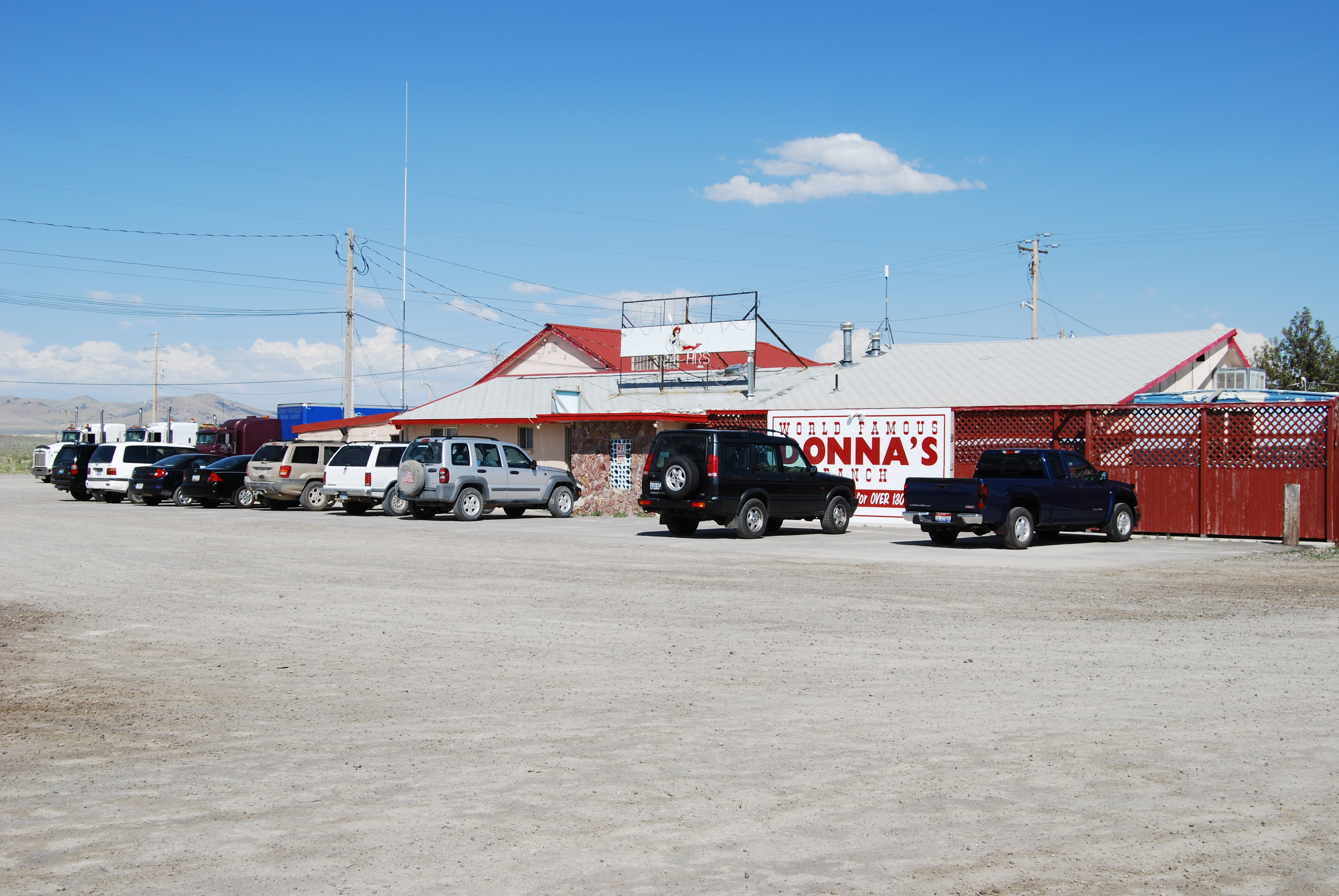
- Donna's Ranch in 2007

- Location in Nevada
- Former names: The Calico Club; Donna's Calico Club; Chardon's Club
- Address: 8th Street
- Location: Wells, Nevada
- Coordinates: 41°06′38″N 114°57′34″W
- Owner: Geoff Arnold

Construction
- Opened: 1867

Donna's Ranch is a legal, licensed brothel located in Wells, Nevada, United States. Donna's Ranch is situated on 8th Street in Wells. The ranch traces its history back to 1867 and is owned by Geoff Arnold. The boxer Jack Dempsey was a previous owner.

== History ==
The ranch was originally established near the railroad to serve the men constructing the nearby railroad. Wells was a major cattle pick-up point on the Central Pacific Railway. Cowboys who had driven the cattle to the railroad celebrated in the ranch. Local ranchers would give a few cattle to Donna's for credit against future visits.

During the Great Depression, the ranch donated food and money to the people of Wells.

It has undergone several name changes and has been previously known as The Calico Club, Donna's Calico Club, and Chardon's Club.

Arnold purchased the ranch from Evelyn and Ken Merrill in 1999 for $1,000,000.

On February 21, 2008, the ranch survived a 6.0 earthquake, though the interior of the building was trashed. The building was also extensively damaged in a flood on February 7, 2017.

They operated two locations, however the one in Battle Mountain, Nevada in Lander County, closed in 2011. It was subsequently re-opened by new owners under its previous name of The Calico Club.

== See also ==
- Prostitution in Nevada
- List of brothels in Nevada
