= Salt Wells, Nevada =

- Ghost town
- Location within the state of Nevada Salt Wells, Nevada (the United States)
- Coordinates: 39°15′40″N 118°27′21″W
- Country: United States
- State: Nevada
- County: Churchill
- Elevation: 3,888 ft (1,185 m)

Salt Wells is the site of a former brothel and a possible future route of Interstate 11. Salt Wells is located on the northern edge of the Salt Wells Marsh, 15 miles southeast of Fallon, Nevada on U.S. Route 50 near Sand Mountain.

== History ==
Borax was discovered by William Throop at Salt Wells. In 1870, the American Borax Co. built a borax works there. In 1871, the plant was in operation, along with a smaller plant, producing 20 tons per month, though production ceased in a few years due to the low grade of the deposit. The borax deposit consisted of about 400 acres with a borax content of 10%, sometimes reaching 30%.

In the 1920s and 30s, Salt Wells had a bar and a gas station.

Salt Wells was the site of Salt Wells Villa, a brothel in operation from 1975. In 1977, the brothel was firebombed by the wife of the Churchill County Sheriff, Mildred Banovich. Author William Least Heat-Moon visited the brothel in the spring of 1978 during the cross-country journey chronicled in his 1982 travel memoir Blue Highways, describing the brief encounter in Part 5, Chapter 10. The brothel closed in 2004. In 2007, the brothel was destroyed in a fire.

In 2009, the Salt Wells Geothermal Plant was opened south of Salt Wells.

In March 2018, it was reported that the Nevada Department of Transportation was considering Salt Wells as a possible route from Tonopah, Nevada to Interstate 80; the new route would be part of Interstate 11.
