= Fallon, Nevada =

City in Nevada, United States

- City
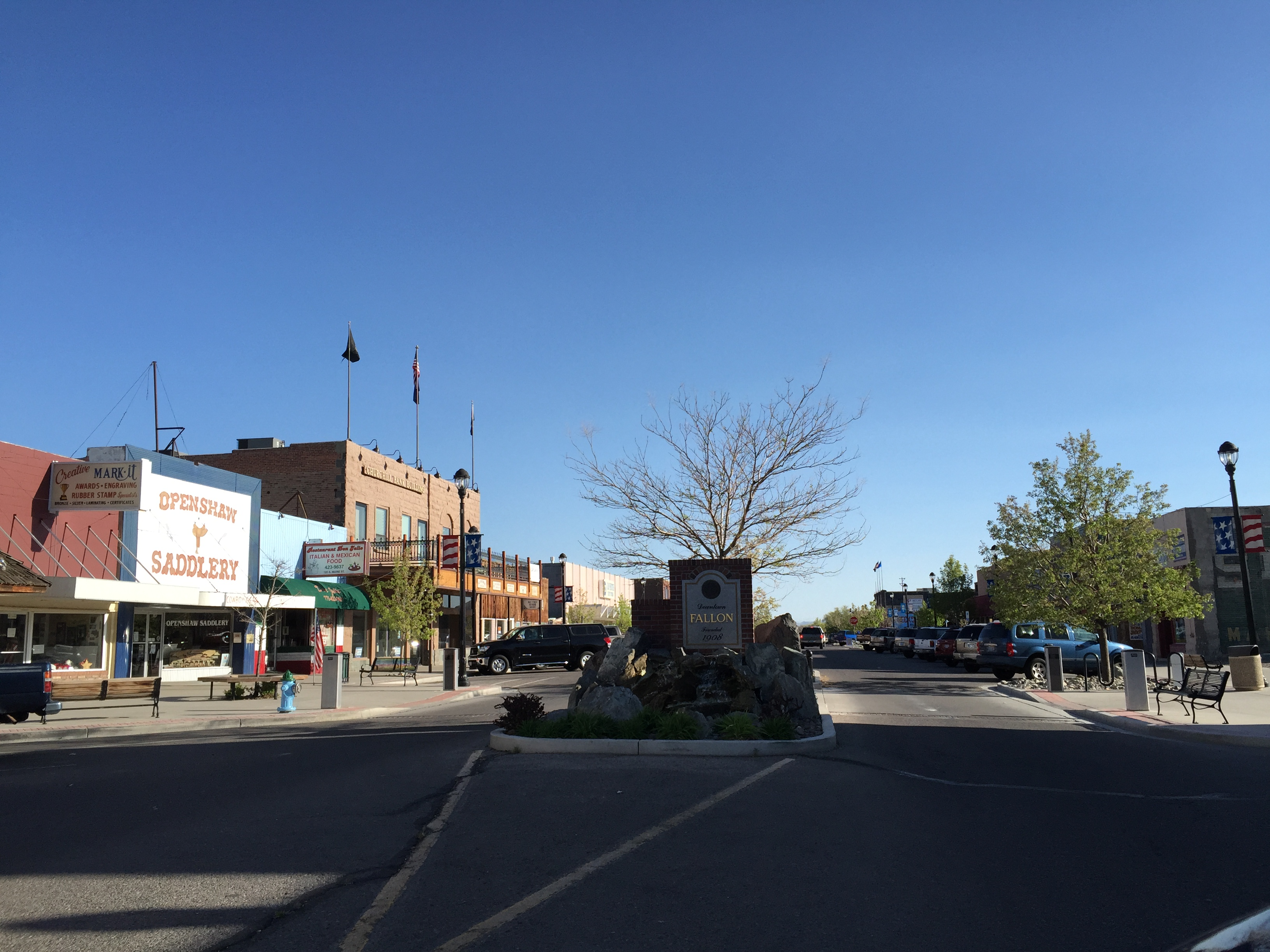
- Maine Street in Fallon

- Flag Logo
- Nickname: The Oasis of Nevada
- Location of Fallon and Churchill County, Nevada

- Location in Nevada Location in the United States
- Coordinates: 39°28′05″N 118°45′44″W
- Country: United States
- State: Nevada
- County: Churchill
- Founded: July 24, 1896; 130 years ago
- Incorporated: 1908; 118 years ago
- Named for: Michael Fallon

Government
  - Mayor: Ken Tedford (R)

Area
  - Total: 3.71 sq mi (9.61 km^{2})
  - Land: 3.71 sq mi (9.61 km^{2})
  - Water: 0 sq mi (0.00 km^{2})
- Elevation: 3,967 ft (1,209 m)

Population (2020)
  - Total: 9,327
  - Density: 2,513.1/sq mi (970.33/km^{2})
- Time zone: UTC−8 (PST)
  - Summer (DST): UTC−7 (PDT)
- ZIP codes: 89406, 89407, 89496
- Area code: 775
- FIPS code: 32-24100
- GNIS feature ID: 2410481
- Website: www.fallonnevada.gov

Fallon is a city in Churchill County in the U.S. state of Nevada. The population was 9,327 at the time of the 2020 census. Fallon is the county seat of Churchill County and is located in the Lahontan Valley. Fallon is known for being home to Naval Air Station Fallon, located southeast of the city.

== History ==
The community was first populated during the California Gold Rush, because multiple would-be Forty-niners stopped after crossing the Carson River.

Donovan Mitchell

The town and post office were established on July 24, 1896, in a little shack belonging to Michael Fallon and Eliza Fallon, who operated a ranch at the site. Shortly afterwards, Jim Richards later operated a store near the post office.

The town was officially incorporated in 1908.

Lincoln Highway, the first transcontinental thoroughfare, passes through Fallon from east to west, following the original Pony Express trail. Today it is designated U.S. Highway 50, and eastward from Fallon is popularly known as The Loneliest Road in America, as it passes through only two towns and one small city between Fallon and the Utah state line, over 400 miles distant.

When U.S. Highway 95 (stretching between the U.S. borders with Canada and Mexico) was laid out in the 1930s, the highway north of town met Highway 50 at the northern end of what was then the town center (Maine Street). To avoid forcing traffic through town, there is a four-block "dogleg" on Highway 50 separating the north and south legs of Highway 95.

While the city has expanded greatly over the years, the "old town" area is several blocks of Maine Street. Many of the buildings here date back to the early 20th century, including the historic Fallon Theater, which is still in operation as of 2025.

Naval Air Station Fallon, built in 1942, is southeast of the city center. Since 1996, NAS Fallon has been home to the U.S. Navy's Navy Fighter Weapons School (popularly known as TOPGUN), using several flight training areas and practice ranges in the area.

On June 16, 2019, downtown (Maine Street) Fallon was listed in the National Register of Historic Places.

== Geography ==
Fallon is located in western Churchill County at the geographic coordinates 39°28′22″N 118°46′44″W (39.472792, −118.778826). It is in the Lahontan Valley, a former lakebed into which flows the Carson River, which passes north of the city.

According to the United States Census Bureau, Fallon has a total area of 3.65 square miles (9.45 km^{2}), of which 3.63 square miles (9.41 km^{2}) is land and 0.02 square miles (0.05 km^{2}), or 0.49%, is water.

=== Climate ===
Fallon experiences a cool arid climate (Köppen BWk), with hot summers and cold winters. Due to Fallon's elevation and aridity, the diurnal temperature variation is quite substantial, especially in the summer months. Summer days can be hot, but temperatures are cooler than in deserts such as the Mojave, Sonoran, and Chihuahuan, due to Fallon's altitude and higher latitude. In the winter, daytime temperatures top freezing on all but eight afternoons, but nights can be bitterly cold, with 2.9 mornings falling to 0 °F or −17.8 °C and a record low of −27 °F (−32.8 °C) on February 6, 1989.

Fallon's climate is quite dry, due to its location in the rain shadow of the Sierra Nevada, with only half as much precipitation as Minden marginally further west, and only one-eleventh as much as Grass Valley on the other side of the Sierra. The wettest "rain year" was from July 1976 to June 1977 with 9.63 inches or 244.6 millimeters and the driest from July 1949 to June 1950 with 1.00 inch (25.4 mm). The most precipitation in one month has been 3.38 inches or 85.9 millimeters in May 1995, and the most in one day 1.69 inches or 42.9 millimeters, which occurred twice on January 1, 1910 and May 28, 1913.

Snowfall is extremely light because of the aridity: the most in one season is only 26.6 inches (0.68 m) between July 1988 and June 1989 and numerous seasons have passed without measurable snow. The most snow in one month has been 20.9 inches or 0.53 meters in January 1916.

Fallon can experience heavy fog in winter, known as pogonip.

Climate data for Fallon, Nevada, 1991–2020 normals, extremes 1903–present
Month	Jan	Feb	Mar	Apr	May	Jun	Jul	Aug	Sep	Oct	Nov	Dec	Year
Record high °F (°C)	71 (22)	78 (26)	84 (29)	90 (32)	102 (39)	106 (41)	108 (42)	105 (41)	106 (41)	92 (33)	81 (27)	72 (22)	108 (42)
Mean maximum °F (°C)	60.1 (15.6)	65.8 (18.8)	75.2 (24.0)	81.8 (27.7)	90.2 (32.3)	97.3 (36.3)	101.9 (38.8)	99.4 (37.4)	95.1 (35.1)	84.8 (29.3)	71.2 (21.8)	61.8 (16.6)	102.7 (39.3)
Mean daily maximum °F (°C)	46.0 (7.8)	52.4 (11.3)	60.7 (15.9)	66.1 (18.9)	74.8 (23.8)	85.1 (29.5)	94.2 (34.6)	91.8 (33.2)	83.3 (28.5)	69.8 (21.0)	55.9 (13.3)	45.2 (7.3)	68.8 (20.4)
Daily mean °F (°C)	33.0 (0.6)	37.8 (3.2)	44.6 (7.0)	49.8 (9.9)	58.4 (14.7)	66.9 (19.4)	74.7 (23.7)	72.0 (22.2)	63.6 (17.6)	51.9 (11.1)	40.2 (4.6)	32.1 (0.1)	52.1 (11.2)
Mean daily minimum °F (°C)	20.0 (−6.7)	23.3 (−4.8)	28.5 (−1.9)	33.5 (0.8)	41.9 (5.5)	48.7 (9.3)	55.3 (12.9)	52.3 (11.3)	43.9 (6.6)	34.0 (1.1)	24.5 (−4.2)	19.0 (−7.2)	35.4 (1.9)
Mean minimum °F (°C)	6.9 (−13.9)	11.7 (−11.3)	15.6 (−9.1)	21.8 (−5.7)	30.0 (−1.1)	36.1 (2.3)	46.0 (7.8)	43.5 (6.4)	33.8 (1.0)	20.9 (−6.2)	12.7 (−10.7)	6.1 (−14.4)	1.9 (−16.7)
Record low °F (°C)	−25 (−32)	−27 (−33)	1 (−17)	13 (−11)	20 (−7)	27 (−3)	35 (2)	33 (1)	21 (−6)	6 (−14)	−1 (−18)	−21 (−29)	−27 (−33)
Average precipitation inches (mm)	0.63 (16)	0.47 (12)	0.50 (13)	0.45 (11)	0.68 (17)	0.36 (9.1)	0.12 (3.0)	0.15 (3.8)	0.19 (4.8)	0.40 (10)	0.43 (11)	0.39 (9.9)	4.77 (120.6)
Average snowfall inches (cm)	1.8 (4.6)	0.7 (1.8)	0.3 (0.76)	0.0 (0.0)	0.0 (0.0)	0.0 (0.0)	0.0 (0.0)	0.0 (0.0)	0.0 (0.0)	0.0 (0.0)	0.3 (0.76)	1.4 (3.6)	4.5 (11.52)
Average precipitation days (≥ 0.01 in)	5.0	4.4	3.7	3.4	4.3	2.6	1.5	1.3	1.6	2.8	2.8	4.1	37.5
Average snowy days (≥ 0.1 in)	1.0	0.5	0.3	0.1	0.0	0.0	0.0	0.0	0.0	0.0	0.1	0.8	2.8
Source 1: NOAA
Source 2: WRCC

== Demographics ==
Historical population
Census	Pop.	Note	%±
1900	741		—
1910	1,753		136.6%
1920	1,758		0.3%
1930	1,911		8.7%
1940	2,400		25.6%
1950	2,734		13.9%
1960	2,959		8.2%
1970	4,262		44.0%
1980	6,438		51.1%
1990	7,536		17.1%
2000	8,606		14.2%
2010	8,606		0.0%
2020	9,327		8.4%
U.S. Decennial Census

=== 2020 census ===
As of the 2020 census, Fallon had a population of 9,327. The median age was 35.1 years. 23.7% of residents were under the age of 18 and 17.5% of residents were 65 years of age or older. For every 100 females there were 97.6 males, and for every 100 females age 18 and over there were 94.7 males age 18 and over.

100.0% of residents lived in urban areas, while 0.0% lived in rural areas.

There were 3,939 households in Fallon, of which 30.3% had children under the age of 18 living in them. Of all households, 35.1% were married-couple households, 24.9% were households with a male householder and no spouse or partner present, and 31.0% were households with a female householder and no spouse or partner present. About 35.8% of all households were made up of individuals and 14.7% had someone living alone who was 65 years of age or older.

There were 4,196 housing units, of which 6.1% were vacant. The homeowner vacancy rate was 2.5% and the rental vacancy rate was 4.0%.

Racial composition as of the 2020 census
Race	Number	Percent
White	6,644	71.2%
Black or African American	329	3.5%
American Indian and Alaska Native	303	3.2%
Asian	429	4.6%
Native Hawaiian and Other Pacific Islander	57	0.6%
Some other race	477	5.1%
Two or more races	1,088	11.7%
Hispanic or Latino (of any race)	1,363	14.6%

=== 2000 census ===
As of the census of 2000, there were 7,536 people, 3,004 households, and 1,877 families residing in the city. The population density was 2,474.1 inhabitants per square mile (955.3/km^{2}). There were 3,336 housing units at an average density of 1,095.2 per square mile (422.9/km^{2}). The racial makeup of the city was 76.5% White, 2.0% African American, 3.0% Native American, 4.7% Asian, 0.3% Pacific Islander, 0.3% from other races, and 3.3% from two or more races. Hispanic or Latino of any race were 9.9% of the population.

There were 3,004 households, out of which 35.4% had children under the age of 18 living with them, 42.7% were married couples living together, 15.3% had a female householder with no husband present, and 37.5% were non-families. 30.7% of all households were made up of individuals, and 11.4% had someone living alone who was 65 years of age or older. The average household size was 2.45 and the average family size was 3.06.

In the city, the population was spread out, with 28.4% under the age of 18, 10.3% from 18 to 24, 29.7% from 25 to 44, 19.4% from 45 to 64, and 12.2% who were 65 years of age or older. The median age was 32 years. For every 100 females, there were 95.7 males. For every 100 females age 18 and over, there were 91.5 males.

The median income for a household in the city was $35,935, and the median income for a family was $41,433. Males had a median income of $35,356 versus $22,818 for females. The per capita income for the city was $16,919. About 9.5% of families and 12.6% of the population were below the poverty line, including 15.6% of those under age 18 and 10.3% of those age 65 or over.

=== Public health ===
Between 1997 and 2003, the Fallon community experienced an unusually high incidence of childhood leukemia. In response, the U.S. Senate held the Field Hearing Before the Committee on Environment and Public Works during the winter of 2001. Nevada Assemblywoman Merle A. Berman was a participant. According to the minutes of that hearing, on February 14, Berman pressed for answers to ascertain why certain individuals, but not others were selected for the panel of experts chosen to investigate the leukemia clusters and "why the Federal Government was not involved in the testing." And on April 12, Berman obtained this testimony from one of the medical experts in attendance:

Dr. Thomas Sinks, the associate director for science at the National Center for Environmental Health at the Centers for Disease Control clarified that nobody ever developed cancer because of chances. There was always a cause, and the challenge in Fallon would be to discover the common denominator among the 11 children. The unifying cause was not yet known, but eventually science would identify the commonality. The probability of the Fallon cluster being a chance event was described by Dr. Sinks as being unlikely.

In 2011, epidemiologists at the University of California, Berkeley theorized that the "space-time patterning" of the leukemia cluster was "consistent with the involvement of an infectious disease," and that a "possible mode of transmission" was "by means of a vector" since mosquitoes were "abundant in Churchill County outside of the urban area of Fallon."

== Education ==
The city is served by the Churchill County School District. Churchill County High School is the main high school and also caters to students in rural areas outside the city. Western Nevada College has a campus in Fallon.

There is a charter school, Oasis Academy.

Fallon has a public library, the Churchill County Library.

== Nuclear weapons testing ==
Los Alamos National Laboratory, in conjunction with the Department of Defense, conducted an underground nuclear test 28 miles (45 km) southeast of Fallon at 5 p.m. on October 26, 1963. Named Project Shoal, the 12.5-kiloton detonation was part of the Vela Uniform program. The device exploded at a depth of 1,205 feet (367 m) below ground surface. The site is located in Gote Flat in the Sand Springs Range.

Access to the Project Shoal Area is unrestricted. Access to the area is by Highway 50, Nevada Highway 839, then to an improved gravel road to the site.

== In popular culture ==
- The Go-Getter, starring Zooey Deschanel and Jena Malone, mentions Fallon many times and even brings up Fallon's annual Heart 'O Gold Cantaloupe Festival. Malone's character lives in Fallon, and parts of the movie were filmed in and around Fallon.

== Notable people ==
- John C. Carpenter, rancher, businessman, and politician, was born in Fallon
- Harvey Dahl, St. Louis Rams a former offensive lineman, was born in Fallon
- Luella Kirkbride Drumm, former member of the Nevada Assembly
- Wuzzie George, Northern Paiute craftswoman and recorder of indigenous lifeways
- Martin Heinrich, U.S. senator for New Mexico
- Meaghan Martin, actress
- Joshua Mauga, a Fallon native, played for the Kansas City Chiefs

== Twin towns ==
Fallon is twinned with the following towns:

- Vani, Georgia

== See also ==
- Fallon Municipal Airport
- Salmon Creek Railroad
- Spirit Cave mummy
- Federal Building and Post Office (Fallon, Nevada)
