= John C. Carpenter (politician) =

American politician

Member of the Nevada General Assembly for the 33rd district
- In office November 1986 – November 2010

Personal details
- Born: October 13, 1930 Fallon, Nevada, U.S.
- Died: November 19, 2016 (aged 86) Elko, Nevada, U.S.
- Party: Republican
- Spouse: Roseann Slater
- Children: 7
- Profession: rancher, real estate broker, businessman

John C. Carpenter (October 13, 1930 – November 19, 2016), was an American businessman, rancher, and politician.

Born in Fallon, Nevada, Carpenter graduated from White Pine High School in Ely, Nevada. In 1957, he bought a sheep ranch in Elko, Nevada, where he lived with his wife and family. He served as president of the Nevada Woolgrowers Association. Carpenter served on the Elko County Commission. From 1987 to 2011, Carpenter served as a Republican member of the Nevada Assembly. He was a rancher, real estate broker, and businessman.
