= Sand Springs Range =

Mountain range in Churchill and Mineral counties in Nevada, United States

Coordinates: 39°06′29″N 118°21′00″W

The Sand Springs Range is a 10-mile-long (16 km) mountain range located in within the Great Basin in Churchill and Mineral counties in Nevada, United States.

== Description ==
The range separates Salt Wells (to the west) from Fairview Valley (to the east). To the north, it is separated from the Stillwater Range by Sand Springs Pass. To the south is Gabbs Valley.

The Sand Springs Range was the site of Project Shoal, an underground nuclear test conducted as part of the Vela Uniform program. Shoal was a 12-kiloton device which was detonated 1,211 feet (369 m) below ground on October 26, 1963. As the area experienced a series of large earthquakes in 1954, seismic traces for the events could be compared to help differentiate future Soviet underground nuclear tests from earthquakes. The site is unrestricted and unmarked. No surface crater was formed, and the casual observer will find little evidence that the event ever took place.

The Sand Springs Range also has several large military radar installations. These are associated with the bombing range in Fairview Valley, the electronic warfare range in Dixie Valley, and Naval Air Station Fallon.

The most prominent peak in the Sand Springs Range is Big Kasock Mountain, at an elevation of 7,150 feet (2,180 m).

== See also ==
- List of mountain ranges of Nevada
