= Mustang Ranch =

Legal brothel in Sparks, Nevada

- Location in Nevada
- Former names: Mustang Ranch Brothel
- Address: 1011 Wild Horse Canyon Drive
- Location: Sparks, Nevada
- Coordinates: 39°32′40.78″N 119°33′22.43″W
- Owner: Lance Gilman

Construction
- Opened: 1976
- Renovated: 2005

Website
- www.mustangranchbrothel.com

The Mustang Ranch is a brothel in Storey County, Nevada, about 20 miles (32 km) east of Reno.

Under the past and original owner Joe Conforte, Mustang Ranch Brothel, the precursor to Mustang Ranch, became Nevada's first licensed brothel in 1971. This eventually led to the legalization of brothels in 10 of 17 counties in the state. Mustang Ranch opened to the public in 1971 and was America's largest brothel with 166 acres (67 ha), and the most profitable.

The Mustang Ranch was forfeited to the federal government in 1999 following Conforte's convictions for tax fraud, racketeering and other crimes.

The Mustang Ranch was auctioned off by the United States government on eBay. Lance Gilman’s bid was the last bid for $145,100 and he reopened the Mustang Ranch 5 miles away.

== Operation ==
The courtesans lived on the ranch during their entire shift, which lasted from several days to several weeks. In the early 1970s, the women were lingerie clad. Conforte claimed in 1971 that the age range of the working girls was 18 to 35. Conforte could provide women of any age, race or size on request of the high rollers. The shifts lasted 12 hours per day. Clothing and salon services were provided by vendors who traveled from as far away as San Francisco and by non-courtesan employees who lived in Sparks, Nevada. Doctors came to the ranch to do pelvic exams and check for sexually transmitted diseases. Although many of the women working were from Reno or Sparks, many commuted from Sacramento and San Francisco. Others came from all parts of the country. Women not working on the ranch were not allowed in. Owner Joe Conforte allowed "out parties" for high rollers to take the women to hotels in Reno.

Las Vegas reporter Colin McKinlay visited the Mustang Ranch to do one of the first reports ever allowed by Mustang management. He wrote, "The women were the most beautiful of any fantasy of man."

As in other Nevada brothels, customers were buzzed in through the parlor door. Once in, they chose a woman from a lineup in a lobby, and negotiated prices and services. She checked the penis for any open sores or signs of venereal disease and tested the pre-ejaculatory fluid. A short negotiation was made as to the type of "party" the customer wanted. The house received half of anything the women made. After the negotiations were over, the courtesan collected the money and deposited it with a cashier.

Joe Conforte in 1986 wrote his autobiography and history of the Mustang Ranch, with Nevada writer, David W. Toll.

== History ==
The brothel started out as a set of four double-wide trailers, run by Richard Bennett and initially called Mustang Bridge Ranch. Joe Conforte (1925-2019), (Look gave his age as 48 in 1971) who had owned several brothels in Nevada together with his wife, Sally Burgess Conforte aka Jesse E. Conforte (1917–1992) since October 1955, took over the Mustang Bridge Ranch in 1967. At this time, brothels were not explicitly illegal in Nevada, but some had been closed as public nuisances.

Conforte gained political influence in Storey County (by renting out cheap trailers and telling the renters how to vote) and persuaded county officials to pass a brothel-licensing ordinance, which came into effect in 1971. Joe Conforte was featured in Look, June 29, 1971, the article titled "Legal Prostitution Spreads in Nevada'" by Gerald Astor, Look Senior Editor. Joe was on the cover of Rolling Stone magazine November 23, 1972.

The Nevada Supreme Court upheld the right of a county to legalize prostitution, and several counties followed suit. Conforte converted the trailers into a permanent structure with 54 bedrooms.

In 1976, the world class boxer Oscar Bonavena (1942–1976), who was a former friend of Conforte's and probably had an affair with his wife Sally, was shot dead at the ranch by Conforte's bodyguard.

In 1982, Mustang II with 48 bedrooms was built a hundred meters away from Mustang I. A bit smaller and not as luxurious as Mustang I, mostly new women and women demoted from Mustang I for some infraction worked there. Mustang 1 was subsequently rebranded as the "World Famous Mustang Ranch".

=== Forfeiture and sale following tax fraud ===
After losing a tax fraud case in 1990, the brothel was closed for three months and auctioned off. Conforte fled the United States to Brazil. The brothel was bought by a holding company and stayed open. After that company and the brothel's manager (a former county commissioner) lost a federal fraud, racketeering and conspiracy case in 1999, the Mustang Ranch was closed and forfeited to the federal government. That same year, the Brazil Supreme Court ruled Conforte could not be extradited.

In 2002, the brothel's furniture, paintings and accessories were auctioned off. The Bureau of Land Management sold the Ranch's pink stucco structures on eBay in 2003. Bordello owner Lance Gilman purchased the buildings for $145,100 and moved them to his Wild Horse Adult Resort & Spa five miles (8 km) to the east, where the relocated and extensively renovated buildings eventually became the second brothel located at that complex. However, the rights to the name Mustang Ranch, which Gilman had hoped to use for this new brothel, were tied up in a court battle with David Burgess, the owner of the Old Bridge Ranch, nephew of Joe Conforte, and manager of the Mustang Ranch from 1979 until 1989. In December 2006, a federal judge ruled that Gilman was the "exclusive owner of the Mustang Ranch trademark" giving him the rights to use the name and branding.

In late March 2007, the final remaining building, the Annex II which had been bought for $8,600 by Dennis Hof, was burned down in a fire department training exercise. A Reno Gazette-Journal report cited plans for the restoration of natural conditions to the section of the Truckee River flowing through the land, following the completion of a similar restoration five miles downstream on McCarran Ranch land owned by The Nature Conservancy.

Contrary to a popular urban legend circulated by email, the Mustang Ranch was never operated by the U.S. government. It was operated by the Bankruptcy Trustee appointed by the United States Bankruptcy Court on behalf of the United States Government.

== In media ==
The 1973 motion picture Charley Varrick contained a scene filmed at Mustang Ranch, with a cameo by Joe Conforte. Nevada writer Gabriel R. Vogliotti (1908–1983) did research living at the Mustang Ranch. In 1975, he authored The Girls of Nevada, with a subtitle on the dust jacket, Featuring Joe Conforte, Overseer of the Mustang Ranch. In 1978, Robert Goralnick wrote and directed Mustang: The House That Joe Built.

The 2010 film Love Ranch starring Helen Mirren is loosely based on the events at the Mustang Ranch. After a visit to the new Mustang Ranch in 2008, Mirren announced she was a "complete believer in legal brothels".

The brothel was the subject of the 2003 BBC TV documentary film Louis and the Brothel.

The first episode of the second series of Stacey Dooley Sleeps Over USA, titled "The Brothel", was set in the Mustang Ranch. It was first broadcast in March 2024.

== See also ==
- Prostitution in Nevada
- List of brothels in Nevada
