= Project Shoal =

Coordinates: 39.200°N 118.381°W

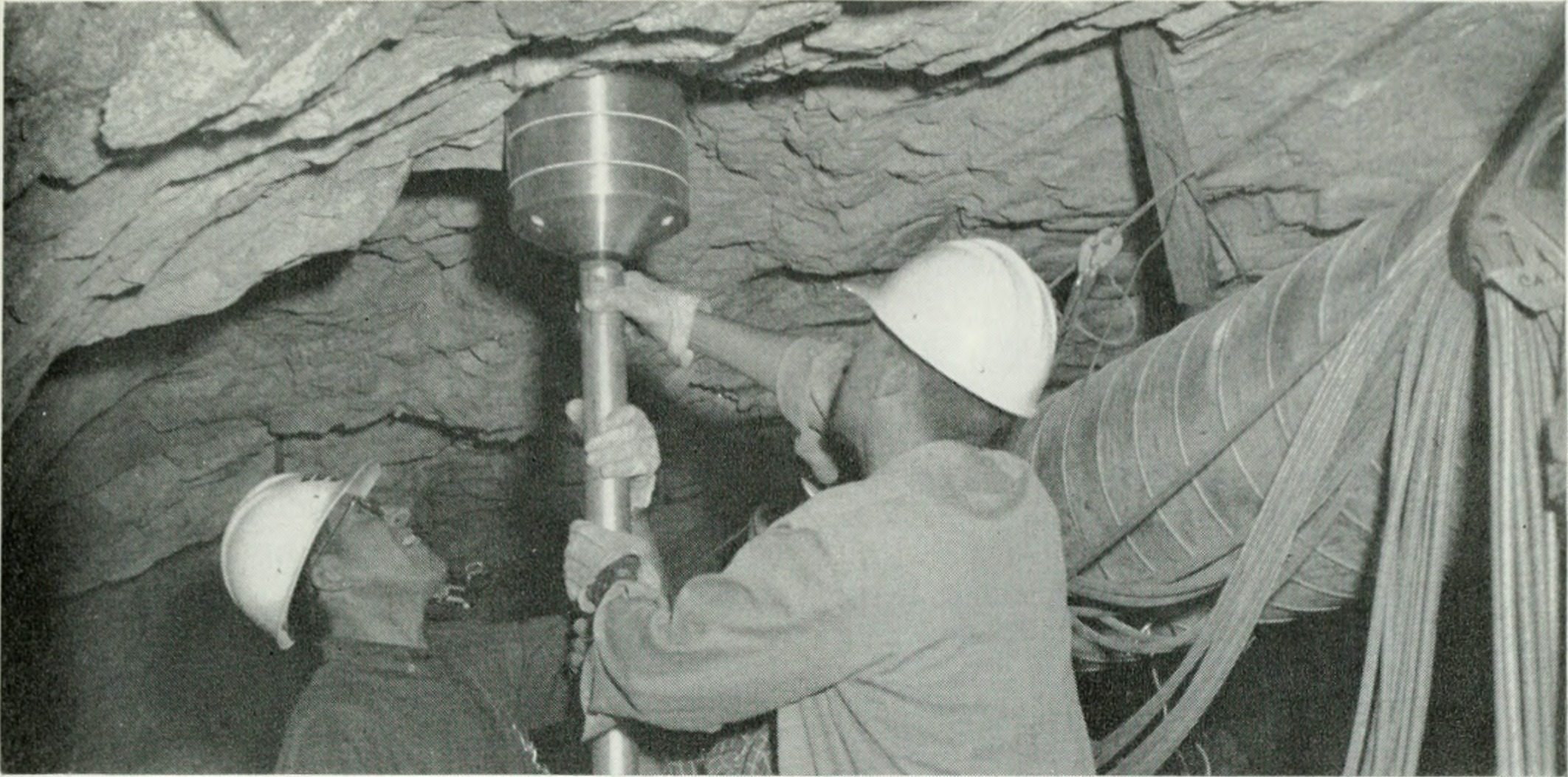
- Installing a hydrodynamic gauge to measure the nuclear test

Information
- Country: United States
- Test series: Operation Niblick; Vela Uniform
- Test site: Sand Springs Range
- Date: October 26, 1963
- Test type: Underground
- Yield: 12 kt

Project Shoal was an underground nuclear test that took place on October 26, 1963 within the Sand Springs Range, approximately 30 miles (48 km) southeast of Fallon, Nevada, in a granite formation of the range. The site was selected because its earthquake activity afforded a basis for seismic signal comparisons.

Project Shoal was part of the Vela Uniform program sponsored jointly by the U.S. Department of Defense and the U.S. Atomic Energy Commission. Vela Uniform was directed toward locating, detecting, and identifying underground detonations. The objective of Project Shoal was to detonate a nuclear device underground in an active seismic area so that seismic traces for the test and prior earthquakes could be compared and differentiated.

Cross section of the Shoal Site area

The test was performed on October 26, 1963. It involved detonating a 12-kiloton nuclear device in granitic rock at a depth of approximately 1,211 feet (369 m) below ground surface.

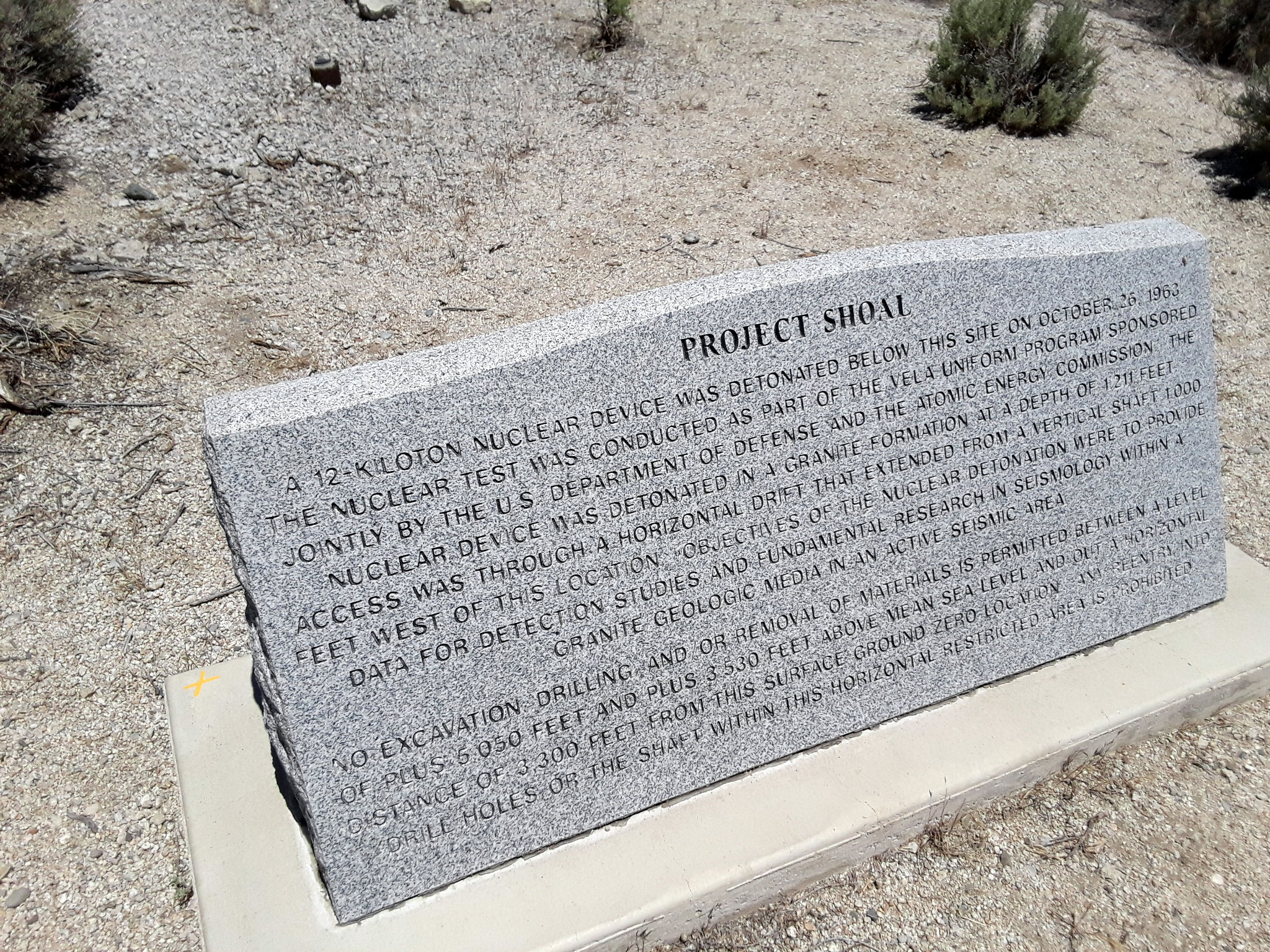
Marker atop Project Shoal site in Nevada
