= Wild Horse Adult Resort & Spa =

Adult entertainment complex in Sparks, Nevada

- Location in Nevada
- Address: 1000 Wild Horse Canyon Drive
- Location: Sparks, Nevada 89434
- Coordinates: 39°32′38″N 119°33′18″W
- Owner: Lance Gilman

Construction
- Opened: 2002

Website
- www.thewildhorse.com

The Wild Horse Adult Resort and Spa is an adult entertainment complex about 14 miles (23 km) east of Reno, Nevada, that has been home to two separate legal, licensed brothels: the Wild Horse Ranch and the Mustang Ranch. It opened in 2002 with the Wild Horse Ranch, the Mustang Ranch was added in 2005, and the Wild Horse Ranch closed in 2011. The brothel was the subject of the 2003 BBC TV documentary film Louis and the Brothel.

== Location ==
The property is located in a secluded portion of the Patrick Business Park, in the far northern portion of Storey County, at 1000 Wild Horse Canyon Drive, Sparks, NV 89434. Primary access to the area is via exit 28 off Interstate 80. The nearby settlement of Patrick, from which the Business Park takes its name (and occupants their mailing addresses), is actually found across the Truckee River and thus is located in Washoe County.

== History ==
- Reno-area developer and businessman Lance Gilman was given approval for a new brothel license by Storey County officials. The facility would be built in a box canyon at the southwest end of the Patrick Business Park off exit 28 of Interstate 80. However, a couple of existing tenants of the park objected, and several legal battles ensued. Eventually, these disputes were resolved in favor of Gilman.
- On June 7, 2002, the Wild Horse Canyon Ranch opened for business in an eight-room temporary facility located on the property that would eventually become known as the Wild Horse Adult Resort & Spa.
- In May 2003 the newly built main house of the renamed Wild Horse Ranch opened for business. The former temporary facility was then renovated and became the Manager's Residence. The current gated entrance to the entire property also opened at this time.
- During 2004, the buildings of the nearby former Mustang Ranch were put up for auction by the U.S. Bureau of Land Management, which had acquired their properties after they were seized by the Federal Government in 1999. Gilman outbid all others for the famous pink stucco Mustang I brothel buildings. That autumn, he moved those buildings to his Wild Horse Adult Resort & Spa property.
- On November 30, 2004, Gilman was granted a second brothel license by Storey County.
- After extensive renovations, Lance Gilman's World Famous Brothel opened for business on July 1, 2005. Susan Austin, general manager of the Wild Horse, spent a great deal of time, money, and effort to recreate the lavish atmosphere of the old Mustang parlor. Reportedly, she was even able to somehow contact fugitive former Mustang Ranch owner Joe Conforte, who many years earlier had fled to Brazil to avoid prosecution on tax charges, for his input on the renovations. The resulting facility incorporates many more modern design and operational features while still retaining the lavish decor of the Mustang's heyday. Due to a continuing court battle with David Burgess, owner of the Old Bridge Ranch and nephew of Conforte, the rights to use the Mustang Ranch name was still in legal limbo. This "old bordello at a new site" was simply called the 'World Famous Brothel', a name that resulted from the covering up of the 'Mustang Ranch' portion of the original sign (which came with the building). In December 2006, a federal judge ruled that Gilman was the "exclusive owner of the Mustang Ranch trademark" giving him the rights to use the name and branding.
- On November 15, 2011, The Wild Horse Ranch lost its brothel license and was forced to shut down. The license was revoked due to Gilman illegally having a silent partner, Tom Gonzales, from whom he borrowed $2.25 million for 5% ownership. In 2013, Gonzales successfully sued Gilman's company for $1.3M loss of profits due to the closure of brothel. The site was immediately rebranded as the Mustang Adult Resort & Spa.
- In 2012, the reality series Mustang Ranch: Labor of Love documented life at the brothel.
