= Call Me: The Rise and Fall of Heidi Fleiss =

2004 television film

- Based on: Life of Heidi Fleiss
- Written by: Norman Snider
- Directed by: Charles McDougall
- Starring: Jamie-Lynn Sigler; Brenda Fricker; Emmanuelle Vaugier; Natassia Malthe
- Theme music composer: Ryan Shore
- Country of origin: United States
- Original language: English

Production
- Producers: Chad Oakes; Damian Ganczewski
- Cinematography: David Franco
- Editors: Bridget Durnford; Jim Gross
- Running time: 84 minutes
- Production company: Nomadic Pictures

Original release
- Network: USA Network
- Release: March 29, 2004

Call Me: The Rise and Fall of Heidi Fleiss is a television film starring Jamie-Lynn Sigler as Hollywood madame Heidi Fleiss. It aired on USA Network on March 29, 2004.

== Plot ==
Heidi Fleiss (Jamie-Lynn Sigler), the daughter of a prominent Los Angeles doctor, becomes a prostitute for well-known Los Angeles Madam Alex (Brenda Fricker). She soon takes over her boss' operation and begins raking in $300,000 a month by hiring only the most beautiful and high-class prostitutes and catering to wealthy Hollywood types, Europeans, Arab sheiks, and American corporate executives. Her operation is broken up by Los Angeles police in 1993 and she is eventually sent to prison for income tax evasion.

== Cast ==
- Jamie-Lynn Sigler as Heidi Fleiss
- Brenda Fricker as Madame Alex
- Saul Rubinek as Paul Fleiss
- Emmanuelle Vaugier as Lauren
- Natassia Malthe as Charisse
- Ian Tracey as Sergeant Willeford
- Blu Mankuma as Police chief
- Robert Davi as Ivan Nagy
- Corbin Bernsen as Steve
- Hrant Alianak as Prince Hassan
- Crystal Balint as Tracey
- Susannah Hoffmann as Elissa Fleiss
- Missy Peregrym as Tina
- Joe Norman Shaw as Heidi's Lawyer
- Stefanie von Pfetten as Michelle

== Production ==
The original title for the movie was Going Down: The Rise and Fall of Heidi Fleiss. Filmed on location in Calgary, Alberta, Canada, many scenes were filmed at Calgary's "Bow River Correctional Centre", a minimum security institution which had been closed and empty for some time before filming and has since been renovated and re-opened as the Southern Alberta Forensic Psychiatric Centre.

== Home media ==
The film was released on Region 1 DVD on May 17, 2005, by 20th Century Fox. It is formatted for closed-caption and subtitled widescreen.

== Music ==
The film's original score was composed by Ryan Shore.
