= Chase Hoyt =

American actor

- Born: Chase Henry Hoyt; August 29, 1980 (age 46); Tucson, Arizona, United States
- Occupation: Actor

Chase Henry Hoyt (born August 29, 1980) is an American film, television, and stage actor.

== Biography ==
Hoyt was born in Tucson, Arizona, to Karen Carol McGurren and Robert Quentin Hoyt. Hoyt attended boarding school at Lawrence Academy in Groton, Massachusetts. In his senior year, because it was mandatory to graduate, Hoyt took his first theater class. After graduating, he returned home, where he attended the University of Arizona, majoring in business.

In 2001, Hoyt left college to study theater at the Royal Academy of Dramatic Art in London, England. He was mentored by Greg de Polnay, and appeared in two Shakespearean plays, King John, and All's Well that Ends Well. After his training, He moved to Los Angeles and studied under coach Stephen Book.

Hoyt first worked as an extra on the TV shows American Dreams and Eve. He also co-starred on the TV shows Star Trek: Enterprise and Numb3rs. While auditioning for a Hallmark movie, he was asked to read for another part, and found himself playing the son of James Gammon in the Hallmark made-for-TV movie What I did For Love. Hoyt was in the independent film Alien 51, opposite Heidi Fleiss.

Hoyt has also appeared in numerous short and feature films, including "Out of the Shadows," "Afterlife," and "The Yellow Butterfly," which has won domestic and international awards. Aside from theatrical work, In 2005, Hoyt appeared on the show Fear Factor, where he and his teammate won the competition after eating over one hundred live African stink beetles and leeches, and crashing two Camaros on a Los Angeles race track.

== Filmography ==
- Thule (2010) - Lt. Grady, Co-producer
- What I Did for Love (2006) - Zeb Ryder
- Fear Factor (2005) - Contestant/Himself
- Dr. Chopper (2005) - Reese
- Numb3rs (2005) - Paparazzi #1
- Star Trek: Enterprise (2005) - Starfleet Lieutenant
- Legion of the Dead (2005) - Justin
- The Aviator(2004) - Usher
- Alien 51 (2004) - Doctor Psychobilly
- Eve (2003) - Lounge Drunk
- American Dreams (2003) - Lacrosse Captain
- American Tragedy (2000) - Attorney
- The Translator (2000) - Dock Boy
