= Wiki Wiki =

Wiki Wiki may refer to:

- Wiki wiki dollar, a giveaway promotion from the Chevron gasoline company during the 1960–1970s
- Wiki Wiki Shuttle, a bus service at Daniel K. Inouye International Airport in Honolulu, Hawaii
- WikiWikiWeb, the first wiki, or user-editable website
- "wikiwiki" a Hawaiian word meaning "quick"

== See also ==
- Wiki (disambiguation)
  - Wiki, a form of hypertext publication on the internet
