= Wikipedia (disambiguation) =

Wikipedia is a free, collaborative and multilingual Internet encyclopedia.

Wikipedia may also refer to:

- English Wikipedia, Wikipedia's first and largest edition
- 274301 Wikipedia, an asteroid
- "Wikipedia", a single by American singer Jean Deaux
- "Wikipedia", a single by Swedish rapper Jireel

== See also ==
- List of Wikipedias
- Wiki (disambiguation)
