= Heidi Fleiss: Hollywood Madam =

1996 film by Nick Broomfield

Hollywood Madam
- Directed by: Nick Broomfield
- Produced by: Nick Broomfield
- Cinematography: Paul Kloss
- Edited by: Susan J. Bloom
- Music by: David Bergeaud
- Distributed by: InPictures
- Release dates: December 27, 1995 (US); February 9, 1996 (UK)
- Running time: 107 minutes
- Countries: United States; UK; Canada; Germany
- Language: English

Heidi Fleiss: Hollywood Madam (1996) is a feature-length documentary film by Nick Broomfield. It concerns Heidi Fleiss, then a madam involved in a prostitution ring.

The film documents the power struggle among Fleiss, her former mentor Elizabeth Adams (known as Madam Alex), and Fleiss' former lover Iván Nagy, himself allegedly involved in prostitution. The film also chronicles the destructive relationship between Fleiss and Nagy, a sort of mutual aggressiveness that both seem to find appealing. The documentary was co-funded by the BBC, HBO, CBC and WDR.

== Summary ==
The documentary begins with news footage from Fleiss' arrest in mid-1993 and her alleged connections to some of the most powerful men in Hollywood, including top executives at Columbia Pictures and her little black book which listed all of her clients. Broomfield arrives in Los Angeles one year later and is close to securing a meeting with Heidi before she is arrested again, this time on income tax evasion charges. Keen to learn more about why someone from Fleiss' privileged background (including a father who was a renowned pediatrician and a school teacher mother) entered the world of prostitution, Broomfield goes to her now-abandoned $1.5 million house in Beverly Hills and looks at the pool area where Heidi entertained some of her clients.

Broomfield then tries to find out more about Fleiss by visiting her old hangouts (The Roxbury, Tattoo and The Monkey Bar in Pasadena) as well as trying to get information from some sex workers, none of whom are either willing or able to give much information. At a motel, Broomfield meets adult entertainment superstar and now director Ron Jeremy who has just finished filming Bobbit Uncut. Jeremy puts Broomfield in touch with "professional Heidi girl" Gabby who is making a living doing interviews about Fleiss, who in turn puts him in touch with another one of Heidi's former employees- Heather. Heather recounts that Fleiss' clients would often pay the girls to sit around and watch them take drugs. Heather helps Broomfield to meet Fleiss' former teenage friend and confidante Victoria Sellers, then recently released from jail on a narcotics charge and residing in a small house off Melrose. Sellers explains that Fleiss' started to change as she became more involved in the prostitution business- "she could be so sweet and giving but overnight became a mean, ice-cold bitch".

The main part of the documentary examines the relationship between Fleiss and both her mentors into the pandering business- former 'super Madam' Madam Alex (born Elizabeth Adams) and film director (and later lover) Ivan Nagy. Madam Alex, then in failing health and living in a small house in West Los Angeles recounts how Nagy sold Fleiss to her for £450.00 dollars but that her protege "had a way with men" and was able to charm them into bypassing Madam Alex completely. Madam Alex theorizes that Fleiss erred by being flamboyant, not discrete enough with her business and annoyed her rivals by being so open; Madam Alex also suggests that Ivan Nagy set Heidi up to be arrested as she "got greedy" and wouldn't give him a big enough cut in the business. Police detective Jim Wakefield confirms Madam Alex's suspicions that Nagy was "100% pulling the strings"; Broomfield suspects that Fleiss' arrest and harsher prosecution by the state was due to the fact she was a bad police informant.

Broomfield later meets with Ivan Nagy, who explains that Madam Alex is one of the most horrible people he has ever met and that she is responsible for shopping Heidi to the police after Fleiss stole her business. Broomfield attempts to find and interview Jakob 'Cookie' Orgad, a former Israeli soldier who tapped Madam Alex's phone lines to help Fleiss and Nagy steal the business. Other former sex workers testify that Nagy and Cookie were both physically abusive towards them, backing up Madam Alex's claim that they were both feared due to this.

The film ends with footage from two interviews that Broomfield conducted with Fleiss- one at her clothing store shortly after her arrest (and release) and the other at home prior to her sentencing. Broomfield challenges Fleiss over claims she is no longer in love with Ivan Nagy after he shows her evidence of her car going to his apartment complex late at night. The film ends with Broomfield uncertain about the real truth behind Fleiss' relationship with her mentors and her future.

== Box office ==
Although it received positive reviews, (Roger Ebert called it one of the ten best films of the year), the film did not gain a large box-office return in its theatrical release. Opening at two North American theatres on February 9, 1996, it grossed $14,321 ($7,160 per screen) in its opening weekend, on its way to a final gross of just $34,402.
