= Andrzej Bartkowiak =

Polish cinematographer and film director (b. 1950)

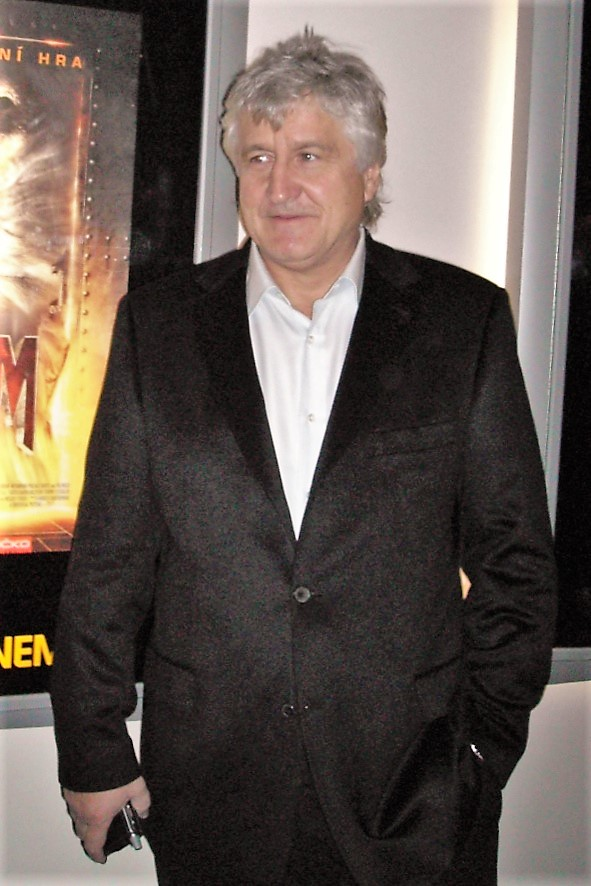
- Bartkowiak at the premiere of Doom, 2005
- Born: March 6, 1950 (age 76); Łódź, Poland
- Education: Łódź Film School
- Occupations: Cinematographer, film director
- Years active: 1973–present
- Spouse: Diane Venora (m. 1980; div. 1989)
- Children: 3

Andrzej Bartkowiak, ASC (born 6 March 1950) is a Polish cinematographer and film director, long based in the United States.

He became known for his partnership with director Sidney Lumet, shooting 11 of his films in the 1980s. From the 2000s onwards, he transitioned into a directing career, mainly with action films.

== Early life and education ==
Bartkowiak was born and raised in Łódź. As a teenager, he played in a rock band and wrote for his school newspaper. Though he originally intended to become a painter, he developed an interest in filmmaking and enrolled in the Łódź Film School in 1970. He has cited the influence of painters, particularly Caravaggio and Goya, in his cinematography.

After two years of study, he left his studies, and moved to the United States and settled in New York City, where he lived for a time with Polish actress Elżbieta Czyżewska and David Halberstam.

== Career ==
Barkowiak worked as a cinematographer and director on dozens of television commercials and industrial films, for clients like IBM, Xerox, American Express, Pepsi, Coca-Cola, and Toyota. He also worked for several years in Italy.

=== Cinematography ===
Bartkowiak shot his first feature, the independent feature Deadly Hero, in 1975. Though the film was neither a critical nor commercial success, he later recalled "it gave me confidence — and it gave other people confidence in me."

He achieved prominence in the early 1980s through a close association with director Sidney Lumet, shooting 11 of his films between 1981 and 1993.. Lumet approached Bartkowiak after being impressed by his day-for-night photography on the made-for-TV film The Five Forty-Eight.

Bartkowiak is a member of the American Society of Cinematographers and received the Society's Lifetime Achievement Award in 2025.

=== Directing ===
Bartkowiak later became known as a director of action films, making his debut with Romeo Must Die (2000). He then directed Exit Wounds (2001) and Cradle 2 the Grave (2003), as well as the video game adaptations Doom (2005) and Street Fighter: The Legend of Chun-Li (2009).

== Personal life ==
Bartkowiak was married to actress Diane Venora between 1980 and 1989. They have one daughter, Madzia. He also has a daughter named Ania and a son named Marco.

In addition, Bartkowiak was friends with actor Bruce Willis during the 1980s. Willis credited Bartkowiak with securing his earliest extra acting work in The Verdict.

== Filmography ==
=== Director ===
==== Film ====
Year	Title
2000	Romeo Must Die
2001	Exit Wounds
2003	Cradle 2 the Grave
2005	Doom
2009	Street Fighter: The Legend of Chun-Li
2017	Maximum Impact
2020	Dead Reckoning

==== Music video ====
- "Excuse Me" - Shy Talk (1985)

=== Cinematographer ===
==== Film ====
Year	Title	Director	Notes
1975	Deadly Hero	Iván Nagy	
1981	Prince of the City	Sidney Lumet	1st of 11 collaborations with Lumet
1982	Deathtrap	Sidney Lumet	
1982	The Verdict	Sidney Lumet	
1983	Daniel	Sidney Lumet	
1983	Terms of Endearment	James L. Brooks	
1984	Garbo Talks	Sidney Lumet	
1985	Prizzi's Honor	John Huston	
1986	Power	Sidney Lumet	
1986	The Morning After	Sidney Lumet	
1987	Nuts	Martin Ritt	
1988	Twins	Ivan Reitman	
1989	Family Business	Sidney Lumet	
1990	Q&A	Sidney Lumet	
1991	Hard Promises	Martin Davidson	
1991	Off and Running	Ed Bianchi	
1992	A Stranger Among Us	Sidney Lumet	
1993	Falling Down	Joel Schumacher	
1993	Guilty as Sin	Sidney Lumet	
1994	Speed	Jan de Bont	
1994	A Good Man in Africa	Bruce Beresford	
1995	Losing Isaiah	Stephen Gyllenhaal	
1995	Species	Roger Donaldson	1st of 3 collaborations with Donaldson
1995	Jade	William Friedkin	
1996	The Mirror Has Two Faces	Barbra Streisand	with Dante Spinotti
1997	Dante's Peak	Roger Donaldson	
1997	The Devil's Advocate	Taylor Hackford	
1998	U.S. Marshals	Stuart Baird	
1998	Lethal Weapon 4	Richard Donner	
2000	Gossip	Davis Guggenheim	
2000	Thirteen Days	Roger Donaldson	
2011	Trespass	Joel Schumacher	
2017	Grey Lady	John Shea	
2020	A Zebra-Riding Boy	Chen Juzhi; Fan Xiaotian	

==== Short film ====
- Turkey. Cake. (1999)
- Laughing at Fat People (2022, documentary)

==== Television ====
- The 5:48 (1979, TV movie)

== Awards and nominations ==
Institution	Year	Category	Work	Result
Camerimage Festival	1993	Golden Frog	Falling Down	Nominated
Camerimage Festival	2006	Special Award (Note: Polish Cinematographer for Immense Contribution to the Art of Film)		Won
Los Angeles Film Critics Association	1982	Best Cinematography	The Verdict	Nominated
Polish Film Festival in America	2011	Wings Award		Won
