= Frank Sinatra bibliography =

List of books about Frank Sinatra

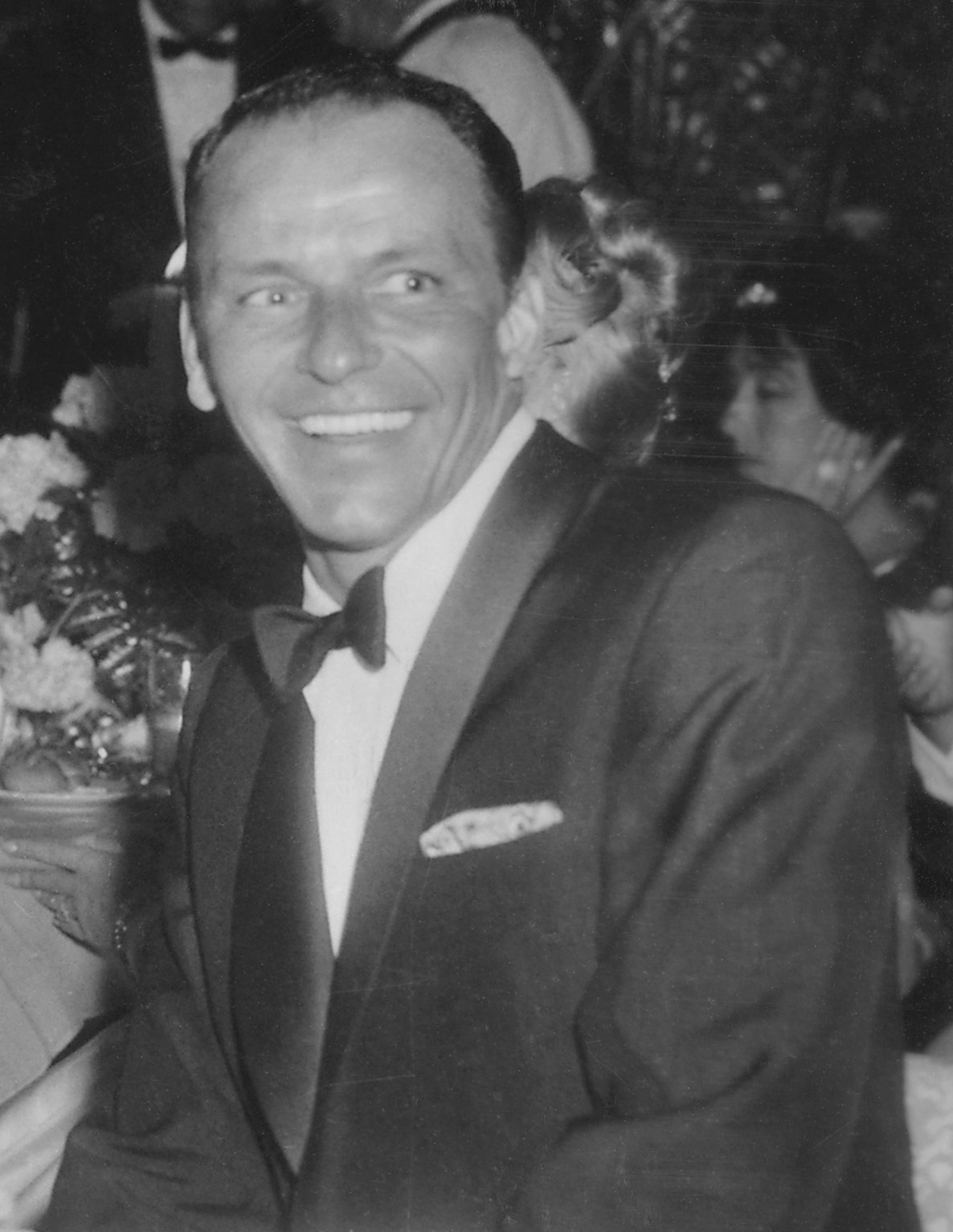
Sinatra in 1960

This is a list of books about Frank Sinatra.

== Biographies ==
- De Stefano, Gildo, The Voice – Vita e italianità di Frank Sinatra, Coniglio Press, Roma 2011 ISBN 978-88-6063-259-3
- Freedland, Michael (2000) All the Way: A Biography of Frank Sinatra. St Martins Press. ISBN 0-7528-1662-4
- Grudens, Richard (2010) Sinatra Singing. Celebrity Profiles Publishing. ISBN 978-0-9763877-8-7
- Havers, Richard (2004) Sinatra. Dorling Kindersley. ISBN 1-4053-1461-3
- Irwin, Lew (1997). Sinatra: A Life Remembered. Courage Books. ISBN 978-0-7624-0397-4.
- Kaplan, James (2010) Frank: The Voice. Doubleday. ISBN 978-0-385-51804-8
- Kaplan, James (2015) Sinatra: The Chairman. Doubleday. ISBN 978-0-385-53539-7
- Kelley, Kitty (1986) His Way: The Unauthorized Biography of Frank Sinatra. Bantam Press. ISBN 0-553-26515-6
- Lahr, John (1987) Sinatra. Random House. ISBN 0-7538-0842-0
- Munn, Michael (2002) Sinatra: The Untold Story. Robson Books Ltd. ISBN 1-86105-537-4
- Rockwell, John (1984) Sinatra: An American Classic. Rolling Stone. ISBN 0-394-53977-X
- Rojek, Chris (2004) Frank Sinatra. Polity. ISBN 0-7456-3090-1
- Santopietro, Tom (2008) Sinatra In Hollywood. Thomas Dunne Books. ISBN 978-0-312-36226-3
- Summers, Antony and Swan, Robbyn (2005) Sinatra: The Life. Doubleday. ISBN 0-552-15331-1
- Taraborrelli, J. Randall (1998) Sinatra: The Man Behind the Myth. Mainstream Publishing. ISBN 1-84018-119-2
- Wilson, Earl (1976) Sinatra.

== Memoirs ==
- Ash, Vic. (2006) I Blew it My Way: Bebop, Big Bands and Sinatra. Northway Publications. ISBN 0-9550908-2-2
- Jacobs, George and Stadiem, William. (2003) Mr. S.: The Last Word on Frank Sinatra. HarperCollins. ISBN 0-330-41229-9
- Falcone, Vincent (2005). Frankly – Just Between Us: My Life Conducting Frank Sinatra's Music. Hal Leonard. ISBN 978-0-634-09498-9.

== Criticism ==
- Fuchs, J. & Prigozy, R., ed. (2007) Frank Sinatra: The Man, the Music, the Legend. The Boydell Press. ISBN 1-58046-251-0
- Granata, Charles L. (1999) Sessions with Sinatra: Frank Sinatra and the Art of Recording. Chicago Review Press. ISBN 978-1-55652-509-4
- Hamill, Pete (2003) Why Sinatra Matters. Back Bay Books. ISBN 0-316-73886-7
- Mustazza, Leonard, ed. (1998) Frank Sinatra and Popular Culture. Praeger. ISBN 0-275-96495-7
- Petkov, Steven and Mustazza, Leonard, ed. (1997) The Frank Sinatra Reader. Oxford University Press. ISBN 0-19-511389-6
- Pugliese, S., ed. (2004) Frank Sinatra: "History, Identity, and Italian American Culture ". Palgrave. ISBN 1-4039-6655-9
- Smith, Martin (2005) When Ol' Blue Eyes Was a Red. Redwords. ISBN 1-905192-02-9
- Zehme, Bill (1997) The Way You Wear Your Hat: Frank Sinatra and the Lost Art of Livin'. HarperCollins. ISBN 0-06-093175-2
- "Frank Sinatra – Through the Lens of Jazz", Jazz Times Magazine, May 1998
- Friedwald, Will (1999) Sinatra! The Song Is You: A Singer's Art. Da Capo Press. ISBN 0-684-19368-X
- Granata, Charles L. (1999) Sessions with Sinatra: Frank Sinatra and the Art of Recording. Chicago Review Press. ISBN 1-55652-509-5
- McNally, Karen (2008) When Frankie Went to Hollywood: Frank Sinatra and American Male Identity University of Illinois Press. ISBN 0-252-03334-5
- Pignone, Charles, with foreword by Sinatra, Frank Jr. and Jones, Quincy (2004) The Sinatra Treasures. Virgin Books. ISBN 1-85227-184-1
- Pignone, Charles, with foreword by Sinatra, Amanda (2007) Frank Sinatra: The Family Album Little Brown and Company. ISBN 0-316-00349-2
- Sinatra, Julie (2007) Under My Skin: My Father, Frank Sinatra The Man Behind the Mystique iuniverse.com, ISBN 0-595-43478-9
- Sinatra, Nancy (1986) Frank Sinatra, My Father. Doubleday. ISBN 978-0-385-23356-9
- Sinatra, Nancy (1998) Frank Sinatra 1915–1998: An American Legend. Reader's Digest. ISBN 0-7621-0134-2
- Sinatra, Tina (2000) My Father's Daughter. Simon & Schuster. ISBN 0-684-87076-2

== Cultural criticism ==
- Gigliotti, Gilbert L. A Storied Singer: Frank Sinatra as Literary Conceit. Greenwood Press, 2002.
- Hamill, Pete. Why Sinatra Matters. Back Bay Books, 2003.
- Mustazza, Leonard, ed. Frank Sinatra and Popular Culture. Praeger, 1998.
- Petkov, Steven and Mustazza, Leonard, ed. The Frank Sinatra Reader. Oxford University Press, 1997.
- Pugliese, S., ed. Frank Sinatra: "History, Identity, and Italian American Culture ". Palgrave, 2004.
- Smith, Martin. When Ol' Blue Eyes was a red. Redwords, 2005.
- Zehme, Bill. The Way You Wear Your Hat: Frank Sinatra and the Lost Art of Livin'. HarperCollins, 1997.

== Other ==
- Gigliotti, Gilbert L., ed. (2008) Sinatra: But Buddy I'm a Kind of Poem. Entasis Press ISBN 978-0-9800999-0-4
- Giordmaina, Diane [McCue] (2009) "Sinatra and The Moll". iUniverse. ISBN 978-0-595-53234-6
- Havers, Richard (2004) Sinatra. Dorling Kindersley. ISBN 1-4053-1461-3
- Ingham, Chris (2005) The Rough Guide to Frank Sinatra. Rough Guides. ISBN 1-84353-414-2
- Knight, Timothy (2010) Sinatra – Hollywood His Way. Running Press. ISBN 978-0-7624-3743-6
- Kuntz, Tom; Kuntz, Phil (2000) The Sinatra Files: The Secret FBI Dossier. Three Rivers Press ISBN 0-8129-3276-5
- Lloyd, David (2003) The Gospel According to Frank. New American Press. ISBN 1-930907-19-2
- O'Neill, Terry, ed. Morgan, Robert (2007) Sinatra: Frank and Friendly. Evans Mitchell Books. ISBN 1-901268-32-2
- Phasey, Chris (1995) Francis Albert Sinatra: Tracked Down (Discography). Buckland Publications. ISBN 0-7212-0935-1
- The New Rolling Stone Record Guide, Rolling Stone Press, 1983.
