= Irene Tsu =

American actress

- 諸慧荷
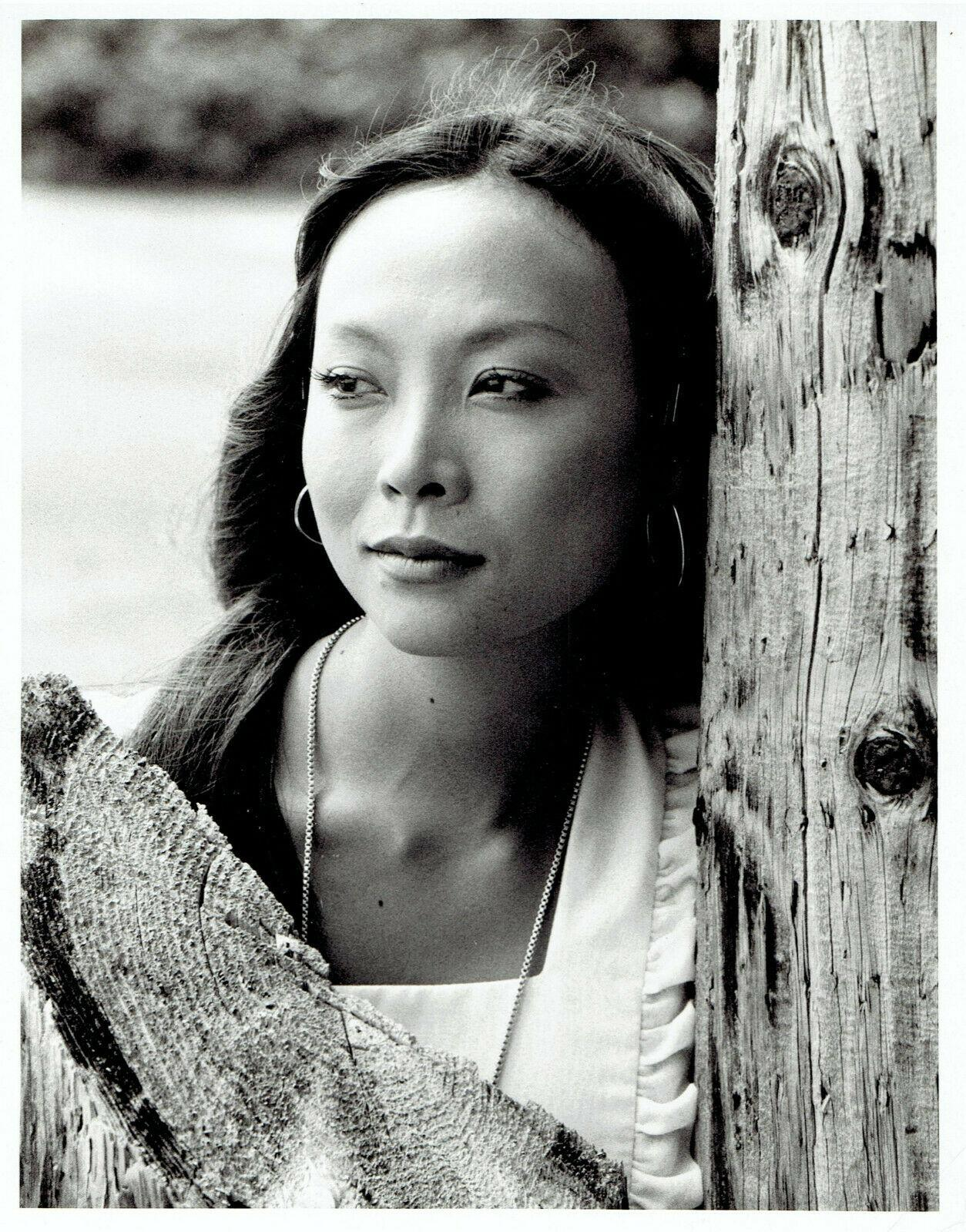
- Tsu c. 1973 in a publicity photo for Hawaii Five-O (1968–1980)
- Born: November 4, 1945 (age 81); Shanghai, China
- Education: UCLA
- Occupations: Actress; yoga instructor; real estate salesperson
- Years active: 1961–present
- Employer: Berkshire Hathaway HomeServices
- Organizations: Member of: Academy of Motion Picture Arts and Sciences; Screen Actors Guild (SAG); American Federation of Television and Radio Artists (AFTRA); California Association of Realtors (CAR); National Association of Realtors (NAR)
- Known for: Actress
- Height: 5 ft 4 in (1.63 m)
- Board member of: Beverly Hills Greater Los Angeles Association of Realtors (BHGLA)
- Spouse: Iván Nagy (m. 1971; div. 1980)
- Children: 1
- Awards: Voted woman of the year 1969 by US information Service

Chinese name
- Traditional Chinese: 諸慧荷
- Simplified Chinese: 诸慧荷
Transcriptions
Standard Mandarin
- Hanyu Pinyin: Zhū Huìhé
- Wade–Giles: Chu Hui-ho
- Website: irenetsu.com

Irene Tsu (born November 4, 1945) is a Shanghai-born American actress who has appeared in over thirty films, the first being 1961's Flower Drum Song. In the late 1960s, she starred in Chevron's popular "Wiki Wiki Dollar" advertising campaign. She speaks English and three varieties of Chinese.

== Early life and career ==
Tsu was born in Shanghai, China to Z.M. and Dulcie Lynn Tsu. Her father was a banker and her mother a painter. After political changes in China in the 1940s, the family left for Taiwan, then Hong Kong. Her father remained behind in Taiwan while in 1957 she and the rest of her immediate family (sister and mother) emigrated to Larchmont, New York, a suburb of New York City, where her aunt lived. Tsu attended Mamaroneck Elementary School in Mamaroneck, New York and studied ballet.

In the late 1950s, she auditioned for a dancing job in Broadway's Flower Drum Song. A staff member of the producer David Merrick's office saw the performance and auditioned her for the Broadway musical The World of Suzie Wong and Tsu got a part. Later Tsu auditioned for choreographer Hermes Pan in the upcoming film adaptation of the musical Flower Drum Song. The choreographer brought Irene to Hollywood and she was a teenage dancer in the film Flower Drum Song (1961), directed by Henry Koster. That same year, Tsu entered the Miss Chinatown USA beauty pageant on behalf of New York and won first place. Soon after, Tsu scored her first speaking role in another Hermes Pan film, Take Her, She's Mine (1963), starring James Stewart and Sandra Dee. Many film appearances followed, including a stint alongside Elvis Presley in his 1966 film Paradise, Hawaiian Style and roles in the hits Airport 1975 (1974) and Down and Out in Beverly Hills (1986).

She studied acting with Ned Maderino, Lee Strasberg and Peggy Feury and attended Los Angeles City College, UCLA Film School, and California State University, Los Angeles.

Tsu was active in television too. On November 21, 1963, the evening before President John F. Kennedy was assassinated, Tsu's only appearance on Perry Mason was aired on CBS, as she played the role of defendant Juli Eng in "The Case of the Floating Stones." She made guest appearances on many of the other popular '60s–70s television shows such as I Spy, The Man from U.N.C.L.E., Voyage to the Bottom of the Sea, Family Affair, Mission: Impossible, My Three Sons, Wonder Woman, and The Wild Wild West. In the 1960s, Tsu met Frank Sinatra in Miami, Florida where she was filming the "Chevron Island" commercials and Sinatra was filming Tony Rome. They dated for over two years.

Tsu married director Iván Nagy in 1971, although they later separated.

== Later career ==
From 1978 until 1989, Tsu was chief operating officer and head designer for her own leisure apparel company, The IT Company/Irene Tsu Designs.

Since 1990, Tsu has been a realtor for Coldwell Banker in Beverly Hills, California.

A long-time yoga practitioner, Tsu studied with yoga master Bikram Choudhury and is featured in both of his books Bikram's Beginning Yoga Class. She taught at Bikram Yoga College in Encinitas, California. She teaches weekly yoga classes at the Bikram HQ in Los Angeles and for the Beverly Hills Department of Parks.

She is a single mother to her daughter, an adopted niece from China.

== Selected filmography ==
=== Film ===
- Flower Drum Song (1961) as Dancer (uncredited)
- The Horizontal Lieutenant (1962) as Oriental Spy (uncredited)
- Under the Yum Yum Tree (1963) as Suzy (uncredited)
- Take Her, She's Mine (1963) as Miss Wu
- John Goldfarb, Please Come Home! (1965) as Harem Girl (uncredited)
- The Sword of Ali Baba (1965) as Nalu
- How to Stuff a Wild Bikini (1965) as Native Girl
- Seven Women (1966) as Chinese Girl
- Women of the Prehistoric Planet (1966) as Linda
- Paradise, Hawaiian Style (1966) as Pua
- Caprice (1967) as Su Ling
- Island of the Lost (1967) as Judy Hawllani
- The Green Berets (1968) as Lin
- The Yin and the Yang of Mr. Go (1970) as Tah-Ling
- Stand Up and Be Counted (1972) (uncredited)
- Three the Hard Way (1974) as Empress
- Airport 1975 (1974) as Carol
- Judge Dee and the Monastery Murders (1974, TV Movie) as Celestial Image
- Paper Tiger (1975) as Talah
- Deadly Hero (1975)
- Hot Potato (1976) as Detective Sgt. Pam Varaje
- Damien's Island (1976) as Momi
- Down and Out in Beverly Hills (1986) as Sheila Waltzberg
- Steele Justice (1987) as Xua Chan
- A Girl to Kill For (1990) as The Counselor
- Unbecoming Age (1992) as R.J.
- Mr. Jones (1993) as Mrs. Chang
- Snapdragon (1993) as Hua
- Comrades: Almost a Love Story (1996) as Aunt Rosie
- Golden Chicken (2002) as Kam's Aunt
- The Heart Specialist (2006) as Mrs. Olson
- Alibi (2007) as Chu Fan

=== Television ===
- Perry Mason TV series, episode: "The Case of the Floating Stones" (November 21, 1963) as Juli Eng
- My Favorite Martian TV series, Season 2 Episode 9 – "Double Trouble" (1964) as Leilani
- The Man from U.N.C.L.E. TV series, episode: "The Hong Kong Shilling Affair" (March 15, 1965) as Jasmine
- I Spy TV series, episode: "A Cup of Kindness" (September 22, 1965)
- Voyage to the Bottom of the Sea TV series, episode: "The Peacemaker" (November 21, 1965) as Su Yin
- My Three Sons, TV series, episode: "Robbie and the Slave Girl" (January 20, 1966) as Terry
- The Man from U.N.C.L.E., episode: "The Five Daughters Affair: Part II" (April 7, 1967) – Reikko
- The Wild Wild West TV series, episode: "The Night of the Samurai" (October 13, 1967) – Reiko O'Hara
- Family Affair TV series, episode: "Eastward Ho" (1970) – Ming Lee
- Cannon TV series, episode: "Bitter Legion" (1972)
- Mission: Impossible TV series, episode: "Double Dead" (February 12, 1972) as Penyo
- Hawaii Five-O TV series, episode: "Engaged to Be Buried" (February 27, 1973) as Alia
- Future Cop TV series (1977) as Doctor Tingley
- The Rockford Files, TV series, episode: "Irving the Explainer" (November 18, 1977) as Daphne Ishawaharda
- Wonder Woman, TV series, episode: "The Man Who Made Volcanoes" (November 18, 1977) as Mei Ling
- Trapper John, M.D., TV series, episode: "Heart and Seoul" (January 28, 1986) as Dr. Julie Lok
- Noble House (1988) all four episodes
- Tell Me No Secrets, (1997) TV movie
- Star Trek: Voyager, TV series, episode: "Author, Author" (April 18, 2001) as Mary Kim
- Cold Case, TV series, episode: "Chinatown" (November 22, 2009) as Da Chun Lu
- Law & Order: LA TV series, episode: "Angel's Knoll" (May 25, 2011) as Christina Yu
