= Walter A. Thompson =

American film editor (1903–1975)

- Born: May 8, 1903; Indiana, United States
- Died: December 17, 1975 (aged 72); Los Angeles, California, United States
- Occupation: Film editor

Walter A. Thompson (May 8, 1903 – December 17, 1975) was an American film editor with 69 film credits from 1930 to 1975. He was nominated twice for the Academy Award for Best Film Editing for This Above All (1942) and for The Nun's Story (1959). He was also nominated for an ACE Eddie Award for The Wonderful World of the Brothers Grimm (1962).

Thompson shared his last credit, Farewell, My Lovely (1975), with Joel Cox. It was Cox's first credit as an editor; he has gone on to a distinguished career working primarily with director Clint Eastwood.

== Selected filmography ==
Editor
Year	Film	Director	Notes
1930	Men Without Women	John Ford	First collaboration with John Ford
1932	Partners	Fred Allen	
1933	Under Secret Orders	Sam Newfield	
1934	Burn 'Em Up Barnes	Colbert Clark; Armand Schaefer	
1935	The Phantom Empire	Otto Brower; B. Reeves Eason	
1935	The New Adventures of Tarzan	Edward A. Kull; Wilbur McGaugh	
1936	Tundra	Norman Dawn	
1937	Wee Willie Winkie	John Ford	Second collaboration with John Ford
1937	Wife, Doctor and Nurse	Walter Lang	First collaboration with Walter Lang
1937	Second Honeymoon	Walter Lang	Second collaboration with Walter Lang
1938	Sally, Irene and Mary	William A. Seiter	
1938	Little Miss Broadway	Irving Cummings	First collaboration with Irving Cummings
1938	Just Around the Corner	Irving Cummings	Second collaboration with Irving Cummings
1939	Wife, Husband and Friend	Gregory Ratoff	
1939	The Story of Alexander Graham Bell	Irving Cummings	Third collaboration with Irving Cummings
1939	Young Mr. Lincoln	John Ford	Third collaboration with John Ford
1939	Hollywood Cavalcade	Irving Cummings	Fourth collaboration with Irving Cummings
1939	Everything Happens at Night	Irving Cummings	Fifth collaboration with Irving Cummings
1940	Lillian Russell	Irving Cummings	Sixth collaboration with Irving Cummings
1940	The Return of Frank James	Fritz Lang	
1940	Tin Pan Alley	Walter Lang	Third collaboration with Walter Lang
1941	That Night in Rio	Irving Cummings	Seventh collaboration with Irving Cummings
1941	Moon Over Miami	Walter Lang	Fourth collaboration with Walter Lang
1941	Wild Geese Calling	John Brahm	
1941	Swamp Water	Jean Renoir	
1942	Son of Fury: The Story of Benjamin Blake	John Cromwell	
1942	This Above All	Anatole Litvak	
1942	Thunder Birds	William A. Wellman	
1943	Crash Dive	Archie Mayo	
1943	Jane Eyre	Robert Stevenson	
1947	The Other Love	Andre de Toth	First collaboration with Andre de Toth
1947	The Gangster	Gordon Wiles	
1948	So This Is New York	Richard Fleischer	
1948	Pitfall	Andre de Toth	Second collaboration with Andre de Toth
1949	The Big Wheel	Edward Ludwig	
1950	Guilty of Treason	Felix E. Feist	
1950	Quicksand	Irving Pichel	
1950	The Second Woman	James V. Kern	
1959	The Nun's Story	Fred Zinnemann	First collaboration with Fred Zinnemann
1962	Samar	George Montgomery	
1962	The Wonderful World of the Brothers Grimm	Henry Levin; George Pal	First collaboration with Henry Levin
1964	Behold a Pale Horse	Fred Zinnemann	Third collaboration with Fred Zinnemann
1965	King Rat	Bryan Forbes	
1966	Walk, Don't Run	Charles Walters	
1966	Rage	Gilberto Gazcón	
1966	Murderers' Row	Henry Levin	Second collaboration with Henry Levin
1968	A Flea in Her Ear	Jacques Charon	
1969	Model Shop	Jacques Demy	
1969	Marooned	John Sturges	
1970	The Baby Maker	James Bridges	First collaboration with James Bridges
1971	Skin Game	Paul Bogart	
1971	The Todd Killings	Barry Shear	
1972	Fat City	John Huston	
1972	The Magnificent Seven Ride!	George McCowan	
1973	Shamus	Buzz Kulik	
1973	Bad Charleston Charlie	Iván Nagy	
1973	The Paper Chase	James Bridges	Second collaboration with James Bridges
1974	Mixed Company	Melville Shavelson	
1975	Rafferty and the Gold Dust Twins	Dick Richards	First collaboration with Dick Richards
1975	Farewell, My Lovely	Dick Richards	Second collaboration with Dick Richards

Editorial department
Year	Film	Director	Role
1948	Force of Evil	Abraham Polonsky	Editorial supervisor
1950	Guilty of Treason	Felix E. Feist	Supervising editor

Additional crew
Year	Film	Director	Role	Notes	Other notes
1951	Pickup	Hugo Haas	Technical supervisor		
1957	Sayonara	Joshua Logan	Production associate		
1960	The Sundowners	Fred Zinnemann	Production associate	Second collaboration with Fred Zinnemann	Uncredited

Producer
Year	Film	Director	Credit
1961	Romanoff and Juliet	Peter Ustinov	Associate producer

Documentaries

Additional crew
Year	Film	Director	Role
1952	This Is Cinerama	Mike Todd; Mike Todd Jr.; Himself; Fred Rickey	Prologue supervisor

Director
Year	Film	Notes
1956	Seven Wonders of the World	
1958	South Seas Adventure	Second segment

Shorts

Editor
Year	Film	Director
1931	Not So Loud	Harry Sweet
1931	All Gummed Up	Harry Sweet
1931	Lemon Meringue	Harry Sweet
1931	That's News to Me	Arvid E. Gillstrom
1931	Beach Pajamas	Roscoe Arbuckle
1931	Easy to Get	Howard Bretherton
1932	Only Men Wanted	Ralph Ceder
1932	Blondes by Proxy	Edgar Kennedy
1932	Niagara Falls	Roscoe Arbuckle

TV movies

Editor
Year	Film	Director
1973	The Man Who Could Talk to Kids	Donald Wrye

TV series

Editor
Year	Title	Notes
1951	Stars Over Hollywood	4 episodes
1952	Chevron Theatre	1 episode
1952	Hollywood Opening Night	2 episodes
1952	The Campbell Playhouse	1 episode
1952	Invitation Playhouse: Mind Over Murder	3 episodes
