= Heidi Fleiss =

American madam (born 1965)

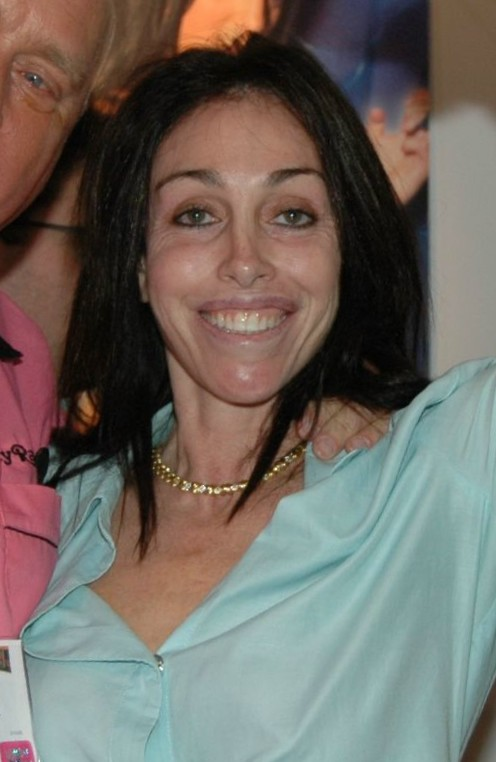
- Fleiss in 2006
- Born: Heidi Lynne Fleiss; December 30, 1965 (age 60); Los Angeles, California, U.S.
- Occupations: Madam; media personality; entrepreneur
- Known for: Heidi Fleiss: Hollywood Madam; Celebrity Rehab with Dr. Drew; Celebrity Big Brother
- Partner(s): Iván Nagy (1987–1995); Tom Sizemore (1999–2003); Dennis Hof (2009–2018; his death)
- Parent(s): Paul M. Fleiss; Elissa Ash

Heidi Lynne Fleiss (born December 30, 1965) is an American former madam, media personality, and entrepreneur. In the earlier 90s, Fleiss ran an upscale prostitution ring based in Los Angeles, and is often referred to as the "Hollywood Madam". Fleiss also formerly worked as a columnist and was a television personality regularly featured in the 1990s American media.

== Early life ==
Fleiss was born and raised in the Los Feliz neighborhood of Los Angeles, California, to a Jewish family. Her father, Paul M. Fleiss (1933–2014), was a pediatrician and her mother, Elissa Ash, was an elementary school teacher. Their marriage ended in divorce. She has two brothers: Jesse (born in 1977), and Jason (born in 1968), who drowned at age 41 in 2009; and three sisters: Amy, Kim, and Shana.

== Prostitution ring and prosecution ==
At the age of 22, Fleiss began managing a prostitution ring under Madam Alex after meeting her in 1987 via Fleiss's film director boyfriend Iván Nagy. Fleiss stated in 2002 that Alex and she had "a very intense relationship" and that Alex's view of Fleiss "was kind of like the daughter she loved and hated, so she was abusive and loving at the same time". In the same interview, Fleiss said she worked as a prostitute for a short period to learn all aspects of the trade. At the time she was learning to take over Alex's business, there was a labor shortage; most of Alex's prostitutes were approaching middle age, and planning to retire from prostitution. Alex had Fleiss revitalize the business by recruiting a new batch of young, attractive women.

By 1990, Fleiss severed her links with Madam Alex and began her own prostitution ring. Fleiss has stated that she made her first million dollars after only four months in the business as a madam, and that on her slowest night, she made $10,000. By 1991, Fleiss was so successful that she was able to reject women who wished to work for her. In July 1992, through her father, Paul, Fleiss purchased her Benedict Canyon home for $1.6 million which had previously been owned by Michael Douglas.

In June 1993, Fleiss was arrested in a sting operation on charges of attempted pandering after undercover officers posed as Japanese businessmen contacted Fleiss for her services, offering $1,500 per escort plus half an ounce of cocaine.

Federal charges were filed in 1994, and Fleiss posted $1 million bail; the state trial began the same year and Fleiss was convicted. In 1995, Hollywood actor Charlie Sheen testified against Fleiss, admitting to paying $53,000 for her services between 1991 and 1993.

In May 1996, her state conviction was overturned and her appeal bond was set at $200,000. She was convicted of federal charges of tax evasion in September 1996 and sentenced to 37 months in prison. Fleiss served 20 months at the Federal Correctional Institution, Dublin, California. She was released to a halfway house on November 19, 1998, and ordered to perform 370 hours of community service.

Fleiss's ring reportedly had numerous prominent and wealthy clients. When questioned by British television presenter Davina McCall about revealing the names of her clients, she replied "It's not my style".

== Media appearances ==
In 1995, Nick Broomfield made a documentary about her prostitution ring titled Heidi Fleiss: Hollywood Madam. In 1996, after having been convicted of being a madam, and shortly before her incarceration for such offenses, she was interviewed by Ruby Wax. Fleiss and model Victoria Sellers produced an instructional DVD titled Sex Tips with Heidi Fleiss and Victoria Sellers in 2001. In 2008, Fleiss was the subject of the HBO documentary, Heidi Fleiss: The Would-Be Madam of Crystal.

In 2009, Fleiss was treated for substance abuse at the Pasadena Recovery Center, which was filmed for the third season of Celebrity Rehab with Dr. Drew. One of her fellow patients was Tom Sizemore, against whom her prior restraining order had lapsed. Both Fleiss and Sizemore consented to appear together on the show before filming began, and their reunion, depicted in the third episode, was amicable, though Fleiss subsequently expressed mixed feelings about his presence there. During the filming of the program, Fleiss left the center, and she was involved in an accident with her SUV near her home in Nevada. She subsequently returned to rehab.

In January 2010, Fleiss became a housemate on the Channel 4 reality series Celebrity Big Brother for its seventh series. She became the second housemate to be evicted. She did not return for the finale. Fleiss would then appear on the VH1 Celebrity Rehab spin-off Sober House. In 2011, she appeared in the Animal Planet reality special, Heidi Fleiss: Prostitutes to Parrots, displaying her new career in bird carrying.

In 2025, Fleiss appeared in the Netflix documentary miniseries Aka Charlie Sheen.

== Business ventures ==
In July 1994, Fleiss opened her clothing store, Heidi Wear, in Old Town Pasadena, it later relocated to Third Street Promenade in Santa Monica. In late 2003, Fleiss opened up her second clothing store 'Hollywood Madam' on Hollywood Boulevard; it closed within several months.

In 2005, Fleiss announced plans to open a brothel in Pahrump, Nevada, named Heidi Fleiss's Stud Farm. In 2007, Fleiss opened a laundromat named Dirty Laundry in Pahrump as her plans for the brothel had been put on hold due to a "slight complication". In 2009, she said that she had abandoned her plans to open such a brothel because she did not want to "deal with all the nonsense in the sex business". Instead, she said she would focus on renewable energy, which she described as "perfect for Nevada" and "the wave of the future". She opened a fashion boutique in Los Angeles after being released from prison.

As of April 2025, and since at least January 2017, Fleiss owns and manages the Flying S Ranch Ultralight Flightpark, an ultralight private use airport in Pahrump, with FAA designation NV54.

== Personal life and other legal issues ==
In April 2001, Fleiss was sentenced to six months of house detention after failing to show up to mandatory drug tests and admitting to using methamphetamine and prescription pills.

Fleiss dated actor Tom Sizemore between 1999 and 2003. In 2003, Fleiss accused Sizemore of domestic violence. Sizemore was later convicted and sentenced to six months in jail and three years probation.

Fleiss eventually moved to Pahrump, Nevada, a small town near Death Valley while caring for 25 parrots. Drew Pinsky, who treated Fleiss for substance abuse, performed brain scans on her that showed significant frontal lobe dysfunction, which Pinsky surmised was behind her inability to empathize with people, and her propensity for doing so with birds.

After completing treatment for substance abuse, Fleiss briefly became engaged to Dennis Hof, owner of Nevada's Moonlite BunnyRanch.

Fleiss said in 1994 that she is a vegetarian.

In August 2013, Nevada police found nearly 400 marijuana plants growing at her home in Pahrump, Nevada, but did not arrest Fleiss and submitted their report to the district attorney's office.

In 2022, Fleiss announced that she would be moving to Missouri after someone shot one of her parrots with a pellet gun.

== Depictions in media ==
In 1993, Fleiss became the prototype for the character of Lauren Ethridge in Season 2 of Melrose Place (played by Kristian Alfonso).

In 1996, Fleiss was portrayed by Tricia Leigh Fisher in the television film The Making of a Hollywood Madam.

Fleiss was portrayed by Jamie-Lynn Sigler in the 2004 television film Call Me: The Rise and Fall of Heidi Fleiss.

In 2021, composer Billy Recce released his musical theater concept album "Little Black Book" about Fleiss' story, co-conceived by director Will Nunziata. In 2025, "Little Black Book" was produced at the Bowery Ballroom, starring Tony-Nominee Orfeh, directed by Kristin Hanggi.

In 2022, Fleiss was the subject of HeidiWorld, an iHeartRadio podcast produced, written and hosted by Molly Lambert.

Aubrey Plaza will portray Fleiss in the upcoming unauthorized independent film The Heidi Fleiss Story.

== Filmography ==
Year	Title	Role	Notes
1995	The Doom Generation	Liquor store clerk	film debut
1995	Carrie on Hollywood	Herself	Episode: "Chasing the Hollywood Dream"
1995	Heidi Fleiss: Hollywood Madam	Herself	BBC Documentary
1996	Ruby Wax Meets...	Herself	Episode: "Heidi Fleiss"
1998	American Justice	Herself	Episode: "The Heidi Fleiss Story"
1998; 2010	E! True Hollywood Story	Herself	Episodes: "Heidi Fleiss", "Charlie Sheen"
2002	Fame for 15	Herself	Episode: "Bad Girls: Heidi Fleiss/Mary Kay Letourneau"
2002	Where Are They Now?	Herself	Episode: "Notorious & Newsworthy"
2002	I Love the '80s	Herself	Episode: "1987"
2003	Test the Nation	Herself	Fox television special
2003	Pauly Shore Is Dead	Herself	
2004	Alien 51	Evelda	
2005	Penn & Teller: Bullshit!	Herself	Episode: "Circumcision"
2005	Blind Date	Herself	Episode: "Hall of Shame"
2008	Heidi Fleiss: The Would-Be Madam of Crystal	Herself	HBO documentary
2009	Porndogs: The Adventures of Sadie	Fluffy	Voice
2010	Celebrity Big Brother	Herself	Series 7 contestant; evicted second
2010	Big Brother's Little Brother	Herself	12 episodes
2010	Big Brother's Big Mouth	Herself	4 episodes
2010	Celebrity Rehab with Dr. Drew	Herself	Season 3 patient
2010	Sober House	Herself	Season 2 cast
2011	Heidi Fleiss: Prostitutes to Parrots	Herself	Animal Planet special; also producer
2012	Richard E. Grant's Hotel Secrets	Herself	Episode: "Scandal"
2013	Oprah: Where Are They Now?	Herself	Episode: "Heidi Fleiss, Bow Wow All Grown Up & a Tribute to Roger Ebert"
2021	I Was a Teenage Felon	Herself	Episode: "Hollywood Queenpin"
2025	Aka Charlie Sheen	Herself	Part One; Netflix docuseries

== Published works ==
- Pandering. Los Angeles: One Hour Entertainment. 2002. ISBN 9780972016407.
- The Player's Handbook: The Ultimate Guide on Dating and Relationships. Los Angeles: One Hour Entertainment. 2004. ISBN 9780972016414.
