= David J. Marchi =

American artist (born 1956)

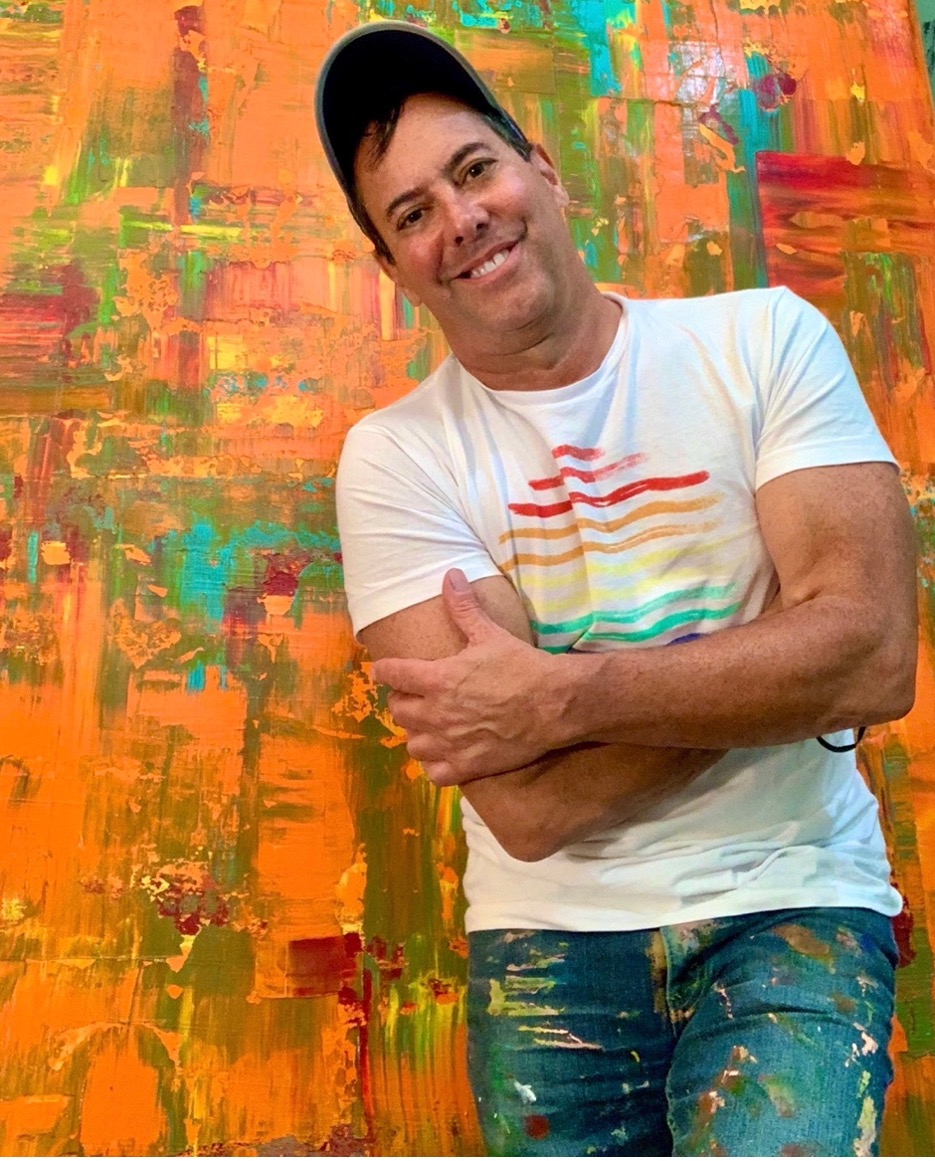
- Marchi at his art studio
- Born: David John Marchi; Wallingford, Connecticut, USA
- Education: Saint Michael's College (Political Science)
- Known for: Visual arts
- Style: Abstract impressionism
- Movement: Abstract art
- Spouse: Matthew Christopher (m. 2012)

David J. Marchi is an American visual artist whose work focuses on acrylic abstract art. He has expressed support for the use of creative practices such as painting, drawing, and music as tools for promoting mental and physical health.

== Career ==
Initially, Marchi worked for several companies including Grey Advertising and as director and president of Ryan Partnership, an advertising services company in Westport, Connecticut. He has also collaborated with Omnicom to develop Tracy Locke Partners, a marketing services company in New York City. He worked with brands like Heineken, PepsiCo, and Pizza Hut.

Marchi then went into painting after a boat accident in 2015. In 2018, he was diagnosed by Dr. Darold Treffert with acquired savant syndrome, where dormant savant skills emerge after a spinal or brain injury or disease in previously non-disabled persons.

Berts attic, 72 x 48 in.

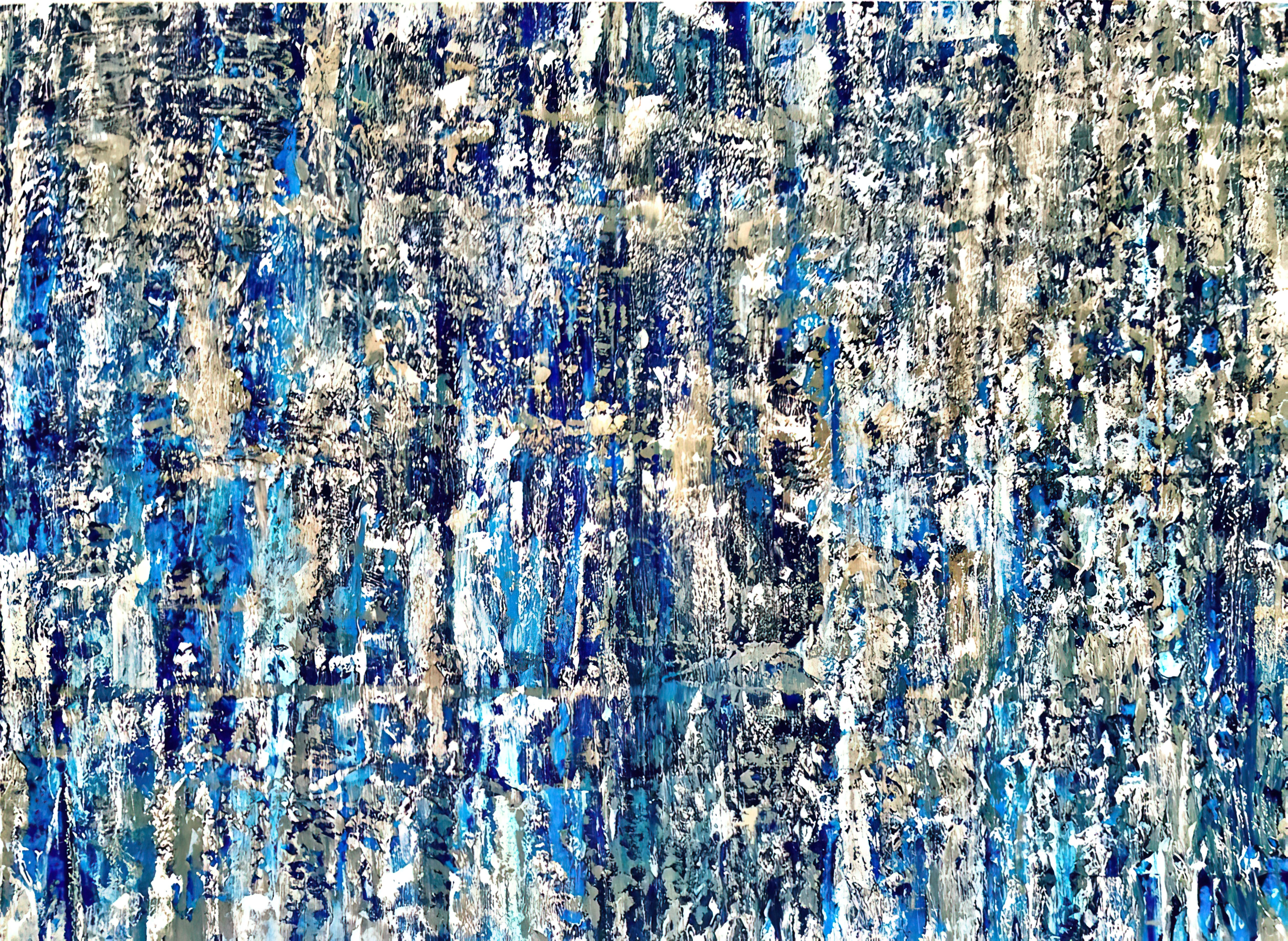
Aqua Vita

Art critic Jerry Saltz described his painting Aqua Vita, as having "Cezanne-like" veils of color and "no fear of scale."

In April 2022, Marchi also held a joint exhibition with Alder Crocker at the Carriage Barn Art Center.

As of 2023, Marchi was an artist member at the Art Students League of New York. As of 2021, he was also a member of the Silvermine Guild of Artists, in New Canaan, Connecticut.

== Personal life ==
Marchi married fashion designer Matthew Christopher Sobaski in December 2012.
