= Legion of the Dead (film) =

- DVD cover
- Directed by: Paul Bales
- Written by: Paul Bales
- Produced by: David Michael Latt; David Rimawi; Paul Bales
- Starring: Courtney Clonch; Claudia Lynx; Bruce Boxleitner; Zach Galligan; Chad Michael Collins
- Distributed by: The Asylum
- Release date: August 9, 2005
- Running time: 83 minutes
- Country: United States
- Language: English
- Budget: $500,000

Legion of the Dead is a 2005 American horror film produced by The Asylum. It stars Courtney Clonch and Bruce Boxleitner.

The film is a B movie based on Mummy legends, and was released in between two similar, more-successful films: The Mummy (1999) and The Mummy Returns (2001).

== Plot ==
Two young men speed through the California desert on dirt bikes when one of them crashes through a hole in the ground. They discover the entrance to an Egyptian tomb and are both killed in boobytraps when they break the tomb's seal. Some time later, the site is being uncovered by archeology students led by Dr. Ari Ben-David. Molly Kirnan, a grad student, arrives on the scene and meets Ben-David who's working with her professor Dr. Bryan Swatek among others as they start their excavation of the site. Inside the tomb they discover the sarcophagus of Aneh-Tet, a mythical priestess who worshiped Set and was banished “across the great water” for claiming to be a living god. In her burial chamber, the sarcophagus is surrounded by six other mummies with crystals in their chests.

Later that night, Molly returns to the site alone having had a translating epiphany while reading and inadvertently read Aneh-Tet back to life. Before the mummy reanimates however, a security officer finds Molly and turns her over to Dr. Swatek. When she refuses his advances she leaves the site. Aneh-Tet then rises and leaves the tomb, draining the life from Swatek and the security guard. Inside the tomb, two of the six mummies surrounding Aneh-Tet's sarcophagus have the crystals in their chest lit up. The next day, as the students arrive, and discover Swatek and the security guard's mummified bodies while Molly waits for her sister Kevyn to bring her a change of clothes at her motel. When Kevyn arrives, they encounter a nude Aneh-Tet and Molly is able to communicate with her, bringing her back to the dig site with her.

At the tomb, Aneh-Tet is recognized by Ben-David who pledges his servitude to her if she spares his life and she claims a third victim (a police deputy). Molly has to go take care of Kevyn at the motel because she is partying with several of the other students from the dog. While she does this, Aneh-Tet kills two more victims (Axel and another) lighting up five of the six mummies in her tomb. She tries to attack Carter but he is able to escape to the motel with Molly. Instead, Aneh-Tet kills Justin while Ben-David kills Kara will a pickaxe for seeing too much. Together, Aneh-Tet and Ben-David resurrect her legion of six mummies and commands them to bring her “the Offering”.

The mummies descend upon the motel killing several patrons including the motel manager, being capable of reaching directly into peoples bodies and pulling out their organs. Molly and Carter are unable to find Kevyn and they realize the mummies have taken her as a virgin is needed for a final sacrifice so Aneh-Tet can begin world domination. Carter and Molly arrive at the tomb where they find Kevyn being prepped for sacrifice. Molly has armed herself with several sticks of dynamite (it's not revealed where she got the dynamite) and threatens Aneh-Tet with it allowing Kevyn to escape. Ben-David attacks Carter but is killed with a relic battle axe from the tomb. Several mummies chase after Kevyn as Sheriff Jones and acting deputy Sam arrive at the dig site, having found the bodies at the motel. Aneh-Tet instead uses Carter as a sacrifice, finding that he is a virgin and stabs him. The mummies attack the Sheriff's vehicle, killing him and Sam. Molly uses the sacrificial knife to stab Aneh-Tet before her ritual is complete causing her to return to her mummified state and her legion of undead to disintegrate. With Carter dead, Kevyn offers her virginal blood to Molly so they can bring Carter back to life with the ritual, which works and the credits roll.

== Cast ==
- Courtney Clonch as Molly Kirnan, a grad student and historical linguistics specialist
- Claudia Lynx as Aneh-Tet
- Bruce Boxleitner as Sheriff J.L. Jones
- Zach Galligan as Dr. Bryan Swatek, Molly's professor (whom she had a one-night stand with)
- Chad Michael Collins as Carter, Molly's ex, he holds her one night stand against her, also a student at the dig site
- Andrew Lauer as Sam Weave, county medical examiner
- Chase Hoyt as Justin, one of the students at the dig site, Kara's boyfriend
- Rhett Giles as Dr. Ari Ben-David, a professor from Cairo University investigating the newly uncovered tomb
- Emily Falkenstein as Kevyn, Molly's 17-year-old sister
- Amanda Ward as Kara, a student at the dig site, Justin's girlfriend
- Aaron David Thompson as Axel, a student at the dig site
- Amy Clover as Linda
- Patrick Thomassie as Santos
- Jared Cohn as Petrie (credited as Jared Michaels)
- Terry Shusta as Security Guard
- Heather Ashley Chase as Hotel Manager

== Reception ==
Dread Central reviewed the film shortly after its release in 2005. The review makes note that the original title of the film was Unravelled which the reviewer argues is a much more fitting title for the misleading "zombie movie-sounding" Legion of the Dead and also points out the Egyptian mummy cover art inexplicably borrowed from Ancient Evil 2: Guardian of the Underworld. It states the film is even more misleading by giving the stars Bruce Boxleitner and Zach Galligan roles "so inconsequential to the plot that if they’d been dropped altogether it would have had very little impact on the rest of the film". The review goes on to say that while the film is not the worst, it brings nothing new to the genre of mummy-horror movies and ends up feeling predictable.

FilmThreat.com gave the film a mostly negative review and did not recommend it to viewers. The review points out the many similarities between 1999's The Mummy and the plot of this film, also arguing that the movie does nothing original with the plot. The review makes mention that the DVD cover art lists that it "stars" Bruce Boxleitner and Zach Galligan, yet the two share barely 10 minutes of total screen time combined. It concludes by saying the film is ultimately "a badly diluted, horribly concluded, low budget version of a fairly decent movie".
