= Wicki =

Wicki is a surname. Notable people with the surname include:

- Alain Wicki, Swiss skeleton racer
- Berenice Wicki (born 2002), Swiss snowboarder
- Bernhard Wicki (1919–2000), Austrian actor and film director
- Franz Wicki, (born 1939), Swiss politician and lawyer
- Jean Wicki (1933–2023), Swiss bobsledder

== See also ==
- Wicki-Hayden note layout, a musical keyboard layout
- Wicky (disambiguation)
- Wiki (disambiguation)
