= Young Toscanini =

1988 film by Franco Zeffirelli

- Directed by: Franco Zeffirelli
- Written by: William Stadiem
- Produced by: Tarak Ben Ammar; Fulvio Lucisano
- Starring: C. Thomas Howell; Elizabeth Taylor
- Cinematography: Daniele Nannuzzi
- Edited by: Jim Clark; Amedeo Giomini; Bryan Oates
- Music by: Roman Vlad
- Distributed by: UGC (France); DLF (Italy)
- Release date: 7 October 1988
- Running time: 109 minutes
- Countries: Italy; France
- Languages: Italian; English

Young Toscanini (original title: Il giovane Toscanini) is a 1988 biographical drama film directed by Franco Zeffirelli and starring C. Thomas Howell and Elizabeth Taylor. It was screened out of competition at the 45th edition of the Venice Film Festival.

== Premise ==
The film, combining fact and fiction, charts the early career and romances of the conductor Arturo Toscanini in Rio de Janeiro in 1886.

== Cast ==
- C. Thomas Howell as Arturo Toscanini
- Elizabeth Taylor as Nadina Bulichoff (singing voice dubbed by Aprile Millo)
- Sophie Ward as Sorella Margherita
- Philippe Noiret as Dom Pedro II
- Franco Nero as Claudio Toscanini
- Pat Heywood as Mother Allegri
- Jean-Pierre Cassel as Maestro Miguez
- John Rhys-Davies as Claudio Rossi
- Valentina Cortese (cameo)
