= A Business Affair =

- Film poster
- Directed by: Charlotte Brändström
- Written by: Charlotte Brändström, Lucy Flannery (dialogue) Barbara Skelton (novel), William Stadiem (screenplay)
- Produced by: Willi Bär; Martha Wansborough
- Starring: Christopher Walken; Carole Bouquet; Jonathan Pryce
- Cinematography: Willy Kurant
- Edited by: Laurence Méry-Clark
- Music by: Didier Vasseur
- Production companies: OSBY Films; Canal+
- Distributed by: Les Films Number One (France); Entertainment Film Distributors (United Kingdom); Capella Films (Overseas)
- Release dates: 16 March 1994 (France); 27 May 1994 (United Kingdom)
- Running time: 102 minutes
- Countries: United Kingdom; France
- Language: English
- Box office: £0.02 million (UK/US)

A Business Affair is a 1994 romantic comedy film directed by Charlotte Brändström and starring Carole Bouquet, Christopher Walken and Jonathan Pryce. The film was produced by the United Kingdom in coordination with France, Germany and Spain and much of the film was shot in London. On one film poster of the film, Caroline Bouqet is featured with her arms wrapped around Big Ben with the two men beside her.

== Plot ==
The film centers on the life of Kate Swallow, and her susceptibility to falling in love with different men. At the beginning of the film, she is in love with a famous writer named Alec Bolton, who dismisses any intentions she has of writing a novel herself as nonsense, strongly discouraging her. Later, she falls in love with a man named Vanni Cors, the publisher of the firm for which Alec writes books, and she leaves Alec for Vanni. Kate later finds out that Vanni also does not think highly of her writing abilities, yet he has strung her along. Gradually, both men change their attitudes as they vainly struggle to win her affections.

Walken has a scene where he is able to perform his trademark tango routine.

== Cast ==
- Carole Bouquet as Kate Swallow
- Jonathan Pryce as Alec Bolton
- Christopher Walken as Vanni Corso
- Sheila Hancock as Judith
- Anna Manahan as Bianca
- Fernando Guillén Cuervo as Ángel
- Tom Wilkinson as Bob
- Marisa Benlloch as Carmen
- Roger Brierley as Barrister
- Jessica Hamilton as Vanni Corso's secretary
- Paul Bentall as Drunken Man
- Allan Corduner as Dinner Guest
- Marian McLoughlin as Dinner Guest
- Miguel De Ángel as Spanish Taxi Driver
- Christopher Driscoll as Policeman
- Beth Goddard as Student
- Fergus O'Donnell as Student
- Richard Hampton as Doctor
- Togo Igawa as a Japanese Golfer
- Rodolfo Recrio as himself

== Release ==
The film premiered in France on 16 March 1994, later screening in Germany on 5 May 1994. It opened in the United Kingdom on 27 May 1994 and Spain on 22 July 1994. It premiered in the United States in New York City on 3 November 1995.

The UK version ran for 102 minutes, but the US version has several scenes censored, particularly some of the scenes with nudity, and ran for 98 minutes.

== Reception ==
The film received a lukewarm critical reception. Walking Chronicles largely did not approve of the film, writing: "Unfortunately, as a whole, I can't endorse this film. It is a mediocre and half-baked romance that makes some ridiculous decisions in the third act, which subverts the strengths of all three leads".

It grossed £10,933 in its opening weekend in the United Kingdom from 15 screens. It grossed $7,556 in the United States and Canada.
