= Wicky =

Wicky may refer to:

== Flora ==
- Kalmia angustifolia, or wicky, a flowering shrub

== People ==
- André Wicky (1928–2016), Swiss racing driver
- Anton Wicky (born 136), educator and celebrity in Japan
- Edouard Wicky (fl. 1892), Swiss racing cyclist
- Jean-Claude Wicky (1946–2016), Swiss photographer
- Raphaël Wicky (born 1977), Swiss footballer

== See also ==
- Wicki (disambiguation)
- Wiki (disambiguation)
- Vicky (disambiguation)
