= The Yin and the Yang of Mr. Go =

1970 film by Burgess Meredith

- Film poster
- Directed by: Burgess Meredith
- Written by: Burgess Meredith (screenplay); Alvin Ostroff (story); Dick Randall (screenplay); Joseph Zucchero (story)
- Produced by: Jim Cranston (associate producer); Dick Randall (producer)
- Starring: Jeff Bridges; Irene Tsu; James Mason; Burgess Meredith; Broderick Crawford; Peter Lind Hayes
- Narrated by: Valentine Dyall
- Cinematography: Frank Johnson; John M. Stephens
- Edited by: Richard K. Brockway; Jack Tucker
- Music by: Nicholas Carras; Robert O. Ragland
- Distributed by: National General Pictures
- Release date: 1970
- Running time: 89 minutes
- Country: United Kingdom
- Language: English

The Yin and the Yang of Mr. Go is a 1970 British thriller film directed by Burgess Meredith. It was shot in Hong Kong and Toronto, Canada.

== Plot ==
An American army deserter, fanatic and aspiring writer named Nero Finnigan, living in Hong Kong becomes involved with the notorious Mr. Go, a half Chinese half Mexican organized crime mastermind. They conspire to blackmail an American weapons scientist, professor Bannister, into providing secrets to Mr. Go's organization for resale to the highest bidder, and Go secretly films the bisexual Bannister having sex with Nero.

Leo Zimmerman, who is an American CIA agent and James Joyce scholar, then arrives and is charged with recovering the scientist and his work by whatever means necessary.

== Cast ==
- James Mason as Y.Y. Go
- Jack MacGowran as Leo Zimmerman
- Irene Tsu as Tah-Ling
- Jeff Bridges as Nero Finnegan
- Peter Lind Hayes as Prof. Robert Bannister
- Clarissa Kaye-Mason as Zelda
- Burgess Meredith as The Dolphin
- Gigo Tevzadze as Dr. Ading
- King Hu as Ito Suzuki
- Broderick Crawford as Parker
- Jay Adler as Dr. Yul
- June Sampson as Miss Hagen

== Production ==
The film was shot on location in Hong Kong, except for the CIA boardroom scenes. The production ran out of money and was officially never completed. It was released in Southeast Asia as The Third Eye. The scenes featuring Broderick Crawford was believed to have been added later.

According to Irene Tsu, actor James Mason and director Burgess Meredith didn't get along and eventually didn't even speak to each other.
