= Skinner (film) =

- Region 1 DVD cover
- Directed by: Ivan Nagy
- Written by: Paul Hart-Wilden
- Produced by: Brad Wyman; Jeff Pollon; Tamar E. Glaser
- Starring: Ted Raimi; Ricki Lake; Traci Lords; Richard Schiff
- Cinematography: Greg Littlewood
- Edited by: Fred Roth; Peter Schink (as Peter Schenk)
- Music by: Keith Arem; Contagion
- Distributed by: 5 Kidd Productions; Cinequanon Pictures International Inc. A-Pix Entertainment; Image Entertainment; Simitar Video
- Release dates: 1993 (Italy); 1995 (U.S.)
- Running time: 90 minutes
- Country: United States
- Language: English

Skinner is a 1993 independent splatter / slasher film directed by Ivan Nagy and starring Ted Raimi, Traci Lords, Ricki Lake and Richard Schiff.

== Synopsis ==
Dennis Skinner is a handsome, likeable young man who is secretly a skid row slasher-style serial killer preying on sex workers. To avoid detection he moves from town to town, eventually ending up in his current location, where he rents a room from Kerry Tate, a married woman whose trucker husband Geoff is frequently out of town. Skinner immediately starts looking for new victims and also takes a job as a janitor. On his trail is Heidi (Traci Lords), a junkie prostitute who survived one of his brutal attacks and now desires revenge.

While skinning one of his victims Skinner monologues about growing up with a physically and mentally abusive father who worked as a mortician. After the death of his mother, Skinner's father forced him to watch as he prepared the body, culminating in his father removing his mother's face. Later that night Skinner returned to the mortuary and removed his mother's face as well, placing it over his own.

As the film progresses Skinner murders multiple women as well as a coworker who had been giving him a hard time. During this, Skinner has fostered a friendship with Kerry that turns sexual after she has a particularly bad fight with Geoff. Afterwards Skinner decides to show Kerry "the real him" by wearing the skin of one of his victims. When she reacts in terror, he abducts her and takes her to a remote warehouse he had been using as a lair. Geoff arrives home and encounters Heidi, who had been stalking Skinner. The two of them travel to Skinner's lair, where Geoff is incapacitated and later discovered by a security guard, who calls the police. Heidi and Skinner face off in a fight that leaves Heidi mortally wounded and Skinner incapacitated. As she dies, Skinner taunts her by saying that although he will be sent to a mental institution, he will inevitably be let back out into society as he knows how to present himself as cured, implying that he has already done this once before.

== Cast ==
- Ted Raimi as Dennis Skinner
- Traci Lords as Heidi
- Ricki Lake as Kerry Tate
- Richard Schiff as Eddie
- David Warshofsky as Geoff Tate
- Blaire Baron as Gloria
- Christina Englehardt as Rachel
- Time Winters as Night Watchman
- Roberta Eaton as Sandy
- De Wayne Williams as Earl
- Frederika Kesten as Suzanne
- Sara Lee Froton as Young Woman

== Production ==
Iván Nagy hadn't been interested in horror films, but due to the unconventional take Skinner had by having the protagonist be a serial killer Nagy decided to take on the film. To research his role as Dennis Skinner, Ted Raimi read up on real life serial killers like John Wayne Gacy and Ted Bundy.

== Release ==
Skinner initially premiered at the MIFED (Mercato internazionale del film e del documentario) Film Festival in Milan from October 24–29, 1993 and was released two years later in United States on home video on July 12, 1995, in both R-rated and unrated versions. A Blu-ray of the movie was released by Severin Films in 2019.

== Reception ==
A reviewer for The Roanoke Times in 1995 was critical, writing that when Nagy "gets more graphic, the story becomes bloody, sickening and more predictable. The really gory moments - meant to be frightening - could almost have come from a Troma "Toxic Avenger" movie."

Modern critics have been mixed. Bloody Disgusting did a retrospective on Skinner in 2023, stating that "With a little narrative direction, a few cut scenes (maybe one character completely) and a better ending, the film could have reached the cult status of something like William Lustig’s Maniac. Not to be, however, as it never really figures out how to land." Dread Central also reviewed the movie, noting that they found the dialogue and murder scenes disappointing but that "Despite some of these shortcomings, the film is highly entertaining and shockingly well done for a picture shot in around two weeks with little money."
