= Matthew Christopher =

American fashion designer

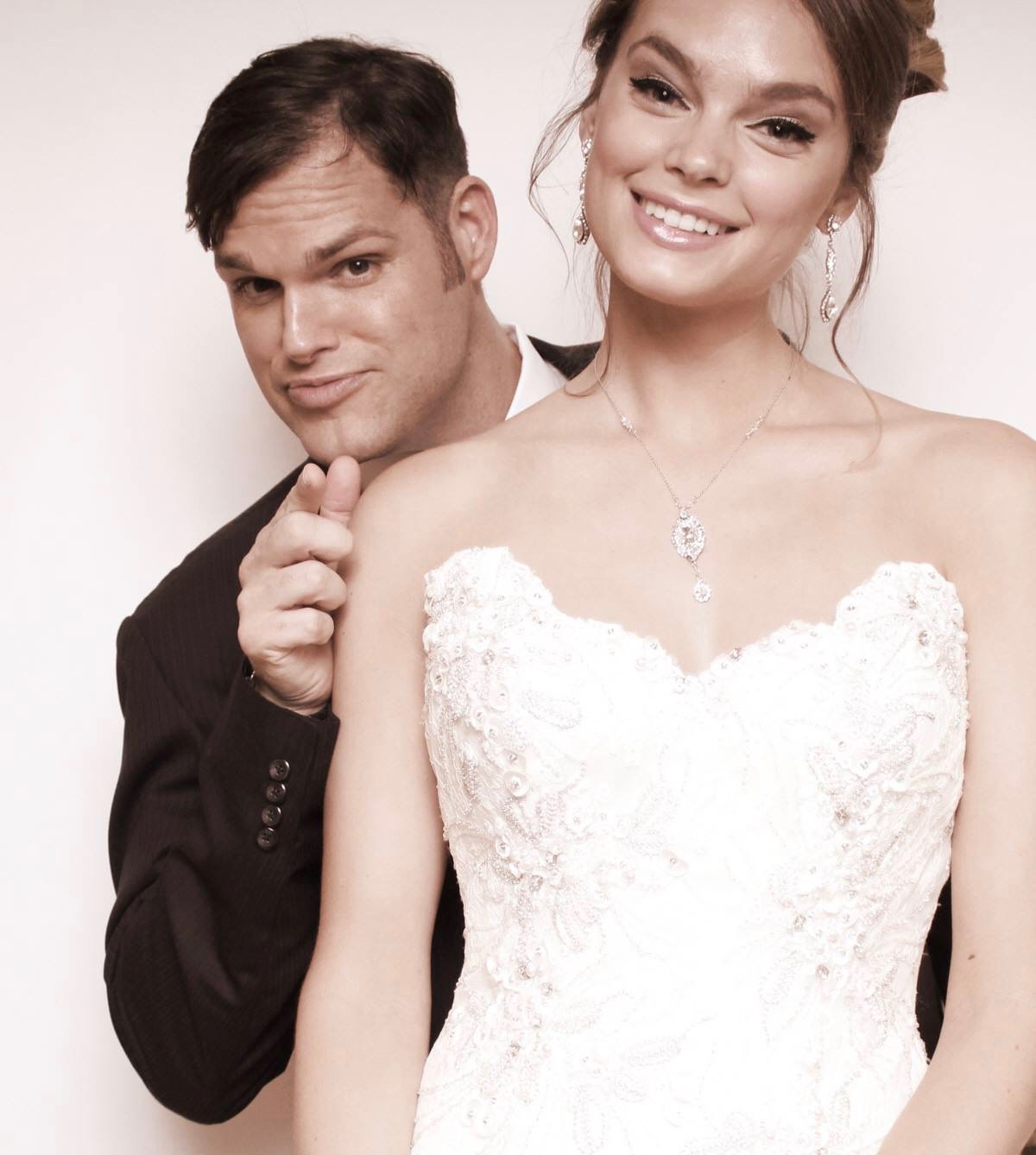
- Matthew Christopher on left, 2016
- Born: March 16, 1976 (age 50); Packwood, Iowa
- Education: Art Institute of Chicago; Iowa State University
- Occupation: Fashion designer
- Spouse: David J. Marchi (m. 2012; div. 2020)

Matthew Christopher Sobaski (born March 16, 1976) is an American fashion designer mostly known for bridal wear.

== Personal life ==
Christopher was born on March 16, 1976, in Packwood, Iowa, to Kenneth Sobaski, a hog farmer and Sandy Sobaski, a registered nurse. He attended the Art Institute of Chicago for one year before completing his studies at Iowa State University. He moved to New York City in 2000 to pursue a career in the field of couture designing, and started his fashion label in 2002.

== In popular culture ==
Christopher's designs for gowns are featured in movies including The Wedding Ringer with Kaley Cuoco. Christopher's list of clientele includes Carli Lloyd, Julie Lake, Several of Christopher's couture gowns and wedding dresses were covered in the January 2016 edition of Vanity Fair in a featured article. He makes a cameo in the documentary He Lied About Everything as the costume designer of Benita Alexander's dress.
