= Charles Birger =

American mobster (1881–1928)

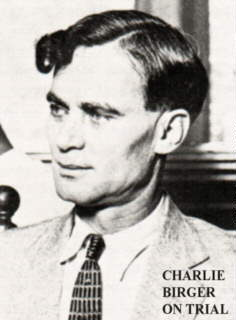
- Born: Shachnai Itzak Birger; February 5, 1881; Adygea, Russian Empire
- Died: April 19, 1928 (aged 47); Benton, Illinois, U.S.
- Cause of death: Execution by hanging
- Other name: Shachna Birger
- Occupations: Soldier, cowboy, miner, saloon keeper, bootlegger, criminal gang leader
- Known for: Bootlegging and leading the Birger Gang, who fought a bloody war with the Ku Klux Klan and the Shelton Brothers Gang over the domination of southern Illinois. Birger was the last person to be publicly hanged in Illinois.
- Status: Executed
- Conviction: Murder
- Penalty: Death

Birger Gang
- Founder: Charles "Charlie" Birger
- Founding location: Crab Orchard, Williamson County, Illinois
- Years active: 1920-1928
- Territory: Southern Illinois
- Ethnicity: Jewish
- Membership (est.): 16
- Criminal activities: Bootlegging, murder, proprietor of gambling houses
- Rivals: Shelton Brothers Gang

Charles "Charlie" Birger (born Shachnai Itzak Birger, February 5, 1881 – April 19, 1928) was an American bootlegger during the Prohibition period in southern Illinois.

== Early life ==
Charles Birger was born on February 5, 1881 in the Russian Empire to Jewish parents. The family immigrated to the United States when he was a child. They settled in St. Louis, which was also where he got a job as a news boy with the St. Louis Post-Dispatch newspaper when he was aged eight.

On July 5, 1901, Birger enlisted himself in the United States Army. He was stationed in South Dakota to Company G of the newfound 13th Cavalry Regiment. Throughout his time in the military, he was described as a good soldier. He was honorably discharged on July 4, 1904, at Fort Meade, South Dakota. After this endeavour, he became a cowboy. He eventually made it back to Illinois, where he met his first wife of four, Edna. The two had a daughter together.

Birger married again in 1921, this time with Beatrice Bainbridge of Harrisburg, Illinois. Charlie later became a miner in Harrisburg, where he was to eventually become a keeper at one of the local saloons.

== Bootlegger and gang leader ==
Following World War I, in 1919, the United States adopted national prohibition, which banned the sale, manufacture, and transportation of alcoholic beverages. Birger recognized this as a business opportunity, and in 1920 he joined forces with the Shelton Brothers.

Birger initially based his operation in Harrisburg, southern Illinois. The law authorities in Saline County eventually persuaded him to leave, and he built a fortified speakeasy called Shady Rest just across the line in Williamson County. Shady Rest stood next to old Highway 13, halfway between Harrisburg and Marion. A small barbecue stand just off the highway served as the guard shack.

Birger was involved in at least one murder and bootlegging activity in the Jackson County village of Dowell.

== War with the Ku Klux Klan ==
Charlie Birger and the Shelton Brothers Gang fought for control of the coal fields of southern Illinois, but their attention was diverted by a common enemy. In the 1920s, the Ku Klux Klan supported national prohibition. Alcohol was regarded as an "un-American" vice practiced by White ethnic immigrants, many of whom were Roman Catholics and other religions. Many of these immigrants worked in the coal mines of southern Illinois, living mainly in very small towns while maintaining a very strong ethnic pride. Alcohol was a part of their life, and bootlegging came naturally to them.

In the spring of 1923, the Klan began organizing in Williamson County, holding meetings attended by more than 5000 people. The Klan drew its support from both the farming community and people in the larger towns, the latter mainly of Scotch-Irish origin and belonging to the Baptist and other traditional Protestant churches.

The Klan soon found a charismatic leader in Seth Glenn Young, a 58-year-old former federal law enforcement officer. Large mobs began going door to door, forcibly searching houses for alcohol. If alcohol was found, the occupants were taken to Klan "prisons". Federal authorities apparently had deputized the Klansmen to aid in the enforcement of Prohibition.

Many elected public officials of Williamson County were viewed as being allies of the bootleggers, perhaps correctly. These elected public officials were driven from office and replaced by Klan members. The Illinois state government was either unable or unwilling to reestablish lawful authority.

On January 24, 1925, a shot was fired in the street in Herrin, Illinois. Deputy Sheriff Ora Thomas responded and walked into a cigar store, where he saw Klan leader Young. Thomas drew his pistol and shot Young twice. Young was able to shoot Thomas once before falling to the floor. Two of Young's companions, fellow Klansmen Edward Forbes and Omer Warren joined in the melee, and all four men were fatally wounded. The Klan held a public funeral for Young that was attended by more than 15,000 people.

In April 1926, Charlie Birger and the Shelton Brothers joined forces to attack the remaining Klan leaders in Herrin, using Tommy guns and shotguns. The police were called repeatedly, but chose not to respond. Three Klansmen and two anti-Klansmen were killed in a shootout. The Klan buried its dead and the coroner ruled that their deaths were homicides "by parties unknown".

Although the Klan's losses were not large, the Herrin attack broke the back of the local KKK. Lawfully elected local officials returned to their offices, and Birger and the Shelton Brothers went back into business.

== War with the Shelton Brothers Gang ==
Birger regarded Harrisburg as his hometown. When a small shop was robbed, Birger publicly made good the owner's losses and the suspected thief was found shot dead a few days later. This incident coincided with the start of his war with the Shelton Brothers Gang over local bootlegging control.

By October 1926, the Birger and Shelton Gangs were in open conflict. Both gangs built "tanks"—trucks converted into makeshift armored vehicles from which they could shoot. The Shelton Gang even tried to bomb Shady Rest from the air, but the dynamite that they dropped missed. Many were killed during the war, and sometimes it was not clear which side they were on. Three deaths in particular became important in ending Birger's own life.

Joseph Adams was the mayor of West City, Illinois, a village near Benton. Birger learned that the Sheltons' tank was in Joe Adams' garage for repairs, and demanded the tank. When Adams failed to surrender it, Birger's men orchestrated a drive-by bombing, destroying Adams' front porch.

In December 1926, two men, Harry and Elmo Thomasson, appeared at Joe Adams' house, announcing that they "had a letter from Carl [Shelton]". They handed a letter to Adams, and as he started to read it, they drew their pistols and shot him dead.

The following month, the Shady Rest was destroyed by a series of large explosions and an ensuing fire. Four bodies (one a woman's) were found in the ruins, charred beyond recognition. This was widely seen as a decisive blow struck by the Sheltons.

At about the same time, Illinois State Police Trooper Lory Price and his wife went missing. Price was widely believed to be associated with the Birger gang. He had been running a scam in which Birger stole cars and hid them until a reward was offered. Then the trooper pretended to find the cars and split the reward with Birger.

== Hanging ==
In June 1927, Birger was arrested on a charge of ordering the contract killing of Mayor Joseph Adams. Birger allowed himself to be taken into custody without a fight. He had been arrested many times, and had always been released a few days later. He may not have realized that the trial was to take place in Franklin County, which his political allies did not control.

Birger and the two men who did the killing were convicted. However, only Birger was sentenced to hang. Birger objected that it was unfair he should receive the death penalty while the confessed triggerman was sentenced only to prison in return for his cooperation with investigators.

Nevertheless, Birger was hanged for the murder of Adams on April 19, 1928, at the Franklin County Jail in Benton. At Birger's request, he was accompanied to the gallows by a rabbi and wore a black hood rather than a white one, since he did not want to be mistaken for a Klansman. Charlie Birger was the last man to be executed in a public hanging in Illinois. Birger shook hands with the hangman, Philip Hanna (the "humane hangman"), and his final words were, "It's a beautiful world." Local southern Illinois legend attests that Birger said "It's a beautiful day" in defiance, while the newspapers reported the remorseful "It's a beautiful world."

Birger's place as a southern Illinois folk legend is recorded in John L. "Ox" Gwaltney's "Charlie Birger":

I heard of Charlie Birger way back when I was young
My daddy told me all about the day that Charlie hung.

I've heard so many stories, some of his ghastly deeds
Another tells how Charlie helped poor folks in their needs.

One said he was a kindly man who never told a lie
But when somebody crossed him, that man was sure to die

That Charlie had no Master you can tell from all the tales
He fought the system all the way, and stayed out of their jails

I've seen so many pictures, they're hanging on the walls
The pictures tell the story of Birger's rise and fall

And when they finally caught him he was sentenced to be hung
But they hadn't broke his spirit the day the trap was sprung

When the State had had its vengeance—When Charlie's life was done
It made one stop to wonder, Who had lost, and who had won.

John Lastle Gwaltney Southern Illinois Poetry (1985)

Charlie Birger is buried in Chesed Shel Emeth Cemetery in University City, Missouri, a suburb of St. Louis. His marker bears his birth name of Shachnai Birger. His sister (Mrs. Rachel Shamsky), and one of his two daughters are buried nearby.

Birger's name entered the news again in 2006 when the granddaughter of the county sheriff who had supervised the execution sued the local historical museum in an attempt to regain possession of the noose used in the hanging.

== See also ==
- Bad Charleston Charlie, a highly fictionalized version of Birger's life story as a 1973 film comedy
- List of people executed in the United States in 1928
