= Fame for 15 =

American television series

- Country of origin: United States
- Original language: English

Production
- Executive producer: Gay Rosenthal
- Production companies: Gay Rosenthal Productions; The New TNN Originals

Original release
- Network: TNN

Fame for 15 is an American television series that aired on The Nashville Network from October 22, 2001 to November 10, 2001.

== Overview ==
The series profiled regular individuals who made headlines or were newsmakers for a brief time. People covered include Donato Dalyrmple, the fisherman who rescued Elián González, Scott O'Grady, Jim Morris, Darva Conger, John Wayne Bobbitt, Ellie Nesler, Divine Brown, Tommie Smith, George Holliday, the man who filmed the Rodney King video, and Who Wants to Be a Millionaire? winner John Carpenter.
