= Deadly Hero =

1976 film by Ivan Nagy

- Original film poster
- Directed by: Iván Nagy
- Written by: George Wislocki; Don Petersen
- Produced by: Thomas J. McGrath
- Starring: Don Murray; Diahn Williams; Lilia Skala; George S. Irving; Conchata Farrell; Ron Weyland; James Earl Jones
- Cinematography: Andrzej Bartkowiak
- Edited by: Susan Steinberg
- Music by: Brad Fiedel; Tommy Mandel
- Production company: City Time Partners
- Distributed by: AVCO Embassy Pictures
- Release date: December 14, 1975
- Running time: 102 minutes
- Country: United States
- Language: English

Deadly Hero is a 1975 American neo-noir thriller film directed by Iván Nagy, and starring Don Murray, Diahn Williams, James Earl Jones, Lilia Skala and Treat Williams in his film debut. Murray portrays a distrusted New York City police officer who becomes a cause célèbre after killing a perp, but comes under increasing scrutiny when the true circumstances of the killing are revealed.

The film was released by AVCO Embassy Pictures on December 14, 1975. It opened to mixed reviews, and was considered a commercial failure.

== Plot ==
Ed Lacy is an 18-year veteran of the New York City Police Department who finds himself demoted from detective back to patrol duty for his violent, racist tendencies and trigger-happy behavior. He still has friends on the job and is ingratiating himself as a booster for a politician named Kevin Reilly who is looking to become the next Mayor of the city.

Responding to a call on Manhattan's West Side, he finds a young musician named Sally has been abducted by a mentally unbalanced, Black stalker named Rabbit Shazam. Rabbit holds Sally hostage and threatens and scares her badly but does not actually hurt her physically. When her neighbor figures out something is wrong and calls the cops, Officer Lacy shows up and finds Rabbit holding Sally at knifepoint in the hallway. Rabbit quickly surrenders when Lacy threatens to shoot him, but during the arrest Lacy hits Rabbit and then angrily shoots him twice in the chest, killing him. In shock, Sally does not remember what happened and Lacy tells the detectives that Rabbit was holding the knife when he was shot, and she agrees to this. Lacy becomes a city hero and Reilly makes him a key part of his campaign.

However, Sally eventually recalls what really happened and tells the detectives that Lacy killed Rabbit while he was unarmed and had surrendered. Lacy tries to charm Sally into reverting fully into her original story, but she refuses. Lacy then becomes a public pariah and is forced to go on unpaid suspension, while Reilly cuts all ties with him. Lacy then becomes unhinged, threatening Sally directly and having a sleazy ex-cop "scare" her in a failed plot that leaves two civilians dead. With nothing left to lose, Lacy kills the ex-cop and then tracks Sally down to the Manhattan school where she works and kidnaps her and takes her out of the city to a pet graveyard. He ties her up and plans to shoot and bury her in the graveyard but she gets loose and stabs him with the pointed stand on her cello, severely wounding him and getting away into a forest. Sally stumbles across him holding a gun, and the movie ends ambiguously because he's either already dead or about to shoot and kill her.

== Cast ==
- Don Murray as Officer Ed Lacy
- Diahn Williams as Sally Deveraux
- James Earl Jones as Rabbit Shazam
- Lilia Skala as Edna Broderick
- George S. Irving as Kevin Reilly
- Ron Weyand as Captain Stark
- Conchata Ferrell as Slugger Ann
- Treat Williams as Officer Billings
- Hank Garrett as Det. Buckley
- Dick Anthony Williams as A.D.A. Winston
- Mel Berger as Arco
- Virginia Sandifur as Ellie Lacy
- Tom Kampman as Hunter
- Josh Mostel as Victor
- Rutanya Alda as Apple Mary
- Charles Siebert as Baker
- Bob Maroff as Sgt. Burns
- Charlie Welsh as Father Brady
- Danny DeVito as Harry
- Julie Csorba as Susan Lacy

Model Beverly Johnson and boxer Chu Chu Malave appear in bit parts. Punk/New Wave band Blondie and singer Iggy Pop appear as themselves.

== Production ==
Deadly Hero was directed by Ivan Nagy from a screenplay by George Wislocki and Don Petersen. It was shot entirely on location in New York City. It is Treat Williams' first motion picture appearance, as well as the first feature film of cinematographer Andrzej Bartkowiak. The working title of the film was Troubled Times.

== Release ==
Released in limited locales in 1975 with an R rating from the Motion Picture Association of America, it was distributed by AVCO Embassy Pictures.

=== Home media ===
Deadly Hero was released on VHS in the 1980s by Magnetic Video and in 1986 by Embassy Home Entertainment. The film was released on DVD on August 7, 2007, by Trinity Home Entertainment. On December 22, 2015, it was released on Blu-ray by Code Red Entertainment through Screen Archives Entertainment Exclusive.

== Reception ==
=== Box office ===
A commercial failure, George Anderson wrote in the Pittsburgh Post-Gazette that the violent film "suffered sudden death at the box office."

=== Critical reaction ===
Gene Siskel wrote in the Chicago Tribune that the film is "a small triumph" but qualifying that praise by noting, "Of course, expecting nothing helps." A reviewer for the Cineman Syndicate felt that "moments of suspense" helped elevate the "thin script and moody photography". A.H. Weiler of The New York Times described Deadly Hero as a "fairly derivative Manhattan melodrama" with the supporting cast "wasted in brief, broad portrayals". Los Angeles Times reviewer Linda Gross called the film "gritty" and "intriguing" but ultimately found it "predictable and pessimistic". Modern critics have been kinder with VideoHound's Golden Movie Retriever describing it as both "gripping" and "chilling" while rating the film three (out of a possible four) bones.
