= West City, Illinois =

- Village
- Location of West City in Franklin County, Illinois.
- Coordinates: 37°59′58″N 88°56′35″W
- Country: United States
- State: Illinois
- County: Franklin
- Township: Browning

Area
  - Total: 1.63 sq mi (4.21 km^{2})
  - Land: 1.61 sq mi (4.16 km^{2})
  - Water: 0.015 sq mi (0.04 km^{2})
- Elevation: 436 ft (133 m)

Population (2020)
  - Total: 656
  - Density: 408.0/sq mi (157.52/km^{2})
- Time zone: UTC-6 (CST)
  - Summer (DST): UTC-5 (CDT)
- ZIP code: 62812
- Area code: 618
- FIPS code: 17-80073
- GNIS feature ID: 2400128
- Website: www.villageofwestcity.com

West City is a village in Franklin County, Illinois, United States. It is adjacent to the county seat of Benton. The population was 656 at the 2020 census.

== History ==
In the late 19th century, West City was a small settlement adjoining Benton on the west. In the early 20th century many immigrants from Poland, Lithuania, and England settled in the West City area to work in the numerous coal mines.

On March 29, 1911, 33 citizens led by John Mulkey and represented by attorney Robert Hickman presented a petition to Judge Thomas J. Layman of the Franklin County Court to incorporate West City as a village. At that time there were 350 inhabitants. An election was held on April 15, 1911, and six trustees were elected: Ed McIntire, J. J. Sanders, L. I. Tombly, Ben Fletcher, Marshall Moore, and Jack Adams. On June 1, 1911, Judge Layman declared West City to be duly and legally organized under the general laws of the State of Illinois as the Village of West City.

When Congress passed the Volstead Act establishing national prohibition in 1919, West City became notorious for bootlegging and gambling. The Birger and Shelton Brothers gangs vied for control of illegal activities in the area. In April 1923, 34-year-old Joseph A. Adams, a huge man of nearly 300 pounds (140 kg) and a roadhouse operator, was elected mayor of West City. Leslie Reed was elected City Clerk. John Lairsey served as Treasurer and R. E. Neunlist was Village Attorney. The six elected trustees were Bruce Panchard, C. C. Gant, George Clinton, H. E. Stewart, W.R. Rogers, and R. N. Long.

Mayor Adams aligned himself with the Shelton Brothers Gang, thus becoming the bitter enemy of Charlie Birger and his men. On December 12, 1926, two of Birger's men knocked on Adams' door and told his wife they had a message for him. When Adams came to the door, they shot him in front of his wife Beulah and young daughter Arian. Sheriff Jim Pritchard gathered evidence and arrested Birger for the murder of Mayor Joe Adams.

Birger was tried in Benton and found guilty of ordering the killing, a charge he steadfastly denied. Birger was hanged in Benton on April 19, 1928, at 9:48 a.m., in the last public hanging in Illinois. A replica of the gallows was built in the 1990s by Birchard Wampler and his late son Birchard Neil Wampler. It stands today next to the old Franklin County Jail (now a museum).

After the sensational downfall of the Birger gang and the repeal of the Volstead Act in 1933, West City earned much of its income from legitimate taverns and nightclubs. During the 1940s and '50s this proved to be a very lucrative business.

Despite West City's notorious reputation during the 1920s, churches were established by the residents. Prospect, later called First Baptist, was the only organized church in the corporate limits of West City until 1921. Later Trinity Baptist and Harmony Freewill Baptist were established. Trinity Baptist is no longer in existence.

At one time there were three schools in West City limits: Old Jordon, Washington School and New Jordon School, located on South Central Street across from the present West City Village Hall.

On December 21, 1951, West City and all of Franklin County mourned 119 coal miners, who were killed in an underground explosion at C.W. & F. Orient #2 coal mine in West Frankfort.

In 1963, Interstate 57 split the village of West City down the middle from north to south. Preliminary work of buying homes and clearing the right of way began for the construction of Interstate 57 from Chicago to Cairo. Actual highway construction began in 1964, and its completion took nearly 10 years.

With the advent of I-57, Rend Lake Plaza was initiated in 1978. Wal-Mart and Big John's Supermarket were completed and in operation 1979. Many restaurants and various businesses soon followed, along with two big-city stoplights.

In 1978 a new Village Hall was built and West City expanded their police department, street and water department and the volunteer fire department.

== Geography ==
West City is bordered to the east and north by the city of Benton, the Franklin County seat. Interstate 57 passes through the center of West City, with access from Exit 71. I-57 leads north 23 miles (37 km) to Mount Vernon and south 20 miles (32 km) to Marion.

According to the 2021 census gazetteer files, West City has a total area of 1.63 square miles (4.22 km^{2}), of which 1.61 square miles (4.17 km^{2}) (or 98.95%) is land and 0.02 square miles (0.05 km^{2}) (or 1.05%) is water.

== Demographics ==
Historical population
Census	Pop.	Note	%±
1920	525		—
1930	1,091		107.8%
1940	1,017		−6.8%
1950	1,081		6.3%
1960	814		−24.7%
1970	637		−21.7%
1980	886		39.1%
1990	747		−15.7%
2000	716		−4.1%
2010	661		−7.7%
2020	656		−0.8%
U.S. Decennial Census

As of the 2020 census there were 656 people, 250 households, and 137 families residing in the village. The population density was 403.69 inhabitants per square mile (155.87/km^{2}). There were 326 housing units at an average density of 200.62 per square mile (77.46/km^{2}). The racial makeup of the village was 87.96% White, 1.22% African American, 0.76% Native American, 1.07% Asian, 0.00% Pacific Islander, 1.07% from other races, and 7.93% from two or more races. Hispanic or Latino of any race were 3.35% of the population.

There were 250 households, out of which 28.0% had children under the age of 18 living with them, 31.60% were married couples living together, 19.60% had a female householder with no husband present, and 45.20% were non-families. 37.20% of all households were made up of individuals, and 20.40% had someone living alone who was 65 years of age or older. The average household size was 3.35 and the average family size was 2.46.

The village's age distribution consisted of 29.1% under the age of 18, 7.0% from 18 to 24, 23.8% from 25 to 44, 23.9% from 45 to 64, and 16.3% who were 65 years of age or older. The median age was 34.0 years. For every 100 females, there were 112.1 males. For every 100 females age 18 and over, there were 96.4 males.

The median income for a household in the village was $37,813, and the median income for a family was $50,313. Males had a median income of $44,625 versus $28,750 for females. The per capita income for the village was $20,148. About 24.8% of families and 29.9% of the population were below the poverty line, including 48.6% of those under age 18 and 7.0% of those age 65 or over.
