= Wiki wiki dollar =

1960s gasoline give-away promotion

- Date: 1960s
- Location: United States
- Type: Advertising campaign
- Motive: Sales promotion
- Organized by: Chevron Corporation
- Participants: Irene Tsu

Wiki wiki dollar was a giveaway promotion in the United States from the Chevron gasoline company during the 1960s. The advertising campaign featured a Wiki wiki girl, played by dancer Irene Tsu, dressed in a grass skirt and performing a hula while standing on a gasoline pump.

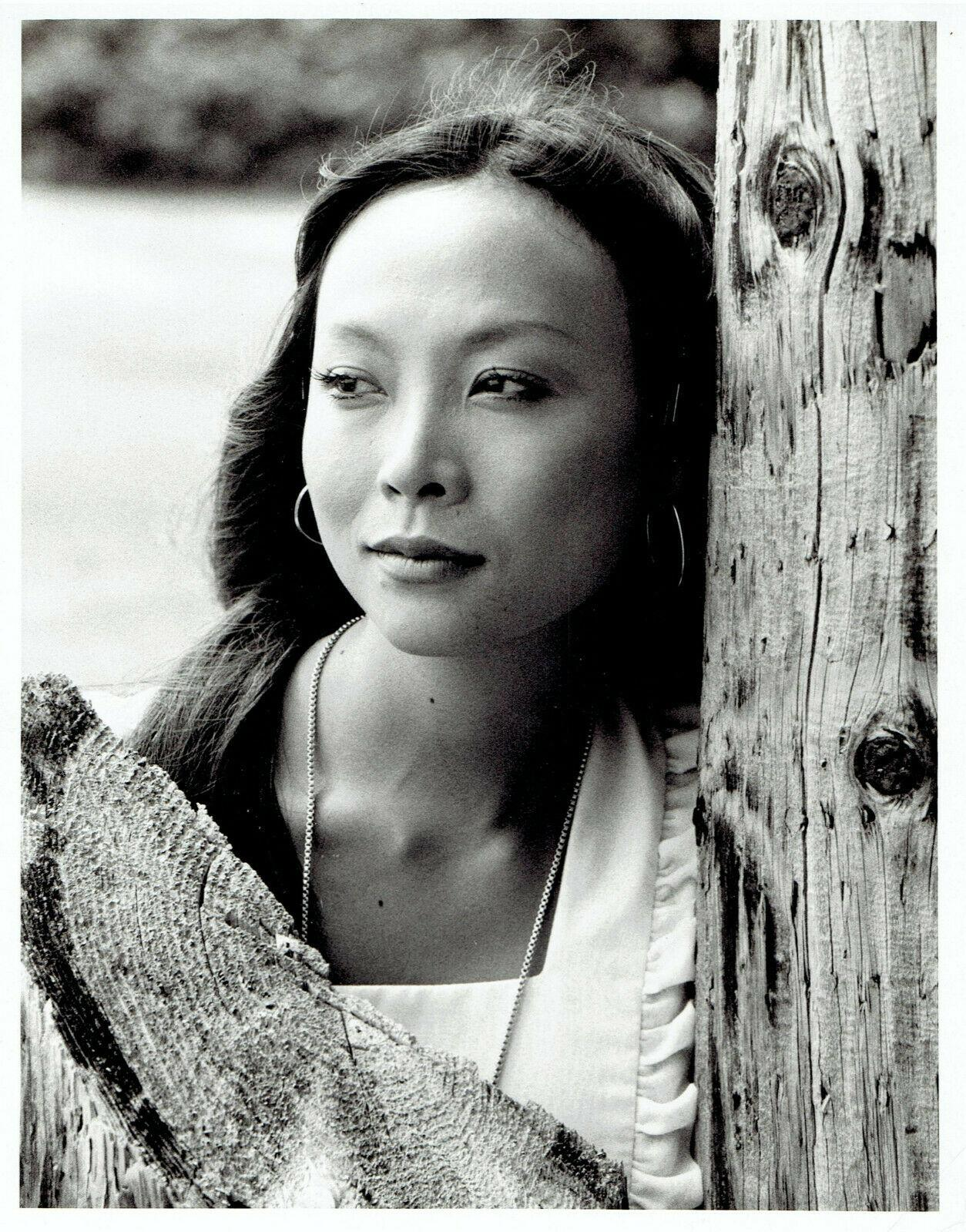
Irene Tsu

The National Petroleum News noted it was one of the many promotional gimmicks attempted by gasoline companies in the 1960s and described it as part of "a late Sixties West Coast duel" between Chevron and Shell:

Chevron paid game players "Wiki Wiki Dollars" of $1 to $2,500 for matching segments of game pieces and offered more than $2,300,000 in prizes as part of a "hula" bingo game.

In the San Francisco Express Times in 1969, editor Marvin Garson denounced the campaign as part of an article on Standard Oil, the corporate predecessor of Chevron. He wrote:

Standard debauches the public taste with its garish $2,300,000 hula-hula Wiki Wiki Dollar giveaway. Standard strangles the beauty of the American road.
