= Shelton Brothers Gang =

Illinois crime gang

- Founded: Shelton Brothers
- Founded by: Carl Shelton, Earl Shelton, Bernie "Red" Shelton
- Founding location: St. Louis, Missouri
- Years active: 1920-N/A
- Territory: Southern Illinois
- Ethnicity: European-American
- Membership (est.): 50+
- Criminal activities: bootlegging, gambling, mail robbery, murder
- Rivals: Charlie Birger Gang

The Shelton Brothers Gang was an early Prohibition-era bootlegging gang based in southern Illinois. They were the main rivals of the famous bootlegger Charles Birger and his gang. In 1950, the Saturday Evening Post described the Sheltons as "America's Bloodiest Gang". Ancestors of the Shelton Brothers Gang trace their roots back to Ireland, under the surname "Hunter". There are still some descendants living in the St. Louis, Fairfield IL, and Bloomington IL area today.

== History ==
Formed by Carl (born 1888), Earl (born 1890), and Bernie "Red" Shelton (born 1898) of "Geff" Jeffersonville, Wayne County, Illinois shortly after Prohibition came into effect in 1920, the gang operated in Williamson County, Illinois and Jackson County, Illinois, making moonshine and other illegal alcoholic beverages. They eventually dominated both gambling and liquor distribution in Little Egypt until 1926, when a former ally, gangster Charles Birger, attempted to take over the Sheltons' bootlegging operations. This began a violent gang war, which saw both sides use homemade armored trucks and included an aerial bombing raid by the Sheltons on Birger's Shady Rest headquarters. The battle was for the control of bootlegging in all of southern Illinois.

Despite having more than fifty gunmen, the Shelton Brothers were unable to defeat Birger. Based on the testimony of Birger and Art Newman, the Shelton Brothers were convicted of an unsolved 1925 mail carrier robbery of $15,000 and sentenced to 25 years in prison.

Without its leaders, the gang slowly faded, and Birger dominated bootlegging in Southern Illinois, until he was hanged in 1928 after being convicted of ordering the murder of West City, Illinois, Mayor Joe Adams, a Shelton partisan.

After their eventual release from prison, the Shelton brothers moved in to control gambling in Peoria, Illinois. However, Carl and Bernie Shelton (in 1948) were both murdered on orders from former gang member Frank "Buster" Wortman, who had taken over the Shelton operations in their absence and dominated St. Louis' illegal gambling and other criminal activities until his death in 1968. Earl Shelton was also ambushed and shot, but he survived. After a third attempt on his life in the early 1950s, Earl and his family left Illinois for Florida. Earl died there in 1986 at age 96, the last member of the Shelton Brothers Gang.

== Sources ==
- Fox, Stephen. Blood and Power: Organized Crime in Twentieth-Century America. New York: William Morrow and Company, 1989. ISBN 0-688-04350-X
- Kelly, Robert J. Encyclopedia of Organized Crime in the United States. Westport, Connecticut: Greenwood Press, 2000. ISBN 0-313-30653-2
- Sifakis, Carl. The Mafia Encyclopedia. New York: Da Capo Press, 2005. ISBN 0-8160-5694-3
- Sifakis, Carl. The Encyclopedia of American Crime. New York: Facts on File Inc., 2001. ISBN 0-8160-4040-0
