= William Stadiem =

American author

William Stadiem (born 1947) is an American non-fiction author who has written or ghost-written several biographies and autobiographies, mostly about the Golden Age of Hollywood, and restaurants. He also contributes to various magazines, and is an occasional screenwriter. Stadiem was formerly a lawyer at Sullivan & Cromwell on Wall Street before becoming the restaurant critic of Los Angeles (magazine). Stadiem was also a columnist for Andy Warhol's Interview magazine. Stadiem has written for The Daily Beast, the American Town & Country (magazine), The Tatler, Vanity Fair (magazine), Harpers & Queen, The Telegraph (magazine), and The Financial Times.

Stadiem has written or co-written screenplays for the following films and television series:

- A Business Affair (1994)
- Young Toscanini (1988)
- Pentathlon (1994)
- Trade Secrets a.k.a. Flagrant désir (1986)
- L.A. Law (1986-1994)
- JFK (Stadiem spent several months with Jim Garrison and wrote a 200-page script that covered Garrison's investigations and his fall from office, although this script was not the basis for the Oliver Stone film).

== Published works ==
- Madame Claude: Her Secret World of Pleasure, Privilege, and Power (2018)
- The Auctioneer: Adventures In The Art Trade (May 2016) with Simon de Pury
- Jet Set (2014)
- Daughter of the King (2014) with Sandra Lansky
- Moneywood (2013)
- A Class By Themselves (1980)
- Too Rich (1991)
- Marilyn Monroe Confidential (1979, 1983) with Lena Pepitone
- Lullaby and Good Night (1987) with Vincent Bugliosi.
- Madam 90210 (1993) with Alex Adams
- MR. S (2003, 2004) with George Jacobs
- Dear Senator (2009) with Essie Mae Washington-Williams
- Everybody Eats There (2007) with Maria Gibbs
