= Wiki (disambiguation) =

A wiki is a collaborative website.

Wiki may also refer to the following:

== People ==
- Wiki (rapper) (Patrick G. Morales, born 1993)
- Ruben Wiki (born 1973), New Zealand rugby league footballer
- Wiki Baker (Wikitoria Suvia Baker, fl. from 1958), New Zealand singer and community worker
- Wiki González (Wiklenman Vicente González, born 1974), Venezuelan baseball player
- Wieke Hoogzaad (nicknamed Wiki de Viking), Dutch triathlete

== Arts, entertainment and media ==
- Wiki, a fictional mini-robot in Jason of Star Command
- Wiki, a character in video game Zack & Wiki: Quest for Barbaros' Treasure
- Wiki Dankowska, a character in Coronation Street
- WIKI (FM) a country music radio station in Carrollton, Kentucky, United States

== Other uses ==
- .wiki, an Internet top-level domain name
- Wiki Peak, a mountain in Alaska, US

== See also ==
- Wicki, a surname
- Wicky (disambiguation)
- Wiki Wiki (disambiguation)
- Wikipedia:Glossary
- List of wikis
- Wikimedia Foundation, an American nonprofit organization
  - Wikipedia, a free online multilingual encyclopedia
  - Wikimedia movement, the global community of contributors to the Wikimedia projects
- Wiki software, or wiki engine or wiki application, collaborative software that runs a wiki
