= Iván Nagy (director) =

Hungarian film director

- Born: January 23, 1938; Budapest, Hungary
- Died: March 23, 2015 (aged 77); Los Angeles, California, U.S.
- Education: University of California, Los Angeles
- Occupations: Film director, television director, photographer
- Years active: 1973-2001
- Spouse: Irene Tsu (m. 1971; div. 1980)
- Partner: Heidi Fleiss (1987-mid-90's)

Iván Nagy (January 23, 1938 – March 23, 2015) was a Hungarian-American film and television director and photographer.

== Early life and education ==
Nagy was born in 1938 to Jewish parents in Budapest. He emigrated to the United States after the 1956 Hungarian Revolution, and graduated from University of California, Los Angeles.

== Career ==
Prior to his filmmaking career, Nagy was an accomplished still photographer. He won a "Best Album Cover" Grammy Award for B. B. King's 1970 album Indianola Mississippi Seeds. He made his directorial debut with 1973's Bad Charleston Charlie, a low-budget crime comedy based on the life of bootlegger Charles Birger. In 1975, he directed Deadly Hero, a thriller about a corrupt police officer, starring Don Murray, James Earl Jones and Treat Williams (in his film debut).

Nagy then transitioned to largely directing television series, including CHiPs, Starsky & Hutch, and The Hitchhiker, with the exception of the 1993 slasher film Skinner.

Following his 1993 arrest, his career hit a slump, and he spent the rest of his career making pornographic films, before retiring in 2001. In 2017, he briefly left retirement to produce the low-budget film horror film Hitchhiker Massacre.

== Personal life ==
Nagy was married to actress Irene Tsu from 1971 to 1980.

=== Association with Heidi Fleiss ===
Nagy was a convicted bookmaker, and was the former boyfriend of Hollywood madam Heidi Fleiss. Nagy had introduced Fleiss to Madam Alex in 1987. In August 1993, the Los Angeles Times reported that Nagy was arrested for allegedly procuring women to work as prostitutes for Fleiss. Nagy denied any involvement in Fleiss' vice ring. Charges against Nagy were ultimately not pursued.

He was featured in the documentary Heidi Fleiss: Hollywood Madam.

=== Death ===
Nagy died in 2015 in Los Angeles, aged 77.
