= Elizabeth Adams (madam) =

American madam and prostitute

- Born: 1933 or 1934; Manila, Philippines
- Died: July 8, 1995; Cedars-Sinai Medical Center, Los Angeles, California, United States
- Other names: Madam Alex; Alex Adams
- Occupation: Madam

Elizabeth Adams, known as Madam Alex and sometimes Alex Adams (1933 or 1934 (Note: Aged 17 in 1951 and 56 in the November 1989 Vanity Fair article. and stated as 60 in a March 1993 Los Angeles Times article, stated as being aged 60 in the obituaries.) – July 8, 1995) was an American madam.

== Early life and career ==
Originally from Manila, with Filipino, German and Spanish ancestry, Adams said she arrived in San Francisco at the age of 17 in 1951. She had married twice by the early 1970s and by then had been divorced and widowed once. By her own account, after periods as a florist and owner of an antiques shop, she switched to becoming a madam around 1971 after buying a book from a visiting English madam for $5,000, although half of the individuals listed turned out to be deceased.

Adams operated a prostitution ring in Beverly Hills for more than 20 years. Under the pseudonym Alex Fleming (one of several), she sent young women to hotels in the district and on cruises charging $300 for two hours and up to $2,000 for a whole day, including for periods accompanying men to Europe and on cruises in the Caribbean. By the late 1970s, about 80 percent of Adams' clients were reported to be from the Middle East, especially from Saudi Arabia. She conducted most of her business from her bed, using the telephone for discussions with her clients and deciding on their ideal female partner for the evening. According to Vanity Fair, Madam Alex had about 150 women working for her at the peak and was earning $100,000 a month taking a 40 percent cut. Adams assisted Sydney Biddle Barrows, the so-called 'Mayflower madam' of Manhattan, informing Barrows of suitable clients to add to her list.

== Convictions and later life ==
Court records indicate Adams was arrested on four occasions between 1972 and 1983, on charges of pimping and pandering, and convicted of pandering in 1974 and 1982. She was arrested in April 1988 on two counts of pandering and one count of pimping when the District Attorney had sufficient evidence; an undercover female police officer posed as a potential sex worker and provided evidence via a clandestine tape recording, as well as a testimony from one of her women.

After law enforcement officers testified that Adams had provided information about homicide suspects, drug dealers and terrorists, plea-bargaining led prosecutors to agree that she should receive a probation order lasting 18 months when the case came to court in 1991. She later claimed Heidi Fleiss, for whom she had originally been a mentor, had stolen her list of clients. Fleiss said she was Adams' assistant at the time of her own arrest in 1993, but a female officer of the LAPD alleged Fleiss was Adams' "number one 'girl'".

A theft of jewelry from Adams' home was reported in late 1992 and partially solved in March 1993; the Los Angeles Police Department (L.A.P.D.) returned the few recovered items, along with 16 of her personal notebooks. Madam 90210: My Life as Madam to the Rich and Famous, written by Adams in collaboration with William Stadiem, was published in 1993.

Adams died at the Cedars-Sinai Medical Center in Los Angeles, (reputedly) at the age of 60, after open heart surgery and the ending of life support. Her son, Scott, also of Los Angeles, survived her.

== In popular culture ==
Adams was the inspiration behind the character Madam Nadja played by actress Tracey Ullman in the comedy series Tracey Takes On...
