= Government of Nevada =

Government of the state of Nevada

- Polity type: Federated state
- Constitution: Constitution of Nevada

Legislative branch
- Name: Nevada Legislature
- Type: Bicameral legislature
- Meeting place: Carson City
- Presiding officer: Marilyn Dondero Loop (D), President pro tempore
- Upper house
- Name: Nevada Senate
- Lower house
- Name: Nevada Assembly
- Presiding officer: Steve Yeager (D), Speaker of the Nevada Assembly

Executive branch
- Head of state
- Currently: Governor of Nevada Joe Lombardo (R)
- Head of government
- Currently: Governor: Joe Lombardo (R); Lieutenant Governor: Stavros Anthony (R); Secretary of State: Cisco Aguilar (D); Treasurer: Zach Conine (D); Attorney General: Aaron Ford (D); Controller: Andy Matthews (R)

Judicial branch
- Name: Judiciary of Nevada
- Courts: Supreme Court of Nevada; Nevada Court of Appeals; Nevada District Courts
- Supreme Court of Nevada
- Chief judge: Chief Justice Douglas W. Herndon
- Seat: Carson City and Las Vegas

The government of Nevada is organized under the Constitution of Nevada of 1864 and divided into three branches of government. The executive branch consists of six independently elected officers, including the governor, lieutenant governor, secretary of state, attorney general, treasurer, and controller. The legislative branch is bicameral and comprises the Nevada Legislature, which includes the Assembly (lower house) and the Senate (upper house). The judiciary is headed by the Supreme Court of Nevada, which organizes and oversees the states appellate, district, justice, and municipal courts.

The state is subdivided into one independent city, the state's capital Carson City, and 16 counties: Clark, Washoe, Lyon, Nye, Elko, Douglas, Churchill, Humboldt, White Pine, Pershing, Lander, Mineral, Lincoln, Storey, Eureka, and Esmeralda. Each county is governed by an elected, partisan board of county commissioners. Unlike other states, county commissions in Nevada do not have to follow the separation of powers doctrine the state and federal governments must follow and in 2015, were granted functional home rule by the Legislature.

In addition to counties, Nevada has more than 100 special-purpose, overlapping, county-equivalent political subdivisions including health, water, school districts and 43 judicial townships. Unlike in other states, townships are not general purpose municipal governments. Nevada instead has judicial townships for the purpose of creating limited jurisdiction courts staffed by elected justices of the peace.

As independent county-level governments, school districts are consolidated at the county-equivalent level, except for two: a special-purpose state-wide publicly-funded charter school district (the Nevada State Public Charter School Authority or SPCSA) and one comprising schools at state correctional facilities. Other political subdivisions below the state level include a variety of water authorities, health districts, and regional special-purpose improvement districts created by the legislature.

After European settlement and prior to statehood in 1864, modern-day Nevada was previously governed by a succession of informal, popular governments as well as formal governments. These included the Nevada Territory from 1861 to 1864 and the Utah Territory from 1851 to 1861 in the United States. Non-permanent settlements between 1820 and 1848 were nominally part of Alta California and Santa Fe de Nuevo México.

== Constitution and laws ==
The cover page for the telegraph containing the Constitution of Nevada sent to the United States Congress for ratification.

Drafted by a convention of delegates, Constitution of Nevada is the supreme state law became effective on October 31, 1864 when the Nevada Territory achieved statehood.. Based on the 1848 Constitution of California, the majority of the Constitution's framers not only were from California but had served in government there.

Three primary bodies of law apply state-wide and include the Constitution of Nevada, Nevada Revised Statues (NRS), and the Nevada Administrative Code (NAC). The current codified laws of Nevada are the Nevada Revised Statues, which include the legislation passed by the Legislature and signed by the governor. Executive agency regulations adopted by any of the executive branch agencies are codified as the Nevada Administrative Code.

=== Nevada Revised Statutes ===
Nevada Revised Statutes are the annotated codification of Nevada's laws, the United States and Nevada constitutions, certain court rules, various special and local acts, and other materials deemed appropriate by the legislative counsel of the Legislative Counsel Bureau.

Organized by subject matter, the laws are divided first into titles, each embracing a single topic, then into chapters covering specific subjects within that topic, and finally into individual sections, each immediately followed by its legislative history. The legislative history is denoted by numbers in brackets and parentheses corresponding to the page and year in the Statutes of Nevada where the section was originally derived or amended.

The NRS also contains comparative tables, a comprehensive index, and various annotations appearing after each provision, which may include reviser's notes explaining substantive provisions, cross-references to related statutes, administrative or constitutional provisions, and summaries of relevant court decisions, attorney general's opinions, or opinions of the Nevada Commission on Ethics.

=== Statutes of Nevada ===
The Statutes of Nevada are the session laws and are a printed and bound compilation of all laws and resolutions enacted by the Legislature for a specific legislative year, published for every session since the establishment of the Nevada Territory. An indexed edition of the statutes are normally available within a few months of the close of a session. Prior to the final indexed version, a temporary, softbound compilation known as the advance sheets, which contains the same laws and resolutions in the same order and includes an index and locator tables are published.

Bills and resolutions appear in the Statutes of Nevada in the same form as the enrolled copies filed with the secretary of state, with new material printed in bolded italics and deleted material enclosed in brackets with strikethrough. Laws are arranged by chapter number assigned by the secretary of state in the order received from the governor.

In addition to the complete text of all laws and resolutions, the Statutes of Nevada contain indexed copies of the United States and Nevada constitutions, along with an index and several tables identifying amended, repealed, or newly added sections and chapters of the Nevada Revised Statutes, as well as selected special and local acts. The reprint of the NRS incorporates the statutory changes adopted during the previous session.

=== Nevada Administrative Code ===
The Nevada Administrative Code (NAC) is the codified body of permanent regulations adopted by executive branch agencies. This process is governed by the Nevada Administrative Procedure Act, contained in NRS Chapter 233B. Under that law, certain bodies are exempt from these rule-making provisions and may write their own regulations, such as the governor, the Department of Corrections, and the Gaming Control Board among others.

Rulemaking may begin when the legislature mandates it, when an agency acts within its statutory authority, or when a member of the public petitions for it. Of the three types of regulation—permanent, temporary, and emergency—only permanent regulations become part of the NAC; temporary regulations expire by limitation, and emergency regulations last no more than 120 days.

The Nevada Register of Administrative Regulations, similar to the United States Federal Register, is published monthly by the Legislative Council Bureau, a body within the Legislature that acts on its behalf in between sessions, and is available online. Permanent regulations are added to the NAC upon approval by bureau.

Temporary and emergency regulations do not become part of the NAC, though both appear in the Register. For a temporary regulation to become permanent, the agency must anticipate the expiration date and submit a permanent regulation under the normal procedures. Emergency regulations must be endorsed by the governor and a regulation may be adopted by the emergency procedure only once. Regulations of agencies exempt from Chapter 233B are not included in the NAC unless the bureau authorizes their inclusion.

== Legislative ==
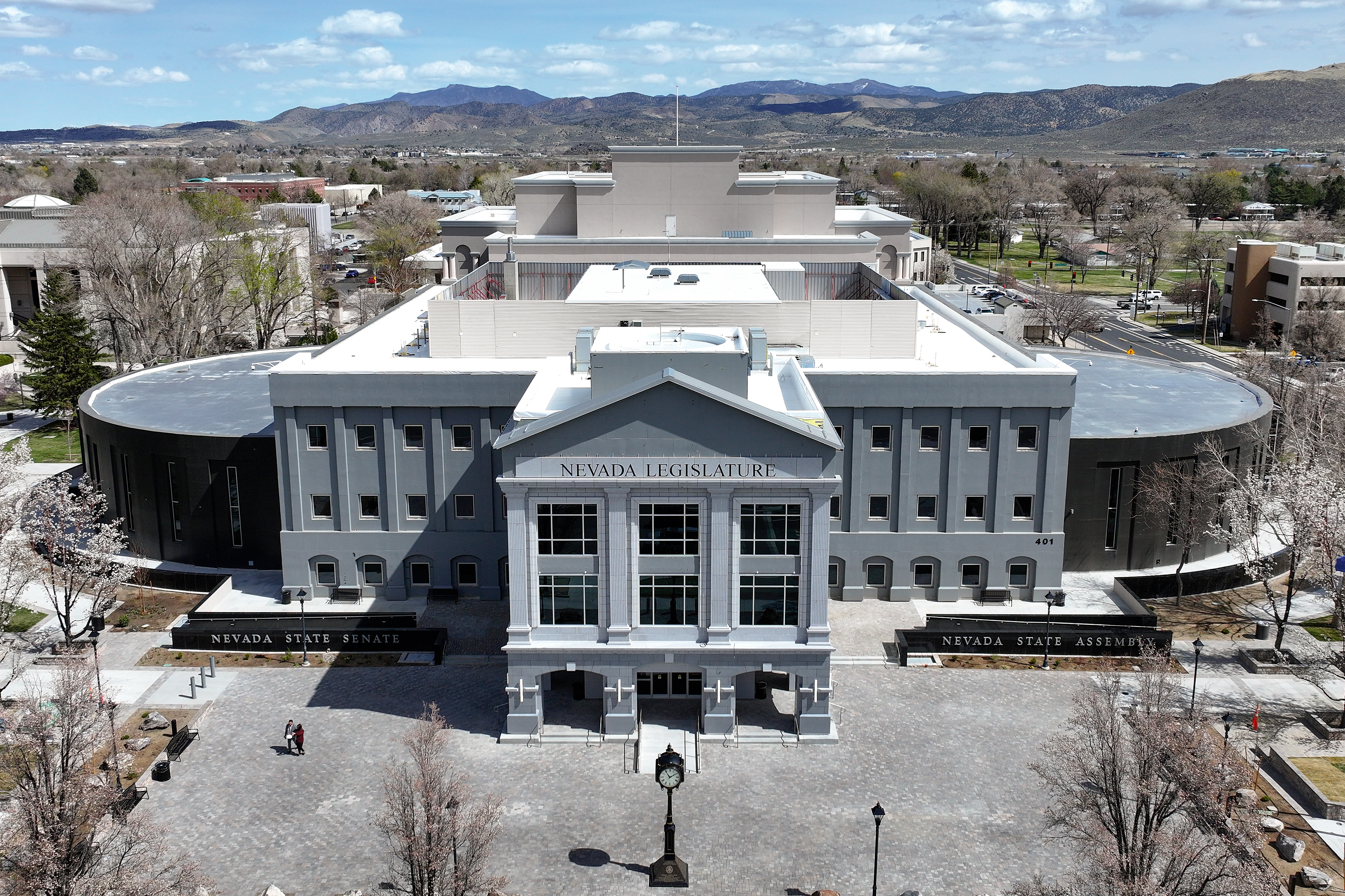
The Nevada Legislative Building.

The Nevada Legislature is the bicameral state legislature of the U.S. state of Nevada. Formed by the state's constitution of 1864, the Legislature consists of the Nevada Assembly, its lower house with 42 members and the Nevada Senate, its upper house with 21 members. The Constitution does not set a minimum size of the Legislature, but it does set a maximum of 75 legislators with the Senate not less than a third nor larger than a half of the size of the Assembly.

Regular sessions of the Legislature are biennial (once every two years), begin on the first Monday in February in odd-numbered years, and may not exceed 120 days. Originally, the Constitution limited the sessions to 60 days. In 1958, the 60 day-limit was removed by constitutional amendment. A trend towards longer and more expensive sessions was the primary motivator of the consitiutional amendment limiting sessions to 120 days.

Special sessions can be called by the governor and, since 2013, by the Legislature itself if two-thirds of lawmakers agree. Legislative work continues between sessions in standing committees and the Nevada Legislative Counsel Bureau.

In 2019, Nevada became the first U.S. state with a female-majority legislature. As of most recent 83rd (2025) legislative session, women retain 62% of the seats overall and within each chamber, the highest in the nation.

As of 2025, members of the Democratic Party have a majority in both chambers since 2009.

With a total of 63 seats, it is the nation's third-smallest state legislature after Alaska (60) and Delaware (62).

=== Legislative Counsel Bureau ===
Nye Building of the Nevada Legislature in Las Vegas.

The Nevada Legislative Counsel Bureau is a legislative state agency that provides research, legal, fiscal, and administrative support to the Nevada Legislature. Created in 1945, it maintains offices in Carson City and Las Vegas and is supervised by the Nevada Legislative Commission, a twelve-member bipartisan body drawn from the Assembly and Senate that meets between the state's biennial sessions. The commission appoints the bureau's director, who holds the title of Legislative Counsel and serves as the commission's nonvoting recording secretary.

The bureau is divided into five units, including administrative, audit, fiscal analysis, legal, and research divisions. Each division is headed by an administrator appointed by the commission. Their responsibilities include personnel and IT support, performance and financial audits of executive agencies, revenue forecasting and budget analysis, bill drafting and legal opinions, and policy studies and legislative histories. The research division also operates the bureau's library and produces publications, among them the Political History of Nevada, a reference work maintained with the secretary of state since 1910 and issued in a twelfth edition in 2018.

During sessions, staff draft bills, support committees and floor proceedings, analyze amendments, and prepare fiscal notes. Between sessions, the bureau serves interim committees, tracks compliance with audit recommendations, supplies budget analysis to the interim finance committee, and reviews administrative regulations. The agency employed roughly 300 permanent staff as of 2018, supplemented by temporary session hires, and its employees are barred from lobbying, campaign work, and political advocacy.

=== Legislative Building ===
The Legislature, Supreme Court, and governor originally shared the State Capitol in Carson City that was built between 1870 and 1871. Constructed from local sandstone with a silver-colored cupola 120 feet (37 m) tall and cost less than $100,000 in 1870 (equivalent to $2,546,053 in 2025). Just after 1900, an octagonal annex was added to in order to house the Nevada State Library. Later, the Capitol doubled in size when wings were added to the north and south ends of the building. However, signs of aging became apparent by 1950 when the Legislature developed a plan to demolish the building and rebuild it from the ground up.

In 1959, the Legislature changed plans and decided instead to undergo a complete restoration of the building, the funding for which was passed in 1977. During its restoration, the entire building was gutted and retrofitted for modern building codes and earthquake resistance and installed a new Alaskan marble foyer. The original dome was replaced with a fiberglass construction replica.

In 1931, the Supreme Court moved into its own building, as did the Legislature in 1971 when it moved to the Nevada State Legislative Building, making Nevada one of three states whose legislature does not meet in its Capitol building (the other two being Alabama and North Carolina). Presently, the Capitol building houses five of Nevada's six elected executive constitutional officers: the governor, secretary of state, treasurer, lieutenant governor, and controller. The attorney general's office is in another building.

== Executive ==
Executive officers of Nevada as of June 2026

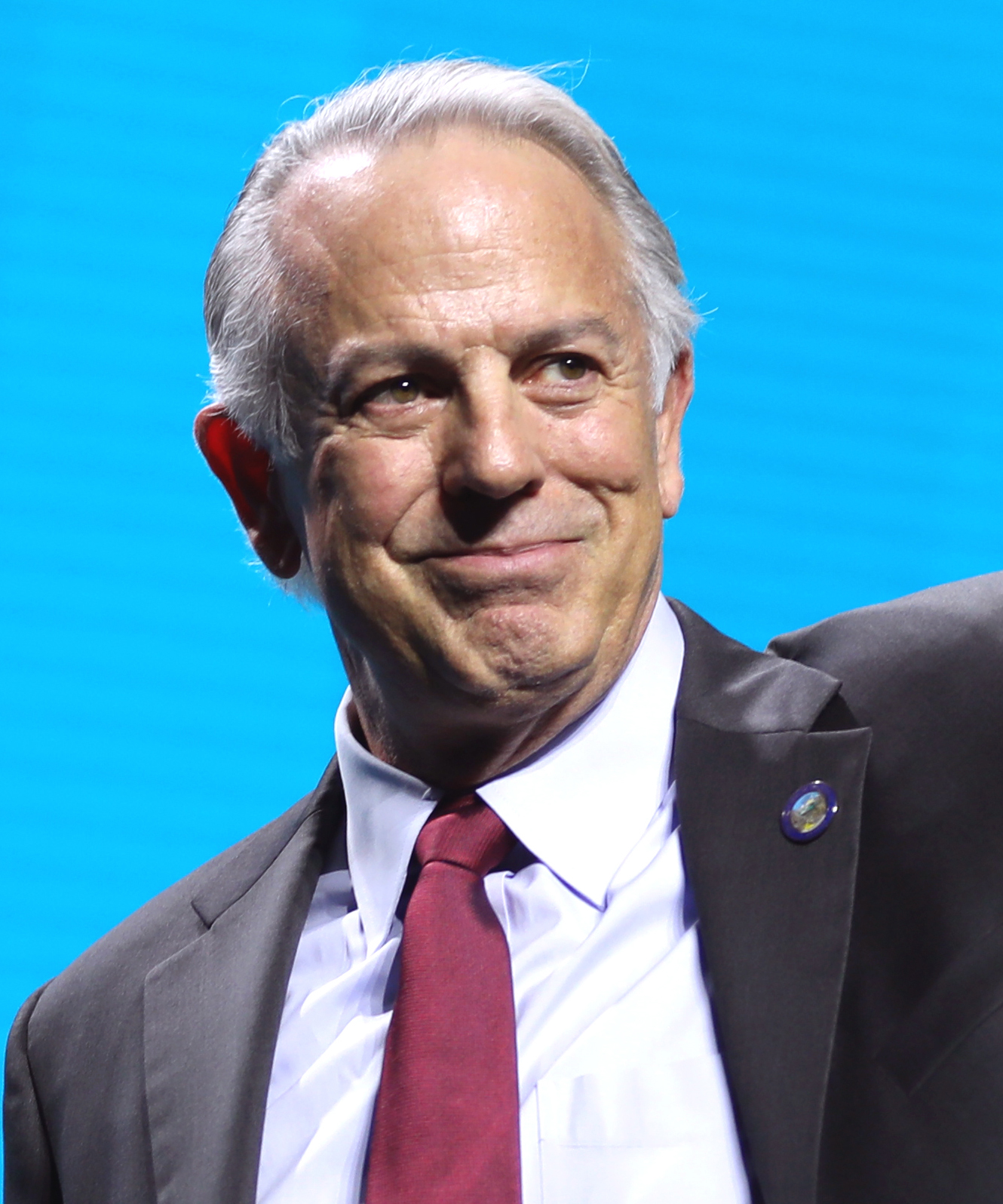
Joe Lombardo _{(R)}
Governor
(since 2023)

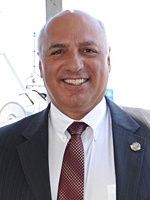
Stavros Anthony _{(R)}
Lieutenant Governor
(since 2023)

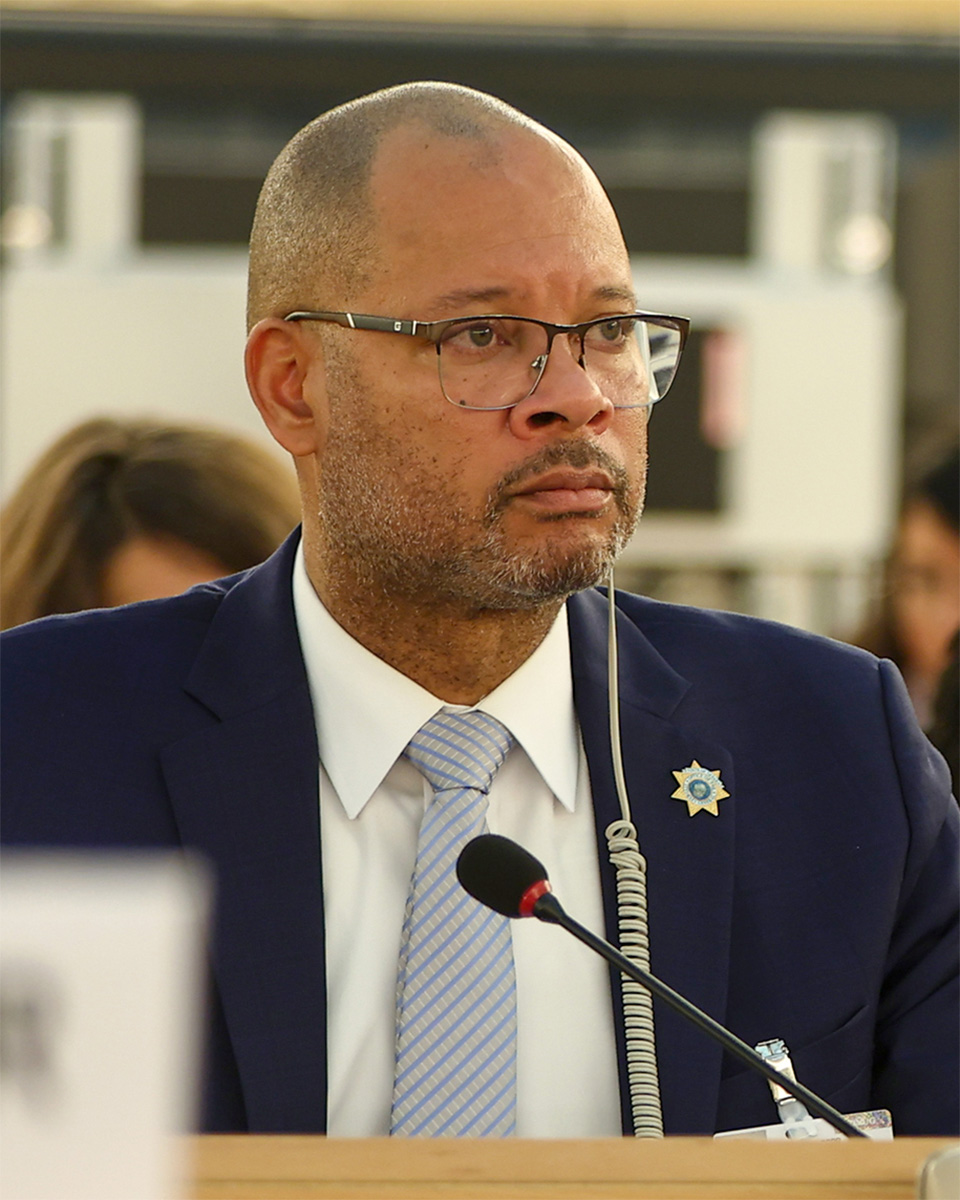
Aaron Ford _{(D)}
Attorney General
(since 2018)

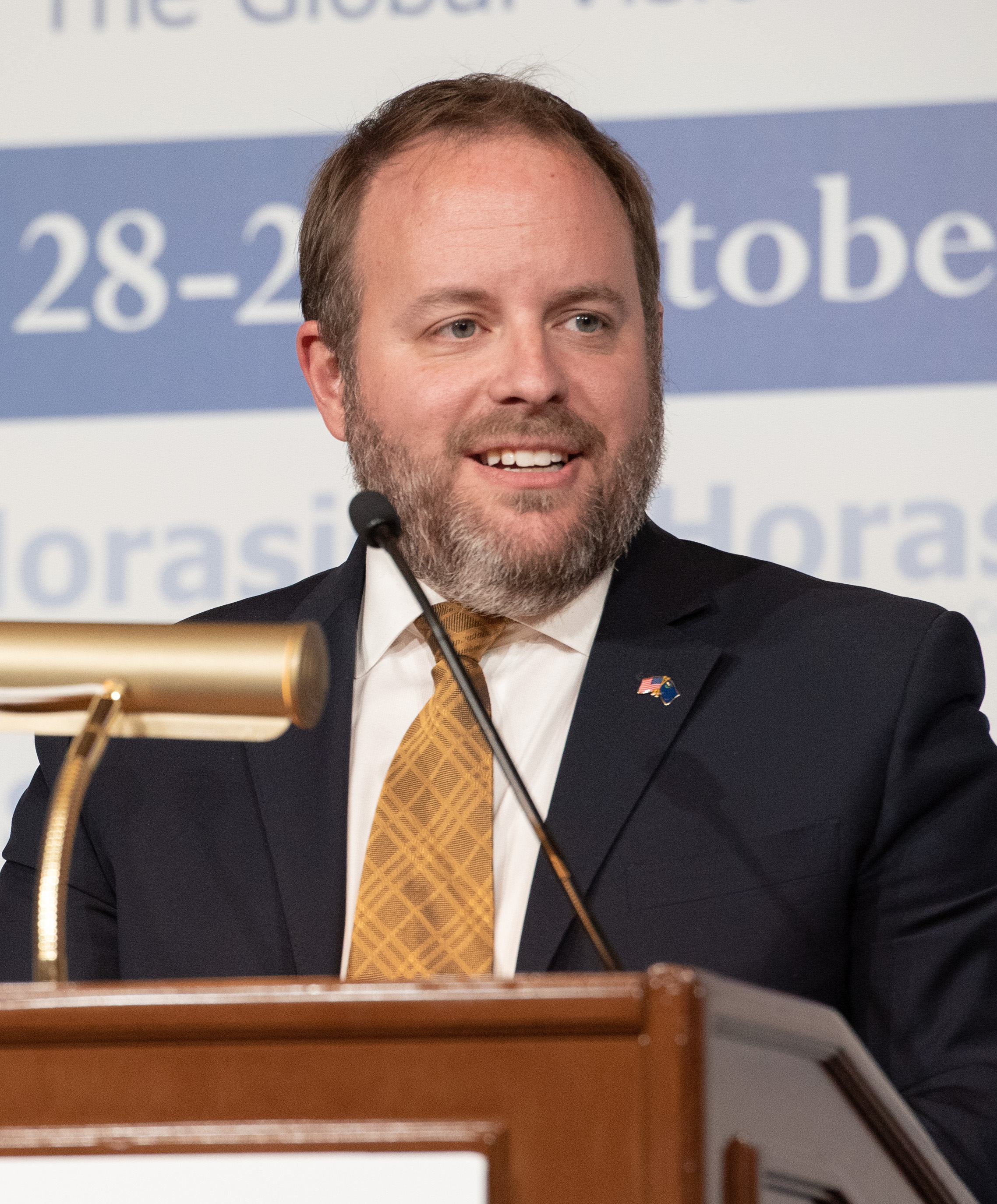
Zach Conine _{(D)}
Treasurer
(since 2018)

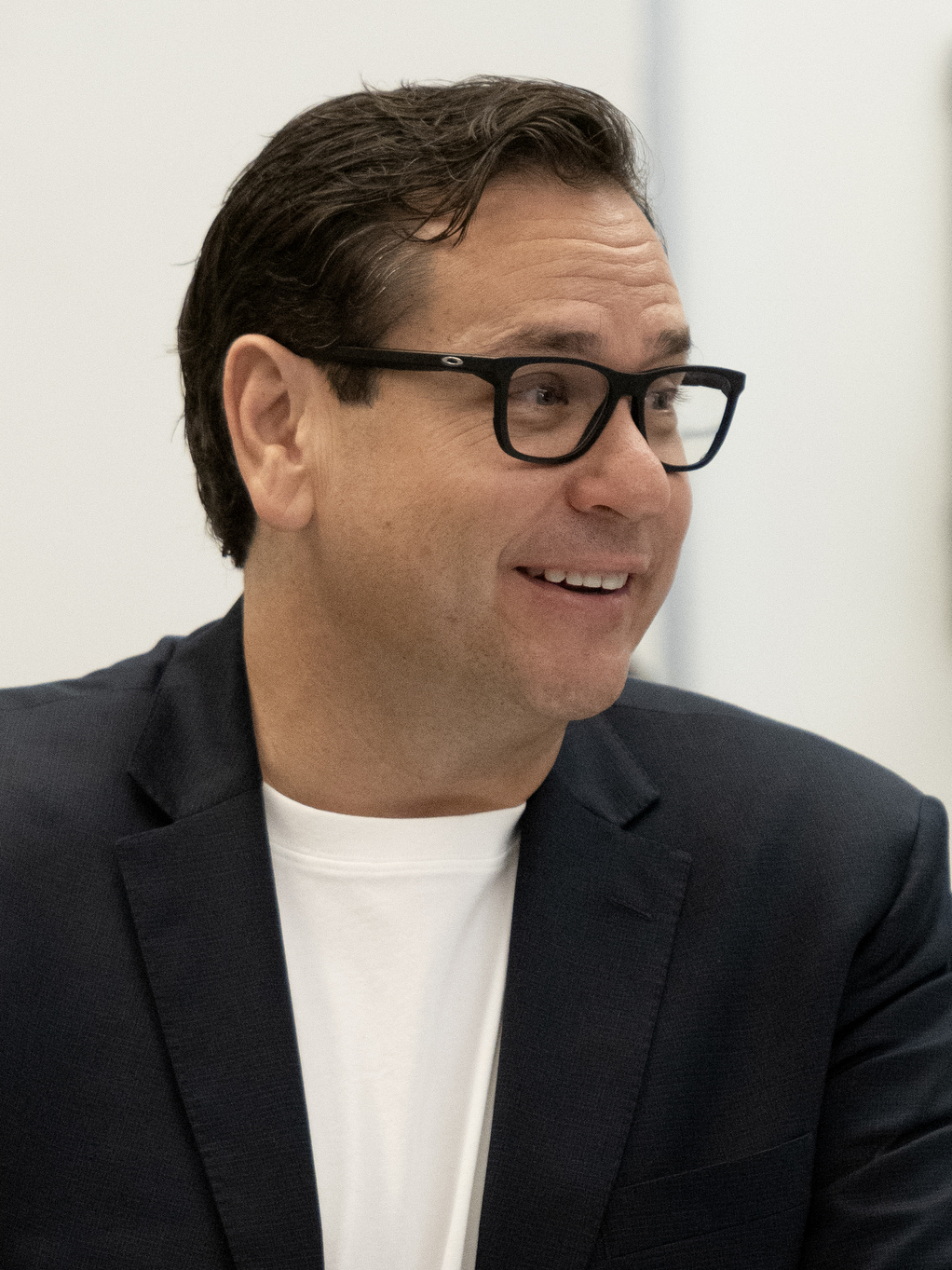
Cisco Aguilar _{(D)}
Secretary of State
(since 2023)

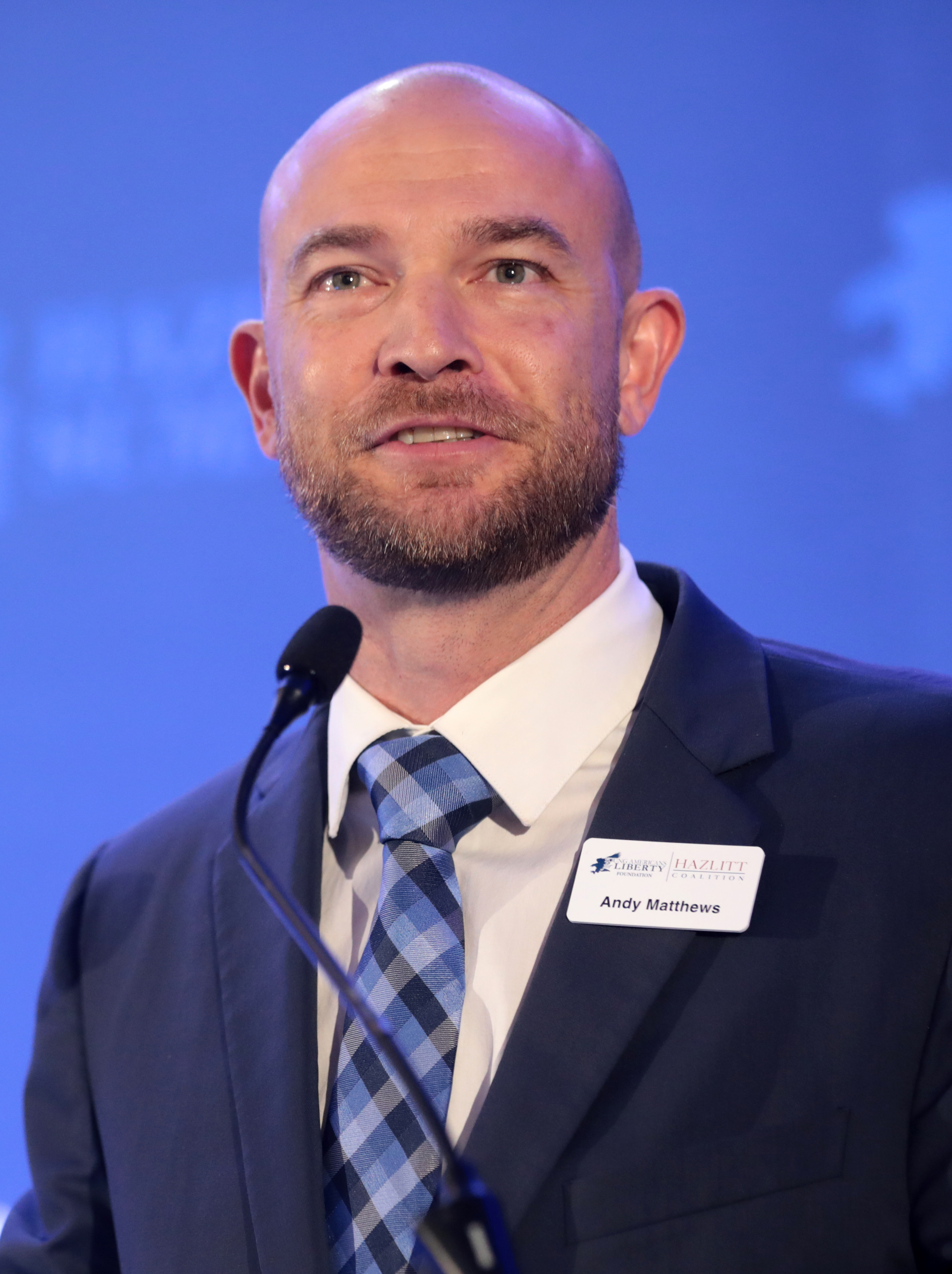
Andy Matthews _{(R)}
Controller
(since 2023)

Nevada's executive branch is a plural executive in six independently elected constitutional officers, including governor, lieutenant governor, secretary of state, attorney general, treasurer carry out the duties of the executive. Despite this shared power, the chief executive is considered to be the governor, who is also the head of state and supervises a majority of state agencies. However, the governor has no authority over the other executive officers, nor can the governor remove any of them from office.

Executive officers in Nevada may be removed from office upon a successful recall election by voters or by impeachment by the Legislature. Nevada's impeachment process is similar to the federal process. The Assembly requires a simple majority to pass articles of impeachment, after which the Senate conducts the trial and may vote to convict and remove from office. The difference between the federal and Nevada's process is that the two-thirds majority required for conviction and removal in the Senate must be a two-thirds of all members in the body, not merely two-thirds of those present and voting.

The original 1864 constitution created eight total statewide executives and included the surveyor general and the superintendent of public instruction. Voters approved constitutional amendments in 1954 and 1956 which made them positions appointed by the governor.

Nevada's six executive officers do not need to seek the advice and consent of the Legislature in order to appoint the heads of executive agencies, largely due to the fact that the legislature meets biennially and to approve each appointment would be impractical. In order to prevent abuse of power that could come from not providing legislative oversight on appointments, Section 1 of Nevada's Constitution grants the Legislature the right to review and approve executive regulations before they become effective as Nevada Administrative Code and the retains the power to veto executive regulations with a simple majority. When the Legislature is out of session, the Legislative Counsel Bureau can act on its behalf as in most other scenarios.

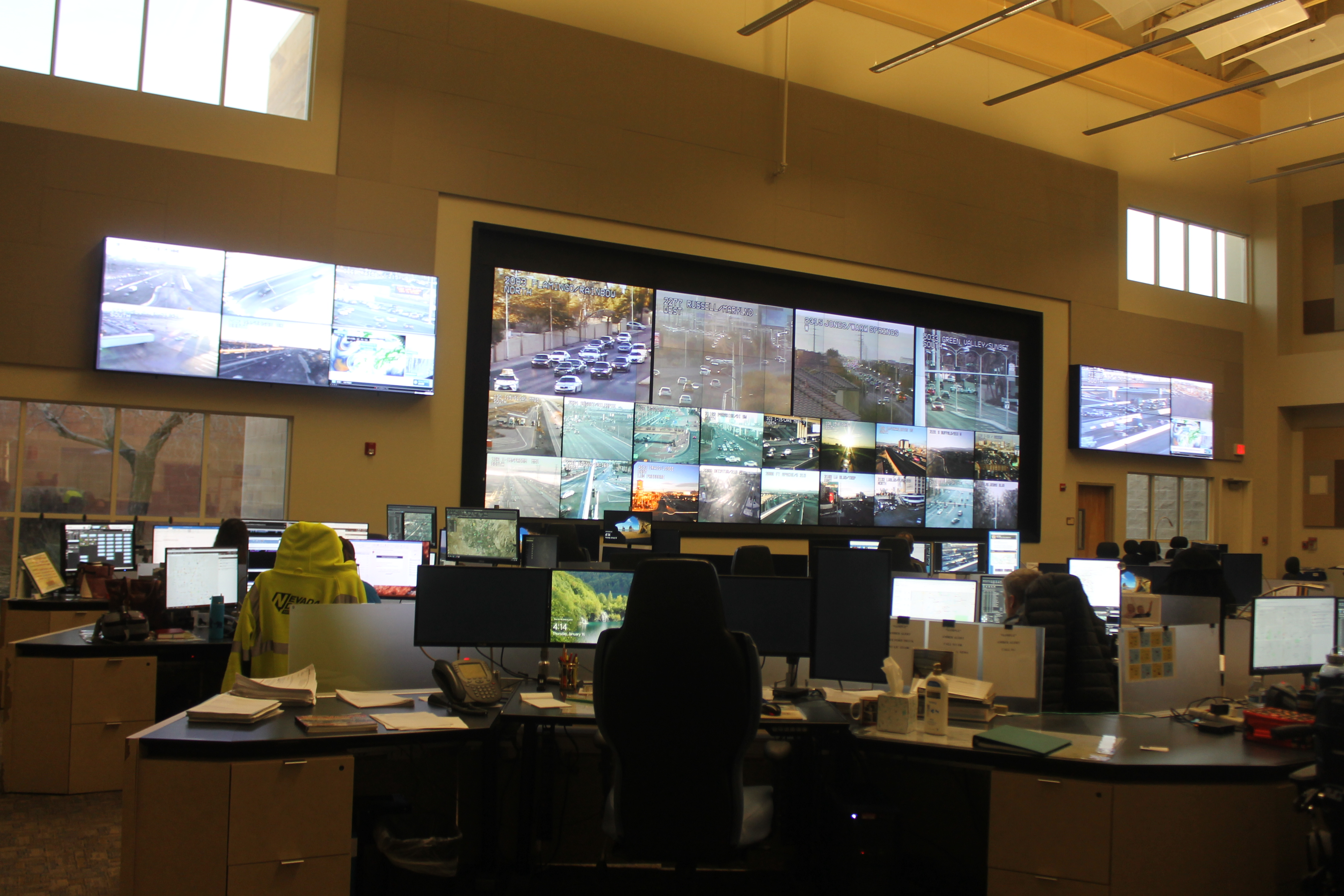
Nevada State Police and Department of Transportation dispatch center in Carson City.

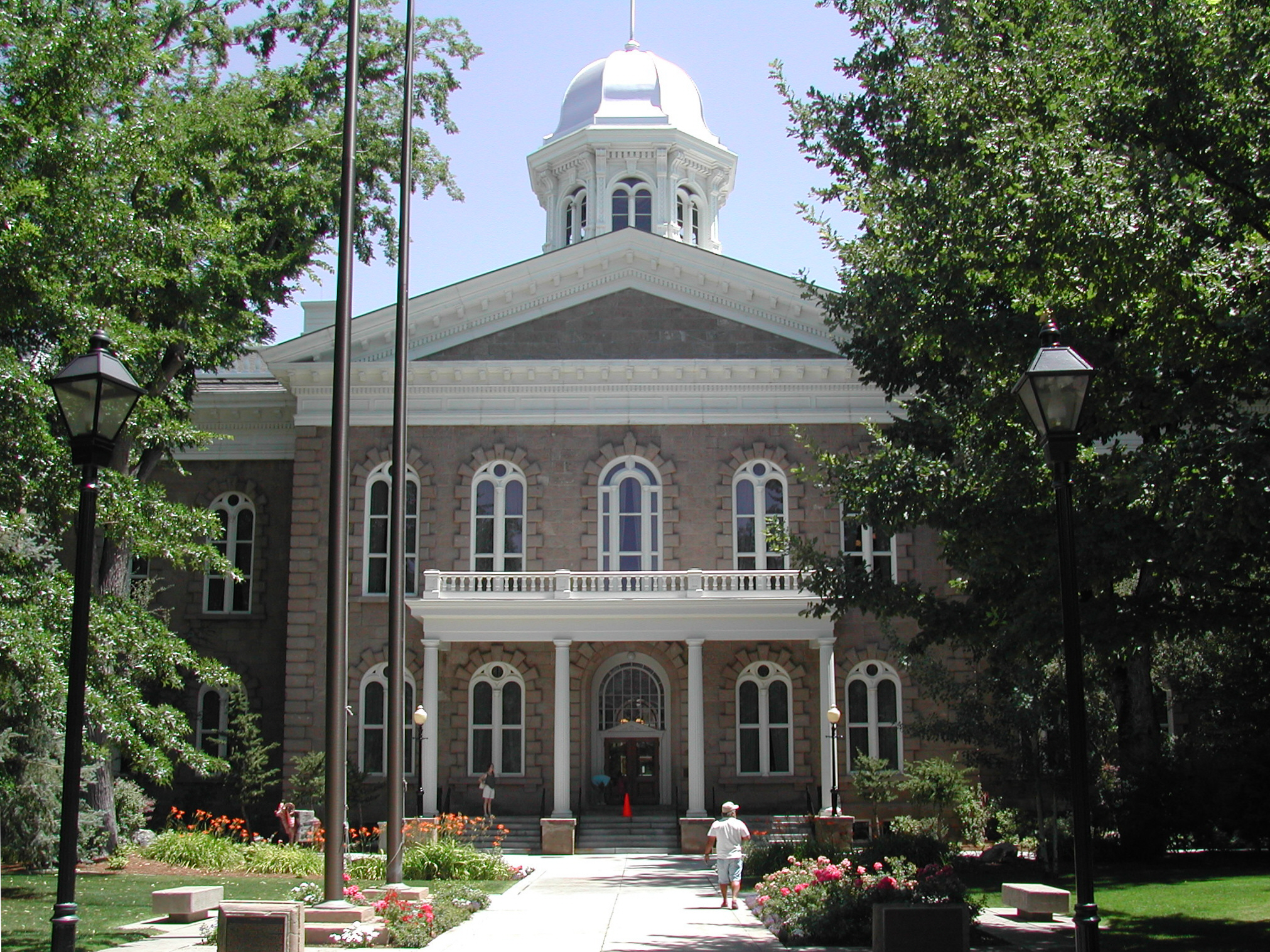
The capitol building was left by the Legislature in 1971, leaving the capitol to house the primary offices of all of Nevada's executive officers, except for the attorney general.

=== Governor ===
The governor of Nevada serves as the head of Nevada's plural executive and has a duty to ensure the faithful execution of state law. However, the governor is limited in performing these duties since the governor does not have authority over any of the other five executive officers. A large responsibility of the governor is to appoint, as of 2024, the top position (and deputies) of 80 state agencies and departments. In addition, the governor appoints the members of around 200 boards, commissions, and committees created by law, several of which the governor is statutorily a member.

The governor Board of Pardons Commissioners, as the governor is the only member of the board with an absolute veto authority, as well as the Transportation Board of Directors as well as the Board of Examiners.

The governor serves a four-year term. Candidates must be at least twenty-five years of age and must have been Nevada residents for at least two years before election.

Similar to the federal system, Nevada's governor can be impeached by the legislature's lower house, the Assembly with a simple majority for the articles of impeachment. The upper house, the Senate, would conduct the trial. A two-thirds majority vote is required to convict the governor and remove him from office. Unlike the federal system, both the Assembly's vote to impeach and the Senate's conviction and removal in Nevada are counted against the elected number of members in that body, not merely those present for the vote. As of 2025, it would require 22 votes to impeach the governor in the Assembly and at least 14 votes in the Senate.

As of June 2026, the current governor is Joe Lombardo, a Republican.

The Lincoln Building in Las Vegas houses offices of the Aging and Disability Services Division of the Nevada Department of Health and Human Services.

=== Attorney general ===
The attorney general serves as Nevada's chief law enforcement officer, overseeing a statewide team of over 300 staff members who provide legal counsel and representation for all state agencies, including boards and commissions. The attorney general is responsible for criminal jurisdiction over consumer, Medicaid, mortgage, and insurance fraud, public integrity crimes committed by government employees, and human trafficking offenses, among others, with the goal of protecting vulnerable populations.

In addition to prosecutors, the attorney general's office operates a criminal investigations division staffed by nearly fifty sworn peace officers authorized to investigate these offenses. The attorney general's wide-ranging duties also include participation on multiple State boards and committees, such as the Board of Examiners, Board of Prison Commissioners, Board of Pardons Commissioners, Executive Branch Audit Committee, Advisory Committee on the Administration of Justice, Domestic Violence Prevention Council, Substance Abuse Working Group, Prosecution Advisory Council, and Technological Crime Advisory Board.

As of June 2026, the current attorney general is Aaron Ford, a Democrat.

=== Treasurer and controller ===
Although the Nevada state treasurer and controller are mandated by the Nevada Constitution, the constitution does not specify any of the duties for either office. Instead, the duties and responsibilities of the officers elected to hold each position are have changed and specified through acts of the Legislature and are codified in Nevada Revised Statutes.

In effect, the treasurer and controller are two halves of the state's financial system. Because of the similarities and overlap of each office, there have been attempts to combine the offices, including in 1995 and 1999, which were unsuccessful.

In 2004, Republican Controller Kathy Augustine became the only state-wide elected officer to be successfully impeached by the Nevada Assembly, which voted unanimously to impeach her on three articles charging her with improper use of state employee and state resources regarding her 2002 election campaign. However, she was not removed from office after the Nevada Senate unanimously convicted her of one of the three charges, but did not remove her from office.

As of June 2026, the current treasuerer is Zach Conine, a Democrat, while the controller is Andy Mathews, a Republican.

==== Treasurer and controller duties ====
The treasurer serves as of the state's money, and serves as the official cashier and receives money owed to the state and expends money the state owes to other entities or individuals. However, the treasurer may only expend state money upon the receipt of a financial warrant issued by the controller.

The controller serves as the state's bookkeeper and functions as the chief auditor when there is a claim made against the state in addition to issuing financial warrants (orders to pay a bill) to the treasurer for payments made by the state.

=== State executive agencies ===
Significant Nevada state agencies within the executive branch include:

* State Athletic Commission
- Bureau of Mines and Geology
- Colorado River Commission
- Department of Conservation and Natural Resources
- Department of Cultural Affairs
- Department of Education
- State Ethics Commission
- Division of Forestry
- Gaming Commission
- High-Speed Rail Authority
- Commission on Ethics
- Department of Agriculture
- Department of Business and Industry
- Department of Employment, Training, and Rehabilitation
- Department of Health and Human Services
- Department of Motor Vehicles
- Department of Tourism and Cultural Affairs
- Department of Transportation
- Division of Child and Family Services
- Executive Ethics Commission
- Film Office
- Indian Commission
- Legislative Ethics Commission
- Office of Economic Development
- Public Employees' Benefit Program
- Public Utilities Commission
- State Board of Medical Examiners
- State Department of Administration
- State Department of Taxation
- State Library, Archives and Public Records
- State Office of Energy
- Agency for Nuclear Projects
- Railroad Commission
- Renewable Energy and Energy Efficiency Authority
- Commission on Mineral Resources
- Department of Wildlife

== Judiciary ==
Supreme Court of Nevada courthouse in Carson City.

Nevada's judiciary is composed of the Supreme Court of Nevada, the court of appeals, district courts, justices' courts, and municipal courts. Like most U.S. states, the legal system of Nevada is based on the precedent and customs of English common law and is codified in the Constitution of Nevada and Nevada Revised Statutes.

The common law of England, so far as it is not repugnant to or in conflict with the Constitution and laws of the United States, or the Constitution and laws of this State, shall be the rule of decision in all the courts of this State.

— Nevada Revised Statutes, NRS § 1.30

Supreme Court justices, appellate judges, district court judges, and justices of the peace are elected to six-year terms and may be impeached for misconduct. Vacancies are filled by appointment by the governor from candidates selected by the Commission on Judicial Selection.

=== Supreme court ===
Supreme Court of Nevada courthouse in Las Vegas.

The Supreme Court of Nevada oversees the judiciary and establishes the rules for procedure, practices, ethics, and professional conduct of judges and lawyers. The Court oversees the admissions of attorneys to the State Bar of Nevada and create the rules for conduct and provisions for discipline. Supreme Court Justices are empowered to create commissions and tasks forces to carry out the administration of justice and sit on the state board of pardons along side the governor and attorney general.

As the court of last resort, the Court must consider all appeals from the trial courts. En banc and panel sessions of the Court are held in Carson City and Las Vegas. Historically, the Court has also presided over sessions throughout the state, including in Elko, Ely, Fallon, North Las Vegas, Pahrump, Tonopah, Virginia City, Yerington, and Winnemucca.

=== Judicial townships and municipal courts ===
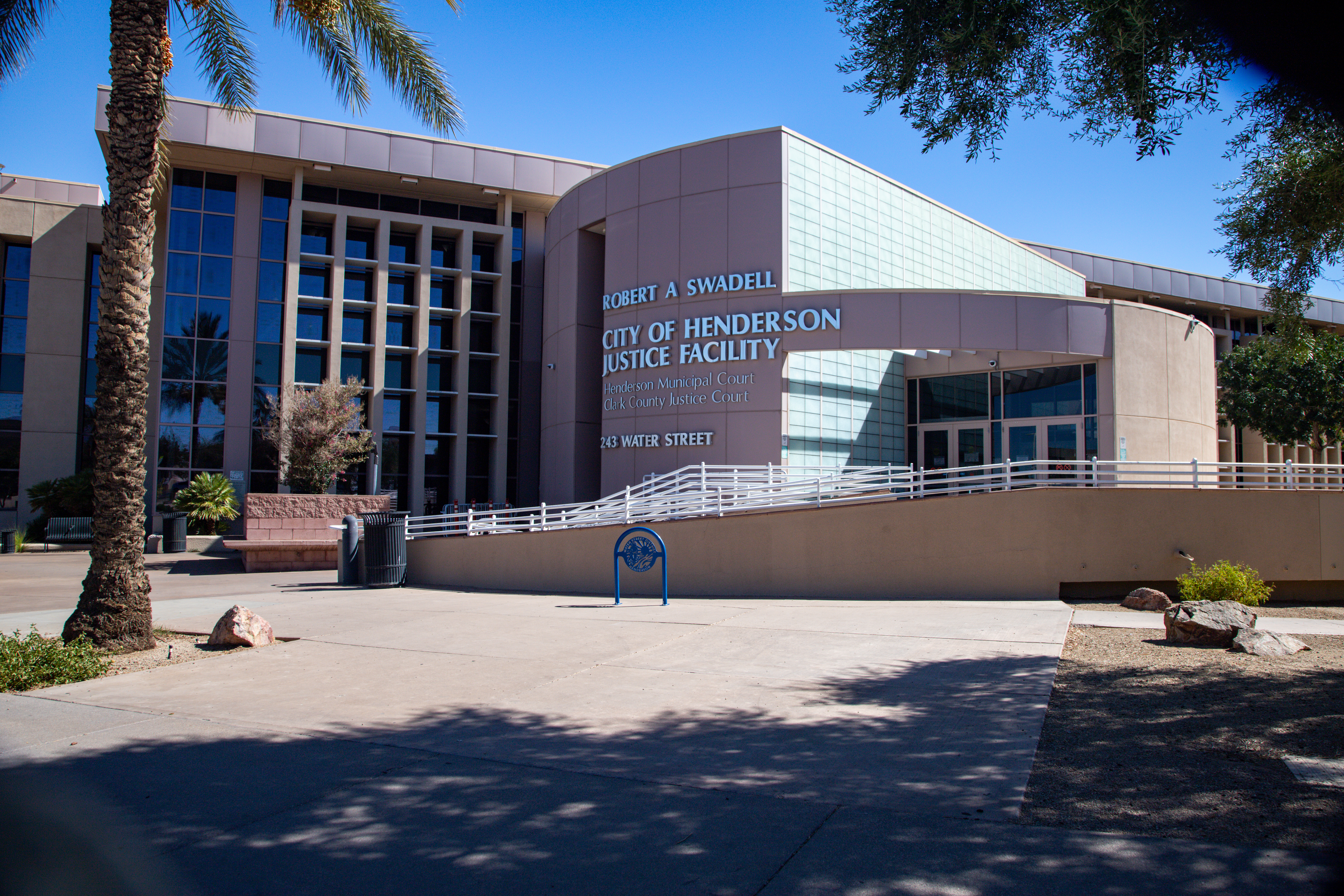
Henderson municipal court and justices' court for the Henderson township.

Justices' courts are courts of limited jurisdiction and are organized into judicial townships. Unlike townships in other states, the 43 townships in Nevada serve the sole function of providing administrative jurisdiction for justices' courts, so named because an elected justice of the peace presides over them. Justice's courts are courts of limited jurisdiction hearing only civil cases of less than $100,000, landlord-tenant disputes and lower-level criminal cases including misdemeanors, and preliminary hearings for felonies and gross misdeamenors.

Municipal courts in Nevada are courts of limited jurisdiction and serve the same function as justices' courts within the jurisdiction of an incorporated municipality.

== Local government ==
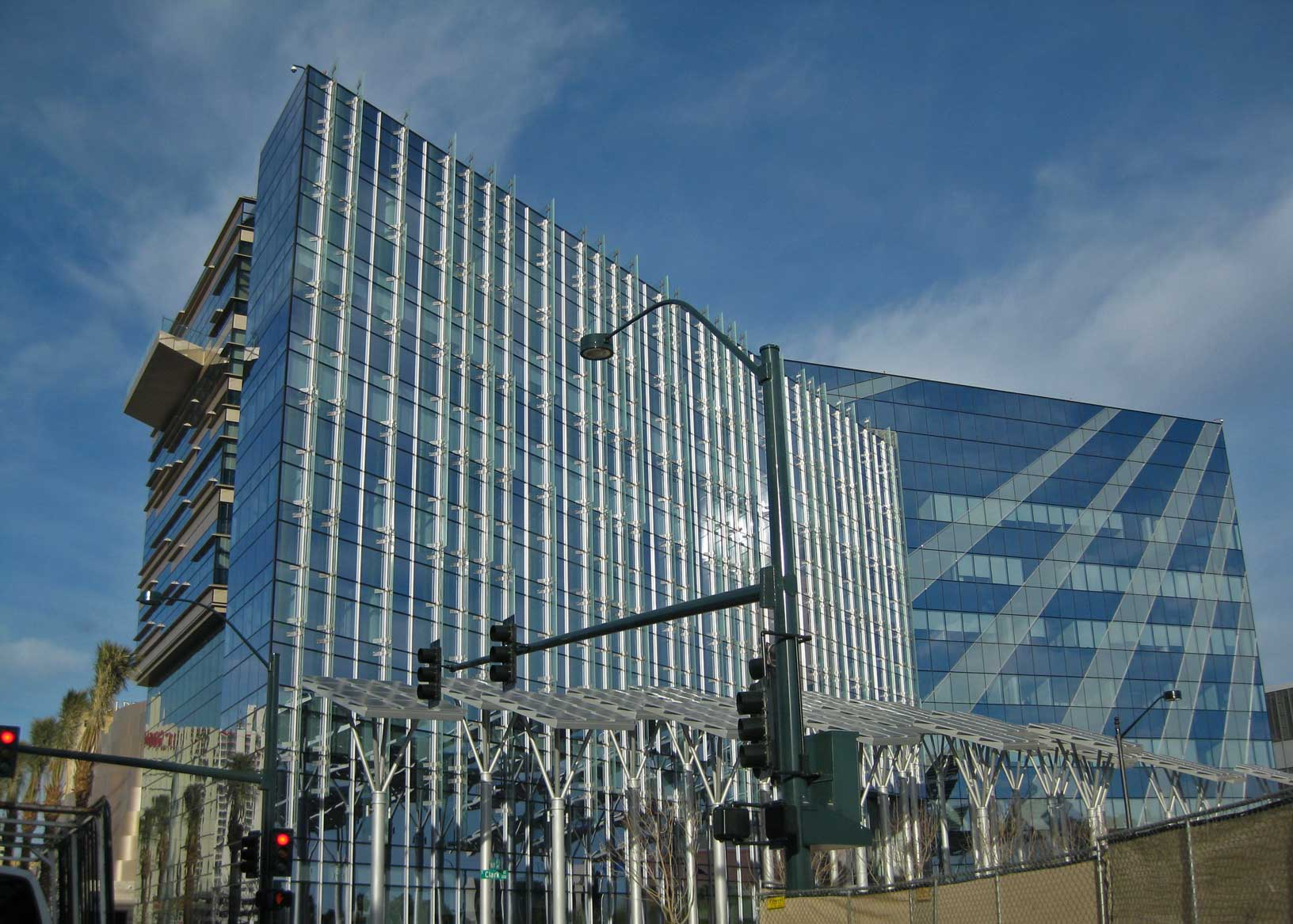
Las Vegas City Hall

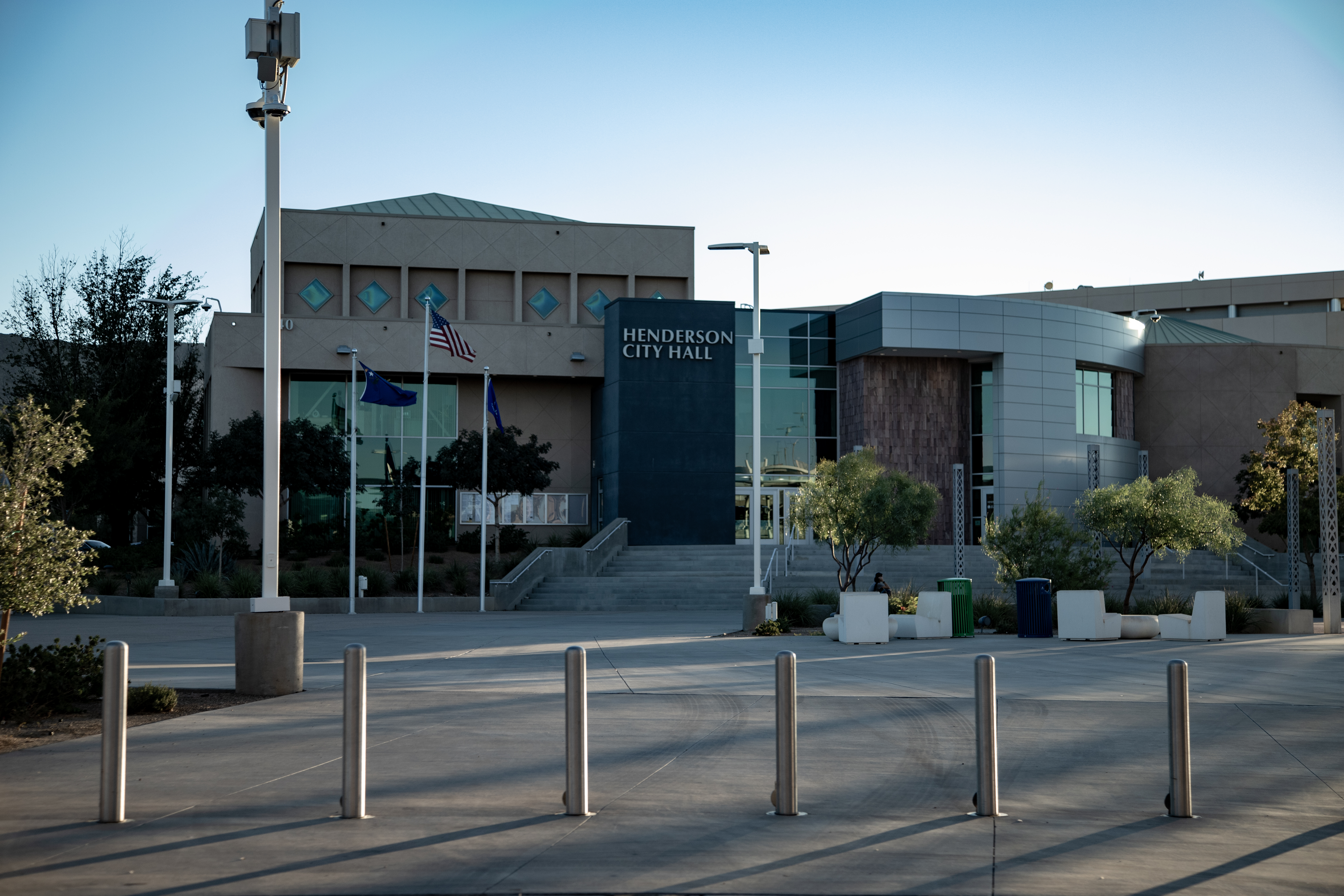
City hall of Henderson, the second largest city in Nevada.

Incorporated towns in Nevada, known as cities, are given the authority to legislate anything not prohibited by law. A recent movement has begun to permit home rule in incorporated Nevada cities to give them more flexibility and fewer restrictions from the legislature.

Unincorporated towns are settlements eminently governed by the county in which they are located, but who, by local referendum or by the act of the county commission, can form limited local governments in the form of a Town Advisory Board (TAB)/Citizens Advisory Council (CAC), or a Town Board.

Town Advisory Boards and Citizens Advisory Councils are formed purely by act of the county commission. Consisting of three to five members, these elected boards form a purely advisory role, and in no way diminish the responsibilities of the county commission that creates them. Members of advisory councils and boards are elected to two-year terms, and serve without compensation. The councils and boards, themselves, are provided no revenue, and oversee no budget.

Town Boards are limited local governments created by either the local county commission, or by referendum. The board consists of five members elected to four-year terms. Half the board is required to be up for election in each election. The board elects from within its ranks a town chairperson and town clerk. While more powerful than Town Advisory Boards and Citizens Advisory Councils, they also serve a largely advisory role, with their funding provided by their local county commission. The local county commission has the power to put before residents of the town a vote on whether to keep or dissolve a town board at any general election. Town boards have the ability to appoint a town manager if they choose to do so.

== See also ==
- Elections in Nevada
- History of Nevada
