= List of Nevada state agencies =

The following is a list of the U.S. state of Nevada's state agencies.

== Executive branch ==
=== Constitutional entities / officers ===
- Attorney General
  - Bureau of Consumer Protection (Consumer's Advocate)
  - Fraud Control Unit for Industrial Insurance
  - Fraud Control Unit for Insurance
  - Unit for the Investigation and Prosecution of Crimes Against Older Persons
  - Medicaid Fraud Control Unit
  - Office of Military Legal Assistance
  - Office of Ombudsman for Victims of Domestic Violence
  - Office of Advocate for Missing or Exploited Children (Children's Advocate)
  - Committee for the Statewide Alert System
  - Office of Statewide Coordinator for Children Who Are Endangered by Drug Exposure
  - Technological Crime Advisory Board
  - Gaming Division
  - Substance Abuse Working Group
  - Advisory Committee to Study Laws Concerning Sex Offender Registration
- Secretary of State
  - Advisory Committee on Participatory Democracy (inactive)
  - Commercial Recordings Division
  - Elections Division
  - Notary Division
  - Securities Division
- Governor
  - Office of Energy
    - Board of Directors of the Nevada Clean Energy Fund
    - New Energy Industry Task Force (inactive)
  - Office of Economic Development
    - Division of Motion Pictures
    - Division of Economic Development
    - Board of Economic Development
  - Office of Finance
    - Budget Division
      - Economic Forum
        - Technical Advisory Committee on Future State Revenues
      - Nevada Advisory Council on Federal Assistance
    - Division of Internal Audits
      - Executive Branch Audit Committee
  - Office of Science, Innovation and Technology
    - Advisory Council on Science, Technology, Engineering and Mathematics
  - Agency for Nuclear Projects
    - Commission on Nuclear Projects
    - Division of Technical Programs
    - Division of Planning
  - Office of the Western Regional Education Compact
  - Office of Workforce Innovation
  - Nevada Commission for Persons Who Are Deaf, Hard of Hearing or Speech Impaired
- Lieutenant Governor
- Controller
- Treasurer
  - Board of Trustees of the College Savings Plans of Nevada
- Nevada System of Higher Education
  - Board of Regents
    - Administrative Services
    - Community Colleges
    - State Colleges
    - Universities
    - Research Facilities
      - Desert Research Institute
      - Ethics Institute
      - Center for the Analysis of Crime Statistics
      - Office of the State Climatologist
    - Committee on Anatomical Dissection
    - Public Service Division
      - Agricultural Extension/Experiment Station
      - Bureau of Mines and Geology
    - State 4-H Camp Advisory Council
  - University of Nevada Cooperative Extension
- State Board of Examiners
- State Board of Finance

=== Agencies headed by directors appointed by the Governor ===
- Department of Administration
  - Administrative Services Division
  - Committee on Deferred Compensation for State Employees
  - Division of Enterprise Information Technology Services
    - Enterprise Application Services Unit
    - Communication and Computing Unit
    - Office of Information Security
    - Information Technology Advisory Board
  - Fleet Services Division
  - Office of Grant Procurement, Coordination and Management
  - Hearings Division
  - Division of Human Resource Management
    - Personnel Commission
    - Employee-Management Committee
    - Committee on Catastrophic Leave
    - Merit Award Board
  - Division of State Library, Archives and Public Records
    - Central Mailing Room
    - State Archives
    - State Publications Distribution Center
    - State Data Center
    - State Historical Records Advisory Board
    - Committee to Approve Schedules for the Retention and Disposition of Official State Records
    - State Council on Libraries and Literacy
  - State Public Works Division
    - State Public Works Board
    - Buildings and Grounds Section
    - Public Works–Compliance and Code Enforcement Section
    - Public Works–Professional Services Section
  - Purchasing Division
  - Risk Management Division
- State Department of Agriculture
  - State Board of Agriculture
  - Division of Consumer Equitability
  - Nevada Junior Livestock Show Board
  - Rangeland Resources Commission
  - State Predatory Animal and Rodent Committee
- Department of Business and Industry
  - Nevada Commission on Minority Affairs
    - Office of Ombudsman of Consumer Affairs for Minorities
  - Nevada Athletic Commission
  - Office of the Nevada Attorney for Injured Workers
  - Consumer Affairs Unit
  - Local Government Employee-Management Relations Board
  - Division of Financial Institutions
    - Credit Union Advisory Council
  - Housing Division
  - Division of Industrial Relations
    - Advisory Council
    - Board for the Administration of the Subsequent Injury Account for Associations of Self-Insured Public or Private Employers
    - Board for the Administration of the Subsequent Injury Account for Self-Insured Employers
    - Occupational Safety and Health Review Board
  - Division of Insurance
    - Appeals Panel for Industrial Insurance
  - Office of Labor Commissioner
    - State Apprenticeship Council
  - Division of Mortgage Lending
    - Advisory Council on Mortgage Investments and Mortgage Lending
  - Real Estate Division
    - Commission of Appraisers of Real Estate
    - Real Estate Commission
    - Office of the Ombudsman for Owners in Common-Interest Communities and Condominium Hotels
    - Commission for Common-Interest Communities and Condominium Hotels
  - Taxicab Authority
  - Nevada Transportation Authority
- State Department of Conservation and Natural Resources
  - State Conservation Commission
  - Division of Environmental Protection
    - State Environmental Commission
    - Board for Financing Water Projects
  - Division of Forestry
  - Office of Historic Preservation
    - Commission for Cultural Centers and Historic Preservation
    - Comstock Historic District Commission
  - Division of State Lands
    - State Land Office
      - Board of Review
    - State Land Use Planning Agency
    - Land Use Planning Advisory Council/Executive Council
  - Division of State Parks
  - Division of Water Resources
    - Office of the State Engineer
    - Well Drillers Advisory Board
    - Water Planning Section
  - Commission on Off-Highway Vehicles
  - Sagebrush Ecosystem Council
- Department of Employment, Training and Rehabilitation
  - Employment Security Division
    - Commission on Postsecondary Education
  - Employment Security Council/ Board of Review
  - Governor's Workforce Investment Board
  - Board for the Education and Counseling of Displaced Homemakers
  - Rehabilitation Division
    - Bureau of Services to Persons Who Are Blind or Visually Impaired
    - Bureau of Vocational Rehabilitation
    - Bureau of Disability Adjudication
  - Nevada Equal Rights Commission
  - Nevada State Rehabilitation Council
  - Nevada Committee of Blind Vendors
  - P-20W Research Data System Advisory Committee
- Department of Health and Human Services
  - Task Force on Alzheimer's Disease
  - Interagency Panel
  - Grants Management Advisory Committee
  - Advisory Committee on Problem Gambling
  - Board of Examiners for Long-Term Care Administrators
  - Office for Suicide Prevention
  - Committee to Review Suicide Fatalities
  - Early Intervention Interagency Coordinating Council
  - Office for Consumer Health Assistance
    - Bureau for Hospital Patients
    - Office of Minority Health and Equity
      - Advisory Committee on Minority Health and Equity
  - State of Nevada Advisory Council on Palliative Care and Quality of Life
  - Aging and Disability Services Division
    - Nevada Commission on Aging
    - Nevada Commission on Services for Persons with Disabilities
    - Office of the Community Advocate for Elder Rights
    - Office of Attorney for the Rights of Older Persons and Persons with a Physical Disability, an Intellectual Disability or a Related Condition
    - Office of the State Long-Term Care Ombudsman
  - Division of Child and Family Services
    - Youth Parole Bureau
    - Office of Juvenile Justice and Delinquency Prevention
    - Caliente Youth Center Bureau
    - Nevada Youth Training Center Bureau
    - State of Nevada Juvenile Justice Commission
    - Executive Committee to Review the Death of Children
    - Juvenile Justice Oversight Commission
      - Advisory Committee to the Juvenile Justice Oversight Commission
  - Division of Health Care Financing and Policy
    - Advisory Committee on Medicaid Innovation
    - Medical Care Advisory Committee
    - Pharmacy and Therapeutics Committee
    - Drug Use Review Board
  - Division of Public and Behavioral Health
    - Commission on Behavioral Health
    - State Board of Health
      - Advisory Committee on the State Program for Oral Health
    - Regional Behavioral Health Policy Boards
    - Committee on Emergency Medical Services
    - Medical Laboratory Advisory Committee
    - Advisory Board on Maternal and Child Health
    - Advisory Council on the State Program for Wellness and Prevention of Chronic Disease
  - Division of Social Services
    - Committee to Review Child Support Guidelines
  - Office of the State Public Defender
- Office of the Military
  - Nevada Air National Guard
  - Nevada Army National Guard
- Department of Motor Vehicles
  - Administrative Services Division
  - Division of Central Services and Records
  - Commission on Special License Plates
  - Division of Compliance Enforcement
    - Advisory Board on Automotive Affairs
  - Division of Field Services
  - Division of Information Technology
  - Division of the Office of the Director
  - Division of Management Services and Programs
  - Motor Carrier Division
- Department of Public Safety
  - State Board of Pardons Commissioners
  - Division of Parole and Probation
  - State Board of Parole Commissioners
  - Nevada State Council for Interstate Adult Offender Supervision
  - Nevada Office of Cyber Defense Coordination
  - Division of Emergency Management
    - Nevada Commission on Homeland Security
    - Intrastate Mutual Aid Committee
    - Board of Search and Rescue
    - Committee on Training in Search and Rescue
  - Records, Communication and Compliance Division
    - Advisory Committee on Nevada Criminal Justice Information Sharing
  - State Emergency Response Commission
  - State Fire Marshal Division
    - State Board of Fire Services
  - Training Division
  - Nevada Highway Patrol
  - Investigation Division
  - Capitol Police Division
  - Committee on Testing for Intoxication
  - Office of Criminal Justice Assistance
- Department of Tourism and Cultural Affairs
  - Division of Tourism
  - Commission on Tourism
  - Nevada Arts Council/Board
  - Division of Museums and History/Board
  - Nevada Indian Commission
- Department of Veterans Services
  - Nevada Veterans Services Commission
  - Advisory Committee for a Veterans Cemetery in Northern Nevada
  - Advisory Committee for a Veterans Cemetery in Southern Nevada
  - Interagency Council on Veterans Affairs
  - Women Veterans Advisory Committee

=== Agencies headed by boards or commissions ===
- Colorado River Commission of Nevada
- Department of Corrections
  - Board of State Prison Commissioners
  - Committee on Industrial Programs
- Department of Education
  - State Board of Education
  - Nevada Interscholastic Activities Association
  - Commission on Educational Technology
  - Council to Establish Academic Standards for Public Schools
  - Commission on Professional Standards in Education
    - Nevada Educator Code of Ethics Advisory Group
  - State Council for the Coordination of the Interstate Compact on Educational Opportunity for Military Children
  - Advisory Council on Parental Involvement and Family Engagement
  - Office of Parental Involvement and Family Engagement
  - State Public Charter School Authority
  - Office for a Safe and Respectful Learning Environment
  - Teachers and Leaders Council of Nevada
  - Statewide Council for the Coordination of the Regional Training Programs
  - Nevada Advisory Commission on Mentoring
  - Nevada Early Childhood Advisory Council
- State Gaming Control Board
  - Gaming Policy Committee
  - Gaming Commission
  - Off-Track Pari-Mutuel Wagering Committee
- Commission on Mineral Resources
  - Division of Minerals
- Board of the Public Employees Benefits Program
- Public Employees Retirement Board
  - Police and Firefighters Retirement Fund Advisory Committee
  - Public Employees Retirement System
  - Legislators Retirement System
  - Judicial Retirement System
- Public Utilities Commission of Nevada
  - Division of Consumer Complaint Resolution
- Department of Taxation
  - Nevada Tax Commission
  - Appraisers Certification Board
  - Office of the State Demographer
  - State Board of Equalization
  - Committee on Local Government Finance
  - Mining Oversight and Accountability Commission
- Department of Transportation
  - Board of Directors
  - Administrative Division
  - Operations Division
  - Engineering Division
  - Planning Division
  - Nevada State Infrastructure Bank
    - Board of Directors of the Nevada State Infrastructure Bank
  - Nevada Bicycle and Pedestrian Advisory Board
  - Advisory Committee on Transportational Storm Water Management
- Department of Wildlife
  - Board of Wildlife Commissioners
  - Advisory Board on Dream Tags

=== Independent boards, commissions, or councils ===
==== Policy and other boards and statutory bodies ====
- Commission on Ethics
- Governor's Advisory Council on Education Relating to the Holocaust
- Southern Nevada Enterprise Community Board
- Nevada State Board on Geographic Names
- State Grazing Boards
  - Central Committee of Nevada State Grazing Boards
- Nevada High-Speed Rail Authority
- Board of Trustees of the Fund for Hospital Care to Indigent Persons
- Board for the Regulation of Liquefied Petroleum Gas
- Advisory Council for Prosecuting Attorneys
- Nevada Tahoe Regional Planning Agency
- Silver State Health Insurance Exchange/Board
- Commission to Study Governmental Purchasing
- Nevada Commission for Women (inactive)
- Commission to Review the Compensation of Constitutional Officers, Legislators, Supreme Court Justices, Judges of the Court of Appeals, District Judges and Elected County Officers (inactive)

==== Professional and occupational licensing boards ====
- Nevada State Board of Accountancy
- Board of Examiners for Alcohol, Drug and Gambling Counselors
- State Board of Architecture, Interior Design and Residential Design
- Board of Athletic Trainers
- State Barbers' Health and Sanitation Board
- Board of Applied Behavior Analysis
- Chiropractic Physicians Board of Nevada
- State Contractors Board
- Commission on Construction Education
- State Board of Cosmetology
- Certified Court Reporters Board of Nevada
- Board of Dental Examiners of Nevada
  - Committee on Dental Hygiene
- State Board of Professional Engineers and Land Surveyors
- Nevada Funeral and Cemetery Services Board
- Board of Homeopathic Medical Examiners
- State Board of Landscape Architecture
- Board of Examiners for Marriage and Family Therapists and Clinical Professional Counselors
- Board of Massage Therapy
- Board of Medical Examiners
- State Board of Nursing
  - Advisory Committee on Nursing Assistants and Medication Aides
- Board of Occupational Therapy
- Board of Dispensing Opticians
- Nevada State Board of Optometry
- State Board of Oriental Medicine
- State Board of Osteopathic Medicine
- Peace Officers Standards and Training Commission
- State Board of Pharmacy
- Nevada Physical Therapy Board
- State Board of Podiatry
- Private Investigators Licensing Board
- Board of Psychological Examiners
- Board of Registered Environmental Health Specialists
- Board of Examiners for Social Workers
- Speech-Language Pathology, Audiology and Hearing Aid Dispensing Board
- Nevada State Board of Veterinary Medical Examiners

==== Interstate boards and commissions ====
- California-Nevada Interstate Compact Commission of the State of Nevada (inactive)
- California-Nevada Super Speed Ground Transportation Commission
- Education Commission of the States
  - Nevada State Council for Interstate Juvenile Supervision
- Interstate Medical Licensure Compact Commission
- Interstate Oil and Gas Compact Commission
- National Conference of Commissioners on Uniform State Laws
- Nevada State Council for Interstate Juvenile Supervision
- Tahoe Regional Planning Agency
  - Advisory Planning Commission
- Western Interstate Commission for Higher Education
- Western Interstate Nuclear Board
- Rocky Mountain Low-Level Radioactive Waste Board

== Legislative branch ==
- Senate
- Assembly
- Committees of the Legislature
- Legislative Counsel Bureau
  - Interim Finance Committee
  - Legislative Commission
  - Director's Office
    - Nevada Silver Haired Legislative Forum
    - Nevada Youth Legislature
  - Administrative Division
  - Audit Division
  - Fiscal Analysis Division
  - Legal Division
    - State Printing Office
  - Research Division
  - Advisory Commission on the Administration of Justice
    - Subcommittee on Criminal Justice Information Sharing
    - Subcommittee on Juvenile Justice
    - Subcommittee on Victims of Crime
    - Subcommittee to Review Arrestee DNA
    - Subcommittee on Medical Use of Marijuana
    - Nevada Sentencing Commission

== Judicial branch ==
- Commission on Judicial Selection
- Commission on Judicial Discipline
- Judicial Council of the State of Nevada
- Standing Committee on Judicial Ethics
- Court System
  - Supreme Court
    - Office of Court Administrator
    - State Guardianship Compliance Office
    - Supreme Court Law Library
  - Court of Appeals
  - District Courts
    - Family Courts
  - Justice Courts
  - Municipal Courts
