= Judiciary of Nevada =

U.S. state government branch

The Nevada Judiciary is the judicial branch of the Government of Nevada, which is responsible for applying the Constitution and law of Nevada. It consists of the Supreme Court, Court of Appeals, district courts, justice courts, and municipal courts. The Supreme Court oversees the administration of the judiciary.

== Courts ==
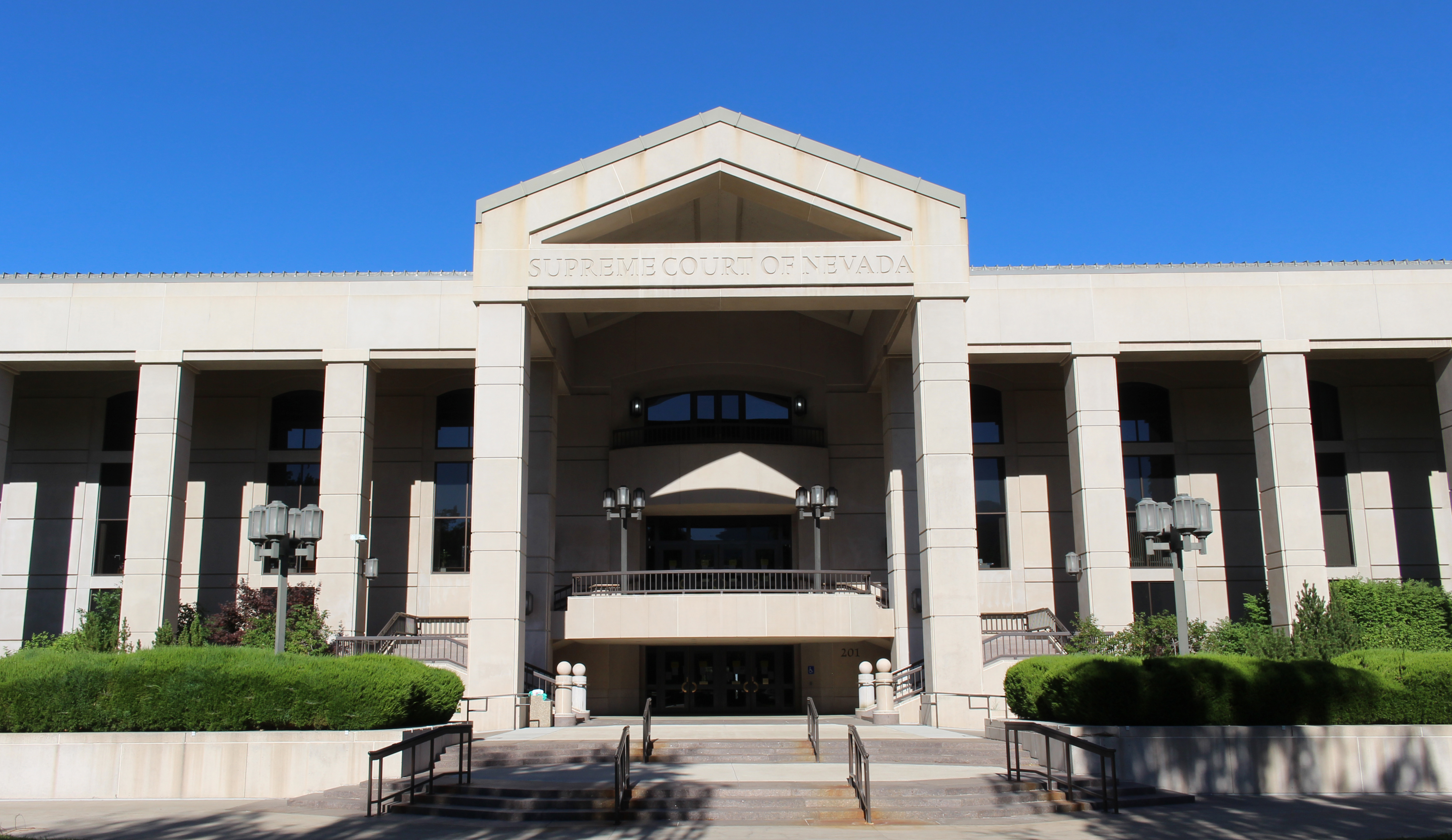
The Supreme Court building in Carson City, which also houses the Court of Appeals

=== Supreme Court ===
The Supreme Court of Nevada is the state supreme court, the state's highest appellate court. The Supreme Court consists of seven justices; the longest-serving member is the Chief Justice, and the rest are associate justices. Each justice is elected statewide for a six-year term.

The six associate justices are divided into two panels of three, with one based in Carson City and the other in Las Vegas. Most cases before the Court are heard and decided by one of the panels; cases with significant precedential or public policy implications are heard en banc by all seven justices.

=== Court of Appeals ===
The Court of Appeals is the state's intermediate appellate court. It consists of a chief judge and two associate judges. Each judge is elected statewide for a six-year term. The Court of Appeals follows a deflective, or "push-down", model, in which cases are assigned to it by the Supreme Court, rather than being received directly on appeal from the lower courts.

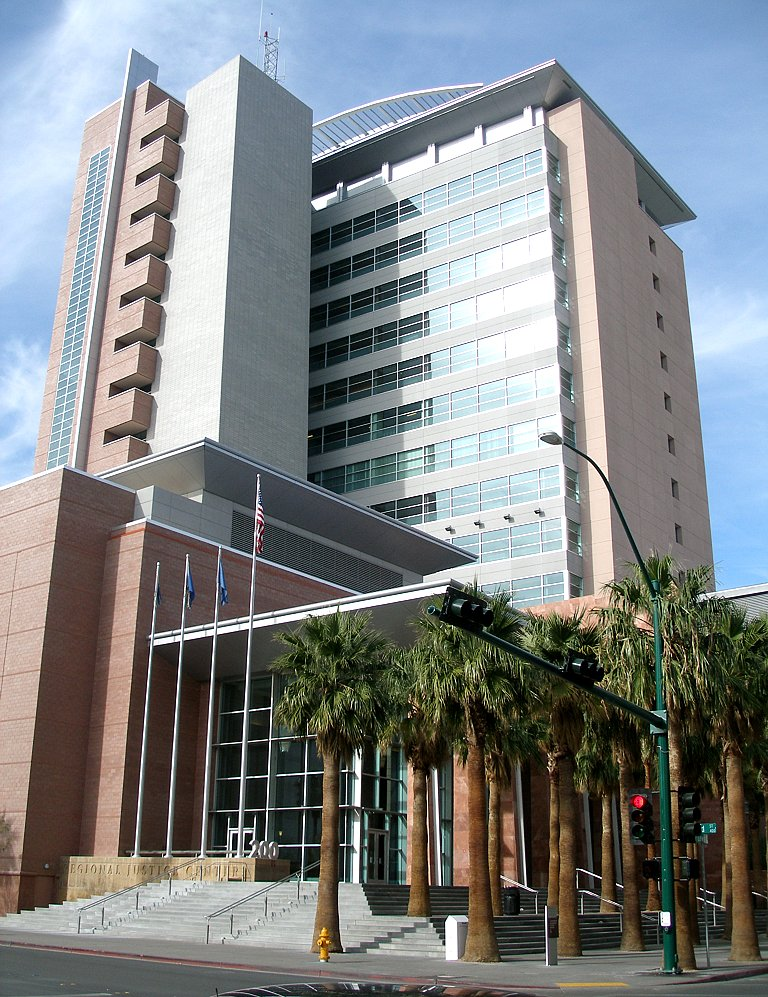
The Clark County Regional Justice Center, which is shared by the district, justice, and municipal courts serving Las Vegas

=== District courts ===
The district courts are Nevada's trial courts of general jurisdiction; they also serve as the appellate court for cases decided in the justice courts and municipal courts. The state is divided into eleven judicial districts, each of which comprises one to three of Nevada's sixteen counties and one independent city. Each district has a court, with a number of judges ranging from 1 to 52. Each judge is elected by a district-wide vote for a six-year term.

=== Justice courts ===
Each of Nevada's counties and its independent city are divided into one or more townships, and each township has a justice court. The justice courts are courts of limited jurisdiction that hear only minor cases; in general, they hear misdemeanor cases (including traffic tickets), (Note: In some cities, city law incorporates the state's criminal law. As a result, misdemeanors committed within the city may be tried in municipal court rather than justice court.) and civil cases involving $15,000 or less (including evictions and small claims cases). They may also hold probable cause hearings for felony and gross misdemeanor cases.

There are 40 justice courts in the state. Each justice court consists of a number of justices of the peace, as determined by a formula based on the township's population. Each justice of the peace is elected to a six-year term by voters in the township.

=== Municipal courts ===
Each incorporated city in Nevada has a municipal court. Like the justice courts, the municipal courts have limited jurisdiction; in general, they hear cases involving civil and misdemeanor violations of city ordinances, nuisance abatement cases, and cases involving $2,500 or less where the city is the plaintiff. The municipal court is presided over by a municipal judge (or, as provided by some city charters, multiple judges). Judges may be either elected by the city's voters, or appointed by the mayor with consent of the city council, as determined by city ordinance. The term of elected judges is set by the city charter or ordinances. In some cities, instead of electing or appointing a judge, the applicable justice of the peace serves ex officio as the municipal judge.

== Administration ==
The Chief Justice of the Supreme Court is the administrative head of the judiciary. The Supreme Court has rulemaking authority over the judicial system, under which it establishes rules for the administration of courts, rules of civil procedure, and rules of conduct for judges and attorneys. It also appoints a Court Administrator to manage the Administrative Office of the Courts, which provides support services for all of the courts in the state.

The Judicial Council of the State of Nevada exists to assist the Supreme Court in making policy. It consists of judges and court administrators from around the state. They are charged with researching issues and making recommendations for rules, policies, and proposed legislation. The Council includes five regional councils, which are responsible for studying local issues and coordinating the implementation of judiciary policies.

The Supreme Court oversees the State Bar of Nevada, which licenses and regulates attorneys in the state.

== Officers ==
=== Judicial officers ===
Judicial officers of all the state's courts are subject to oversight by the Commission on Judicial Discipline. The Commission consists of members appointed by the Supreme Court, the governor, and the governors of the State Bar. The commission can impose discipline up to and including removal from office, on grounds of willful misconduct, failure to perform the duties of the office, or habitual substance abuse. Judges and justices (except for justices of the peace) are also subject to impeachment by the Nevada Legislature. Unlike other state officers, they cannot be recalled.

If a seat becomes vacant on the Supreme Court, Court of Appeals, or district courts in the middle of a term, the governor appoints a replacement. The governor must choose from three nominees put forth by the Commission on Judicial Selection, which consists of a Supreme Court justice and members appointed by the governor and the governors of the State Bar. The replacement serves until the next general election. In case of a vacancy in a justice court, the county commissioners may either appoint a replacement or call a special election. Vacancies in municipal courts are handled according to city law.

State law allows various types of subordinate judicial officers to be appointed on a temporary or limited-scope basis, including special masters, referees, hearing commissioners, senior judges, and judges pro tem.

=== Prosecutors ===
Each county has an elected district attorney, who serves as the prosecutor of criminal cases in the county. The Nevada Attorney General has supervisory power over the district attorneys, but this power is rarely exercised. The Attorney General's office also handles prosecutions in areas such as insurance fraud and elder exploitation, and can prosecute other state crimes as needed. Within incorporated cities, the city attorney may be responsible for prosecuting misdemeanors.

=== Public defenders ===
Each county and city is required to ensure the right to counsel by providing an attorney for any indigent criminal defendant who is facing a possible jail sentence. Most counties have met this requirement by establishing a public defender office, which either employs attorneys or contracts with private attorneys. The State Public Defender's Office, a unit of the Department of Health and Human Services, provides indigent defense for those counties that do not have their own public defender office. As of 2018, only Carson City and Storey County use the State Public Defender. In municipal courts, cities either rely on the county's public defender office or contract with private defense attorneys.

=== Peace officers ===
The county sheriff is responsible for maintaining order in the district court, as well as serving and executing process and writs from the district and justice courts. District judges and justices of the peace may also appoint bailiffs or deputy marshals to ensure courtroom security. Some municipal courts also employ bailiffs or marshals.

The constable is a township officer whose duties relate mainly to the justice court, including service of summonses and subpoenas, enforcement of evictions, and summoning of juries. The constable is generally elected by township voters to a four-year term, but the county commissioners may instead decide that the county sheriff shall serve ex officio as the constable, or may abolish the office of constable entirely.

== Caseload ==
In fiscal year 2017, a total of 807,576 cases were filed in Nevada's lower courts, broken down as follows:

Court Type	Case Type					Total
Court Type	Criminal (non-traffic)	Civil	Family	Juvenile	Traffic & Parking	Total
District	18,011	28,061	85,749	10,078	2,315	144,214
Justice	80,454	113,736			297,171	491,361
Municipal	46,249	3,859			121,893	172,001
Total	144,714	145,656	85,749	10,078	421,379	807,576

In the same period, 2,785 cases were filed with the Supreme Court, and 971 were assigned to the Court of Appeals.
