= Nevada Office of Economic Development =

Nevada State Agency

The Nevada Office of Economic Development or the Nevada Government's Office of Economic Development (GOED) is a Nevada state agency that was created to establish a cohesive economic development strategy and create sustainable job opportunities for Nevada residents.

The agency is led by a board that consists of the Nevada governor, lieutenant governor, secretary of state, several business founders and CEOs, as well as several state agency heads, most notably the Director of the Department of Business and Industry and the Director of the Department of Employment, Training and Rehabilitation. The GOED is headquartered in Carson City, Nevada.

== History ==
The current structure of the GOED was created in 2011, and consists of two divisions: an Economic Development Division and a Motion Pictures Division (also known as the Nevada Film Office). Prior to that the GOED was known as the commission of economic development, which came to replace the department of economic development in 1983.

== Programs ==
It currently manages the following programs and incentives:

1. Business Development & Assistance Programs
2. Workforce Development Programs
3. Innovations Based Economic Development Programs
4. International Trade Programs
5. Rural Community & Economic Development Programs
6. Procurement Assistance & Outreach (PTAC)
7. Nevada Film Office Tax Incentives
8. Emerging Small Business Program (ESB)

== See also ==
- Economy of the United States
- United States Department of Commerce
