= Nevada Renewable Energy and Energy Efficiency Authority =

Eliminated U.S. state government agency

The Nevada Renewable Energy and Energy Efficiency Authority was a state government agency in Nevada charged with promoting energy conservation and use of renewable energy sources. Its administrator held the title of Nevada Energy Commissioner.

The Authority was created by the state legislature in 2009. The Authority was eliminated in 2011, and its responsibilities were transferred to the State Office of Energy.

== Commissioners ==
In 2009 Governor Jim Gibbons appointed the first Energy Commissioner, Hatice Gecol.
