= Nevada State Department of Taxation =

State agency in Nevada, United States

The Nevada State Department of Taxation is a Nevada government state agency that mainly focuses on the collection and distribution of taxes in Nevada. Aside from its taxation-related duties, the agency also manages and regulates marijuana business licensing and property appraisals. The agency is headquartered in Carson City, and also operates offices in Reno, Las Vegas, and Henderson.

== History ==
The department has been in operations since 1917, when the Nevada Tax Commission was established. It was only in 1975 that the Department of Taxation was created and the commission became part of its ruling body, serving as the head of the department. The members of the commission are always chosen by the governors, and as of 2021, consists of eight members.

== Structure ==
Unlike most state agencies, the Department of Taxation does not have any divisions, though there are several boards and commissions that have remained active since 1917, such as the Nevada Tax Commission and the State Board of Equalization. Aside from the two, three other groups existed, namely the Mining Oversight and Accountability Commission, Appraiser Certification Board, and Committee on Local Government Finance.

== See also ==
- Internal Revenue Service
- List of Nevada state agencies
- Taxation in the United States
