= Nevada State Department of Administration =

State agency in Nevada, United States

The Nevada State Department of Administration is a department of the Nevada state government tasked to manage and support internal operations of the Nevada state agencies. In addition to providing administrative support for the agencies, the department also oversees the Nevada State Library, Archives, and Public Records and administrative hearings and appeals. The department is headquartered in Carson City, Nevada.

== Divisions ==
The Department of Administration has twelve divisions [3]:

1. Administrative Services: Offers fiscal and administrative support to all divisions in the Department of Administration as well as other state agencies, offices, boards, and commissions.
2. Enterprise IT Services: Offers IT services and support to other Nevada state agencies.
3. Fleet Services: Provides transportation solutions to Nevada state employees.
4. Office of Grant Procurement, Coordination, and Management: Manages the state's performance in the federal, corporate, and private grant areas.
5. Hearings: Manages dispute resolution hearings.
6. Human Resources Management: Focuses on providing human resource services for employees of the state.
7. Mail Services: Manages mail services for local and state governments in the Carson City, Reno, and Las Vegas areas.
8. Nevada Deferred Compensation: Manages the Nevada Deferred Compensation Program for state and local government employees.
9. Purchasing: Manages procurement processes on behalf of the State of Nevada.
10. Risk Management: Preserves and protects state employees and properties.
11. Nevada State Library, Archives, and Public Records: Manages the library, archives, and records management programs.
12. State Public Works: Manages and implements state capital improvements and state facilities.

== See also ==
- Bureau of Administration
