= Nevada District Courts =

U.S. state trial courts

In the Nevada state court system, the Nevada District Courts are the trial courts of general jurisdiction, where criminal, civil, family, and juvenile matters are generally resolved through arbitration, mediation, and bench or jury trials.

There are business court programs in two Nevada District Courts, the Eighth Judicial District in Law Vegas, and the Second Judicial District in Reno. Brent T. Adams was the first business court judge in Reno.

The District Courts also hear appeals from the limited jurisdiction state courts, which are composed of 17 Municipal Courts (which handle involving traffic ticket and misdemeanor violations of ordinances occurring within the city limits of incorporated municipalities) and 45 Justice Courts (which handle misdemeanor crime and traffic matters, small claims, evictions, and other civil matters in which the amount in controversy is less than $10,000, as well as felony and gross misdemeanor arraignments and preliminary hearings to determine if sufficient evidence exists for a trial in the District Court).

Appeals from the Nevada District Courts are taken directly by the Supreme Court of Nevada. Following a deflective model of appeals, the Supreme Court of Nevada has discretion to assign cases to the three-member Court of Appeals. It is expected that most cases will be finally resolved by the Court of Appeals, from which further appeal will be heard by the Supreme Court of Nevada only in extraordinary cases.

There are 82 judges sitting in 11 district courts, each covering one or more of Nevada's 16 counties and one independent city:

- First Judicial District – Carson City (independent city) and Storey County. 2 judges.
- Second Judicial District – Washoe County. 15 judges (6 family court, 9 civil/criminal court).
- Third Judicial District – Lyon County. 2 judges.
- Fourth Judicial District – Elko County. 3 judges.
- Fifth Judicial District – Esmeralda County and Nye County. 2 judges.
- Sixth Judicial District – Humboldt County. 1 judge.
- Seventh Judicial District – Eureka County, Lincoln County, and White Pine County. 2 judges.
- Eighth Judicial District – Clark County (serves the Las Vegas metropolitan area and is the largest of the judicial districts). 52 judges (20 family court, 32 civil/criminal court).
- Ninth Judicial District – Douglas County. 2 judges.
- Tenth Judicial District – Churchill County. 1 judge.
- Eleventh Judicial District - Pershing County, Lander County, and Mineral County. 1 judge.
