= Nevada Public Employees' Benefit Program =

U.S. state agency

The Nevada Public Employees’ Benefit Program, also known as PEBP, is a Nevada state agency that manages and administers the health and life insurance programs for qualified employees of the Nevada government. The agency is currently headed by an executive officer, who reports to the PEBP board. The current executive officer is unlisted. The Nevada Public Employees' Benefit Program is headquartered in Carson City, Nevada.

== History ==
The PEBP first started in 1963 as a committee elected to manage the public employees’ group insurance and social security. There were only seven members on the board of committee, though its member composition is fairly similar to the currently existing structure. The number of members decreased even further in 1967, with only five members remaining. It was only in 1999 that the membership was expanded to nine board members, and by 2013 the current board's structure was created.

== Structure ==
The PEBP consists of a PEBP board that oversees the entire operation of the PEBP and the executive officer as the highest-ranking staff of the agency. There are ten members that make up the board of the PEBP.

== See also ==
- Federal Employees Health Benefits Program
- Health insurance in the United States
