= Nevada Legislative Counsel Bureau =

State agency in Nevada, United States

Agency overview
- Formed: 1945
- Jurisdiction: Nevada Legislature
- Agency executive: Asher Killian, Director
- Parent department: Nevada Legislature
- Website: Official website

The Nevada Legislative Counsel Bureau is a state agency within the Nevada Legislature responsible for legal research, legislative and financial impact studies on proposed legislation, and historical and background research.

With offices at the state capitol in Carson City and Las Vegas, the bureau operates under the direction of the Nevada Legislative Commission, a twelve-member body composed of legislators from both the Nevada Assembly and Senate and both parties. With the legislature being biennial, or every two years, the commission meets during interim sessions and oversees the work of the bureau, including approval of special audits and research studies.

As of July 2026, the bureau's director is Asher Killian who was selected to lead the bureau by its governing commission. Previously, he served in the bureau as the deputy legislative counsel and chief deputy legislative counsel.

== History ==
The Legislative Counsel Bureau was established in 1945 and codified in Nevada Revised Statutes to provide centralized, nonpartisan services to the Nevada Legislature. The bureau was placed under the supervision of the Legislative Commission, a bipartisan body created to function between sessions. The commission continues to govern the bureau and appoints its director, known as the Legislative Counsel.

Since, the bureau expanded to include five major divisions: legal, audit, fiscal analysis, research, and administration. By the 1970s these divisions had become the primary staff support system for the legislature, providing bill drafting, audits of executive agencies, budgetary analysis, and policy research.

Since 1910, Nevada’s political and historical record has been maintained through the Political History of Nevada, a reference work produced by the Nevada secretary of state in collaboration with the bureau's research division. The publication has been updated regularly, with the twelfth edition released in 2018.

In December 2019, Brenda Erdoes, who had served as Nevada’s Legislative Counsel since 1993, was appointed director of the bureau, becoming the first woman to hold the position. After 40 years at the bureau, she retired in 2024.

== Structure and operations ==
The bureau is organized into five divisions: administrative, audit, fiscal analysis, legal, and research. Each division is directed by an administrator appointed by the Legislative Commission. The Legislative Counsel serves as the bureau’s executive head, overseeing day-to-day operations and providing legal advice to the legislature.

- The administrative division manages personnel, information technology, facilities, and other support services.
- The audit division conducts performance and financial audits of executive branch agencies, local governments, and programs, and may subpoena witnesses or documents when authorized by statute.
- The fiscal analysis division prepares revenue forecasts, analyzes the governor’s proposed budget, produces fiscal notes on legislation, and staffs the interim finance committee.
- The legal division drafts bills and resolutions, provides legal opinions, reviews administrative regulations, and represents the legislature in litigation.
- The research division conducts policy studies, prepares background reports, compiles legislative histories, and staffs interim study committees. It also manages the Legislative Counsel Bureau Library and produces publications such as the Political History of Nevada.

=== Functions during and between sessions ===
During legislative sessions, the bureau provides bill drafting services, committee staffing, floor support, and the preparation of legal opinions at the request of legislators. Staff from the bureau assist in analyzing amendments, preparing fiscal notes, and ensuring compliance with statutory requirements.

Between sessions, the bureau continues to provide services to interim committees, which are authorized to conduct oversight and policy studies. The audit and fiscal analysis divisions monitor compliance with audit recommendations and provide budgetary analyses for the interim finance committee. The research division staffs study committees and produces policy reports, while the legal division issues formal opinions and reviews administrative regulations.

== Oversight and staffing ==
The bureau is governed and overseen by a legislative body, and its day-to-day operations are carried out by nonpartisan professional staff.

=== Nevada Legislative Commission ===
The bureau is supervised by the Nevada Legislative Commission, a twelve-member body composed of legislators from both chambers of the state legislature. Each regular legislative session, the Nevada Assembly and Nevada Senate each designate six members (plus alternates) to serve on the commission. The commission has general policymaking and supervisory authority over the bureau, including approval of audits, directing studies, and setting priorities between sessions. The bureau's director acts as the nonvoting recording secretary of the commission.

Members of the commission receive the legislative daily salary (when engaged in bureau business or attending meetings) plus per diem and travel allowances; alternates attending without replacing a regular member receive travel but not salary. A quorum is seven members.

=== Staff and nonpartisanship ===
The bureau employs a professional, nonpartisan staff. As of 2018, the bureau has approximately 300 permanent staff, with additional temporary staff hired during legislative sessions. It is prohibited for bureau staff to engage in lobbying, campaign or political activities, or display political advocacy material.

Within the legal division, for example, the position of deputy legislative counsel handles drafting, legal research and amending the Nevada Revised Statutes and Nevada Administrative Code with passed legislation and litigation support. Staff are assigned to divisions and headed by directors or division administrators. The bureau's director is appointed by the Legislative Commission.

Some audit and fiscal work is overseen by legislative subcommittees. For instance, the audit division works with a Legislative Commission audit subcommittee, composed of legislators, which approves audit agendas and special audits.

== Criticism ==
In 2025, the Nevada Independent reported that the bureau implemented a policy withholding many hearing exhibits from online publication, claiming copyright constraints. The bureau acknowledged an “undeniably large number of exhibits” were unavailable online. Under the policy, interested parties often had to contact the legislative library to request digital copies. The policy has drawn criticism for reducing public access to materials that were previously posted. The same reporting noted that bureau officials said the policy aimed to avoid violating copyright law, citing two recent claims in the current biennium.

Reporting by The Nevada Independent point out that the legislature, through laws and practices, is largely exempt from the state’s open meeting and public records statutes, limiting public oversight of legislative staff and internal operations. A paper from the Brookings Institution on legislative transparency characterized the legislature and bureau's exemptions and lack of openness as part of broader lack of accountability in the legislature. The Las Vegas Review-Journal has criticized the bureau and legislature for having broad legislative exemptions from open-records laws, and selective withholding of materials, reduce transparency and public accountability.

In 2024, the Review-Journal editorial board accused the bureau of supplying “questionable legal advice” to Assemblywoman Michelle Gorelow. In that case, the bureau asserted she need not abstain or disclose a conflict when funding a nonprofit that later hired her, reasoning that the measure “affects most citizens in the state.” The editorial contended that under such reasoning, “bad legal advice would get most lawyers fired.” In the ethics investigation, a Nevada Commission on Ethics review panel ultimately found insufficient evidence to impose sanctions, and was barred from investigating the legislator’s vote under separation-of-powers constraints. The panel did not evaluate the bureau’s advice itself, only the legislator’s conduct. The newspaper reporting noted that the panel unanimously concluded there was no evidence that Gorelow’s actions improperly influenced her public duties or misused state resources.

== See also ==
- Nevada Assembly
- Nevada Senate
- Nevada Legislature
- Government of Nevada
- Nevada Revised Statutes
