= Nevada Department of Health and Human Services =

State agency of Nevada

The Nevada Department of Health and Human Services (DHHS) is a state agency of Nevada, headquartered in Suite 100 of the 4126 Technology Way building in Carson City. The agency provides health services and human services.

== History ==
The department started operating in 1963, and was originally known as the Department of Health and Welfare. The department had seven divisions dedicated to alcoholism, children's home, health, girls training center, state hospital, youth training center, and welfare. By 1967, however, the department was already referred as the Department of Health, Welfare, and Rehabilitation, and three more divisions were introduced to focus on assist Nevada citizens in regards to mental health, rehabilitation, and services for the visually impaired. In 1973, an aging services division was established, which was previously a part of the welfare division, bringing the total number of active divisions to ten.

However, by 1983, the department ceased to exist and its divisions were integrated into the Department of Human Resources. Only six divisions remained: aging services, health, mental hygiene and mental retardation, rehabilitation, state welfare, and youth services. The health department was only reestablished in 2011, under the name that it is currently recognized as.

== Divisions ==
The department currently supervises six divisions:

1. Aging and Disability Services Division (ADSD)
2. Division of Child and Family Services (DCFS)
3. Division of Health Care Financing and Policy (DHCFP)
4. Division of Public and Behavioral Health (DPBH)
5. Division of Welfare and Supportive Services (DWSS)

== See also ==
- List of Nevada state agencies
- United States Department of Health and Human Services
