= The State of Nevada Commission on Mineral Resources =

State agency in Nevada, United States

The State of Nevada Commission on Mineral Resources, also known as the Nevada Division of Minerals, is a Nevada state agency division that focuses on regulating geothermal drilling activities in Nevada, whether conducted in private or public lands. The division is currently headed by a chairman, and the position is currently occupied by Josh Nordquist. It is headquartered in Carson City and maintains an additional office in Las Vegas.

== History ==
The commission and division have been in existence since 1977, though the commission was originally called the Nevada Oil and Gas Conservation Commission. The division, however, was already known as the Division of Mineral Resource and functions as part of the Nevada State Department of Conservation and Natural Resources. In 1983, however, the commission was replaced by the Oil, Gas, and Mining Board and remained this way until 1993, when the commission was replaced by the Commission on Mineral Resources. The commission consists of seven members.

== Programs ==
The Division of Minerals focuses on operating the following programs:

1. Abandoned Mine Lands (AML)
2. Bond Pool (Reclamation)
3. Dissolved Mineral Resource Exploration (DRME)
4. Education & Outreach
5. Geothermal
6. Mining
7. Oil & Gas

== See also ==
- Mining in the United States
- Gold mining in Nevada
- Silver mining in Nevada
- United States Department of Energy
