= Nevada Film Office =

U.S. state government agency

The Nevada Film Office is a Nevada state agency that promotes Nevada as a location of choice for film, entertainment, television, and multimedia production. The agency also maintains several open directories for film locations and production crews in Nevada, and offers services to connect with resources that production companies need while filming in Nevada. Since 2014, it also administers several tax credit incentives for companies that film in Nevada.

The Nevada Film Office is part of the Governor's Office of Economic Development and is headquartered in Las Vegas, Nevada.

== History ==
Originally, the Nevada Film Office was known as the Division of Motion Pictures, and was established in 1983 as part of the commission on economic development (now known as the Governor's Office of Economic Development), where it has remained ever since. Although it is known as the Nevada Film Office in the media, most legal documents still uses the Division of Motion Pictures to refer to the agency.

== See also ==
- Film commission
- Film industry
- Movie production incentives in the United States
- List of Nevada State agencies
- List of films shot in Las Vegas
