= Nevada Indian Commission =

U.S. state government agency

The Nevada Indian Commission is a Nevada state agency division that studies matters affecting the social and economic welfare and well-being of American Indians residing in Nevada. The division is part of the Department of Tourism and Cultural Affairs. It is led by an executive director, and the position is currently occupied by Stacey Montooth, who reports to both the commissioner and the governor. The division is headquartered in Carson City, Nevada.

== History ==
The Nevada Indian Commission has existed since 1965, and is meant to be composed of seven members, including the commissioner, with at least three American Indian members. It was originally called the Indian Affairs Commission until 1973, when it was renamed into the current commission. It was also during that year that the number of board members was reduced to five, with only two members allowed to be of non-Native American descent. This board of commission composition remains to this date. The commission is appointed by the governor, and the members are meant to hold the position for three years.

== Programs ==
Aside from managing several programs for American Indians, the commission also operates and oversees the Stewart Indian School Museum. There are also two active committees that are working with the commission: The Stewart Advisory Committee and the Indian Education Advisory Committee.

== See also ==
- Bureau of Indian Affairs
- Indigenous peoples of the Americas
- Native Americans in the United States
