= Nevada Department of Education =

U.S. state education agency

Agency overview
- Formed: 1865/1956
- Jurisdiction: Nevada
- Headquarters: 700 E. Fifth St. Carson City; 2080 E. Flamingo Rd. Las Vegas
- Employees: 170
- Annual budget: $8,691,811,447 USD (FY 2025)
- Agency executives: Victor Wakefield, Superintendent of Public Instruction; Christy McGill, Deputy Superintendent; Megan Peterson, Deputy Superintendent; Ann Marie Dickson, Deputy Superintendent
- Parent department: Nevada State Board of Education, State Superintendent of Public Instruction, the Governor
- Website: Official website

The Nevada Department of Education (NDOE) is a semi-independent state education agency responsible for public education for the U.S. state of Nevada. It is composed of the Nevada State Board of Education, the State Board for Career and Technical Education, and the Nevada superintendent of public instruction. It is responsible for administering and setting education policies, ensuring local compliance for federally-funded education programs such as Title I and IDEA, and assists local school districts. Since 1968, higher education in Nevada has been governed by the separate Nevada System of Higher Education.

Appointed by the governor under the executive branch, the superintendent of public instruction serves as the department’s executive officer and secretary to the board, responsible for enforcing education laws and supervising K–12 education statewide. The partially-elected board determines the policy priorities, student outcome goals, assessments, as well as approving and reviewing data. When there is a vacancy in the superintendent position, the board creates a short list of candidates from which the governor may choose.

Before the 1956 reorganization of Nevada's K–12 education system, the department existed but was not explicitly created by law. Several laws refer had referred to it, but no law ever created it until the 8th Special Session of the Nevada Legislature. Similar to most Nevada state agencies, NDOE is headquartered at the capital, Carson City, but maintains a significant presence in Las Vegas.

Charter schools are regulated under the Nevada State Public Charter School Authority, as well as each of the 17 county and independent city-based public school districts in the state. The largest, the Clark County School District, serves over 300,000 students and is the fifth largest school district in the United States behind New York City, LA Unified, Chicago, and Miami-Dade.

Together with the Nevada State Police, the department launched the SafeVoice in 2018, a mobile app and telephone hotline for anonymous reports of actual or suspected abuse, self-harm, bullying, and violent behavior. Anyone can submit reports which are immediately received by Nevada State Police.

== History ==
=== Beginning to 1956 reorganization ===
Organized public education in Nevada predates statehood. In 1861, the legislature of the Nevada Territory created a framework for schools, including a school board composed of the territorial-equivalents of the superintendent (as president), the auditor (secretary), and treasurer. Early duties of this board focused on managing a school fund and selecting textbooks.

In 1864, the Nevada Constitution established a state-wide elected office of superintendent of public instruction. The superintendent was elected to two-year, later four-year, terms to lead the state's public education. Additionally, the state board of education was also established, originally including the governor, the state superintendent, and the Nevada surveyor-general. In 1895, the legislature passed law replacing the state surveyor general with the president of the state university.

Although references to a "department" of education appeared during this era, it did not exist formally as an agency until reorganization in 1956.

=== 1956 education reorganization ===
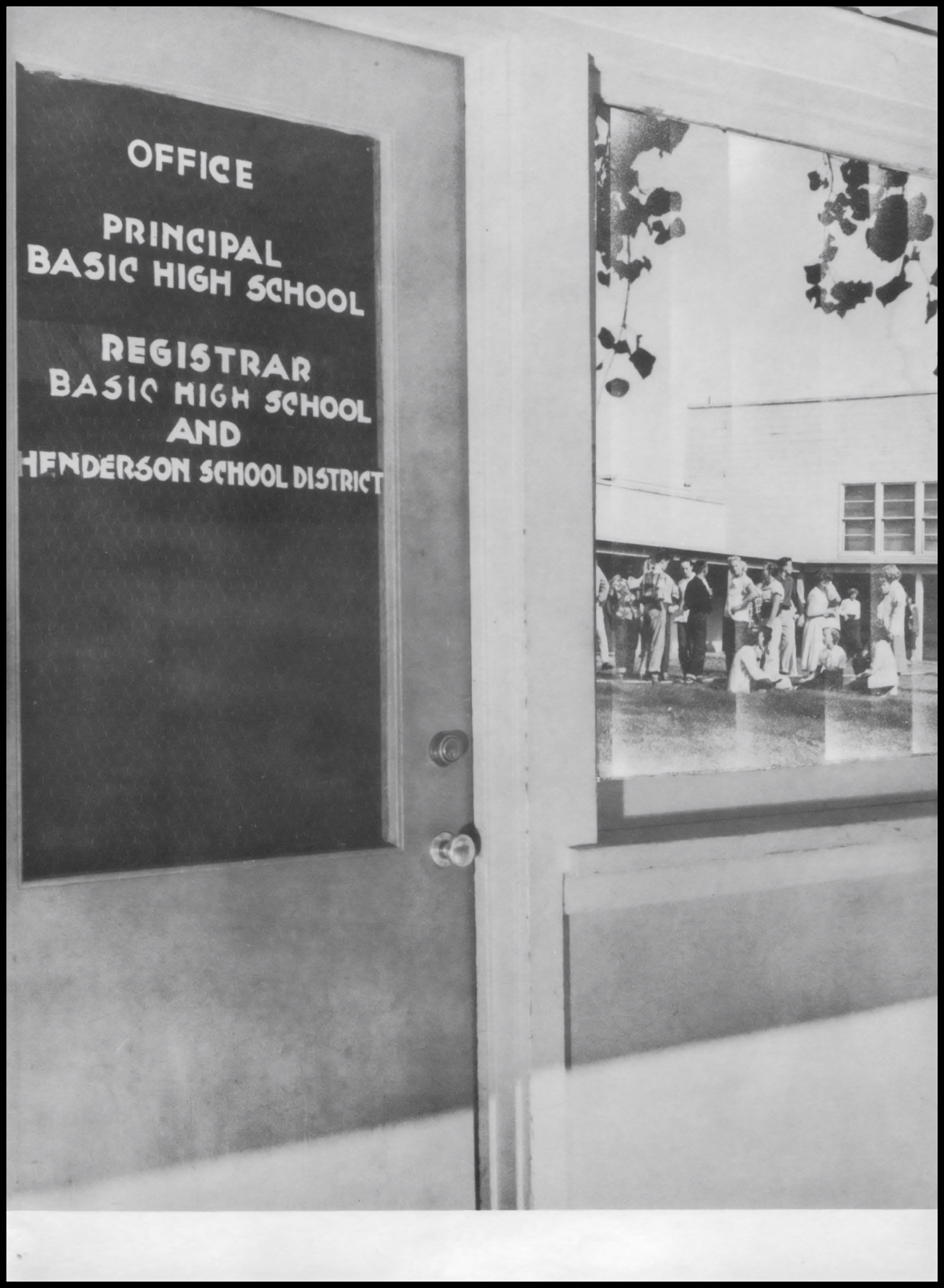
Prior to the 1956 reorganization, cities such as Henderson often had their own school districts with some areas having single-site school districts.

In 1956, as national trend in favor of school district unification and consolidation, a special session of the Nevada Legislature was convened to pass several education bills. One of the bills, Assembly Bill 1, closed the statutory gap legitimizing the existence of the department which had never officially been created. Also, the special session created all of all of the state's 17 school districts, 16 county-based districts and one for independent Carson City.

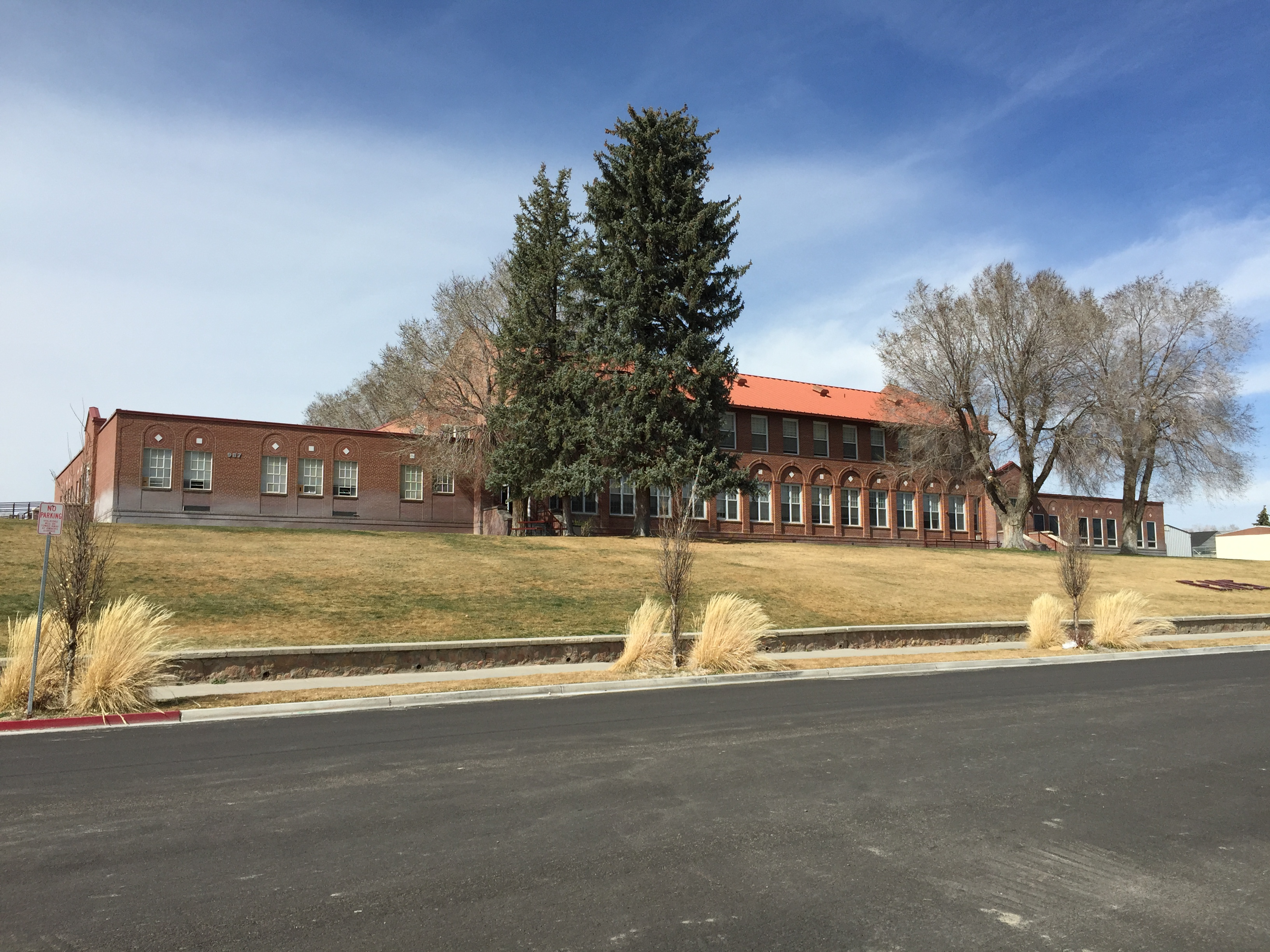
Elko High School in the Elko County School District

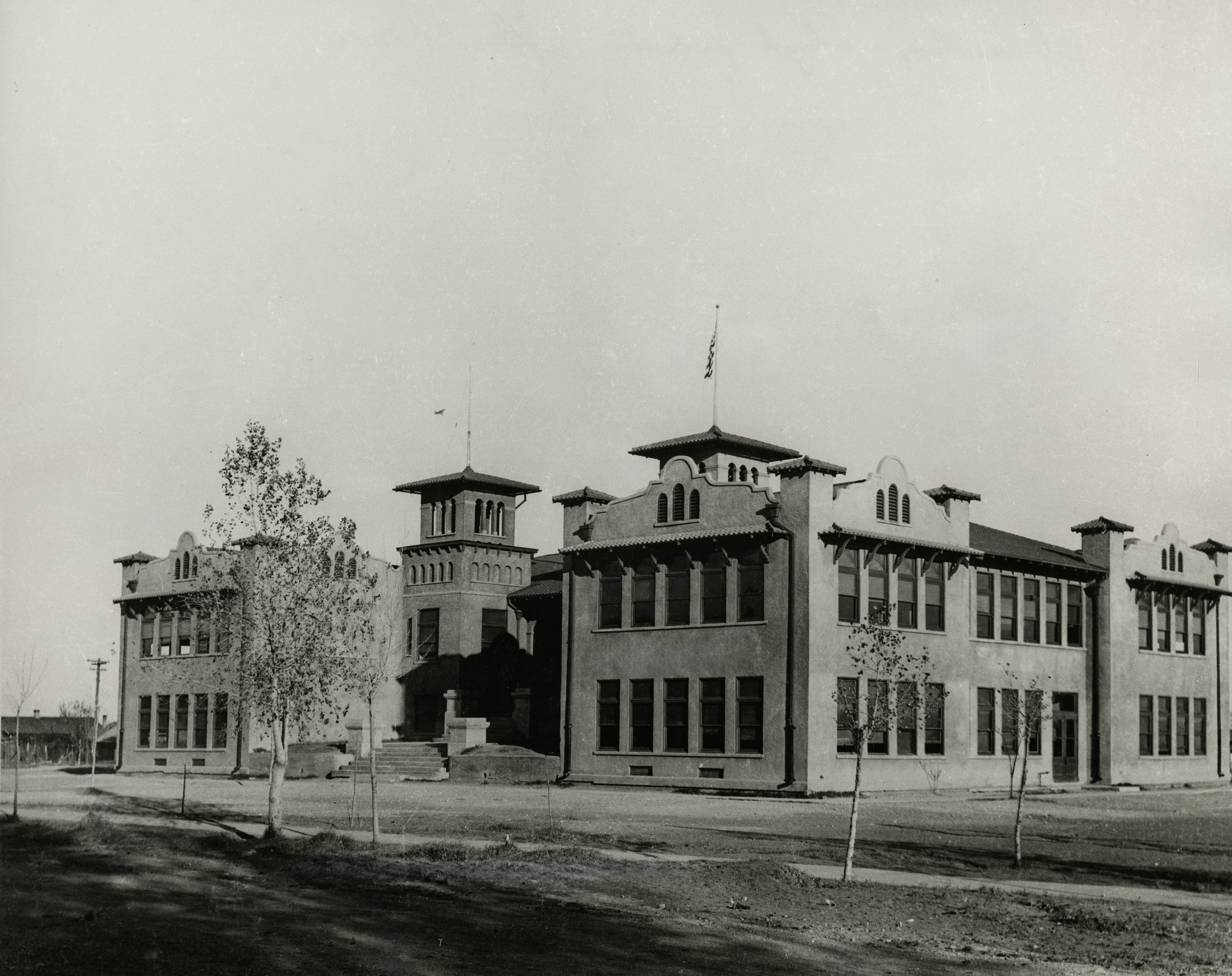
Las Vegas High School photographed sometime in the 1910s.

Before 1956, the state had over 200 local school districts, many serving single communities or even single schools. The legislature eliminated 208 local districts and consolidated them into 17 county-based school districts. Prior to consolidation, for example, Clark County alone had 19 separate school boards overseeing approximately 11,000 students. The move was intended to ensure equitable access to education and administrative efficiency across the state's sparsely populated areas.

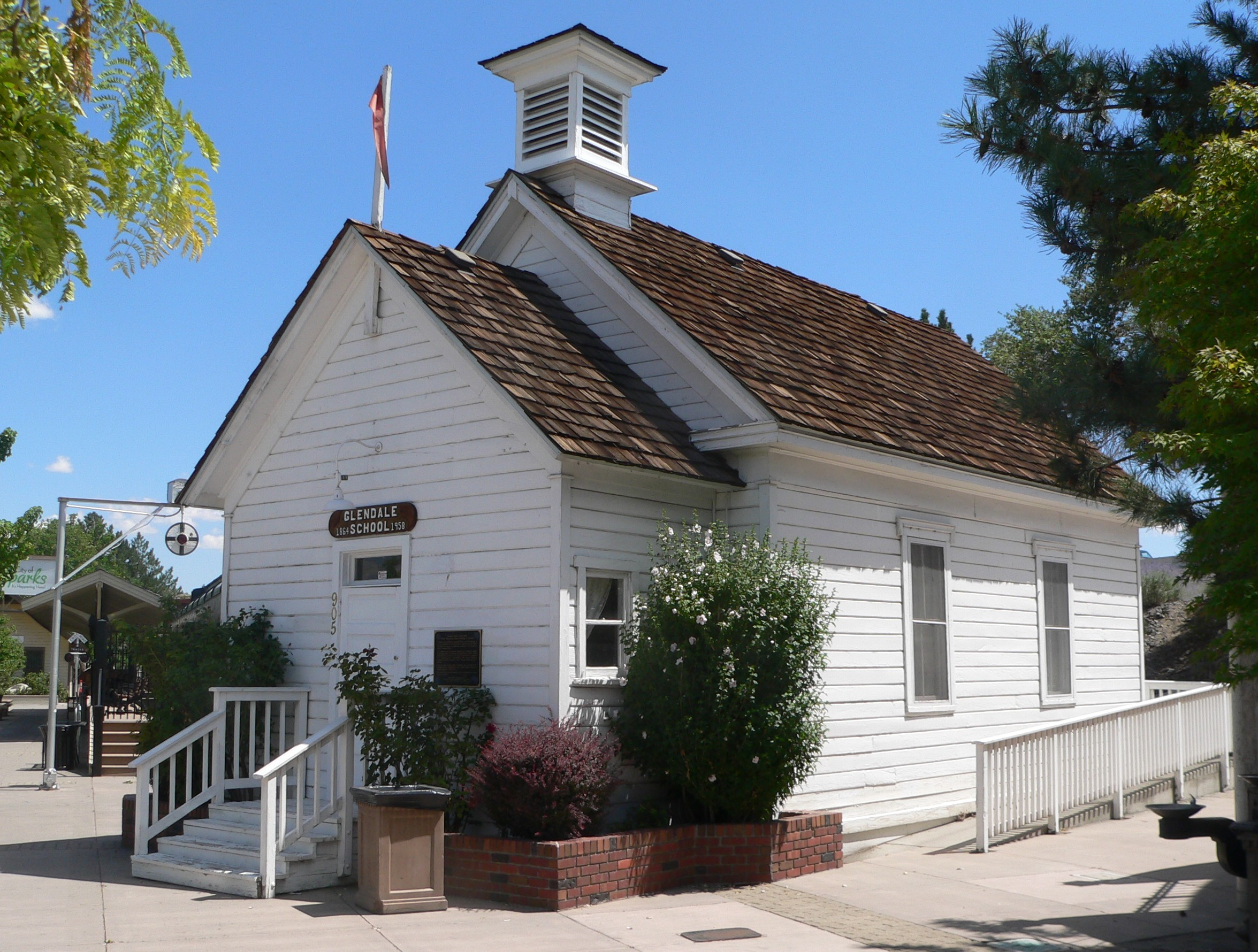
The oldest, standing school building in Nevada, the Glendale School, built in 1864 in Sparks.

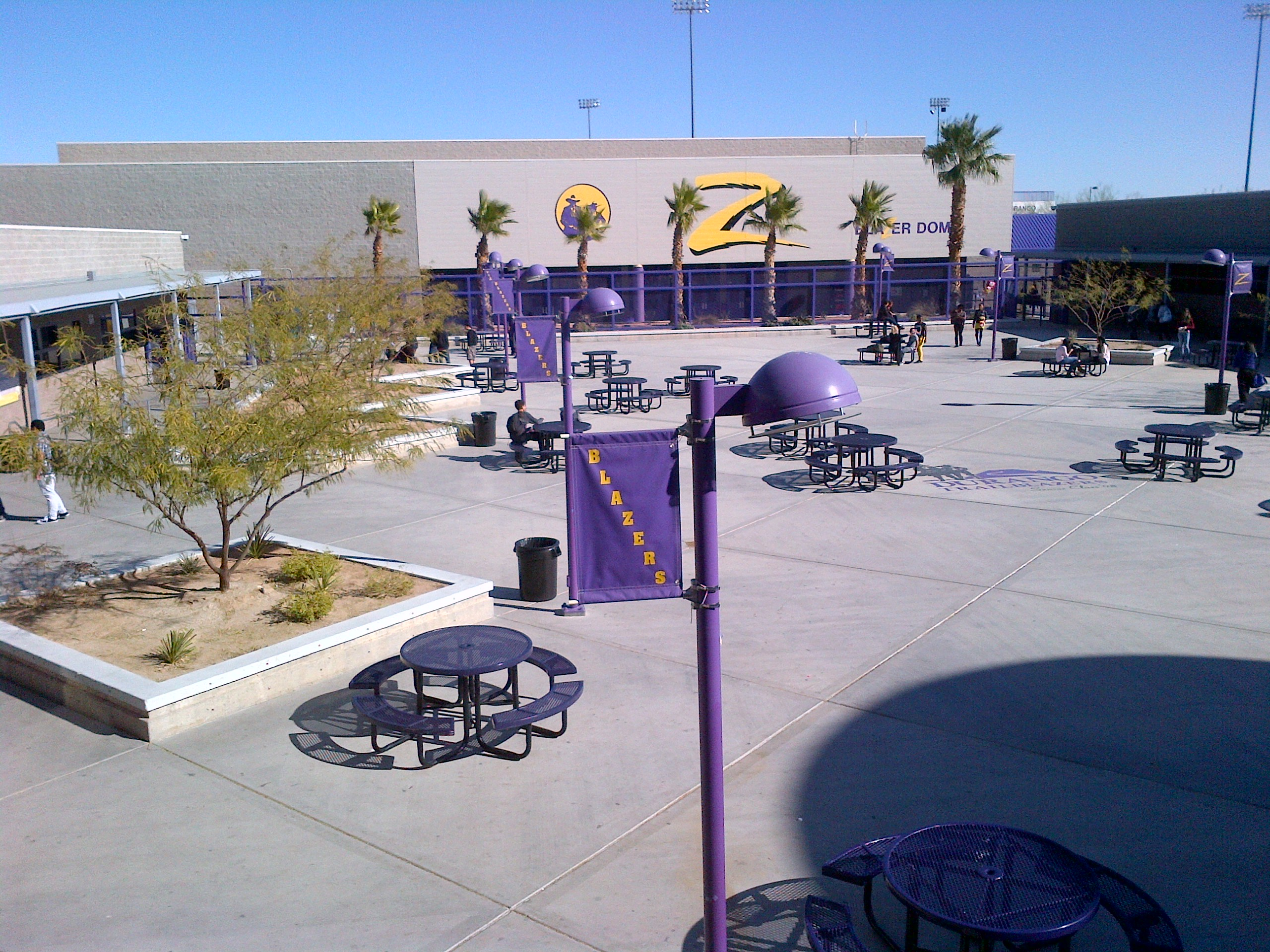
Durango High School in the Clark County School District.

=== Post-reorganization ===
In 1959, the legislature approved a constitutional amendment (ratified by voters) changing the superintendent from an elected position to an appointed one. Beginning in 1957, the board gained authority to appoint the superintendent to a four-year term. The department’s responsibilities expanded with the passage of federal education laws, including Title I, Title IX, IDEA for students with special needs, and the development of the state's school funding formula.

In 2011, the legislature restructured the state board by giving the power to appoint the superintendent to the governor. Under this structure, the governor appoints the superintendent from a list of candidates recommended by the board. The first governor to appoint the state superintendent was Brian Sandoval in 2011. In 2014, the department reorganized internally, dividing into three divisions: student achievement, educator effectiveness, and operational support.

In 2023, state’s apprenticeship council registered Nevada’s first teacher-training apprenticeship program, aimed at strengthening the educator pipeline in partnership with higher education and districts.

In January 2025, Nevada extended its statewide partnership with Discovery Education to continue providing digital instructional content and professional learning across all 17 school districts. In April, the department released a statewide guidance document on artificial intelligence developed with community partners and intended to promote ethical, equitable classroom use of AI.

On July 1, 2025, just weeks before the new school year, which began August 11 in Clark County, the Trump administration attempted to withhold $60 billion of congressionally-appropriated funds for English-language learning, special education, and after-school supports. Right before school started, the United States Department of Education released funds.

In April 2025 department recognized 12 Purple Star schools for supports offered to military-connected students.

From 2019–2025, the department was led by state superintendent Jhone Ebert, who began her career teaching math in CCSD, at a Las Vegas middle school. She left the department to become superintendent of CCSD. Steve Canavero served as interim superintendent from April until October 2025, having previously served as superintendent under Governor Brian Sandoval. Republican Governor Joe Lombardo appointed Victor Wakefield, a former Teach for America executive, to permanently replace Ebert as superintendent effective October 27, 2025.

== Nevada State Board of Education ==
The Nevada State Board of Education sets policy for primary and secondary public education in the state. Although not created by the Nevada Constitution, the board established in 1861 as the Territorial Board of Education. In its earliest form, the board was composed of state officials serving ex officio, including the governor, the territorial superintendent, and other designated officers.

By the twentieth century, the board’s composition evolved to include elected members. From 1973 to 2013, the board was fully elected, with members representing specific geographic areas or serving at-large.

In 2013, at the behest of Governor Brian Sandoval, the Nevada Legislature restructured the board into a complex system of 11 members. Seven board members have voting power, of whom four are elected by the people of Nevada congressional districts while the remaining three are appointed. Additionally, the three voting members appointed by the governor must include a public school teacher (nominated by the state assembly speaker), parent or legal guardian of a public school student (nominated by the state senate majority leader), and an active member of a state business or industry. Additionally, four non-voting members are appointed by the governor but must include a public school student nominated by the Nevada Association of Student Councils (in consultation with the Nevada Youth Legislature), a trustee nominated by the Nevada Association of School Boards, a superintendent nominated by the Nevada Association of School Superintendents, and a regent nominated by the Nevada System of Higher Education.

The board is responsible for setting statewide education policy, approving regulations, and overseeing academic standards. It appoints the superintendent of public instruction, who serves as the chief executive of the Nevada Department of Education.

Seat	Name	Party	Start	Term End	Selection	Voting
1st District	Tricia Braxton	Democratic	January 1, 2025	January 1, 2029	Elected	Yes
2nd District	Angela Orr	Republican	November 1, 2023 (appointed)	January 1, 2029	Elected	Yes
3rd District	Danielle Ford	Democratic	January 1, 2025	January 1, 2029	Elected	Yes
4th District	Tim Hughes, Vice President	Democratic	January 1, 2025	January 1, 2029	Elected	Yes
Business/ Industry	Annette Dawson Owens	Republican	March 1, 2025	March 1, 2027	Appointed	Yes
Parents/ Guardians	Katherine Dockweiler, President	Democratic	March 18, 2019	March 30, 2027	Appointed	Yes
Teachers	Tamara Hudson, Clerk	Democratic	January 22, 2018	January 1, 2027	Appointed	Yes
County Superintendents	Tate Else	Independent	July 1, 2023	June 30, 2026	Appointed	No
Regents	Amy Carvalho	Democratic	November 2025	October 31, 2026	Appointed	No
School Boards	Susan Neal	Democratic	September 1, 2025	August 31, 2026	Appointed	No
Students	Evana Lan	Independent	September 1, 2025	May 31, 2026	Appointed	No

== Educator licensure ==
The department is responsible for issuing, renewing, and overseeing all educator licenses in Nevada, including K–12 classroom teachers and specialized roles such as school administrators, counselors, psychologists, librarians, and nurses. The department manages multiple license types, such as provisional, standard, professional, and retiree licenses, each with specific validity periods and eligibility criteria (e.g., standard licenses valid for five years, professional licenses for up to ten years depending on a licensee’s degree level).

The department sets requirements for qualifications, collects applications and supporting documentation via its OPAL online portal, coordinates background checks with state and federal law enforcement, facilitates fingerprinting, and issues official credentials. Since mid-2018, the department no longer accepts paper applications; all initial applications, renewals, and endorsements must be submitted electronically via OPAL.

Standards set for many requirements of educator licensure include minimum testing scores (for the Praxis Core, Praxis subject tests, etc), education requirements for different areas of licensure, and the policies regarding international teachers. The agency also has the authority to issue temporary emergency licenses. With the teacher shortage growing more acute in recent years, emergency licenses have been increasingly issued to highly-educated or skilled individuals for high-needs teaching areas who lack training in teaching methodology. Emergency licenses are typically non-renewable; recipients have three years to attend an alternative route-to-licensure program to be granted a standard teaching license.

In 2023–24, a department commission established new regulations to streamline professional development requirements: irrespective of when a license was issued, renewal now requires either 90 clock hours of professional development, six semester credits, or a combination thereof, during each licensure cycle, delivered by approved providers.

== See also ==
- List of school districts in Nevada
- List of Nevada state agencies
- Nevada System of Higher Education
- List of state departments of education
- United States Department of Education
