= Nevada High-Speed Rail Authority =

U.S. state government agency

The Nevada High-Speed Rail Authority (NHSRA) is a Nevada state agency established pursuant to the Nevada High-Speed Rail Act (S.B. 457) to develop and implement high-speed intercity rail service and to find contractors to build the line. The authority is headed by a chairman, and the position is currently occupied by George Smith. The Nevada High-Speed Rail Authority is headquartered in Las Vegas, Nevada.

== History ==
The bill to establish the agency was first introduced in the Nevada Legislature on April 7, 2015, and was passed into law on May 20, 2015, by a vote of 40–1.

== Purpose ==
The authority is intended to select a franchisee to construct and operate a high-speed rail system in Nevada, which is to be known as the Nevada High-Speed Rail System. In 2015, they selected Brightline West as the company who shall be constructing the high-speed rail system that connect Las Vegas to Southern California. As of 2021, the first track is meant to connect Los Angeles and California, with the first few stations being Victorville, Rancho Cucamonga, and Palmdale, though progress is still ongoing.

== See also ==
- High-speed rail in the United States
- Rail transportation in the United States
