= General jurisdiction =

A court of general jurisdiction, in the law of the United States, is a court with authority to hear cases in law and in equity of all kinds – criminal, civil, family, probate, and other legal claims.

== State courts of general jurisdiction ==
U.S. states often provide their state trial courts with general jurisdiction. The Legal Information Institute notes that "often, states will vest their trial courts with general jurisdiction" – with the ability to hear state and federal matters in law and in equity, although these courts may also organize themselves into divisions or departments to handle particular matters (eg., by assigning a judge of the court of general jurisdiction to hear that court's criminal matters, or probate, or family law).

== Federal courts of limited jurisdiction ==
All United States federal courts are courts of limited jurisdiction, limited by constitution and statute, and to the extent that they can not hear many kinds of claims brought under state law, but United States district courts have been described as "the courts of general jurisdiction in the federal court system" (as they can generally provide redress in both law and equity, as well as hearing both civil and criminal cases). Bankruptcy is dealt with as a separate part of the federal district court, though they are viewed as the same unit, and decisions of the bankruptcy court are generally appealable to the district court. This is a result of being created under different articles of the Constitution, bankruptcy law was established in a separate article from the article that established the federal judiciary.

== General jurisdiction and bringing defendants into the forum ==
General jurisdiction often provides courts with the widest possible ability to take jurisdiction over defendants (particularly corporations), even when contact with the forum is minimal.

== General jurisdiction and judicial immunity ==
One significant effect of the classification of a court is the civil or criminal liability that a judge from that court might face for stepping beyond the bounds of that court. Judges are able to claim judicial immunity for acts that are not completely beyond their jurisdiction. For example, if a probate judge of limited jurisdiction were to sentence a person to jail, that judge would not have immunity and could be sued because the probate judge has no jurisdiction to effect a criminal sentence. However, a judge in a court of general jurisdiction who happened to be assigned to a probate case would be immune from suit for sending a party to jail, because handing down a criminal sentence is not completely beyond the jurisdiction of such a judge.

In the United States, this principle was established by the Supreme Court in Stump v. Sparkman. The Court found in that case that an Indiana judge was immune from a suit brought by a young woman whom the judge had ordered to be sterilized, at the behest of the woman's mother. Because the Indiana court was a court of general jurisdiction, and no law of Indiana expressly prohibited the judge from issuing such an order, the Supreme Court found that the order was not completely beyond the jurisdiction of that judge, and therefore the order was subject to judicial immunity.

== See also ==
- Limited jurisdiction
- Subject-matter jurisdiction
- Ordinary court
- Court of inherent jurisdiction, a proximate concept in Commonwealth common law
