= Nevada Department of Business and Industry =

State agency in Nevada, United States

The Nevada Department of Business and Industry is a cabinet-level Nevada government state agency that oversees business and consumer regulations in the state and promotes the development and growth of businesses in Nevada.

== History ==
The department was established in 1963. It was initially called the Department of Commerce and consisted of four divisions: banking, insurance, real estate, as well as savings and loan. The state fire marshal became one of the department's divisions in May 1973, before a consumer affair division was also added in July the same year. In 1975, the credit union division became part of the department, and in 1979, the housing and manufactured housing divisions also joined the department. The department's structure underwent several other changes before finally settling into twelve divisions as of 2021.

== Divisions ==
The following are the twelve divisions that make up the Department of Business and Industry:

1. Attorney for Injured Workers
2. Government Employee-Management Relations Board
3. Financial Institutions
4. Nevada Housing Division (Includes Manufactured Housing)
5. Division of Industrial Relations
6. Division of Insurance
7. Labor Commissioner
8. Mortgage Lending Division
9. Nevada Transportation Authority
10. Real Estate Division
11. Taxicab Authority
12. Consumer Affairs

Aside from the above divisions, the department also manages several offices under the oversight of the Director's Office, which are Office of Business, Finance, and Planning; Nevada Consumer Affairs, and Ombudsman of Consumer Affairs for Minorities. There are also a number of active boards, commissions, and advisory committees for a range of relevant issues, from industrial insurance to occupational safety and health.
