= Nevada State Office of Energy =

Nevada Governor's Office of Energy

The Nevada State Office of Energy, also known as the Nevada Governor's Office of Energy, is a Nevada state agency that focuses on managing and regulating Nevada's energy resources to ensure that they can meet the needs of local industries while also adhering to renewable energy and energy conservation principles. The current director of the Nevada Office of Energy is David Bobzien. The agency is headquartered in Carson City, Nevada.

== History ==
The agency was established in 1975 to promote efficient energy use in commercial and residential settings, and was originally known as the Nevada State Office of Energy. It underwent several changes in 1983 and 1993, before a select committee on energy was created in 2001. Not long after that, the committee became a permanent part of the Governor's Office, and became known as the Office of Energy.

== Programs ==
The following are the active programs in the Nevada Office of Energy as of 2021:

- Building Energy Codes
- Green Building Tax Abatements
- Home Energy Retrofit Opportunity for Seniors
- Lower Income Solar Energy Program (LISEP)
- Nevada Electric Highway
- Performance Contracting
- Project Funding Partnerships
- Renewable Energy Systems Determinations
- Renewable Energy Tax Abatements
- Revolving Loans for Renewable Energy, Energy Efficiency, and Energy Conservation

== See also ==
- Energy conservation in the United States
- Energy policy in the United States
- Renewable energy in the United States
- United States Department of Energy
