= Nevada State Library, Archives and Public Records =

Official State Library of Nevada

- Great Seal of the State of Nevada

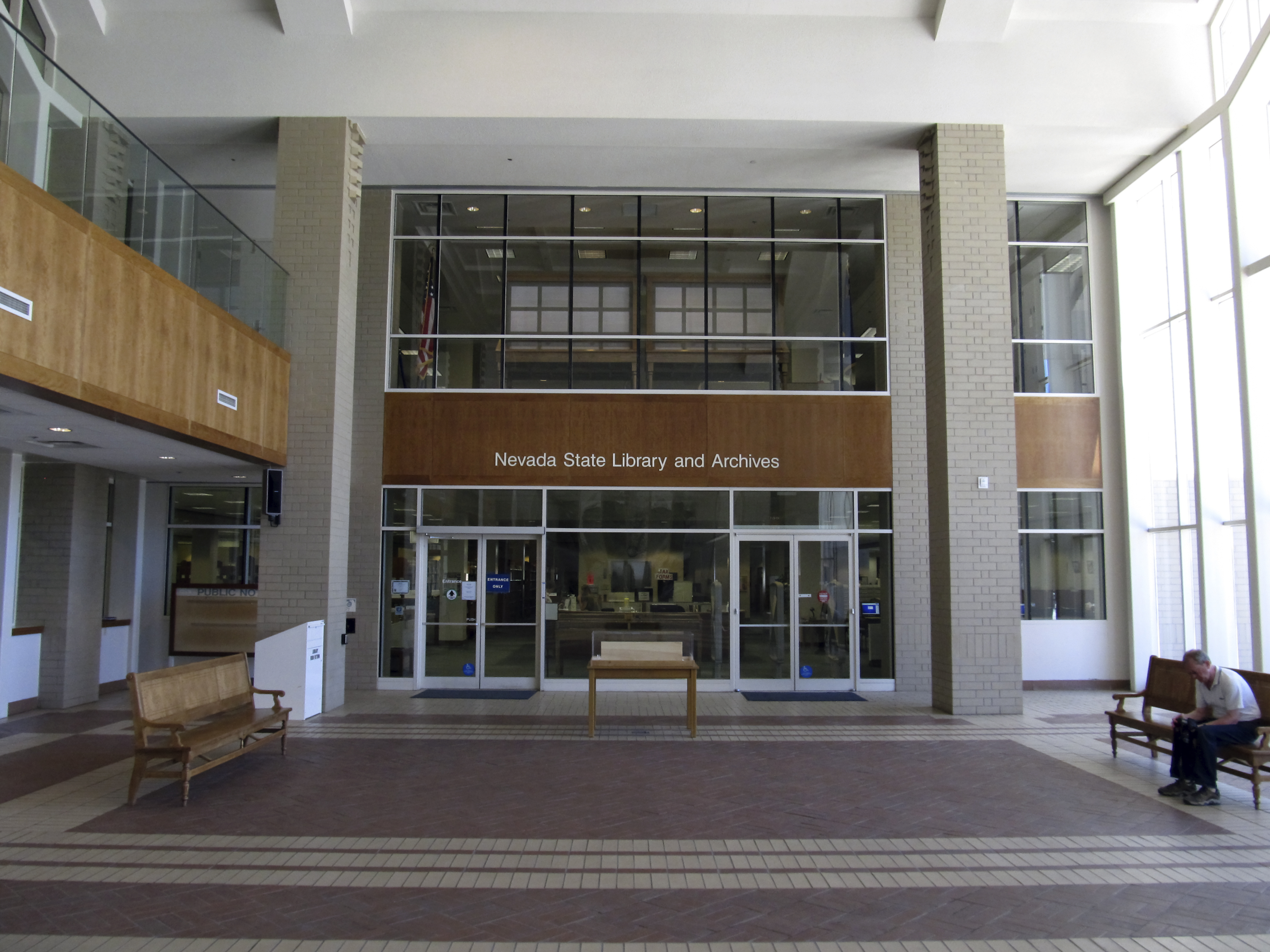

Agency overview
- Formed: 1863
- Jurisdiction: State of Nevada
- Headquarters: 100 North Stewart Street; Carson City, Nevada, United States
- Agency executives: Mike Strom, Administrator; Cyndi Shein, State Archivist and Deputy Administrator, Archives and Records; James "Audie" Robinson, State Records Manager
- Parent agency: Nevada Department of Administration
- Website: nsla.nv.gov

The Nevada State Library, Archives and Public Records is the official state library and archives of the U.S. state of Nevada. Located in the state capital of Carson City, the library and archives also include the records services department which manages state, county, and municipal public records.

As an agency, it is responsible for supervising public library certification and standards, Library Services and Technology Act grants, bookmobile funding and training for library trustees as well as administering programs such as the state's Talking Book Services for print-disabled users, Nevada Center for the Book, and the Nevada State Data Center to help localities work with census data.

== History ==
Initially, the state library was a collection of reference works for the use of state government officers, with the secretary of state designated the ex officio state librarian. The responsibility of this position went back and forth between the secretary of state and the lieutenant governor, until 1915, when the state library commission was created and the state librarian became an administrator supervised by them.

The Nevada State Library, Archives and Public Records has a history and timeline of historical highlights available on their website, along with lists of all State Librarians and Archivists (1860–present).

== See also ==
- List of libraries in the United States
