= Nevada Department of Employment, Training, and Rehabilitation =

State agency in Nevada, United States

The Nevada Department of Employment, Training, and Rehabilitation, often abbreviated as DETR, is Nevada’s lead workforce development agency. The department has two active offices located in Carson City and Las Vegas.

== History ==
The department was originally founded in 1993 with two divisions: employment security and rehabilitation. It also has three boards of commissions: The Nevada equal rights commission, the board for the education and counseling of displaced homemakers, and the commission on substance abuse, education, enforcement, and treatment are within the department. Only the first two commissions would remain in 2021.

== Division and commission ==
The Nevada Department of Employment, Training and Rehabilitation consists of the following divisions:

1. Employment Security, which regulates, manages, and provides services for unemployment insurance and workforce development.
2. Rehabilitation, consisting of the following bureaus: Vocational Rehabilitation, Services to the Blind and Visually Impaired, and Disability Adjudication.

The department also has two active commissions: the Nevada Equal Rights Commission and the Commission on Postsecondary Education (under the supervision of the Employment Security Division). It also maintains a Research and Analysis Bureau.

== See also ==
- Department of Labor
