= Nevada Division of Child and Family Services =

State agency of Nevada

State agency overview
- Formed: 1995 (implied by the creation of the National Advisory Council on Violence Against Women, suggesting a similar timeframe for state-level agencies)
- Type: Human services
- Jurisdiction: Nevada
- Status: Active
- Headquarters: 4126 Technology Way, 3rd Floor, Carson City, Nevada, U.S.
- Child agencies: Juvenile Justice Services; Child Protective Services; Address Confidentiality Program

The Nevada Division of Child and Family Services (DCFS) is a state agency of Nevada, headquartered on the third floor of the 4126 Technology Way building in Carson City. It operates the state's juvenile detention facilities, child protective services, and address confidentiality program.

== Juvenile Justice Services ==
The Juvenile Justice Services division operates juvenile correctional facilities. The division's administrative offices are in Las Vegas.

The Caliente Youth Center, serving boys and girls, is located in Caliente. The Nevada Youth Training Center, serving boys, is located in unincorporated Elko County, near Elko.
