= Limited jurisdiction =

Court jurisdiction over only some kinds of matters

Limited jurisdiction, or special jurisdiction, is the court's jurisdiction only on certain types of cases such as bankruptcy, and family matters.

Courts of limited jurisdiction, as opposed to general jurisdiction, derive power from an issuing authority, such as a constitution or a statute. Special jurisdiction courts must demonstrate that they are authorized to exert jurisdiction under their issuing authority. In contrast, general jurisdiction courts need only to demonstrate that they may assert in personal jurisdiction over a party.

== Differences ==
Sometimes the term "special courts" is used to refer to courts of limited jurisdiction: "Special courts" has unfortunate connotations, however, because the designation is often given by totalitarian governments to tribunals set up to persecute government opponents or otherwise help commit human rights abuses. That is a different kind of justice: not because it does not confer upon courts the power to hear only certain types of cases; but above all because a political trial denies the basic principles of the due process of law.

== Examples ==
Courts of limited jurisdiction "exist in virtually all modern nations. In the United States, for instance, the federal court system includes several important courts of limited jurisdiction, including the U.S. Tax Court, the U.S. Court of Federal Claims, the U.S. Court of International Trade, and the U.S. Court of Military Appeals. Courts of limited jurisdiction exist in Spain and in many Latin American countries, such as Mexico, Chile, Venezuela and Brazil".

Within state court systems of the United States, there are many types of limited jurisdiction courts. Limited jurisdiction court systems across the states vary widely from one another. Most state courts of limited jurisdiction hear criminal, probate, juvenile, or domestic relations cases.

== See also ==
- Specialized court
- General jurisdiction
