= Nevada Revised Statutes =

Laws of the state

The Nevada Revised Statutes (NRS) are all the current codified laws of the State of Nevada. Nevada law consists of the Constitution of Nevada (the state constitution) and Nevada Revised Statutes. The Nevada Supreme Court interprets the law and constitution of Nevada. The Statutes of Nevada are a compilation of all legislation passed by the Nevada Legislature during a particular Legislative Session. The Nevada Administrative Code (NAC) is the codified, administrative regulations of the Executive Branch. The Nevada Register is a compilation of proposed, adopted, emergency and temporary administrative regulations, notices of intent and informational statements. Nevada Supreme Court Opinions are the written decisions of the Nevada Supreme Court.
