= PEPCON disaster =

1988 explosions and fire in Nevada

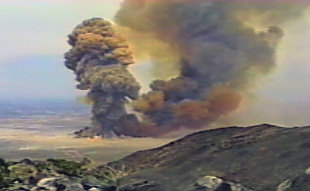
- The largest of the several explosions at the PEPCON plant
- Date: May 4, 1988; 38 years ago
- Location: American Pacific Corp's Pacific Engineering and Production Company of Nevada (PEPCON), Henderson, Nevada, United States; 36°02′07″N 115°02′05″W
- Also known as: PEPCON blast
- Cause: Unknown
- Filmed by: Dennis Todd
- Deaths: 2
- Injuries: 372
- Property damage: US $100 million ($228 million in 2024 dollars)

On May 4, 1988, a fire followed by several explosions occurred at the Pacific Engineering and Production Company of Nevada (PEPCON) chemical plant in Henderson, Nevada, United States. The disaster caused two fatalities, 372 injuries, and an estimated $100 million of damage. A large portion of the Las Vegas Valley within a 10-mile (16 km) radius of the plant was affected and several agencies activated disaster plans.

== Background ==
The Pacific Engineering and Production Company of Nevada (PEPCON) plant began operating in 1958 in the Henderson area southeast of Las Vegas. Clark County Fire Department historical material notes the site was attractive because of inexpensive hydroelectric power from Hoover Dam and the region's dry climate, which simplified handling and storage of the product.

PEPCON manufactured ammonium perchlorate (AP), an oxidizer used in solid-propellant rocket motors. The United States Fire Administration (USFA) described PEPCON as one of only two "free world" producers of ammonium perchlorate at the time, with the other producer located within Clark County, less than 1.5 mi (2.4 km) away. A contemporaneous federal case-study on defense industrial emergencies similarly emphasized the national impact, stating that the May 1988 disaster eliminated roughly half of U.S. ammonium perchlorate production capacity and forced allocations and recovery actions for defense and space users.

The USFA reported the plant occupied roughly eight acres and included multiple buildings plus outdoor chemical storage and process areas; it had originally been constructed in the 1950s in an isolated desert area, though subsequent metropolitan growth reduced that isolation. By 1988, the facility sat in an unincorporated industrial "island" surrounded by the City of Henderson, in a region that had hosted defense-related industry since World War II. Nearby exposures included a large marshmallow factory within 500 ft (150 m) of the PEPCON site, while the closest residential and other commercial occupancies were roughly 1.5 to 2 mi (2.4 to 3.2 km) away.

Estimates of the ammonium perchlorate inventory on site were substantial. The USFA reported approximately 8.5 million pounds (3,900,000 kg) of finished product stored at the facility. Clark County Fire Department historical material likewise reported company estimates of roughly 9 million pounds (4,100,000 kg) of ammonium perchlorate present at the time of the explosions. In addition to chemical hazards, the USFA noted that a 16-inch (41 cm) high-pressure natural gas transmission line (about 300 psi (2.1 MPa)) ran underneath the plant and supplied it through a pressure-reducing assembly.

== Fire and explosions ==
Several theories have been advanced concerning the cause of the fire and explosions. The Clark County Fire Department (CCFD) in Clark County, Nevada, did not issue a formal report but did issue a two-page press release on July 15, 1988, describing what it believed to be the cause of the fire; this and other CCFD information was incorporated into a report by the United States Fire Administration (USFA).

The United States Department of Labor (USDOL), working with the Division of Occupational Safety and Health (DOSH), issued a lengthy report on the accident that discounted the cause and origin findings of the CCFD. USDOL noted that the Arson Division of CCFD maintained control over the site for several weeks and that DOSH and PEPCON investigating teams were not permitted entry into the facility until 13 days after the event. The first significant DOSH inspection did not occur until 33 days after the fire. At that time, the damaged areas had been disturbed and key evidence had been either displaced or removed from the site.

According to the USFA report, the fire originated around a drying process structure at the plant between 11:30 a.m. and 11:40 a.m. that day. USDOL reported that at least one fire was burning in a barrel located at the west side of the southern portion of the building partition, which separated the batch dryer from the batch tanks in the process building. Fire was also reported on the north wall of the batch dryer section of the process building. A windstorm had damaged a fiberglass structure and employees were using a welding torch to repair the steel frame. The USFA report stated that this activity caused a fire that spread rapidly in the fiberglass material, accelerated by nearby ammonium perchlorate residue.

The USDOL report discounted this theory while relying upon eyewitness testimony and scientific burn tests. Ten people testified that they saw the fire and/or participated in early fire-fighting activities. USDOL reported that testimony indicated that welding operations had taken place somewhere between 30 and 90 minutes prior to the discovery of the fire. These operations took place on the northwest wall of the building; the vicinity was thoroughly washed down prior to and during this task. USDOL stated that the likelihood of transferring hot molten metal a distance of over 70 feet (20 m) through and around batch tanks to the batch dryer was considered extremely remote. USDOL stated that sparks from such operations would not present enough energy to ignite ordinary combustibles in close proximity, let alone at distances of up to 70 feet (20 m) and concluded that "the possibility of welding and cutting operations as a source of ignition is considered very low, in the author's professional opinion".

Both the USFA and USDOL reports noted that the flames spread to 55 US gal (210 L) plastic drums containing the product that were stored next to the building as employees tried in vain to put the fire out inside the building with water hoses. USFA reported that the first of a series of explosions occurred in the drums about 10 to 20 minutes after ignition, and employees had begun fleeing on foot or in cars. USDOL reported this differently, stating that the fire spread rapidly to the north side of the partition, northeast and south walls by radiative and convective heat transfer. The extremely rapid fire spread in the process building and subsequent growth to other buildings was primarily due to the highly combustible fiberglass reinforced siding panels and close spacing of adjacent buildings. High winds blowing in a northeasterly direction were a contributing factor. Product stored in an area north of the process building heated up and approximately seven minutes later at 11:51 a.m., an aluminum econobin containing approximately 4,000 pounds (1,800 kg) of AP located about 30 feet (9 m) west of the northwest corner of the building detonated, causing damage to the surrounding structures and batch dryer.

The yield of this first detonation was estimated to be the equivalent of between 17 and 41 kg (37 and 90 pounds) of TNT.

USDOL reported that considerable evidence suggested that natural gas leaks were present in the plant. The on-site investigation of the plant revealed the presence of carbonaceous deposits around the perimeter of the foundation of the batch dryer building. Other visual evidence of burning, possibly natural gas, from the ground was discovered in various portions of the plant including beneath the gas and telephone vaults and portions of the asphalt paving.

USFA reported that the fire continued to spread in the stacks of drums creating a large fireball and leading to the first of four explosions in the drum storage area. USFA reported that the fire then made its way into the storage area for the filled aluminum shipping containers, resulting in two small explosions there, and a massive explosion about four minutes after the first. USDOL reported that six or seven detonations occurred solely in areas where aluminum econo bins or steel drums were utilized to store the product of nominal 200 micron size. USFA reported that little fuel remained after that, causing the flame to diminish rapidly, except for a fireball that was supplied by the high-pressure natural gas line underneath the plant, which had been ruptured by one of the explosions. That gas line was shut off at about 1:00 p.m. by the gas company at a valve about a mile away.

USDOL also reported that there was strong evidence of a natural gas fire prior to the second explosion at the northeast edge of the plant within a 6 ft × 200 ft (2 m × 61 m) narrow band of soft sand. The leading edge of this sandbar was located approximately 1,100 ft (340 m) from the batch dryer building.

USFA reported that there were a total of seven explosions during the accident. Eyewitness testimony and a video, which was filmed by Dennis Todd and began after the first detonation, as well as other resources indicated there were five high-order detonations: one north of the batch dryer, one in the storage area south of the administration building, two on the loading dock and the final largest detonation in the eastern storage area, where the gas line burned after the detonations occurred. The two largest explosions produced seismic waves measuring 3.0 and 3.5 on the Richter scale. Much of the approximately 4,500 metric tons of AP either burned/decomposed in combination with a fuel or exploded, with the final detonation creating a crater 15 feet (4.6 m) deep and 200 feet (61 m) long in the eastern storage area. A large amount of AP remained on the ground after the incident and material was subsequently recovered and recycled within one year. The largest explosion had an estimated yield of 0.25 kiloton TNT equivalent (similar to a 1.0 kiloton nuclear explosion in free air).

USDOL concluded that the initiation mode of the fire was undetermined. It stated that smoking, sparking of electrical equipment, or frictionally ignited gas are among the probable igniting sources.

About 75 people escaped successfully, but two were killed in the last two larger explosions - Roy Westerfield, PEPCON's comptroller, who had stayed behind to call the CCFD and Bruce Halker, the vice president of operations who had stayed behind to evacuate the remaining employees. Employees at the nearby Kidd marshmallow factory heard the explosion and also evacuated.

Following the first explosion, the fire and subsequent blasts were filmed by Dennis Todd, a subcontractor for KRLR who was working on the television station's Black Mountain transmission tower. After the explosions concluded, he was flown to NBC in Burbank, where the footage was then distributed to stations nationwide.

== Fire department response ==
The fire chief of the City of Henderson, who was leaving the main fire station about 1.5 miles (2.4 km) north of the PEPCON facility, spotted the huge smoke column and immediately ordered his units to the scene. As he approached the plant, he could see a massive white and orange fireball about 100 ft (30 m) in diameter and dozens of people fleeing the scene.

At about 11:54, as he approached the site, the first of the two major explosions sent a shock wave that shattered the windows of his car and showered him and his passenger with glass. The driver of a heavily damaged vehicle coming away from the plant then advised the chief about the danger of subsequent larger explosions, which prompted the chief to turn around and head back toward his station. The other units also stopped heading toward the site after the explosion.

The second major explosion nearly destroyed the chief's car; after he and his passenger were cut by flying glass, he was able to drive the damaged vehicle to a hospital. The windshields of a responding Henderson Fire Department vehicle were blown in, injuring the driver and firefighters with shattered glass.

Several nearby fire departments responded to the accident. Clark County units staged 1.5 miles (2.4 km) from the scene and assisted injured firefighters. Recognizing the danger posed by a fire that was beyond their firefighting capabilities, they made no attempt to approach or fight the fire.

== Evacuation and overhaul of the scene ==
The Henderson Police Department, Nevada Highway Patrol, Las Vegas Metropolitan Police Department and the Nevada National Guard evacuated a five-mile (8 km) radius around the plant, concentrating on areas downwind of the explosion. Roads in the area were clogged in both directions due to residents trying to leave and curious spectators headed toward the scene, creating a traffic jam that took over two hours to clear.

More than an hour after the first explosions, authorities concluded that the airborne products could be a respiratory irritant; they were not considered highly toxic, nor was the danger of further explosions estimated as high. Authorities had considered expanding the evacuation zone to 10 miles (16 km), but the idea was dropped due to the new information, although a few cases of respiratory irritation were reported in a small community about 30 miles (50 km) downwind.

Crews in protective clothing headed to the scene to clean up, a slow process due to leaking tanks of anhydrous ammonia and residue from acids and other products. Several firefighters had to undergo treatment for respiratory irritation. Overhaul continued until dusk and resumed the following day. Authorities found the remains of Bruce Halker, the plant's vice president of operations, but no trace of the other victim, comptroller Roy Westerfield, was ever found.

Emergency medical services treated and transported about 100 patients to five hospitals in the region, with the remaining 200 to 300 heading into hospitals on their own volition. Many of the injured had been struck by flying glass when windows were shattered. Fifteen firefighters were injured.

About four hours after the incident, hospitals were advised by the fire department that their disaster plans could be deactivated.

== Damage assessment and aftermath ==
The explosions leveled the PEPCON plant and Kidd & Company marshmallow factory. Damage within a 1.5-mile (2.4 km) radius was severe, including destroyed cars, damage to buildings, and downed power lines. Damage to windows and moderate structure damage was recorded within three miles (4.8 km) of the incident.

The damage reached a radius of up to 10 miles (16 km), including shattered windows, doors blown off their hinges, cracked windows and injuries from flying glass and debris. At McCarran International Airport, seven miles (11 km) away in Las Vegas, windows were cracked and doors were pushed open. The shock wave buffeted a Boeing 737 on final approach.

An investigation estimated that the larger explosion was equivalent to 0.25 kiloton of TNT, approximately the same yield of a tactical nuclear weapon.

In 1991, the Nevada legislature passed the Chemical Catastrophe Prevention Act, which led to Nevada's Chemical Accident Prevention Program.

PEPCON had only $1 million in stated liability insurance, but costs paid by its insurer significantly exceeded this amount. A courtroom battle involving dozens of insurance companies and over 50 law firms resulted in a $71 million 1992 settlement (equivalent to $142 million in 2024) with contributions from multiple parties including AMPAC/PEPCON and Southwest Gas Corporation that was divided among insurance companies on subrogation claims as well as the victims and their families.

After the incident, American Pacific Corporation (AMPAC), which had acquired PEPCON from its founders in 1982, changed the name of the perchlorate chemicals manufacturing subsidiary to PEPCON Production, Inc and within one year, to Western Electrochemical Co. (WECCO). It built a new ammonium perchlorate plant in an isolated area about 14 miles (23 km) outside of Cedar City, Utah with a substantial voluntary no-build buffer around it. Natural gas service to this WECCO facility is handled in a different manner (mostly above ground away from AP storage areas) than was the case at PEPCON. On July 30, 1997, an explosion at that plant killed one and injured four.

As of March 2023, the former PEPCON area has been redeveloped for commercial and institutional uses in the Gibson Springs/Warm Springs corridor near American Pacific Drive and Wigwam Parkway. Notable nearby facilities include Touro University Nevada (874 American Pacific Drive), Ocean Spray Cranberries LLC (1301 American Pacific Drive), and Graham Packaging / Continental Pet Technologies (875 American Pacific Drive), along with other large industrial/distribution tenants in the immediate area.

== See also ==
- List of industrial disasters
