= MGM Grand fire =

1980 casino fire in Paradise, Nevada, US

Coordinates: 36°06′51″N 115°10′20″W

- Date: November 21, 1980
- Venue: MGM Grand Hotel and Casino
- Location: Paradise, Nevada, U.S.
- Type: Fire
- Cause: Electrical ground fault caused by an electrical receptacle
- Deaths: 85 (78 guests, 7 employees)
- Injuries: ~600–700+

The MGM Grand fire occurred on Friday, November 21, 1980, at the MGM Grand Hotel and Casino (later Bally’s, now Horseshoe Las Vegas, and unrelated to the current MGM Grand Las Vegas), located on the Las Vegas Strip in Paradise, Nevada. The fire killed 85 people, most through smoke inhalation. The fire began from a refrigerated pastry display case in a restaurant located on the first floor. A fire engulfed the resort's casino, and smoke spread into the hotel tower.

The tragedy remains the deadliest disaster in Nevada history, and the third-deadliest hotel fire in modern U.S. history, after the 1946 Winecoff Hotel fire in Atlanta that killed 119 people and the 1986 Dupont Plaza Hotel fire in Puerto Rico that killed 97. The incident led to the reformation of fire safety guidelines and codes in the state.

== Fire ==
At the time of the fire, about 5,000 people were in the MGM Grand, a casino and 26-story hotel with more than 2,000 hotel rooms that had opened in 1973. At approximately 7:07 a.m. on Friday, November 21, 1980, a fire began in a restaurant known as The Deli. The fire was discovered during a tile crew's inspection of the restaurant. A crew supervisor noticed a flickering light, which turned out to be a wall of flames. An employee of the hotel's bakery recounted how just after 7 a.m. he saw smoke coming from the ceiling vents just before the lights went out. MGM security was immediately advised of the situation, and alerted the Clark County Fire Department (CCFD) which was the first agency to respond. CCFD received a call reporting the fire at 7:17 a.m., with the first engine arriving on site from across the street at 7:19 a.m. A third alarm was called at 7:22 a.m., and a Metro Police helicopter pilot requested all available helicopters at 7:30 a.m.

Other agencies included the North Las Vegas Fire Department, Las Vegas Fire & Rescue, and the Henderson Fire Department. A massive helicopter rescue effort from Nellis Air Force Base pulled 1,000 people from the roof of the MGM Grand, involving both U.S. Air Force UH-1N (Hueys) from the 57th Wing based in Indian Springs and CH-3E (Jolly Green Giants) from the 1st Special Operations Wing based in Hurlburt Field, Florida (which were in Nevada to participate in Red Flag '80).

The fire spread to the lobby, fed by wallpaper, PVC piping, glue, and plastic mirrors, racing west through the casino floor at a speed of 15–19 ft/s (4.6–5.8 m/s; 10–13 mph; 16–21 km/h) until a massive fireball blew out the main entrance, facing the Las Vegas Strip. From the time the fire was noticed, it took six minutes for the entire casino floor to be fully engulfed. It spread across the areas of the casino in which no fire sprinklers were installed. Eighteen people died in the casino level of the hotel.

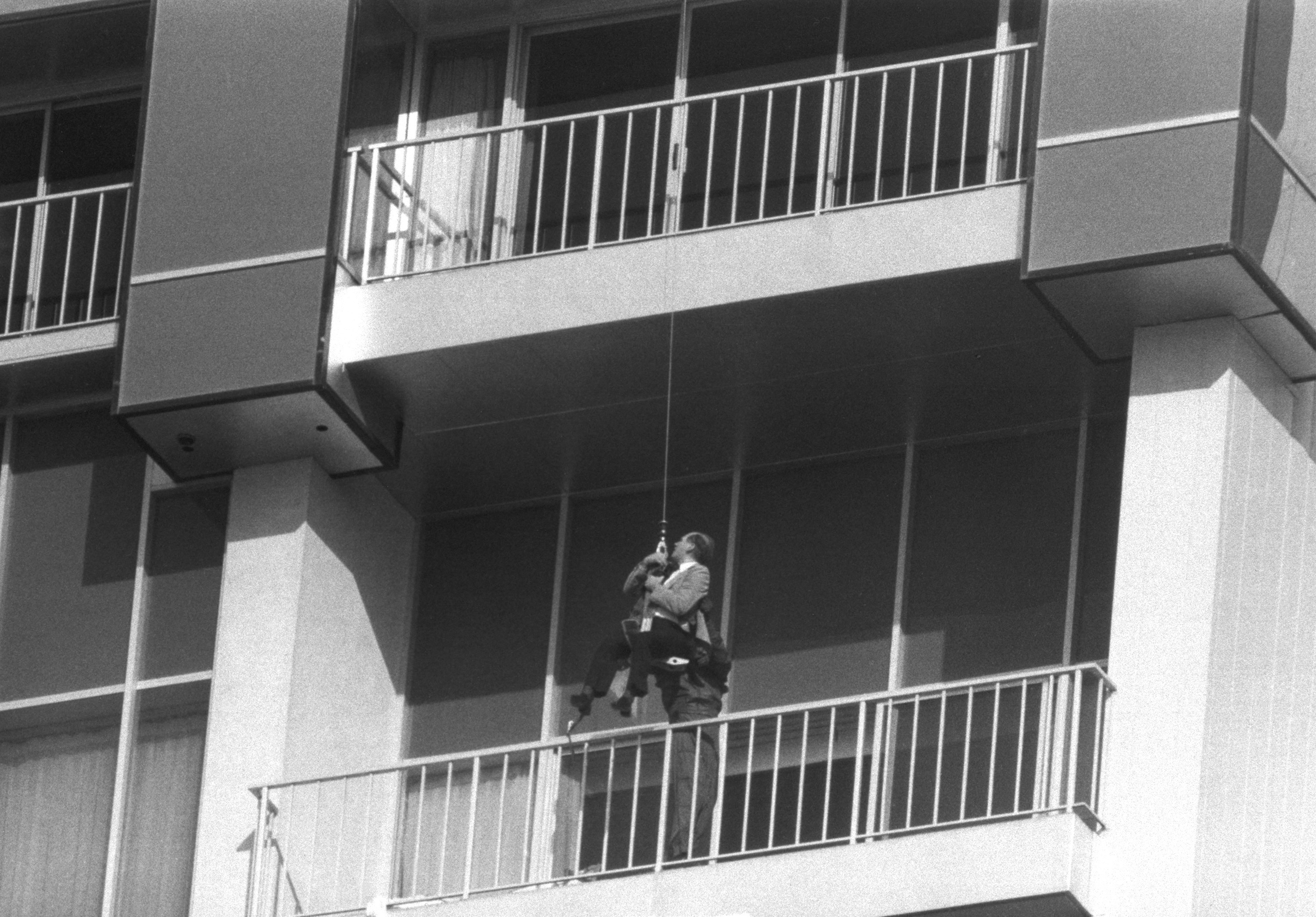
Survivors were evacuated by helicopter.

The fire was limited to the first floor, but the burning material created toxic fumes and smoke, which ascended throughout the hotel tower via vertical shafts (elevators and stairwells) and seismic joints, causing the majority of the deaths. Approximately 350 firefighters responded to the fire, and some reported having to crawl through the dark and over "mounds of stuff" trying to extinguish the fire. It was later determined that the "mounds" were deceased guests and staff near an elevator bank. The Las Vegas fire department operated separately from the county fire department; the latter served the Las Vegas Strip, so city firefighters were unfamiliar with the MGM's layout, including fire escape routes. This hindered the rescue effort.

Proper evacuation of the hotel guests was also hindered as there was no automatic means of returning elevators to the main floor during a fire, causing 10 deceased victims to be found in an elevator. Some hotel guests tied bedsheets together and hung them on balconies to alert first responders. Some tried using the bedsheets to descend the hotel's exterior. Fire ladders could only reach the ninth-floor exterior. One man escaped the hotel tower by lowering himself down a rope.

Some people, trapped in their hotel rooms, broke open their windows to get fresh air, although this allowed thicker smoke from outside to enter the rooms. People below had to dodge shards of glass falling from the broken hotel windows. An expansion of the MGM was underway at the time, and a construction worker used a scaffolding platform to lower guests to the ground, after they escaped through their hotel room windows. The Barbary Coast casino across the street was set up as an evacuation center for MGM guests.

=== Victims ===
Survivors include Donn Arden, Margaret Kelly and German comedian Otto Waalkes. A total of 85 people were killed, including 78 guests and 7 employees. Seventy-five people died from smoke inhalation and carbon monoxide poisoning; four from smoke inhalation alone; three from burns and smoke inhalation; one from burns alone; one of myocarditis; and one from massive skull trauma caused by a fall while attempting to escape the fire.

While the fire primarily damaged the casino floor, approximately 64 deaths occurred on the upper levels of the hotel (mostly from the 20th to 25th floors), where the smoke concentration was the highest. One young couple died in their sleep. Two refrigerated semi-trailers were set up as temporary morgues to hold the bodies of victims until they could be identified.

The number of injuries was reported as being around 600 or more than 700. Approximately 35 firefighters sought medical care, and 15 of them were hospitalized for periods ranging from one day to two weeks. Between 200 and 300 firefighters also experienced dizziness, headaches, and rhinitis in the days after the fire, but did not seek medical attention.

== Cause ==
The fire was confined to the casino and restaurant areas. The hotel lacked a fire sprinkler system. The area with the most fire prevention was in the money-counting area, not in individual rooms or on the casino floor. The county's fire chief had been concerned that such a fire could occur, as older hotels built before 1979 were not required to have certain fire safety features. Nevada governor Robert List said, "You can't force people to bring hotels up to codes that didn't exist when they were built." For years after its opening, the resort declined orders to install a second fire hose in one of its showrooms. As of June 1980, only 20 percent of fire safety violations – discovered two months earlier by inspectors – had been corrected.

=== Electric fire ===
The fire was caused by an electrical ground fault inside a wall-mounted electrical appliance.

A refrigerated pastry display case was added, after original construction of the hotel, to one of its restaurants (known as The Deli). Unlike typical refrigerated display case which are totally self-contained (compressor installed in bottom of display case), this unit had a remote condenser with a pair of copper refrigerant lines connecting its evaporator to a condensing unit located outside the building, functioning like a walk-in cooler or central air conditioning system. When this setup was installed, the copper lines were run through the same wall space as a pre-existing aluminum electrical conduit, in physical contact with each other.

The fan-forced evaporator unit in the display case was not properly secured and thus vibrated constantly during operation; these vibrations were carried along the copper lines, causing the lines to rub against the aluminum conduit in the wall space and making the conduit vibrate as well. The contact between the copper and aluminum caused galvanic corrosion, which eroded the conduit over time. Galvanic corrosion and vibration – as well as jagged edges and stretched wires resulting from poor workmanship during installation – eventually led to the electrical wires inside the conduit losing chunks of their plastic insulation. The conduit was rendered un-grounded because there was no separate ground wire; the metal conduit itself was designed to function as the ground, so the disintegration of the conduit rendered the system un-grounded.

These now-bare electrical wires inside the un-grounded conduit short-circuited, glowed red-hot, and began arcing, which ignited the fire. The fire smoldered for hours until it found fresh oxygen and burst into a fireball that spread into the casino, where it was fed by additional combustibles.

=== Spread of smoke ===
Due to faulty smoke dampers within the ventilation duct network, the toxic fumes circulated throughout the hotel's air conditioning system, accelerating the spread of the poisonous gases. The continued operation of the resort's ventilation system contributed to the fire's harmful effect. On the casino floor, there was no outlet for the smoke, which was spread into the hotel tower by the ventilation system. Smoke rapidly filled the resort's telephone switchboard room, and operators there only had enough time to warn people on the casino floor. Hotel guests were not notified of the fire, as the switchboard operators had to evacuate. The elevator shafts were located above the restaurant and casino, which also helped the smoke to spread. Guests, who earlier had found that the fire doors in some stairwells locked automatically, had propped them open for convenience. However, this allowed more smoke to spread.

== Sprinkler rule exceptions ==
Sprinklers were located on the first two floors and the top floor of the resort. The casino and restaurants were not protected by a fire sprinkler system because they were exempt from rules requiring sprinklers in areas occupied 24 hours a day. A Clark County building inspector granted the exemption—despite the opposition of fire marshals—reasoning that a fire would be quickly noticed by occupants and contained with portable fire extinguishers. When the fire started in The Deli restaurant, it was no longer open 24 hours per day; it was closed at the time of the fire. Although some sprinklers were in the resort, none were located near the fire. A full sprinkler system would have cost $192,000. Because of the cost, MGM installed only the minimum number of sprinklers required by the building code at the time of the resort's construction.

== Aftermath ==
The resort was temporarily closed because of the fire. Much of the damage occurred in the casino, which was charred by the fire. The hotel hallways and stairwells were stained by soot and smoke. Shortly after the fire, some people looted jewelry and blackened money from the resort. State gaming revenues were hurt by the MGM's closure, as the resort was one of the largest tax contributors to the local gaming industry. The county lost an estimated $1.7 million ($5.75 million in 2023) from the closure, and it was estimated that MGM Grand Hotels could face a $1 billion loss because of the fire.

After the fire, the MGM Grand was rebuilt over the next eight months for $50 million. It reopened in July 1981, with numerous fire safety features now in place, including the addition of fire sprinklers and an automatic fire alarm system throughout the property. A two-unit computer – one of them a backup – was provided by Johnson Controls to monitor hundreds of locations throughout the MGM, helping to prevent another fire. A similar computer had also been installed at another MGM Grand hotel in Reno, Nevada. The Las Vegas MGM now had more than 30,000 sprinklers, including four in most hotel rooms. The hotel also had 8,000 speakers, including one in each room, allowing for fire safety instructions to be provided to guests in the event of a fire.

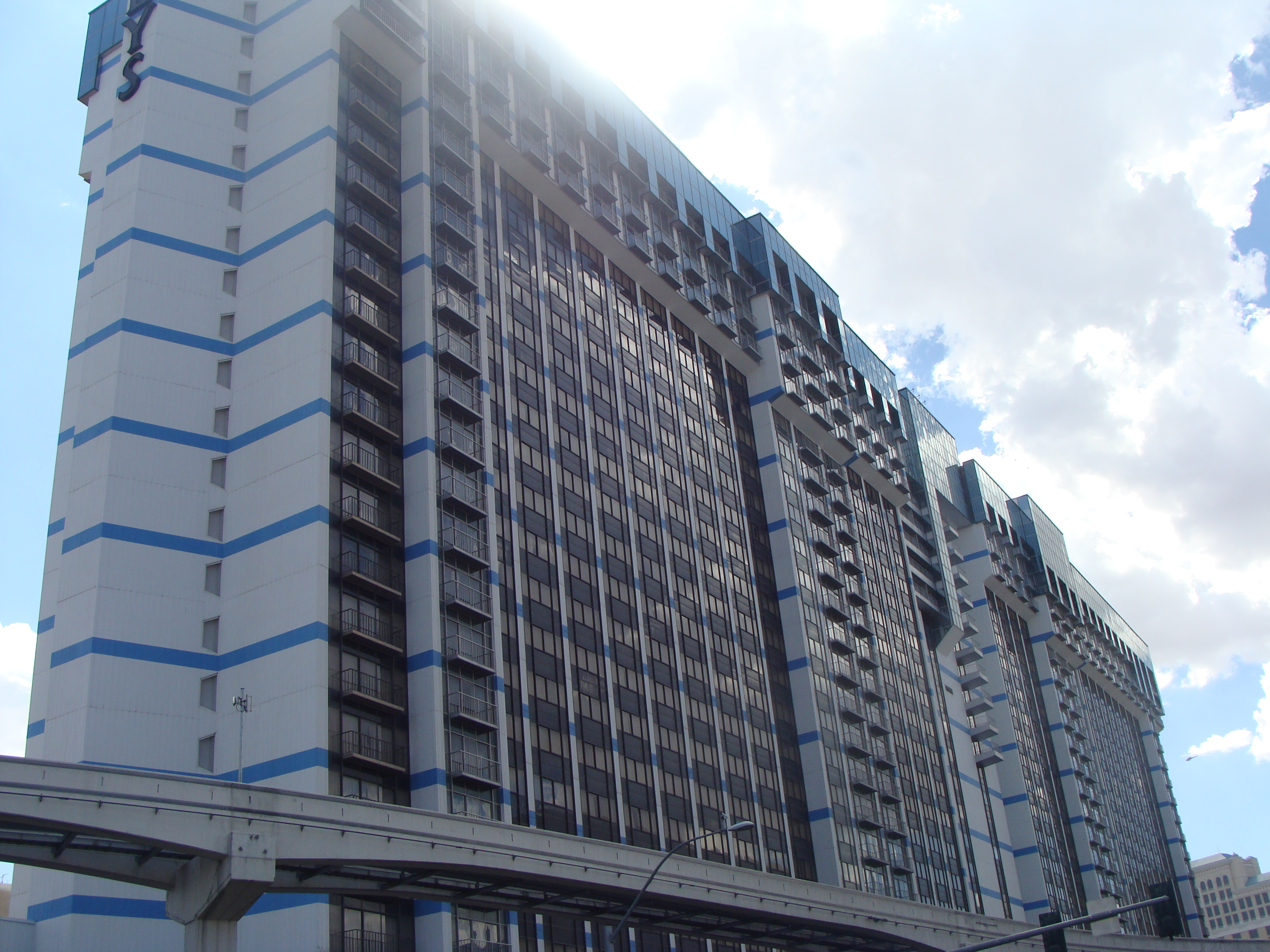
The original MGM tower, seen in 2008 as part of Bally's

The air-conditioning system was heavily modified to prevent smoke from entering hotel rooms, and large exhaust fans were installed, capable of clearing the hotel of fumes in 10 minutes. Plastic pipes and wires that contributed to the fire were removed. A five-minute fire safety program, hosted by Gene Kelly in both English and Spanish, was played on televisions in hotel rooms. Resort officials believed that the MGM was now the safest hotel in the world. A minor incident occurred two weeks after the reopening, and the new safety features worked as planned. Insulation material had begun to smolder because of a welder's torch, and this set off automatic alarms.

The original hotel tower, where most of the deaths occurred, continues to operate. A second tower opened in 1981. The MGM Grand was sold in 1986 to Bally Manufacturing, which changed the name to Bally's Las Vegas. A new MGM Grand was opened in Las Vegas in 1993, at the northeast corner of Las Vegas Boulevard and Tropicana Avenue, south of the original MGM. Bally's was again renamed in 2022, as Horseshoe Las Vegas.

=== Code changes ===
Within a week of the fire, Governor List formed a commission to determine whether older hotels in the state should be required to adopt newer fire safety rules. On February 10, 1981, just 81 days after the MGM fire, another fire broke out at the Las Vegas Hilton, killing eight people. Due to the two incidents, there was a major reformation of fire safety guidelines and codes. All buildings open to the public in Nevada were required to have fire sprinklers, smoke detectors in rooms and elevators, and exit maps in all hotel rooms. This law went into effect in 1981, making Nevada a leader in fire safety regulation. It took several years for all buildings to be in compliance.

=== Lawsuits ===
More than 1,350 legal claims were filed as a result of the fire, and most law firms in the Las Vegas Valley were occupied with these cases. Hundreds of lawsuits were filed against MGM, seeking more than $2 billion in damages. One attorney, representing three local couples against MGM, expressed concern about the reopening, saying that the resort still had defects which could prove harmful in the event of another fire. MGM made numerous settlement deals with the victims in 1983, and a $76 million settlement between MGM and insurance companies was made in 1985. In 1998, there was $440,000 left over in the MGM victim settlement. The remaining money was donated to Clark County victims of fires and burns.

== See also ==
- List of hotel fires in the United States
- Skyscraper fire
- Alpine Motel Apartments fire
- Winecoff Hotel fire
