= Alpine Motel Apartments fire =

2019 building fire in Las Vegas, Nevada

- Date: December 21, 2019
- Location: Alpine Motel Apartments, Las Vegas, Nevada; 36.169153°N 115.135390°W
- Cause: Stove fire
- Deaths: 6
- Injuries: 13
- Property damage: $475,000
- Displaced: 30-75

The Alpine Motel Apartments fire occurred in downtown Las Vegas, Nevada, on December 21, 2019. The three-story building, constructed in 1972, had failed several fire inspections and received numerous code enforcement complaints in the years prior to the fire. Some residents did not have working heaters and were using their kitchen stoves for warmth, which led to the fire. It killed six residents and injured 13 others. It is the deadliest fire to occur in Las Vegas city limits. As a result, the city increased its inspections of older apartment buildings.

Adolfo Orozco purchased the building in 2013, and criminal charges were filed against him and associate Malinda Mier in July 2020, accusing them of involuntary manslaughter and negligence. A preliminary hearing began in August 2020, and eventually concluded in May 2023. All charges against Mier were dismissed, while Orozco was ordered to stand trial. He ultimately took a plea deal in January 2025. Various civil lawsuits were also filed against Orozco, before being settled in March 2023.

In 2021, the Alpine was sold to a partnership of companies which reopened it in 2023, as studio apartments under the name DLUX Lofts.

== Background ==
The Alpine Motel Apartments building is located on 0.16 acres, at 213 North Ninth Street in downtown Las Vegas. The three-story building was constructed in 1972, originally as a motel. It is an inner-hallway structure, with apartment units accessed from central interior hallways on each floor.

At the time of the fire, the structure contained 41 units, 39 of which were occupied. It was owned, at that time, by 43-year-old Adolfo Orozco, also known as Adolfo Orozco-Garcia. Malinda Mier, an associate of Orozco, also claimed to be a co-owner of the building. Mier, who ran a property management company for Orozco, did not own an actual interest in the Alpine.

Orozco worked as a second-grade teacher in California starting in 1998. He began buying real estate in the Las Vegas Valley in 2004, and purchased the Alpine for $805,000 in 2013. He resigned his teaching job that year and moved to Las Vegas. Orozco owned the Alpine and several small motels through his company, Las Vegas Dragon Hotel LLC.

For several years prior to the fire, the Las Vegas Metropolitan Police Department had tried to shut down the Alpine over drug and gang activity occurring on-site. A local ordinance allows the city to board up any building that is considered a long-term nuisance. City officials did not believe that the Alpine qualified, despite more than 150 police calls to the property dating to 2016. Police were often called in to deal with thefts, assaults, and shootings. A city spokesman said, "In this case, and at that time, the issues that Metro was concerned about related to the property were criminal in nature, not issues related to property maintenance or building or zoning code violations. While our chronic nuisance ordinance allows action for repeated criminal activity, evidence must be presented and the property owner must have an opportunity to remedy the situation".

=== Structural safety ===
The building did not have a sprinkler system. Local buildings are only required to follow the fire safety rules that were in place at the time of their construction. From October 2006 until Orozco's purchase, the Alpine had passed six of nine fire code inspections. From 2013 to 2017, it failed 11 of 14 inspections. The last annual fire inspection took place in April 2017, and the case was referred to a team focusing on the safety of low-income apartment complexes. However, the Alpine did not qualify, as it was licensed by the city as a residence hotel rather than an apartment complex. The Southern Nevada Health District considered it a private residence. The discrepancy in labels possibly caused confusion as to which agency would be responsible for building inspections.

By April 2019, Orozco and his motel properties were being investigated by the United States Department of Homeland Security. The agency was looking into drugs and money laundering connected to the Mexican Mafia. City officials were advised to avoid Orozco's properties. It is unclear if this contributed to the lack of fire inspections in the two years prior to the fire.

In addition to the failed fire inspections, the building had also received numerous code enforcement complaints between 2016 and 2018, which included a lack of fire safety equipment. However, such complaints were common among older buildings, and issues at the Alpine were generally resolved swiftly. There were no active code violation investigations at the time of the fire.

Residents had complained of poor living conditions, including bug infestations and plumbing leaks. Each apartment had its own air-conditioning and heating unit, as the overall building lacked central heating. At the time of the fire, at least 15 residents did not have working heaters and were using their kitchen stoves for warmth. The building had at least 14 defective smoke detectors. Residents at Orozco's other motel properties had also complained of poor conditions, and the motels had been cited for health and fire code violations.

=== Fire alarm ===
The building's fire alarm system had been activated, for unknown reasons, on November 28, 2019, about three weeks before the fire. It was silenced shortly thereafter, but remained active. It is unknown who activated and silenced the alarm. EDS Electronics Inc., the company responsible for monitoring the alarm, attempted to reach an emergency contact immediately after the alarm was activated. The contact, Orozco's brother-in-law, could not be reached, and the company dispatched a guard who investigated the building and found no fire.

EDS informed Orozco of the guard's visit via email, but did not specify the activated alarm system, and he never replied. EDS informed the Las Vegas Fire Communications Center about the activated alarm, but the agency did not relay the information to Las Vegas Fire & Rescue, whose fire prevention division is responsible for inspections. The lack of 911 calls suggested that there was no fire at the building. Because false alarms are common, the department's policy is to not send out crews to unconfirmed fires reported by alarm companies. Orozco's attorneys later suggested that the alarm was pulled as a prank.

== Fire ==
The two-alarm fire began on the morning of December 21, 2019, originating from a kitchen stove in apartment unit 8 on the first floor. The resident of the unit survived the fire and later said he could not remember if he left any flammable materials on his stove. He had left the unit for approximately 20 minutes to withdraw money from a nearby ATM, and the fire had already begun upon his return.

The first 911 call was placed at 4:13 a.m., and firefighters began arriving four minutes later. Some smoke detectors worked, but the fire alarms did not sound off at all, and residents were instead alerted of the fire by each other. One victim, a resident who served as the building's maintenance worker, was credited for pounding on doors to wake up other residents.

A door leading to the rooftop had been bolted shut, preventing an escape for some upper-floor residents who were fleeing from smoke. The only other exits were a front and back door, the latter of which had been bolted shut due to repeated break-ins by homeless people. Orozco was aware of the faulty back door for months, but declined to have it replaced because of the cost. Some residents had to climb down or jump from their apartment windows, in order to escape smoke. A pregnant woman fell from her third-story window after trying to climb down using a bedsheet. The first-floor hallway included several old refrigerators and a vending machine, partially obstructing the escape route for residents.

The fire caused an estimated $475,000 in damages. It was put out within five minutes, and was largely contained to the unit in which it started.

== Victims ==
The fire killed six residents, including three inside; the others died after escaping the building. The victims ranged in age from 46 to 72 years old. The fire injured 13 others. Most of the injuries consisted of smoke inhalation, although some suffered fractures after jumping from their windows. Two cats and a dog also died in the fire, while one dog was rescued by animal control.

It was the deadliest fire to occur in city limits. Three previous fires had each held the record number of deaths, which was three. The MGM Grand fire (1980) killed 87 people, but it occurred on the Las Vegas Strip, which is outside of city limits.

Between 30 and 35 people were initially displaced due to the fire, and were assisted by the American Red Cross. Later reports placed the number of displaced residents as high as 75. The city and county both worked to provide temporary assistance to 13 households, consisting of 24 people. Orozco also paid to house 37 displaced residents at his other motel properties.

== Investigation ==
Hours after the fire, Mier said that the building was up to code: "We have the fire inspection people come out and test the fire alarm systems, we have code enforcement come and go through the buildings. We do everything we can to make sure everyone is safe". Orozco had lived a private life up to the time of the fire, and he never spoke to the media about the incident, although his attorney said, "On a personal level, he's taking it pretty hard". The Nevada state fire marshal launched an investigation into possible code violations at the building, probing each room. A criminal investigation by the Las Vegas Metropolitan Police Department was also underway, and Orozco hired an attorney to defend him against any potential charges.

In the days after the incident, inspectors initially found 42 fire code violations. An engineer with the National Fire Protection Association was present during the inspection and considered the list of violations to be among the worst in his career, saying it was fortunate that only six people died. An inspection report was released on January 7, 2020, citing the building for 16 fire code violations. One week later, investigators seized a computer and paperwork from the manager's office, as well as other items from the apartment of the maintenance man who died. Criminal investigators also seized a cellphone belonging to Orozco. His attorney objected to the seizure, but was denied by a judge who found it to be an appropriate measure during the investigation.

For its investigative coverage of the fire and its effects, the Las Vegas Review-Journal would go on to win numerous awards, from organizations such as the Society of Professional Journalists and the Nevada Press Association.

== Legal ==
=== Criminal charges ===
On July 30, 2020, prosecutors filed various criminal charges against Orozco and Mier, including one count of involuntary manslaughter for each of the six victims, and 15 counts of "performance of an act or neglect of duty in disregard of safety resulting in substantial bodily harm or death". Among these was the failure to provide heating and proper fire precautions.

Orozco also faced four charges over attempts to dissuade witnesses – live-in property manager Jason Casteel and his fiancé – from cooperating with the investigation. Orozco had allegedly threatened them with an assault rifle, and had offered them money to leave town. These two charges were denied by Orozco's attorney, who said Casteel and his fiancé were not being truthful. Orozco's attorney suggested that Casteel should be the one held responsible for the deaths. Mier, meanwhile, said she took full responsibility for the negligence leading up to the fire.

Orozco's bail was set at $50,000, and Mier's at $10,000. Both were required to surrender their passports and refrain from contact with victims and witnesses of the fire. In addition, Orozco was ordered to hire a management company to oversee his other properties. Orozco and Mier posted bail, and a preliminary hearing began on August 18, 2020. The hearing was originally expected to conclude at the end of the month. However, it ran unusually long due to the complexity of the case and because of the COVID-19 pandemic and its effects in the state, causing a disruption in the court schedule.

In late 2020, defense investigator Don Dibble declined to answer questions about an interview he had conducted with Mier "in which she essentially confessed to her involvement in the crimes charged". Dibble was held in contempt of court, and Orozco's attorney appealed this decision, thus postponing the preliminary hearing. The matter eventually went to the Supreme Court of Nevada, which reaffirmed the contempt finding in December 2022. The preliminary hearing resumed two months later.

Prosecutors amended the criminal complaint in April 2023, accusing Orozco of hiring unlicensed or unqualified workers to maintain the building's safety, and failing to follow up on tenant and staff concerns regarding its safety. The following month, a judge ruled there was enough evidence for Orozco to stand trial. All charges against Mier were dismissed. Orozco pled not guilty to 27 criminal charges. His defense attorney requested that the six involuntary manslaughter charges be dismissed, stating that Nevada had never brought such charges against someone in the case of an accidental fire. A judge declined to dismiss the charges in November 2023, stating they were based on Orozco's failure to maintain a safe structure. A jury trial was scheduled to begin on February 10, 2025. Orozco later agreed to take an Alford plea and avoid trial, about three weeks before its scheduled start. He was sentence to 19-48 months in prison on June 3, 2025.

=== Lawsuits ===
A relative of one of the victims filed a wrongful death lawsuit against Orozco on January 8, 2020. Two families filed separate lawsuits the following month, on behalf of other victims. They accused Orozco of neglecting the building to the point of being unsafe.

In May 2020, a lawsuit was filed against Orozco and several fire alarm companies on behalf of 43 residents. The suit accused the companies of negligence in the installation and monitoring of the building's fire alarms. It stated that Orozco and the companies should have been aware of the poor living conditions and the faulty equipment.

Six months after the fire, one man remained hospitalized with severe burns and brain injuries. His public guardian filed a lawsuit against Orozco, alleging negligence and seeking more than $15,000. In March 2021, two more families filed wrongful death lawsuits against Orozco and several security alarm companies. The civil cases had been consolidated by mid-2021.

In November 2021, Orozco's attorneys filed a lawsuit against several entities and individuals, alleging them to be more directly responsible for the fire. Among the defendants was EDS and the city of Las Vegas, with the suit stating that they never informed Orozco of the activated alarm system. The suit also named the resident whose stove started the fire, alleging that he never informed Alpine management of problems with his heater. The suit stated that the resident "knew or reasonably should have known that he had highly flammable materials on or in close proximity to the stove and/or oven at the time he left Unit 108".

The suit also named Casteel, stating that he failed to deliver new heaters to residents and instead told them to use their stoves for warmth. In addition, the suit claimed that Casteel was the one who deactivated the fire alarm, stating that he failed to reset it properly thus leading to its audio failure on the day of the fire. Orozco's suit also accused Casteel of bolting the rear door shut rather than repairing it, and claimed that he left the refrigerators in the ground-floor hallway rather than moving them into Orozco's office as instructed.

As of December 2022, there had been 15 lawsuits consolidated to a single case. It named nearly 20 defendants, including Orozco, his wife, and companies involved with the Alpine Motel's fire alarm system. A confidential settlement was reached in March 2023, and was approved by a judge the following month.

== Building status ==
After the fire, the building was ordered to remain vacant of residents until repair work was conducted. While police and fire crews collected evidence from the property, former residents were upset at having to wait months to retrieve their belongings. The building was burglarized several times in February 2020, sparking concerns among residents about their items. As a result of the fire and subsequent investigation, much of the building was contaminated with asbestos, causing $9,000 worth of clean-up. Orozco agreed to pay for the cost of cleaning salvageable property. Residents were eventually allowed to retrieve their belongings in June 2020. Within two months, Orozco had put the Alpine up for sale, with an asking price of $3.3 million. By October 2020, the building had been broken into several times by homeless people, despite repeated efforts to keep it boarded up.

In August 2021, the Alpine and its parking lot were sold for $1.9 million to a partnership of companies: DLUX Investments, owned by Henderson, Nevada resident John Burnette; Apogee Capital Holdings, based in Las Vegas; and Ambleside Properties, based in Canada. In December 2021, plans were announced to modernize the structure as studio apartments under the name DLUX Lofts. Burnette's plans included a fire sprinkler system and new flooring, roofing, and windows. A façade mural was also planned, as a memorial to the fire victims. The renovation project cost $3 million, and included the complete gutting of the building, as well as asbestos removal. Renovations were completed by May 2023, and the finished building includes 42 units.

== Effect on other properties ==
A month after the fire, Clark County officials began collecting information on apartment complexes in the area and taking note of those that were lacking fire sprinklers and smoke alarms. The most vulnerable properties would be inspected within the next four months. In February 2020, the Las Vegas city planning department proposed the Multifamily Residential Rental Registry and Inspection Program. It would mandate building inspections every five years and require the registration of 64,000 multifamily residential units, including hotels, motels, and fourplexes. Prior to that point, inspections were usually only carried out in response to complaints. The city estimated that 78 percent (or approximately 50,000) of the units were built prior to 1993, when fire sprinklers were mandated.

In September 2020, the city passed reforms for increased inspections and fines at apartment properties with poor living conditions. A city program was eventually passed in April 2021, requiring inspections at least once a year on apartment properties built prior to 1981. The program would focus on apartments that had been built as motels and hotels before being converted. By the end of 2022, more than 1,000 units had been inspected across 33 properties.
