= Nevada State Fairgrounds =

Exposition center in Reno, Nevada

The Nevada State Fairgrounds (formerly known as the Reno Livestock Events Center and the Reno-Sparks Livestock Events Center) is an exhibition center and rodeo venue, located in Reno, Nevada. The site is home to two annual events, the Reno Rodeo and the State Fair of Nevada. The site was first endowed to the Nevada Department of Agriculture in 1867. In 2026, the property was transferred to the state by the Reno-Sparks Convention and Visitors Authority Board, with the Board paying $10 million to the state as part of the transfer agreement. The Reno Rodeo Association has managed the facility since July 2026.

== Facilities ==
The fairgrounds site includes numerous buildings designed for use by the Reno Rodeo, including two outdoor rodeo arenas, two indoor arenas, a livestock pavilion and animal stalls.

In 2022, plans were announced for a "revitalization project", an earlier proposal of which came in 2018, with the Reno Rodeo Association seeking funding sources for a proposed renovation. Infrastructure upgrades would begin in September 2025. The Fairgrounds have been used as a evacuation site for animals during wildfires, including in August 2026, when it housed nearly 300 animals displaced by the Bug Fire, including horses and goats.

=== Indoor Arena ===
Nevada State Fairgrounds Indoor Arena
- Interactive map of Nevada State Fairgrounds Indoor Arena
- Former names: Reno Livestock Events Center; Reno-Sparks Livestock Events Center
- Address: 1350 North Wells Avenue
- Location: Reno, Nevada, U.S.
- Coordinates: 39°32′33″N 119°48′6″W
- Owner: Nevada Department of Agriculture
- Operator: Reno Rodeo Association
- Capacity: 6,200

Construction
- Cost: $5.9 million
- Architect: Don Mackey Architects
- Main contractor: Clark/Sullivan

The Nevada State Fairgrounds Indoor Arena is a 6,200-seat multipurpose arena located on the site. The building, constructed in under six months and featuring 300-foot clear span trusses, as well as a 150-by-300-foot dirt floor space, hosts events as part of the Reno Rodeo, as well as concerts, motorsports events (including an annual Monster Jam show), track meets and conventions. It has also hosted the annual National Pole Vault Summit.

Among the musical acts to have performed in the indoor arena include metal band Tool, who performed at the then-Reno Livestock Events Center on August 19, 1998, as part of their Ænima tour.

== See also ==
- Reno-Sparks Convention Center
