= Nevada Capitol Police =

- Abbreviation: NCPD

Agency overview
- Formed: 1985
- Preceding agencies: Division of Buildings and Grounds; Capitol Security
- Employees: 27

Jurisdictional structure
- Operations jurisdiction: Nevada, USA
- General nature: Civilian police

Operational structure
- Headquarters: Carson City, Nevada
- Police Officers: 27
- Agency executive: John Letos, Chief of Police
- Parent agency: Nevada Department of Public Safety

Website
- Nevada Capitol Police

Nevada Capitol Police is a division of the Nevada Department of Public Safety that is responsible for law enforcement in major state buildings within Nevada. It also provides security for senior government officials. Policing and security for the Nevada Legislature is provided by the separate Nevada State Legislative Police.

The Nevada Capitol Police was organized in the late 1940s as the security detail of the Nevada Division of Buildings and Grounds, with one night watchman patrolling the perimeter of the Nevada State Capitol Complex (including the Governor's Mansion), using any available Buildings and Grounds vehicle to deter crime, sometimes with the assistance of the then-Ormsby County Sheriff and Carson City Police Departments.

In 1966, the night watch crew had grown to three officers, and the department was renamed "Capitol Security". In 1972, the Nevada Legislature reorganized its status as "limited peace officers", meaning that they were not recognized as fully sworn peace officers under the Nevada Revised Statutes at the time. In 1985, this status was elevated to "official sworn peace officer", meaning that they were now in the same league as the Nevada Highway Patrol, Las Vegas Metropolitan Police Department, Reno Police and the reorganized Carson City Sheriff's Office.

There have been eight Chiefs of the Nevada Capitol Police since its current status was established in 1985. Brad Valladon was the Chief from November 2001. He was succeeded by Pat Conmay in June 2009, Jay Logue in January 2010, Thomas Navin in 2012 and the current Chief, Jerome Tushbant, in March 2013.

In 2014, the state settled a lawsuit brought by a former member of the Capitol Police, who said she had been discriminated against on the grounds of sex and age. One officer was dismissed, and another four disciplined.

== See also ==
- List of law enforcement agencies in Nevada
- Capitol police
