= Nevada State (disambiguation) =

Nevada State commonly refers to Nevada State University, a university in Henderson, Nevada founded in 2002 and formerly known as Nevada State College.

Nevada State may also refer to:

- University of Nevada, Reno, known as Nevada State University from 1881 to 1906.
- Nevada, a U.S. State

== See also ==
- University of Nevada, Las Vegas
- Nevada State Police
- List of state routes in Nevada
