= Las Vegas Fire & Rescue =

Fire department in Nevada, United States

Coordinates: 36.175229°N 115.140604°W

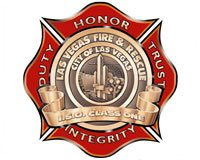

Operational area
- Country: United States
- State: Nevada
- City: Las Vegas

Agency overview
- Established: 1942
- Annual calls: 95,829 (2020) (daily average 262.5)
- Employees: 705 (2020)
- Annual budget: $131,470,833 (2020)
- Staffing: Career
- Fire chief: Fernando Gray
- EMS level: ALS
- IAFF: 1285
- Motto: Striving for a safer community

Facilities and equipment
- Battalions: 3
- Stations: 21
- Engines: 22
- Trucks: 6
- Rescues: 25
- Tenders: 1
- HAZMAT: 1
- Light and air: 1

Website
- Official website
- IAFF website

The Las Vegas Fire & Rescue is the fire department and emergency medical services provider for the city of Las Vegas in the U.S. state of Nevada. It is the second largest fire department in the state of Nevada after the Clark County Fire Department. The Las Vegas Fire & Rescue department is responsible for preserving life and property for a population over 600,000 in an area totaling 133.25 square miles (345.1 km^{2}). Since 2009, the LVFRD has been one of only 9 fire departments in the United States that is accredited by both the Insurance Services Office (ISO) and the Commission on Fire Accreditation International (CFAI).

== History ==
The department began in 1906 as a volunteer department. In August 1942, the department added its first full-time employees, a chief and 12 firefighters.

In 1999, a city ordinance changed the name of the department from Las Vegas Fire Department to Las Vegas Fire & Rescue.

In early 2013, the department dismissed 12 firefighter recruits after an investigation found irregularities during a hazardous materials examination at the training academy. The dismissals occurred one day before graduation and were later characterized by city officials and the Nevada Employee-Management Relations Board as the most serious cheating incident in the department’s history.

Investigators concluded that one recruit admitted to exchanging answers and that the remaining recruits engaged in related misconduct. All were probationary employees at the time. The recruits appealed their termination to the EMRB, alleging violations of the collective bargaining agreement with the International Association of Fire Fighters, Local 1285. In December 2014, the EMRB ruled that probationary recruits were at-will employees not entitled to union protections and upheld the city’s actions.

The ruling did not require reinstatement or back pay, nor repayment of training costs estimated at $719,000. Following the incident, the city dismissed the training officer involved and implemented additional examination oversight measures, including the use of outside proctors.

== MGM Grand fire ==
On November 21, 1980, Las Vegas Fire & Rescue mobilized as a supporting agency to assist the Clark County Fire Department, which maintained primary authority over the incident due to the hotel's location in the unincorporated town of Paradise. The department joined a 350 personnel response from across the valley, working with units from North Las Vegas and Henderson.

== Stations and equipment ==
LVFRD Fire Station # 5

LVFRD Fire Station # 7

The department is currently made up of over 705 employees 22 fire stations, located throughout the city under the command of three battalion chiefs in three battalions each shift.

Station number	Address	Engine company	Truck company	EMS response unit	Other units
1	500 N. Casino Center Blvd	Engine 1, Engine 201	Truck 1	Rescue 1, Rescue 201, Rescue 301	Battalion 1
2	900 S. Durango Dr	Engine 2		Rescue 2	Battalion 10
3	2645 W. Washington Ave	Engine 3		Rescue 3	Hazmat 3, CBRN3, Air Resource 3
4	421 S. 15th St	Engine 4		ILS 4, Rescue 4, Rescue 204	
5	1020 Hinson St	Engine 5		Rescue 5, EMS 1	
6	1680 S. Torrey Pines Dr	Engine 6	Truck 6	Rescue 6	
7	10101 Banburry Cross Dr		Truck 7	Rescue 7	Mobile Command Unit
8	805 N. Mojave Rd	Engine 8	Truck 8	Rescue 8	
9	4747 N. Rainbow Blvd	Engine 9		Rescue 9	Water Tender 9
10	1501 S. Martin L. King Blvd	Engine 10		Rescue 10	
41	6989 N. Buffalo Dr	Engine 41		Rescue 41	
42	7331 W. Cheyenne Ave	Engine 42		Rescue 42	Battalion 4
43	6420 Smoke Ranch Rd	Engine 43	Truck 43	Rescue 43	
44	7701 W. Washington Ave	Engine 44		Rescue 44	Heavy Rescue 44
45	3821 N. Fort Apache Rd	Engine 45		Rescue 45	
46	9945 N Grand Canyon Dr	Engine 46		Rescue 46	
47	911 N Ridge Pine St	Engine 47		Rescue 47	
48	9133 W. Elkhorn Rd	Engine 48	Truck 48	Rescue 48	
103	190 Upland Blvd	Engine 103		Rescue 103	
106	1888 Stella Lake St	Engine 106		Rescue 106	
107	9398 Sundial Dr	Engine 107		Rescue 107	
108	4555 E. Bonanza Rd	Engine 108		Rescue 108	

== See also ==
- Las Vegas, Las Vegas Valley, and the Las Vegas Strip
- Clark County Fire Department
- Henderson Fire Department
- North Las Vegas Fire Department
- MGM Grand Fire
