= Davis v. City of Las Vegas =

- Court: United States Court of Appeals for the Ninth Circuit
- Argued: October 19 2006
- Decided: February 28 2007 Full name: CITY OF LAS VEGAS, a political subdivision of the State of Nevada; Las Vegas Metropolitan Police Department, a political subdivision of the State of Nevada; David D. Miller, individually and in his official capacity as a Las Vegas Metropolitan Police Officer; Leonard Marshall, individually and in his official capacity as a Las Vegas Metropolitan Police Officer; Exber, Inc., a Nevada corporation, dba Las Vegas Club; Alfred Libby, individually and in his official capacity as an employee of the Las Vegas Club; Patrick Lapera, individually and in his capacity as Director of Security for the Las Vegas Club; John Orr, individually and in his capacity as an employee of the Las Vegas Club; Richard Mabe, individually and in his capacity as an employee of the Las Vegas Club; Shane Mundell, individually and in his capacity as an employee of the Las Vegas Club, Defendants-Appellees.
- Citation: 478 F.3d 1048 (2007)

Case history
- Prior history: United States District Court for the District of Nevada

Holding
- Police officer not entitled to qualified immunity for "swinging a handcuffed man into a wall head-first multiple times and then punching him in the face while he lay face-down on the ground, and breaking his neck as a result"

Court membership
- Judges sitting: Stephen Reinhardt, Sidney Runyan Thomas, Judges; John T. Noonan, Jr., Senior Judge

Case opinions
- Majority: Reinhardt, joined by Noonan, Thomas

Laws applied
- U.S. Const. amend. IV

Davis v. City of Las Vegas, 478 F.3d 1048 (9th Cir. 2007), was a case in which the United States Court of Appeals for the Ninth Circuit determined whether a Las Vegas, Nevada police officer utilized excessive force when making an arrest.

== Background and Opinion of the Court ==
On November 7, 2001, Frankie Davis was handcuffed by security at the Las Vegas Club Hotel & Casino after he was found in an area of the casino that was not open to the public. When a police officer, David Miller, arrived, Davis refused to consent to a search; at that point, Miller then "slammed [Davis] head-first into a wall several times, pinned him against the floor, and punched him in the face." As a result of these actions, Davis suffered a broken neck.

Recording of oral arguments in the appeal heard by the Ninth Circuit.

Davis filed a lawsuit, arguing that Miller's excessive use of force violated the Fourth Amendment of the United States Constitution, but the officer alleged that he was entitled to qualified immunity. The United States District Court for the District of Nevada granted Miller's motion for summary judgment based on his qualified immunity claim, but on appeal, the Ninth Circuit reversed. In an opinion written by Circuit Judge Stephen Reinhardt, the Court held that Miller was not entitled to qualified immunity because "any reasonable officer" in the same position would have known that "swinging a handcuffed man into a wall head-first multiple times and then punching him in the face while he lay face-down on the ground, and breaking his neck as a result, was unnecessary and excessive."

== Commentary and analysis ==
In its summary of the case, the McQuillin Municipal Law Report stated that the Court "had no question" that the officer was not entitled to qualified immunity. University of Georgia School of Law professor Michael L. Wells argued that in Davis, the Ninth Circuit assumed a role "between judge and jury" by making an independent assessment of the "reasonableness" of the officer's actions. In the Ninth Circuit's 2010 opinion in Luchtel v. Hagemann, the court cited Davis as a case that affirmed the "continuing viability" of circuit precedent that recognized "causing fractures and dislocating shoulders while handcuffing a suspect is excessive force."

== See also ==
- Second Enforcement Act of 1871
