= Nevada Department of Public Safety =

Governmental agency of the US state of Nevada

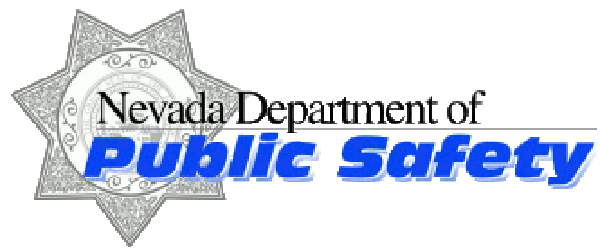
- Logo of the Nevada Department of Public Safety

- Flag
- Abbreviation: NV DPS

Agency overview
- Employees: 1,566.51
- Annual budget: $507,687,637 (2019–2021)

Jurisdictional structure
- Operations jurisdiction: Nevada, USA
- Area: 110,577.82 square miles (286,400 km^{2})
- Population: 3,210,931 (2024)
- Legal jurisdiction: (Nevada) Statewide
- Governing body: Governor of Nevada
- General nature: Military police; Civilian police

Operational structure
- Headquarters: 555 Wright Way Carson City, Nevada
- Director of NV DPS responsible: George Togliatti
- Agency executive: Kristen Defer, Deputy Director

Website
- Nevada DPS website

The Department of Public Safety of the State of Nevada, commonly known as the Nevada Department of Public Safety (DPS), is a department of the state government of Nevada. In 2021, the department began to use the Nevada State Police moniker across social media, agency vehicles and other related material, such as recruiting efforts. However, DPS remains the umbrella name for the department.

The agency is headquartered at 555 Wright Way in Carson City.

== Organization ==
The Director of the Nevada Department of Public Safety is appointed by the Governor of Nevada and must be confirmed by the Nevada Senate. The director is assisted in managing the department by one deputy director and several division directors.

== Divisions ==
DPS is divided into divided eight Divisions and five Offices :

- Office of the Director
- Nevada Capitol Police Division
- Emergency Management Division
- Nevada State Police
- Nevada Investigation Division
- Nevada Parole and Probation
- Records, Communications & Compliance
- Nevada State Fire Marshal
- Nevada Training Division
- Office of Criminal Justice Assistance
- Office of Professional Responsibility
- Office of Traffic Safety
- Office of Cyber Defense Coordination
- Office of Homeland Security

=== Office of the Director ===
The Office of the Director provides administrative support for the Department of Public Safety, provides support services and resources to assist local law enforcement agencies, and provides training criteria and licensing for law enforcement officers. The office also administers the Homeland Security Program and state and federal funds in grants for juvenile justice, victims' assistance, law enforcement, and narcotics control.

=== Nevada Capitol Police ===
The Capitol Police serve as the primary law enforcement agency for the capitol complex, as well as other state buildings in Carson City, patrolling the buildings and grounds 24 hours a day, seven days a week.

=== State Emergency Management Division ===
The State Emergency Management helps Nevadas prepare for, respond to, and recover from disasters, including coordinating state disaster response and working with local, federal, and nongovernmental partners to develop state emergency plans.

=== Nevada State Police ===
The Nevada State Police Division is responsible for law enforcement on state highways and waterways, criminal investigations, criminal laboratory analysis, motor vehicle and commercial vehicle inspections, boat inspections, and public education about safety issues.

=== Nevada Division of Fire Safety ===
The Division of Fire Safety provides training and certification to firefighters and emergency response personnel, investigates fires across the state, and has responsibilities related to the safety of fireworks, elevators, explosives, amusements rides, day care centers, and boilers.

=== Investigation Division ===
The Nevada Investigation Division has dedicated resources to proactively enforce criminal violations throughout the State of Nevada, and focuses its efforts in several areas: major crime investigations, drug enforcement, pharmaceutical diversion, auto theft, and criminal intelligence analysis and homeland security as conducted by the Nevada Threat Analysis Center (NTAC). It carries out enforcement of controlled substance laws, provides investigative services to all criminal justice agencies, and supports law enforcement statewide through the collection and dissemination of criminal and threat information.

=== Office of Cyber Defense Coordination ===
The Office of Cyber Defense Coordination (OCDC) serves as the primary focal point for cyber security strategy, planning, policy, and coordination for the state. The OCDC assists local governments and non-profits within Nevada with work on cybersecurity strategy and defensive techniques, including reporting cybersecurity concerns and working on cyber security projects. The vision of the office is to be the state's primary interagency cybersecurity resource.

== See also ==
- List of law enforcement agencies in Nevada
- Denver S. Dickerson
