= Debra Gauthier =

- Police career
- Country: United States
- Department: Las Vegas Metropolitan Police Department
- Service years: 1980 - 2001
- Rank: Sworn in as Officer, 1980; Patrol officer
- Other work: Non-fiction author

Debra Gauthier is a former Las Vegas Metropolitan Police Department lieutenant who chronicled in a book her 21-year police career as a woman on a predominantly male police force.

== Education ==
Gauthier graduated with a bachelor's degree in fine arts in 1979 and a master's in public administration in 1990 from the University of Nevada, Las Vegas.

== Career ==
She joined the Las Vegas police force in 1980 as the first woman in the department to be placed on street patrol.

In 1986, she arrested Mafia lieutenant Herbert Blitzstein during a multi-agency task force called “Operation Chutzpah.”

She implemented the department's first bicycle patrol unit, which she oversaw as a sergeant. Afterward, in 1994, she was promoted to lieutenant. She appeared as a cast member on Fox's TV series Cops while still a bike patrol sergeant.

Gauthier claimed discrimination against the department while working in what she claimed was a male-dominated environment under unsafe conditions. After she was promoted to lieutenant and passed the captain's test, she was demoted following an internal affairs probe into ethics allegations brought by a subordinate. In 1999, Gauthier was one of four women who held a news conference outside police headquarters claiming discrimination by the department.

While still on the force, Gauthier filed a $1 million suit against her department for discrimination. A federal jury ruled against her in 2002 and dismissed her lawsuit against the department.

In 1999–2000, Gauthier was appointed as a member of the American Bar Association's Judicial Assessment Commission of the Nevada Supreme Court.

In 2002, following a forced retirement after 21 years, Gauthier ran unsuccessfully for the office of sheriff of Clark County. Ms. magazine wrote that one of her campaign platforms was disqualifying police officer candidates with histories of violent behavior.

In August 2013, Gauthier appeared on Pat Robertson's The 700 Club on the Christian Broadcasting Network to discuss her career and her life as a woman working in a male-dominated police force. She was questioned about her known homosexuality.

== Bright Lights, Dark Places ==
In July 2011, a memoir titled Bright Lights, Dark Places: Pioneering As A Female Police Officer In Las Vegas was released by Tate Publishing. The book chronicles Gauthier's career as an officer with the Las Vegas Metropolitan Police Department from 1980 to 2001.

The Las Vegas Review-Journal wrote that "the picture (Gauthier) paints of the Metropolitan Police Department in the book is not a flattering one. She writes that she endured sexual harassment, was intentionally not notified of meetings she was supposed to attend, had her days off changed without notice and was passed over for promotions."

Las Vegas columnist John L. Smith wrote that “former Metro Lt. Debra Gauthier has just published a revealing memoir of her life, police career and spiritual growth.

She was described as a "trail blazer" by BlogTalkRadio for writing the book. She also appeared on the "It's A Crime" show on KCAA-AM 1050 NBC Radio to discuss the book and her career.
