= List of law enforcement agencies in Nevada =

This is a list of law enforcement agencies in the U.S. state of Nevada.

According to the US Bureau of Justice Statistics' 2008 Census of State and Local Law Enforcement Agencies, the state had 76 law enforcement agencies employing 6,643 sworn police officers, about 254 for each 100,000 residents.

== Law enforcement in Nevada ==
The State of Nevada Peace Officers' Standards and Training Commission is responsible to:

- provide for and encourage the training and education of persons whose primary duty is law enforcement to ensure the safety of the residents of and visitors to this state.
- Shall adopt regulations establishing minimum standards for the certification and decertification, recruitment, selection and training of peace officers.

Within Nevada, Peace Officers are grouped into one of three classes, Category I, Category II, or Category III:

- Category I peace officers include traditional law enforcement officers such as Police Officers, Deputy Sheriffs, Deputy Marshals, Parole & Probation Officers, and State Troopers of the Nevada Highway Patrol. The Category I peace officer training is a minimum of 679 hours .
- Category II peace officers are specialists and include officers such as Taxicab Authority Officers, Gaming Control Agents, and Constables. The Category II training is a minimum of 437 hours .
- Category III peace officers are those officers assigned solely to State Corrections & City/County Detention. The Category III training is a minimum of 10 weeks .

== State agencies ==
- Nevada Department of Agriculture
  - Agriculture Enforcement Division
- Nevada Department of Conservation and Natural Resources
  - Division of State Parks
- Nevada Department of Corrections
- Nevada Department of Motor Vehicles
  - Compliance Enforcement Division
- Nevada Department of Public Safety
  - Capitol Police
  - Division of Parole and Probation
  - Nevada Highway Patrol
  - Investigations Division
- Nevada Department of Wildlife
  - Game Division
  - Law Enforcement Division
- Nevada Gaming Control Board
  - Enforcement Division
- Nevada Taxicab Authority
- University Police - Southern Command
- University Police - Northern Command

== County agencies ==
- Churchill County Sheriff's Office
- Clark County District Attorney Investigations
- Clark County Office of Public Safety
- Clark County Public Response Office
- Clark County Marshal's Office (Nevada)
- Clark County Sheriff's Department (Nevada)
- Clark County Department of Juvenile Justice Services
- Douglas County Sheriff's Department
- Elko County Sheriff's Office
- Esmeralda County Sheriff's Office
- Eureka County Sheriff's Office
- Humboldt County Sheriff's Office
- Mineral County Sheriff's Office
- Lander County Sheriff's Office
- Lincoln County Sheriff's Office
- Lyon County Sheriff's Office
- Nye County Sheriff's Office
- Pershing County Sheriff's Office
- Storey County Sheriff's Office
- White Pine County Sheriff's Office
- Washoe County Sheriff's Office

== Joint city-county agencies ==
- Carson City Sheriff's Office
- Las Vegas Metropolitan Police Department

== City agencies ==
- Boulder City Police Department
- Carlin Police Department
- Elko Police Department
- Ely Police Department
- Fallon Police Department
- Henderson Police Department
- Henderson Township Constable's Office
- City of Las Vegas Municipal Court Marshals
- City of Las Vegas Department of Public Safety
- City of Las Vegas Animal Protection Services
- Las Vegas City Marshals
- Lovelock Police Department
- Mesquite Constable
- Mesquite Police Department
- North Las Vegas Constable
- North Las Vegas Police Department
- Reno Police Department
- Sparks Police Department
- West Wendover Police Department
- Winnemucca Police Department
- Yerington Police Department

== Tribal agencies ==
- Duckwater Shoshone Tribe of the Duckwater Reservation
  - Duckwater Tribal Police
- Ely Shoshone Tribe of Nevada
  - Law Enforcement Department
- Las Vegas Tribe of Paiute Indians of the Las Vegas Indian Colony
  - Las Vegas Paiute Police Department
- Lovelock Paiute Tribe of the Lovelock Indian Colony
  - Lovelock Colony Police Department
- Moapa Band of Paiute Indians of the Moapa River Indian Reservation
  - Moapa River Police Department
- Paiute-Shoshone Tribe of the Fallon Reservation and Colony
  - Fallon Paiute Shoshone Tribe Police Department
- Pyramid Lake Paiute Tribe of the Pyramid Lake Reservation
  - Pyramid Lake Police Department
  - Pyramid Lake Rangers
- Reno-Sparks Indian Colony
  - Reno-Sparks Indian Colony Tribal Police
- Shoshone-Paiute Tribes of the Duck Valley Reservation
  - Shoshone-Paiute Tribes Fish & Game Department
  - Shoshone-Paiute Tribes Police Department
- U.S. Department of the Interior
  - Bureau of Indian Affairs
    - Western Region
      - Eastern Nevada Agency
        - Office of Law Enforcement
      - Western Nevada Agency
        - Division of Law Enforcement Services
- Walker River Paiute Tribe of the Walker River Reservation
  - Walker River Tribal Police Department
- Washoe Tribe of Nevada and California
  - Washoe Tribe Police

== Railroad police ==
- Union Pacific Police Department

Amtrak Police Department

== Defunct agencies ==
- Clark County Sheriff's Department
- Hoover Dam Police Department
- Las Vegas Police Department
- Caliente Police Department

== Limited jurisdiction agencies ==
- Clark County School District Police
- University Medical Center Department of Public Safety
- Washoe County School District Police
