= Las Vegas City Marshals =

- Common name: Deputy city marshals, city marshals, or Las Vegas marshals
- Abbreviation: LVCM

Jurisdictional structure
- Operations jurisdiction: Las Vegas, Clark County, Nevada
- Legal jurisdiction: Las Vegas
- General nature: Local civilian police

Operational structure
- Headquarters: Las Vegas
- Deputy city marshals: 53 (as of 2017)
- Agency executive: Jason Potts, Marshal of the City of Las Vegas
- Parent agency: City of Las Vegas Department of Public Safety

Website
- Official website

The Las Vegas City Marshals (LVCM) is a security police agency of the city of Las Vegas, Nevada. The LVCM is responsible for providing law enforcement and security services to buildings, parks, trails, and other lands and properties owned, leased, or controlled by the Las Vegas municipal government. The agency is part of the city of Las Vegas Department of Public Safety (LVDPS).

The LVCM consisted of 53 deputy city marshals as of 2017.

Since 2025, the agency is subject to a lawsuit challenging the LVCM's jurisdiction. The plaintiff has argued that the LVCM may only exercise law enforcement powers on city property; the city has asserted that while the LVCM's primary responsibility is for city property, they maintain such powers off-property.

== Overview ==
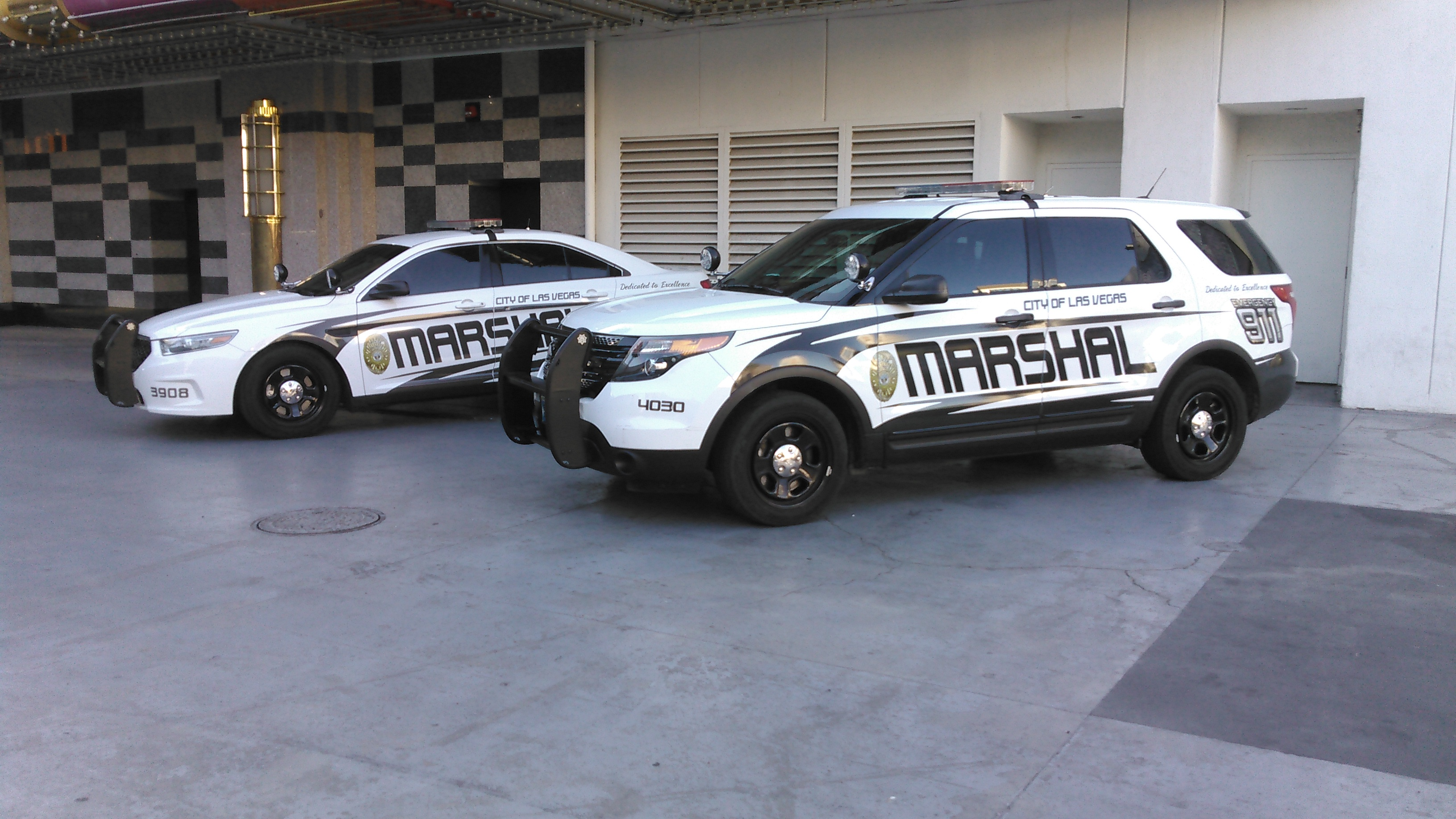
LVCM Ford Police Interceptor Sedan and Ford Police Interceptor Utility

Sworn LVCM personnel are state-certified law enforcement officers that work for the city of Las Vegas and protect city property, parks, trails, and facilities. This is done in conjunction with the other law enforcement agencies in Las Vegas and Clark County, namely the Las Vegas Metropolitan Police Department, for whom the LVCM patrols parks.

The LVDPS also manages the LVDPS Corrections Division (which operates the Las Vegas Detention Center) and the LVDPS Animal Protection Services (the city's animal control service), though these are not connected to the LVCM and its duties. The LVCM is also separate from and not affiliated with the Marshal Division of the Las Vegas Justice Court, which provides security policing services to city courthouses.

== Structure and classification ==
Sworn LVCM personnel are classified as "category I" peace officers by the state of Nevada.

Marshal of the city of Las Vegas	
Deputy city marshal lieutenant	
Deputy city marshal sergeant	
Deputy city marshal	No insignia

== Equipment ==
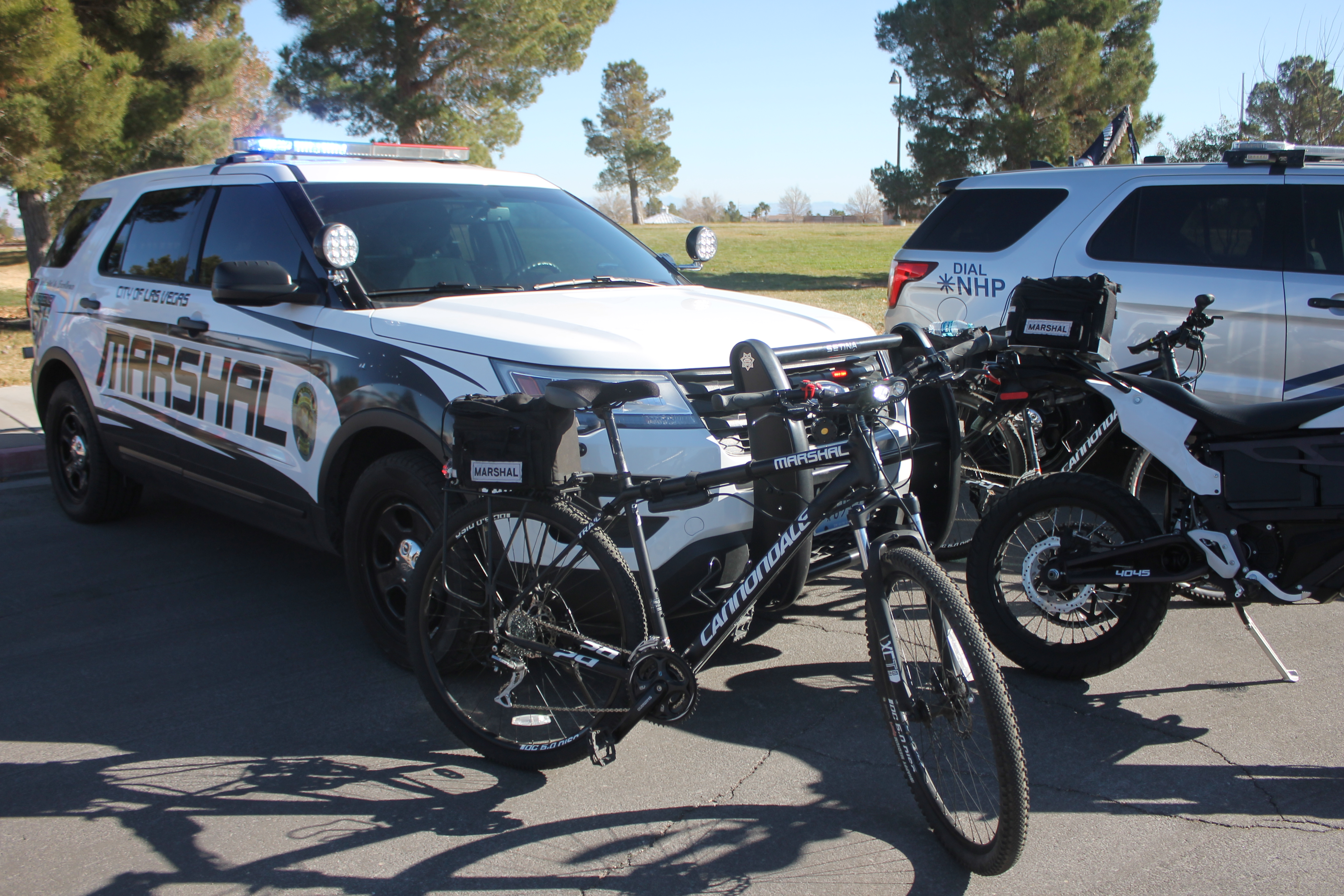
LVCM Ford Police Interceptor Utility, police bicycle, and dirtbikes in 2020

Deputy City Marshals wear dark blue uniforms, though their police motorcycle units wear bright blue uniform tops. Deputy City Marshals are armed with a pistol alongside other standard police equipment, such as a taser and a baton.

The LVCM formerly used the Ford Crown Victoria Police Interceptor, but after its discontinuation, they were retired in favor of newer Ford Police Interceptor Sedan and Ford Police Interceptor Utility cruisers. The LVCM also uses a fleet of dirtbikes.

== Legal issues and controversies ==
=== Myers lawsuit ===
On March 27, 2025, Derek Myers brought a lawsuit against the LVCM, claiming the agency engages in a "systemic pattern of unconstitutional and unlawful conduct" by conducting arrests outside their alleged legal jurisdiction. Myers alleges that the LVCM is operating as a "rogue law enforcement agency". The lawsuit stems from an incident on January 9, 2025, where Myers was pulled-over by city marshals for alleged traffic violations. The lawsuit further alleges the marshals conducted an unlawful search of Myers and his vehicle, and performed a faulty DUI test. Myers additionally claims that he was not provided with a Miranda warning. As of 2026, Myers is attempting to transition his lawsuit into a class-action case.

==== Jurisdiction dispute ====
Previous court documents from the department describe the agency as having a "limited" jurisdiction, with one document attesting to "patrolling city-owned property, including parks". In another previous court filing, the LVDPS director stated that LVCM "jurisdiction is limited geographically and in scope".

Following multiple investigatory reports by local news organizations and multiple lawsuits being filed against the agency, the LVCM website was updated to read:

While the deputy city marshals' primary role is to enforce laws on city-owned property, deputy city marshals are also authorized to enforce all municipal street and traffic laws as well as state vehicle laws applicable to city roadways. Marshals frequently travel on city streets while responding to calls or patrolling facilities and may witness crimes in progress, requiring immediate action to protect citizens, safeguard property and prevent harm. This authority includes enforcing moving traffic violations within the city.

The city website further refers to marshals as being classified as "category I peace officers" by the state of Nevada. The city asserts this provides sworn LVCM personnel with "full arrest powers and the authority to conduct traffic stops for observed violations".

The city has further contested the jurisdiction and authority arguments in court. The city has also asserted that LVCM personnel have jurisdiction outside city property and that they had the authority to conduct traffic stops and make arrests outside of their standard jurisdiction. A spokesperson for the city has further opined that Nevada "category I peace officers" — such as sworn LVCM personnel — are not limited by geographical jurisdiction.

Las Vegas city Mayor Shelley Berkley stated in 2025 that she "support[s]" the LVCM, further adding:

"I have to tell you, I am very keen on the marshals[...] I am not pleased about the lawsuits. I think they're frivolous and they're foolish. [...] As a citizen — forget the fact that I'm the mayor — as a citizen, if I see a crime in front of my eyes, I think it's my responsibility and my duty as a citizen to intervene in a way to protect the public. Now why would the marshals have less ability to do that than a private citizen in the city of Las Vegas?"

=== Resolved lawsuits ===
A 2025 lawsuit alleged that three Las Vegas residents were subject to excessive force, wrongful arrest, and racial profiling by the LVCM, stemming from an incident in November 2023. An investigation by KTNV-TV revealed that one officer involved in the incident resigned from the LVCM and was later hired by the North Las Vegas Police Department (the individual later "separated" from the NLVPD). In December 2025, the city agreed to pay a $150,000 settlement to the three plaintiffs, each receiving $50,000; the city did not admit to any liability. The city did not state whether or not they had many any policy or personnel changes (apart from the deputy marshal that resigned).

In April 2026, the city settled a lawsuit accusing the LVCM of excessive force for $20,000. As part of the settlement, the city stated that it was "pleased to reach a resolution to litigation and in this case no portion of the settlement was for lost wages, injuries, damages or an admission of liability."

=== Other controversies ===
According to an investigation by KTNV conducted in March 2025, marshals stopped and detained homeless people throughout the city, and alleges a marshal "kicked [a] man in the foot".

== See also ==
- Las Vegas Metropolitan Police
- List of law enforcement agencies in Nevada
