= Clark County Fire Department (Nevada) =

County fire department in Nevada, United States

Coordinates: 36.20°N 115.02°W

Operational area
- Country: United States
- State: Nevada
- County: Clark

Agency overview
- Established: November 23, 1953
- Annual calls: 152,894 (2024)
- Employees: 1081
- Staffing: Career & Volunteer
- Fire chief: Billy Samuels
- EMS level: ALS
- IAFF: 1908

Facilities and equipment
- Battalions: 5
- Stations: 42 (32 Career, 10 Volunteer)
- Engines: 42
- Trucks: 6
- Squads: 15
- Rescues: 1
- Ambulances: 35
- Tenders: 6
- HAZMAT: 1 (OOS)
- Airport crash: 5
- Wildland: 2
- Light and air: 2

Website
- Official website
- IAFF website

The Clark County Fire Department (CCFD) provides fire protection and emergency medical services for the unincorporated areas of Clark County, Nevada, United States. The cities of Las Vegas, Boulder City, North Las Vegas, Henderson and Mesquite each have their own fire department, but emergency management is provided by the county government.

== Fire Administration ==
The CCFD is headed by a Fire Chief, currently Billy Samuels, who replaced former Fire Chief John C. Steinbeck on Feb. 18, 2025.

The CCFD organization consists of six bureaus. Each bureau is commanded by a Deputy Fire Chief. These bureaus include:

- Operations Bureau
- Office of Emergency Management
- Emergency Medical Services/Finance/Administration Bureau
- Fire Training/Recruitment Bureau
- Fire Prevention Bureau
- Law Enforcement/Special Events Bureau

=== Command Staff ===
Command Staff	Title & Department
Thomas Touchstone	Senior Deputy Fire Chief, Operations
Jennifer Wyatt	Senior Deputy Fire Chief, Operational Support
Wayne Dailey	Deputy Fire Chief, Fire Prevention
Steven De Pue	Deputy Fire Chief, Special Events
Sean Collins	Deputy Fire Chief, Training
Brian O'Neal	Deputy Fire Chief, Office of Emergency Management
Carlito Rayos	Deputy Fire Chief, Special Operations
Kenny Holding	Deputy Fire Chief, Fire Suppression
Danny Horvat	Assistant Fire Chief, Fire Prevention
Scott Carnahan	Assistant Fire Chief, Airport Operations
Mack Travis	Assistant Fire Chief, Recruitment
John M. Baynes	Assistant Fire Chief, Fire Prevention
Kevin Lunkwitz	Assistant Fire Chief, Rural Services
Dan Bushkin	Assistant Fire Chief, Special Events

== USAR Task Force ==
Urban Search and Rescue Nevada Task Force 1 or NV-TF1 is a FEMA Urban Search and Rescue Task Force based in Clark County. The task force is sponsored by the Clark County Fire Department but also has members from the Las Vegas Fire & Rescue, Henderson Fire Department, North Las Vegas Fire Department and the Las Vegas Metropolitan Police Department.

== Notable fires ==
=== MGM Grand fire ===
On November 21, 1980, the MGM Grand Hotel and Casino (now Horseshoe Las Vegas) in Paradise, Nevada suffered a major fire. The fire killed 85 people, most through smoke inhalation. The CCFD was the first agency to respond, and thus was in command at the scene of the fire, which remains the worst disaster in Nevada history, and the third-worst hotel fire in modern United States history.

=== PEPCON disaster ===
The PEPCON disaster was an industrial disaster that occurred in Henderson on May 4, 1988, at the Pacific Engineering and Production Company of Nevada (PEPCON) plant. The fire and subsequent explosions killed 2 and injured 372 people and caused an estimated US$100 million of damage. A large portion of the Las Vegas Valley within a 10 miles (16 km) radius of the plant was affected, and several agencies activated disaster plans. The Clark County Fire Department Chief alerted all units to the facility. The Henderson Fire Department has units already staged closer to the explosion and many were injured. The Clark County Fire Department units were the second department in and took over medical/fire operations as many Henderson firefighters were down and injured; including the Henderson Fire Chief and the passenger in his car. Clark County Firefighters donned specialized personal protective equipment and moved into the scene. Leaking tanks of anhydrous ammonia and residue from acid and other caustic chemicals took days to repair and clean. Two were confirmed dead on scene; Bruce Halker the plant manager’s remains were discovered in his wheelchair and controller Roy Westerfield’s body was obliterated in the final blast. Both deceased had physical disabilities that disabled them from clearing the blast radius of the PEPCON plant in time. Some reports detailed that Roy Westerfield recognized the inevitable explosion and stayed behind to inform both Henderson and Clark County Fire Departments of the impending disaster. The Clark County Fire Department and other responding EMS agencies transported over 100 patients to five surrounding hospitals along with their heroic fire suppression and chemical overhaul.

== Stations & Apparatus ==
Clark County FD Engine 23, serving Sunrise Manor

Fire Station 12

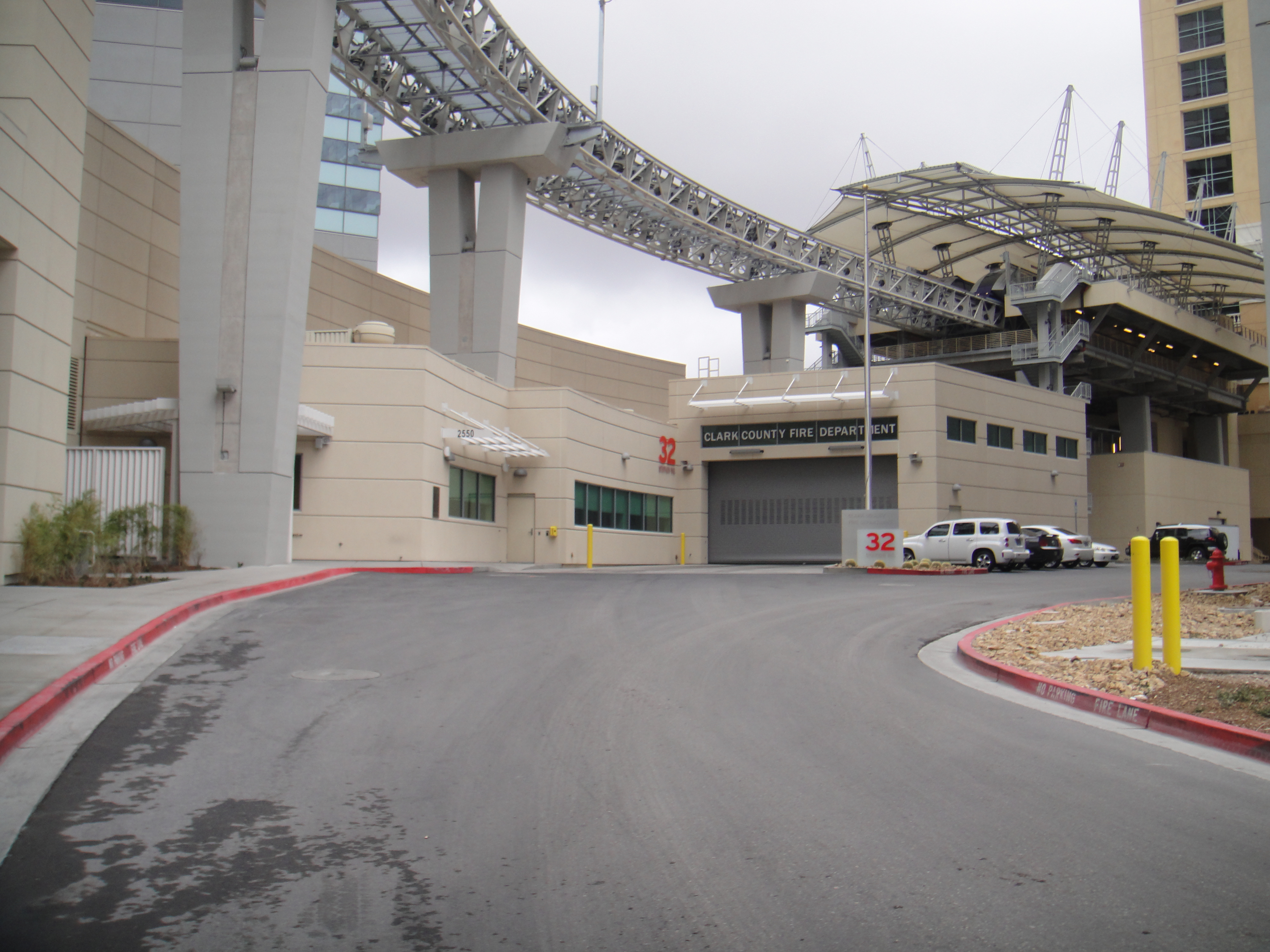
Photo of the Clark County Fire Station #32 at CityCenter

The CCFD is spread out throughout the unincorporated areas of the county in 42 separate fire stations, including one located at Harry Reid International Airport.

Fire Station Number	Address	Engine Company	Truck Company	Emergency Medical Services Rescue Unit	Other (Specialty, Cross Staffed)
11	5150 S Las Vegas Blvd	Engine 11		Rescue 11	Rescue 211
12	3050 S Sammy Davis Jr Dr	Engine 12		Rescue 12, Rescue 212	
13	Harry Reid International Airport	Engine 13			Red Dog 40, 41, 42, 43, 44. Squad 13
14	3260 Topaz St	Engine 14		Rescue 14	Air Resource 14
15	3480 S Valley View Blvd	Engine 15 Engine 215		Rescue 15 Rescue 215	
16	6131 E. Washington Ave.	Engine 16			
17	5110 Andover Dr	Engine 17	Truck 17	Rescue 17	Squad 17
18	575 E Flamingo Rd	Engine 18	Truck 18	Rescue 18	Battalion 2, Squad 18
19	5575 Spencer St	Engine 19		Rescue 19	
20	5865 Judson Ave	Engine 20		Rescue 20	
21	5015 W Oquendo Rd	Engine 21		Rescue 21	Heavy Rescue 21 Battalion 7
22	6745 W Flamingo Rd	Engine 22	Truck 22	Rescue 22	
23	4250 E Alexander Rd	Engine 23		Rescue 23 Rescue 223	
24 (Special Events)	7525 Dean Martin Dr	Engine 24	Truck 24	Rescue 24	Hazmat 24 (OOS)
25	5210 S Pecos Rd	Engine 25		Rescue 25	Battalion 13
26	4030 S El Capitan Way	Engine 26		Rescue 26	Air Resource 26
27	4695 Vegas Valley Dr	Engine 27		Rescue 27, Rescue 227	Battalion 3 & Squad 27
28	10820 W Sahara Ave	Engine 28		Rescue 28	
29	7530 Paradise Rd	Engine 29			Battalion 6
30	7980 W Robindale Rd	Engine 30	Truck 30		
31	2190 S Hollywood Blvd	Engine 31			
32	2550 W Harmon Ave	Engine 32		Rescue 32	Squad 32
33	865 E Desert Inn Rd	Engine 33		Rescue 33, Rescue 233	MCI 33, EMS 33
34	8675 W Oquendo Rd	Engine 34		Rescue 34	
35	10350 W. Flamingo Road	Engine 35			
38	1755 Silver Hawk Ave	Engine 38		Rescue 38	
61	150 N. Nellis Street	Engine 61	Truck 61	Rescue 61	
65	3825 W Starr Ave	Engine 65		Rescue 65	Water Tender 65
66	7929 Mountains Edge Pky	Engine 66		Rescue 66	Squad 66
71	200 W Virgin St	Engine 71		Rescue 71	Squad 71 & Water Tender 71
72	22 E State Route 168	Engine 72		Rescue 72	Squad 72 & Water Tender 72
73	3570 Lyman St	Engine 73		Rescue 73	Squad 73, Brush 73 & Water Tender 73
75	255 S Nevada St	Engine 75		Rescue 75	Squad 75 & Water Tender 75
74	310 N Moapa Valley Blvd	Engine 74		Rescue 74	Squad 74, Brush 74 & Water Tender 74
76	50 Laughlin Civic Dr	Engine 76	Truck 76	Rescue 76	Technical Rescue 76
77	650 W Quartz Ave	Engine 77		Rescue 77	Squad 77 & Water Tender 77
78	375 N Beacon St	Engine 78			Squad 78 & Water Tender 78
79	0 State Route 160	Engine 79			Squad 79
80	28 Cottonwood Dr	Engine 80			Squad 80 & Water Tender 80
81	25 Ski Chalet Pl	Engine 81		Rescue 81	Squad 81
82	0 Camp Bonanza Rd	Engine 82		Rescue 82	Squad 82
83	715 W Gretta Ln	Engine 83		Rescue 83	Squad 83
84	Apache Rd	Engine 84		Rescue 84	Squad 84 & Water Tender 84
85	3770 S James Bilbray Pky	Engine 85			
87	20400 S Las Vegas Blvd			Rescue 87	
