= North Las Vegas Fire Department =

Fire department in Nevada, United States

Operational area
- Country: United States
- State: Nevada
- City: North Las Vegas

Agency overview
- Annual calls: 24,545 (2012)
- Employees: 162
- Staffing: Career
- Fire chief: Joseph Calhoun
- EMS level: ALS
- IAFF: 1607

Facilities and equipment
- Battalions: 2
- Stations: 8
- Engines: 6
- Trucks: 2
- Platforms: 1
- Squads: 1
- Wildland: 1 - Type 6
- Light and air: 1

Website
- Official website
- IAFF website

The North Las Vegas Fire Department is the agency that provides fire protection and emergency medical services for the city of North Las Vegas, Nevada. As part of an agreement with the Clark County Fire Department and the Las Vegas Fire & Rescue Department, all three fire departments respond to calls sent through the Fire Alarm Office (FAO) located at the Las Vegas Fire & Rescue Department Headquarters (Station 1).

In 2012, the NLVFD responded to 24,545 emergencies which resulted in a total of 31,947 unit responses with an average response time of 5 minutes and 17 seconds.

== MGM Grand Fire ==
On November 21, 1980 the MGM Grand Hotel and Casino (now Bally's Las Vegas) in Paradise, Nevada suffered a major fire. The fire killed 85 people, most through smoke inhalation. The NLVFD was one of the main agencies to respond to the fire which remains the worst disaster in Nevada history, and the third-worst hotel fire in modern U.S. history.

== Stations & Apparatus ==
The NLVFD is an all-hazards department that provides emergency response from nine fire stations using six engines, three trucks, four ALS rescues, two ILS rescues, an air/light resource unit, an ALS Squad, a brush engine and two Battalion Chiefs along with a variety of support units.

Fire Station Number	Address	Engine Company	Rescue Units	Support units
50	105 East Cheyenne Ave	ALS Engine 50	ALS Rescue 50	Brush Engine 50
51	2626 East Carey Ave	ALS Engine 51	ALS Rescue 51 Rescue 251	Battalion 5
52	4110 Losee Rd	ALS Truck 52	Rescue 52	Tech Rescue 52 Air Resource 52
53	2804 West Gowan Rd	ALS Engine 53	ALS Rescue 53	
54	5438 Camino Al Norte	ALS Truck 54	Rescue 54	
55	5725 Allen Ln	ALS Engine 55	ALS Rescue 55	EMS15
56	3475 West Elkhorn Dr	ALS Engine 56	ALS Rescue 56	
57	3120 East Azure Ave	ALS Engine 57		
58	960 E Deer Springs Way	Truck 58	Rescue 58	Battalion 15
