= Nevada Department of Agriculture =

Nevada state government department

The Nevada State Department of Agriculture is the department of the Nevada State government responsible for managing the welfare of Nevada citizens and regulating Nevada's agriculture and related industries.

== History ==
The department was originally called the State Board of Stock Commissioners, which started operating following its approval on March 26, 1915, as part of the 1915 Nevada legislature. The commission focused on regulating the cattle, horse, and hog industries, including the inspection and management of animal diseases affecting these animals, in collaboration with the State Veterinary Control Service department of the University of Nevada.

It was only in 1961 that the board of commissioners was expanded into a state department. The structure of the organization underwent some changes following a change in legislation in 2013, where the Dairy Commission, the Commodity Food Program, and the Nutrition Programs were moved from other state departments and became part of the Department of Agriculture.

== Divisions ==
The department is divided into four divisions:

1. Animal industry, which also operates two laboratories for animal disease and food safety as well as microbiology. The division also manages and regulates livestock identification and wildlife services.
2. Consumer equitability, a division that manages and regulates weight and measurements in Nevada, alongside petroleum technology.
3. Food and nutrition, which includes the management and regulation of the following: child nutrition, commodity foods, and dairy commission.
4. Plant industry, which manages and regulates the following fields: chemistry, entomology, environmental services, export certification, noxious weeds, nursery programs, organic programs, pest control, plant pathology, producer certification, rangeland health program, seed programs, specialty crop block grant program, and good agricultural practices.

== See also ==
- United States Department of Agriculture
