= Las Vegas Metropolitan Police Department =

Law enforcement agency in Nevada, United States

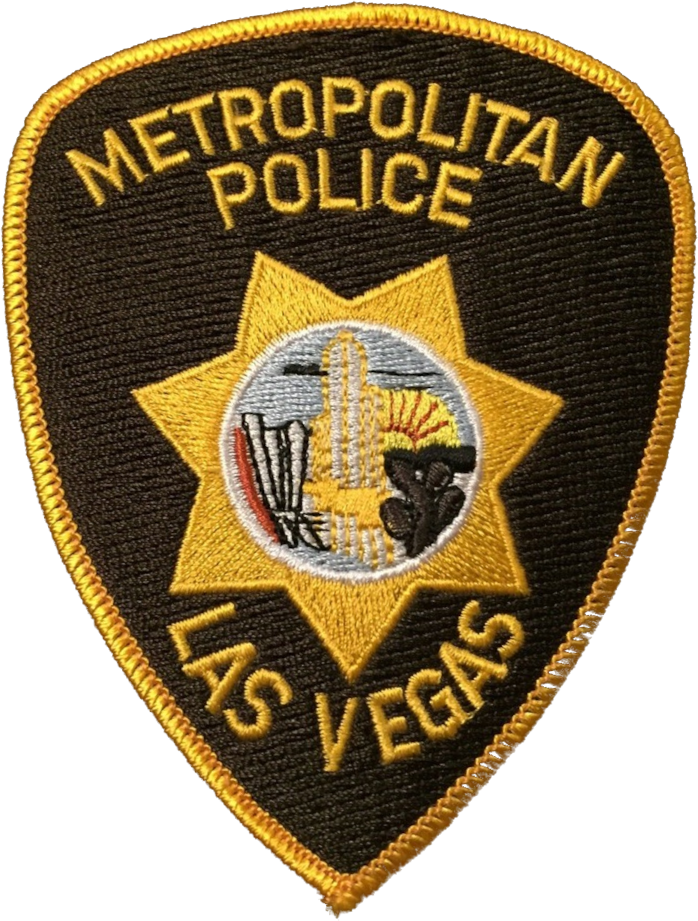
- Las Vegas Metropolitan Police Department patch

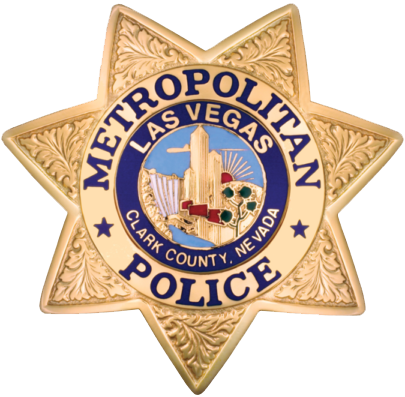
- Las Vegas Metropolitan Police Department badge
- Common name: Metro · Metro PD
- Abbreviation: LVMPD
- Motto: "Partners with the community"

Agency overview
- Formed: July 1, 1973; 53 years ago
- Preceding agencies: Las Vegas Police Department; Clark County Sheriff's Department
- Employees: 5,819 (2018)
- Annual budget: US$856,312,417 (2018)

Jurisdictional structure
- Operations jurisdiction: Clark County, Nevada, US
- Area: 8,061 sq mi (20,878 km²)
- Population: 2,676,087(2024)
- Legal jurisdiction: Clark County, Nevada, US (excluding the cities of Henderson, North Las Vegas, Boulder City and Mesquite)

Operational structure
- Headquarters: 400 South Martin Luther King Jr. Boulevard; Las Vegas, Nevada
- Sworn members: 4,109 (2022)
- LVMPD Executive Staffs responsible: Kevin McMahill, Sheriff of Clark County; Andrew Walsh, Undersheriff; Dori Koren, Assistant Sheriff; Jamie Prosser, Assistant Sheriff; Fred Haas, Assistant Sheriff; James Kilber, Chief Administrative Officer
- Area Commands: 10

Facilities
- Airbases: 1
- Detention Centers: 3
- Marked and Unmarked Cars: c. 2,000
- Motorcycles: c. 160
- Boats: 3
- Helicopters: 5
- Dogs: 42

Website
- lvmpd.com

The Las Vegas Metropolitan Police Department (LVMPD, nicknamed Metro) is a combined city and county law enforcement agency for the City of Las Vegas and Clark County, Nevada, United States. It is headed by the Sheriff of Clark County, who is publicly elected every four years. The sheriff is the only elected head law enforcement officer within the county.

Metro is the largest law enforcement agency in Nevada, and in 2009, was one of the largest police agencies in the United States according to Uniform Crime Reporting by the Federal Bureau of Investigation. The Clark County Detention Center is one of the largest jail systems in the United States, as well.

== History ==
The Las Vegas Metropolitan Police Department (LVMPD) was formed on July 1, 1973, by merging the Las Vegas Police Department with the Clark County Sheriff's Department. Metro serves the city limits of Las Vegas and the unincorporated areas and towns of Clark County.

In the early 1970s, both the Las Vegas Police Department and the Clark County Sheriff's Department struggled with jurisdictional and budgetary problems. Oftentimes, people living in the metropolitan area would call the wrong agency to report crimes in progress, which would delay police response. Both agencies were also strapped for manpower, yet used a lot of it duplicating record-keeping and administrative functions in both of the agencies. The idea of consolidating the two law enforcement agencies into one metropolitan department began to circulate among the top officials in both agencies, likely due to the close working relationship between the Clark County Sheriff and the Las Vegas Police Chief at that time. It was said that even police officers on the Las Vegas Police Department could see that it would be better if the agency were run by the Sheriff, due to the fact that he was an elected official. Legislation to merge the Las Vegas Police Department with the Clark County Sheriff's Department was passed by the Nevada State Legislature, and the merger became effective in 1973.

In 1999, an outside audit conducted by DMG-Maximus, commended the department for having fewer managers and supervisors than are typically found in large police agencies. The audit also said that the managers, both sworn and civilian, were of "excellent quality".

On January 5, 2015, the Las Vegas Metropolitan Police Department officially assumed responsibility for the Las Vegas Township Constable's Office. Las Vegas Township Constable's Office continues to be a separate entity but under Metro's Detention Services Division.

The Las Vegas Metro Police Department has more than 5,800 members. Of these, over 2,900 are police officers of various ranks and over 750 are corrections officers of various ranks.

In November 2024, venture capitalist Ben Horowitz was reported to have funded at least $7.6 million in LVMPD purchases during the previous few years, and to have acted as facilitator between the department and at least six of his a16z portfolio companies. Purchases from Horowitz's donations include Skydio drones, in which he was an early investor.

=== Misconduct ===
Since the late 1970s, more than 100 LVMPD officers and civilian employees have been implicated in documented instances of police misconduct and/or actual criminal activity, with numerous incidents resulting in lawsuit settlements in excess of a million dollars apiece. A later excessive force case was tried in Davis v. City of Las Vegas. According to the New Yorker, the LVMPD had "a long-standing reputation as one of the most violent in the country" before it implemented reforms, in conjunction with the U.S. Department of Justice, in the 2010s.

== Radio system ==
LVMPD operated on a digital radio system (DesertSky), which was turned on in 2011. As of February 2018, the Las Vegas Metropolitan Police Department encrypted their radio frequencies; blocking the public from using police scanners, with no delayed web feed provided. The Las Vegas Metropolitan Police Department stated that the decision to encrypt their radio channels was made back in 2015 due to officer safety concerns.

In 2014 LVMPD entered into an agreement with Motorola, to use the Motorola Solutions APX series radios.

== Vehicle fleet ==
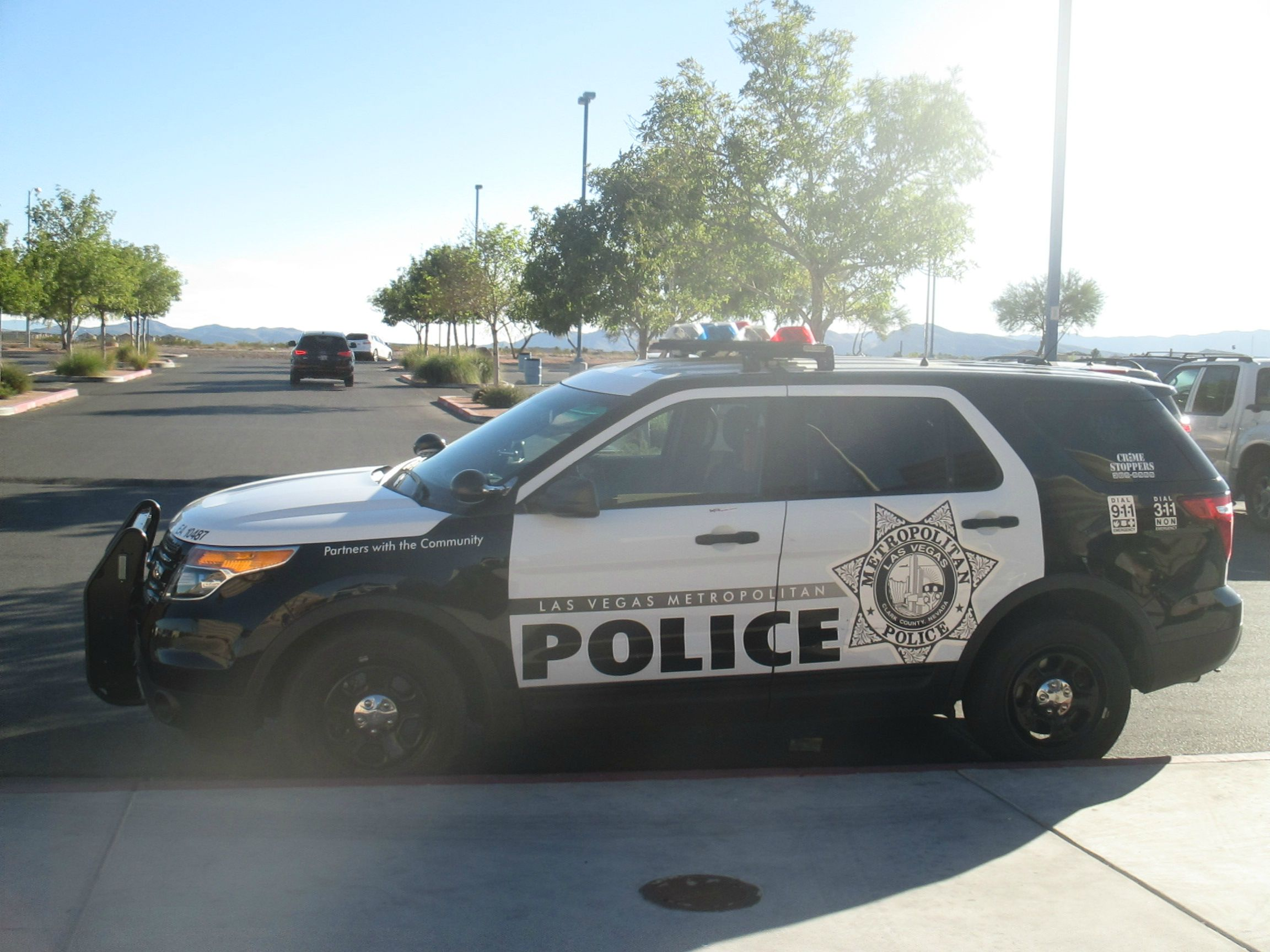
Las Vegas Metro Ford Explorer Police Interceptor in Spring Valley

Las Vegas Metro uses many vehicles from brands including Ford, Hyundai, Nissan, Jeep, Buick, Tesla, and Chevrolet as marked or unmarked vehicles. However, after the retirement of the Ford Crown Victoria in 2011, the Las Vegas Metropolitan Police went through a short session of testing vehicles. As a result, the Ford Explorer took the place of the Crown Victoria, the main patrol vehicle.

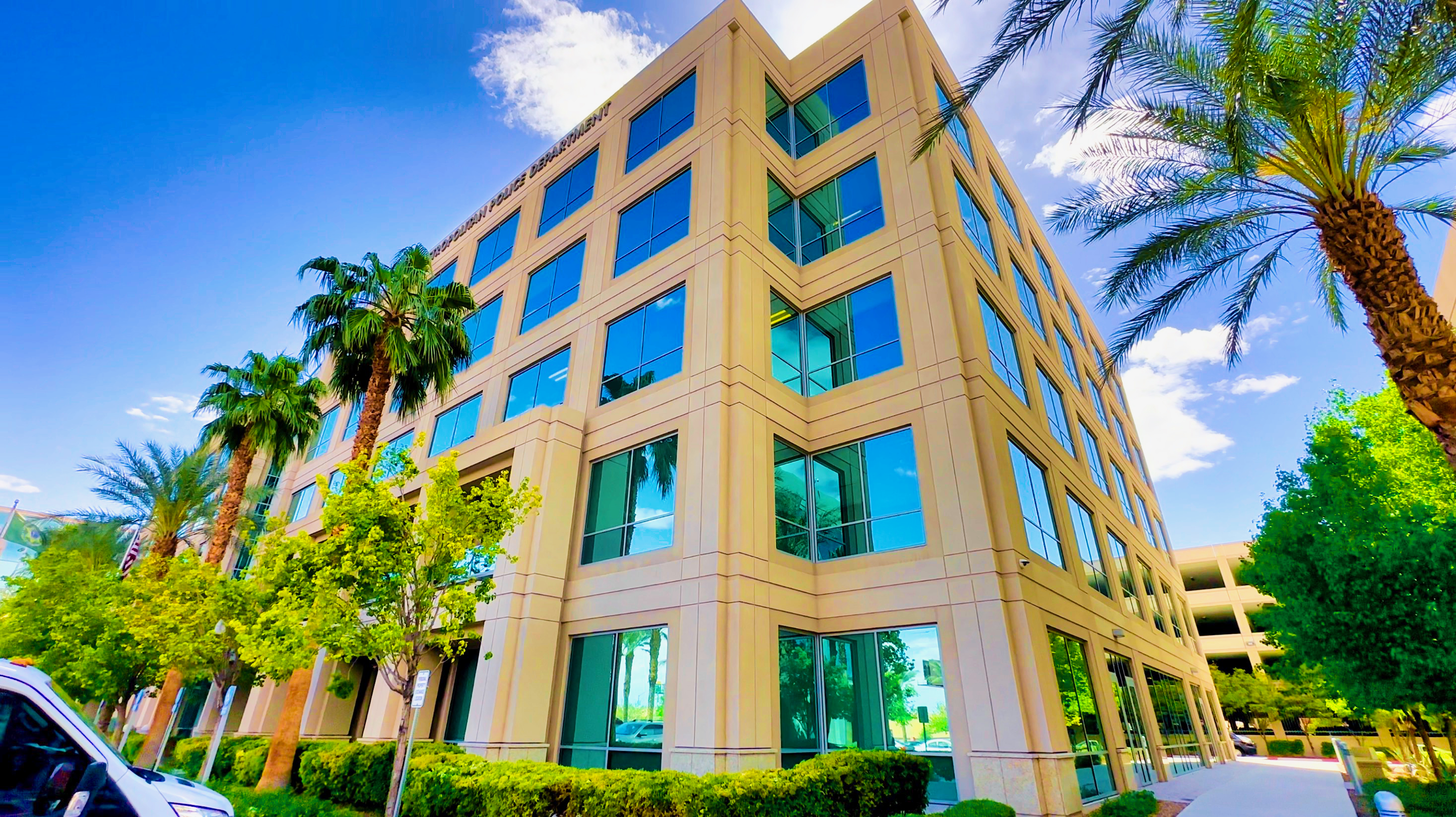
The Las Vegas Metropolitan Police headquarters

== Headquarters ==
Construction was completed on LVMPD's 370,500-square-foot headquarters, located at 400 S. Martin L. King Boulevard, in mid 2011. The building consolidated 27 bureaus, which were previously located in leased buildings around Las Vegas. It also houses the Southern Nevada Counter Terrorism Center, Police Records, and a Fingerprint Bureau annex.

== Funding ==
The police services of the department are funded by both the City of Las Vegas and Clark County. Police services funding is based on a complex formula that includes population, calls for service, and felony crimes in the prior year. Both entities must approve the annual budget, including the percentage of budget they are responsible for. The department itself generates approximately 33% of its funds through property tax, and the charging for certain services, such as special events, work cards, and privileged license investigations. Additional funding is generated from a special sales tax to fund commissioned positions.

By state law, the sheriff is charged with running the county jail, known as the Clark County Detention Center or CCDC, which is funded solely by the government and tax base of Clark County. Additionally, the police functions at Harry Reid International Airport are also solely funded by Clark County.

== Organization ==
There are two commissioned career tracks in the LVMPD. They have identical civil service rank structures and pay, but different day-to-day tasks and responsibilities.

- Corrections: These officers are tasked with operating, managing and supervising the Clark County Detention Center; there are over 750.
- Police: These officers are assigned all over the department; there are over 2,900.

The LVMPD is divided into ten urban area commands:

- Bolden (Sectors U and W)—serves the west central portion of the city, including the old westside, an area bordered by I-15, US 95, Jones and Lake Mead Boulevards.
- Convention Center (Sector M)—serves the Las Vegas Strip and Las Vegas Convention Center areas.
- Downtown (Sectors A, B and C)—this division serves Downtown Las Vegas and areas roughly east of Eastern Avenue, south of Owens Avenue and north of Sahara Avenue to include the Naked City and Fremont Street areas.
- Northeast (Sectors F and G)—Sector F includes unincorporated areas of North Las Vegas and the Las Vegas Speedway/Nellis Air Force Base area.
- Northwest (Sector X)—serves areas generally west of US 95 and north of Cheyenne Avenue.
- Southeast (Sectors H, J and K)—serves areas east of Maryland Parkway and south of Sahara Avenue. Sector J includes unincorporated areas of Henderson.
- Spring Valley (Sectors P)—serves areas west of Interstate 15, south of Charleston Boulevard and north of Flamingo Road. Also includes Chinatown.
- Enterprise (Sectors O and S)—this area serves mostly the southwest valley west of I-15 and south of Flamingo Road.
- South Central (Sectors L, N)—this area command serves the areas south of Harry Reid Airport between Interstate 15 and roughly Eastern Avenue.
- Summerlin (Sector R and V)—this area command serves the master-planned community area of the western Las Vegas Valley.

When Metro was formed in 1973, the Las Vegas Valley was served by only three area commands: North, South and West.

Other major coverage details: Traffic Bureau (all sectors), Airport Bureau (Sector Q), and nine different rural areas outside the Las Vegas Valley.

The LVMPD organization is made up of 45 bureaus and Area Commands led by Commissioned Captains/Lieutenants and Civilian Directors

== Rank structure ==
The LVMPD rank structure is as follows:

| Title | Insignia |
|---|---|
| Sheriff | |
| Undersheriff | |
| Assistant Sheriff | |
| Deputy Chief | |
| Captain/Corrections Captain | |
| Lieutenant/Corrections Lieutenant | |
| Sergeant/Corrections Sergeant | |
| Police/Corrections Officer | No insignia |

Pay for Police officers relies on separate pay grade system.

== Enforcement areas ==
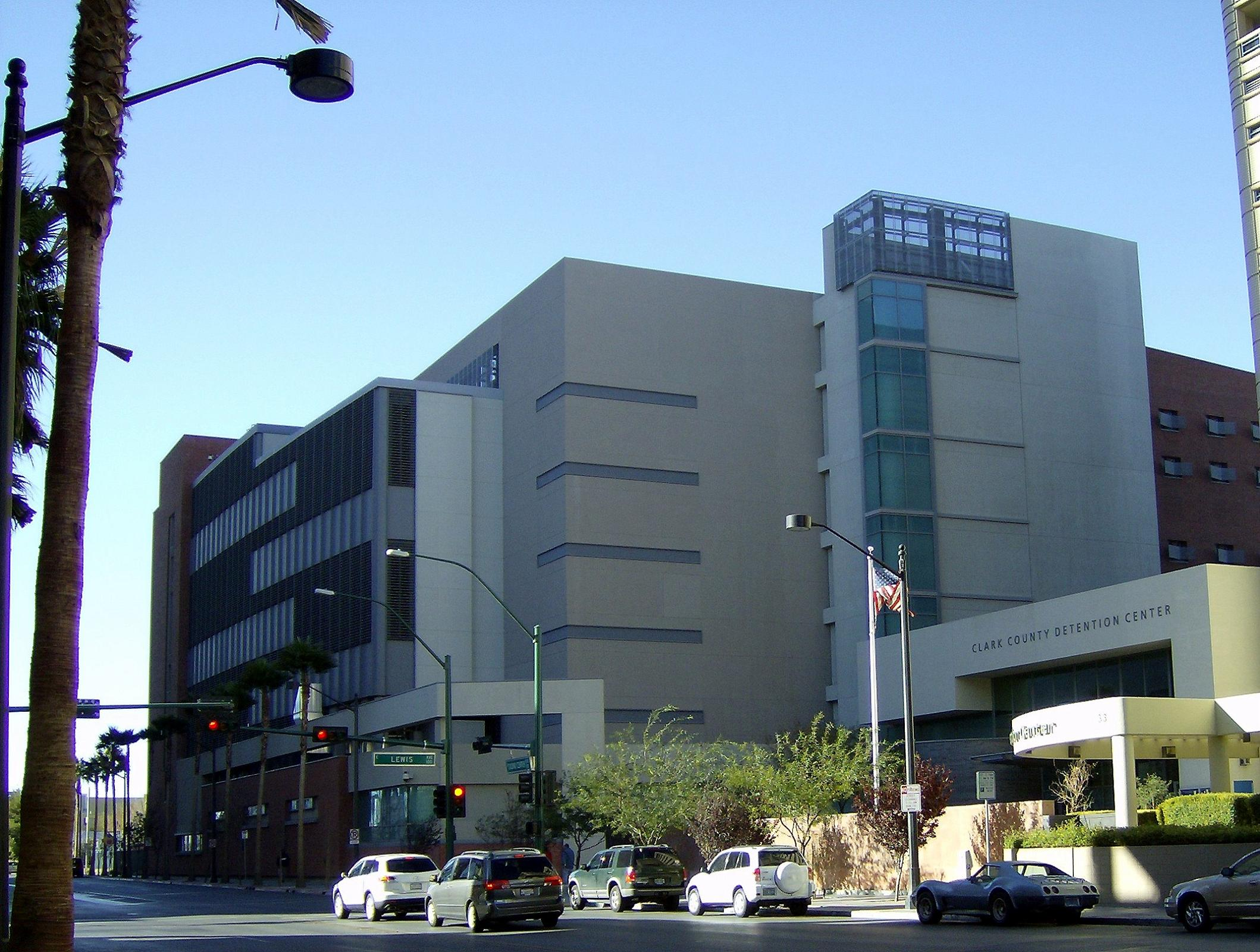
Persons arrested by the Las Vegas Metropolitan Police Department enter the criminal justice system at the Clark County Detention Center in Las Vegas.

This department provides law enforcement services for all of Clark County, including the City of Las Vegas, yielding primary jurisdiction to the following agencies:

- Boulder City Police Department in Boulder City
- Clark County Office of Public Safety in all Clark County parks and facilities
- Clark County Marshal's Office which provide law enforcement services for The Eighth Judicial District Courts
- Clark County School District Police Department on Clark County School District property
- Hoover Dam Police (formerly)
- Henderson Police Department in Henderson
- City of Las Vegas Court Marshals which deliver warrants in the City of Las Vegas
- Las Vegas City Marshals (Las Vegas Department of Public Safety) which provide law enforcement services to city parks, buildings and real property owned/leased by the city
- Mesquite Police Department in Mesquite
- National Park Service Law Enforcement Rangers
- Nevada Highway Patrol is responsible for the Interstate highways, State highways and U.S. highways in Clark County
- Nevada Capitol Police: responsible for protection of the Grant Sawyer State Office Building in Downtown Las Vegas, Nevada DMV offices, and other state-owned facilities
- North Las Vegas Police Department in North Las Vegas
- Nevada Taxicab Authority enforces laws and regulations dealing with taxicabs
- University Police Department- Southern Command on University of Nevada, Las Vegas, Nevada State University, and College of Southern Nevada campuses and sports facilities.
- Union Pacific Police Department on Union Pacific Railroad properties in southern Nevada
- United States Air Force Security Forces at Nellis Air Force Base and Creech Air Force Base
- Veterans Affairs Police at the Las Vegas VA Medical Center and other facilities

== Structure ==
The LVMPD is led by the sheriff; second in command is the undersheriff, who is assisted by three assistant sheriffs. The Office of Intergovernmental Services, the Office of General Counsel, the Office of Public Information, the Office of Finance, The Police Employee Assistance Program (PEAP), and the Office of the Sheriff Executive Staff report to the undersheriff.

Four of the six elected Clark County sheriffs since the LVMPD was consolidated in 1973 are former members of either the Clark County Sheriff's Office (CCSO) or Las Vegas Police Department (LVPD). Former Sheriffs Young and Gillespie are retired members of the LVMPD (that is they were commissioned solely as members of the LVMPD). Sheriff Gillespie rose to, and retired at, the appointed rank of undersheriff prior to assuming public office as the duly elected Sheriff of Clark County.

The department operates the Clark County Detention Center. It is used to house inmates arrested in their patrol area, with the exception of misdemeanors committed in the City of Las Vegas, which maintains its own jail. It also holds persons who are wanted for extradition to another jurisdiction, persons who are awaiting a bail hearing or trial, or those persons serving a sentence of 364 days or fewer. The CCDC has been the subject of controversy surrounding the treatment of inmates by officers. The facility has been criticized for its violations of human rights, with a major focus on verbal and sexual abuse to inmates as well as the use of controversial spit mask restraint for resistive detainees during the booking process. There have been several instances of pre-trial detention lasting for years at a time.

== Equipment ==
=== Firearms policy ===
Firearms training takes place at the LVMPD's John T. Moran Firearms Training Facility, located near Nellis Air Force Base, and named for the department's second sheriff. The facility is used by numerous local, state, and federal law enforcement agencies. At the facility, recruits receive several weeks of firearms training during their time at the police academy. Commissioned police and corrections officers must attend firearms requalification four times a year. This re-qualification is for all firearms. The qualifications include known-distance targets and tactical courses of fire in both regular and low-light.

Officers can choose their sidearm from a list of semi-automatic pistols manufactured by Beretta, Colt, Glock, Heckler & Koch, Kimber, Para-Ordnance/Para USA, Ruger, SIG Sauer, Smith & Wesson, CZ P Series, Springfield Armory, Steyr Mannlicher, Unertl, Walther, Wilson Combat, STI Staccato P. The preferred calibers are 9×19mm Parabellum, .40 S&W, and .45 ACP. As of 2016, new academy recruits must qualify with an approved 9mm pistol.

Officers are also allowed to customize their sidearms with such as slide serrations, compensators, flared mag wells, etc. Officers can also install Red Dot Sights/Optics on their service pistols but only after they completed their FTEP Phase and attend the specified training course.

=== Pistols ===
- Glock 17
- Glock 19
- Glock 22
- Glock 45
- SIG Sauer P320
- Smith & Wesson M&P
- Springfield Armory 1911A1
- Beretta APX

=== Rifles ===
- MC6 AR-15
- MC6 AR-10
- Smith & Wesson M&P15

=== Non-lethal ===
- Axon X26P Taser

=== Crowd control ===
- Genasys Long Range Acoustic Device

=== Vehicles ===
- Ford Crown Victoria
- Ford Expedition
- Ford F-150
- Ford F-250
- Ford Explorer
- Ford Police Interceptor Sedan
- Ford Police Interceptor Utility
- Ford Transit
- Ring Power Corporation The Rook
- Chevrolet Express
- Chevy Tahoe
- Tesla Cybertruck

=== UAVs ===
- Brinc Lemur S
- Skydio X2
- Skydio X10
- Skyfront Perimiter 8
- Teledyne Flir Skyranger R70

== In popular culture ==
- Rush Hour 2, Las Vegas police can be seen in the later half of the movie
- Ocean's Eleven (1960 film) (as Clark County Sheriff's Office)
- Ocean's Eleven (2001 film)
- Kolchak: The Night Stalker (1974)
- The Gauntlet (1977)
- Vega$ (1978-1981)
- Diamonds Are Forever (1971) (as Las Vegas Police Department (LVPD)
- Rocky IV (1985)
- COPS (featured regularly since 1990)
- Honey, I Blew Up the Kid (1992) on the Vegas Strip where Adam Szalinski walked.
- Best of the Best II (1993)
- Another Stakeout (1993)
- Casino (1995)
- Con Air (1997), the ending scenes
- CSI: Crime Scene Investigation (2000-2015) (fictitiously depicted as the "Las Vegas Police Department" in the show)
- George of the Jungle 2 (2003) (fictitiously depicted as the "Las Vegas Police" helicopter)
- Las Vegas (2003-2008)
- Dodgeball: A True Underdog Story (2004)
- Rocky Balboa
- Next (2007)
- The Hangover (2009)
- The First 48
- The video game Grand Theft Auto San Andreas (2004; fictitiously depicted as the Las Venturas Police Department)
- Las Vegas Jailhouse (crime documentary featured since 2010)
- Drugs, Inc. (2010–present)
- Vegas Strip (crime documentary featured since 2011)
- Vegas (2012) on CBS (as Clark County Sheriff's Office)
- The Last Stand (2013)
- The Player (2015)
- Jason Bourne (2016)
- Sleepless (2017)
- Driver 2
- The Crew
- Knight Rider (1982; Michael Knight AKA Formerly Michael Long had his last undercover assignment in Las Vegas, but was an LAPD officer undercover)
- Knight Rider (2008; where Michael Knight's son, Michael "Mike" Traceur lived before he became the driver of the new K.I.T.T.)
- Call of Duty Ghosts
- Tom Clancy's Rainbow Six: Vegas
- Gangstar Vegas

== See also ==
- List of law enforcement agencies in Nevada
- West Las Vegas riots
- O. J. Simpson and O. J. Simpson robbery case
- River Run Riot
- Bundy standoff
- Tupac Shakur and The Killing of Tupac Shakur, book by crime author Cathy Scott
- Bright Lights, Dark Places, memoir by former Metro Police Lt. Debra Gauthier
