= Nevada State Police =

U.S. state law enforcement agency

- Patch

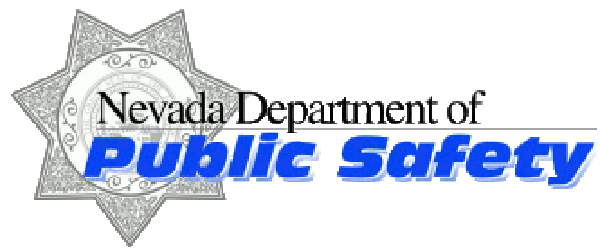
- Logo Banner

- Badge and Logo
- Common name: Nevada State Police
- Abbreviation: NSP

Agency overview
- Formed: 1908; 118 years ago
- Preceding agencies: Nevada Department of Public Safety
- Employees

Jurisdictional structure
- Operations jurisdiction: Nevada, U.S.
- Map of the NSP's Jurisdiction
- Area: 110,567 square miles (286,370 km^{2})
- Population: 3,115,609 (2019 est.)
- Legal jurisdiction: (Nevada) Statewide
- General nature: Civilian police

Operational structure
- Headquarters: 555 Wright Way Carson City, Nevada
- DPS Officers: ▼218 of 392 (2024)
- Civilian members
- Director of NV DPS responsible: George Togliatti
- Agency executive: Michael Edgell, Superintendent
- Parent agency: Nevada Department of Public Safety

Facilities
- Commands: 4
- Airplanes: 0
- Dogs: 10 German Shepherds

Website
- DPS Website

The Nevada State Police (NSP), also known as the Nevada Department of Public Safety (DPS) from roughly 1949 to 2021, is the state police and highway patrol agency of Nevada, with state-wide jurisdiction. The Nevada State Police encompass the Division of Parole and Probation, the Nevada Highway Patrol, the Capitol Police Division, the Division of Investigations, the Office of Professional Responsibility, the Fire Marshall Division and the Records, Compliance and Communications Division as well as various other smaller entities.

The Nevada State Police is a rebranding of the Nevada Department of Public Safety. The NSP's headquarters are located in Carson City, with regional commands in Reno, Elko, and Las Vegas.

== History ==
In 1908, the Nevada State Police was created to provide a state level law enforcement presence as a result of labor strikes in Nevada's mining communities. When automobiles became available in the early 20th century, the problem of enforcing the laws of the road soon followed. On June 23, 1923, the first Nevada State Highway Patrolman was hired by the Nevada Highway Department under the supervision of the Inspector of the Nevada State Police. This officer and the Inspector of the State Police would travel throughout the State collecting automobile registration fees and enforcing the laws of the highway. Nevada was one of the first western states to have an organized highway patrol function.

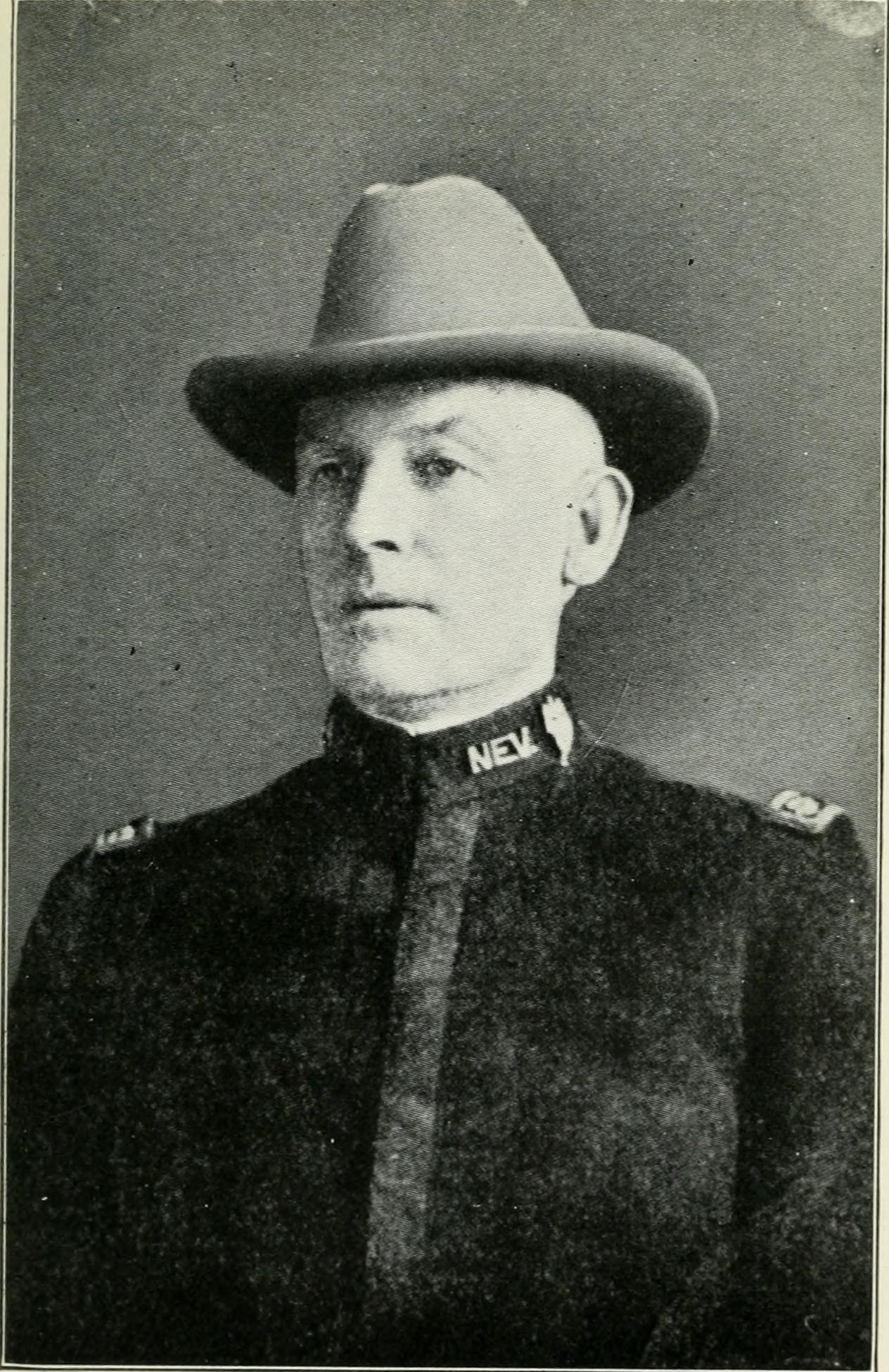
Captain J.P. Donnelly became the Nevada State Police Superintendent in 1911 and led a team to the Battle of Kelley Creek.

By 1934, the highway patrol force had grown to three officers still supervised by the Inspector of the State Police. They were given silver patrol cars with gold stars on the door, red lights and sirens, and told to patrol the roads. One officer was assigned to Las Vegas, Reno and Elko.

This part of the Nevada State Police remained operational until the State Police were reorganized in 1943. At that time, the Nevada State Highway Patrol was absorbed into the State Police who continued highway law enforcement until 1949 when the Nevada Highway Patrol was organized.

The 1949 Nevada Legislature created the Nevada Highway Patrol by consolidating the Nevada State Police, Inspectors from the Nevada Public Service Commission and several Inspectors from the Nevada Department of Taxation. On July 1, 1949, the Nevada Highway Patrol Division was created within the Nevada Public Service Commission. These officers were directed to act as field agents and inspectors in the enforcement of the State laws as they pertained to Nevada highways.

In 1957, the Legislature created the Department of Motor Vehicles and transferred the Nevada Highway Patrol to this new department as a division.

In 1985, the name of the department was changed to the Department of Motor Vehicles and Public Safety (DMV&PS) to reflect the law enforcement agencies that had been added. At the same time, Fifty-two Field Enforcement Agents of the Motor Carrier Division of the Department of Motor Vehicles were transferred to the Nevada Highway Patrol and consolidated with existing Commercial Vehicle Safety Officers of the Nevada Highway Patrol to form the Commercial Enforcement Bureau within the NHP.

In 2001, DMV&PS was split into separate departments and the Nevada Highway Patrol is now a division of the Nevada Department of Public Safety.

In 2005, NHP opened a new communications center and emergency operations center in Clark County.

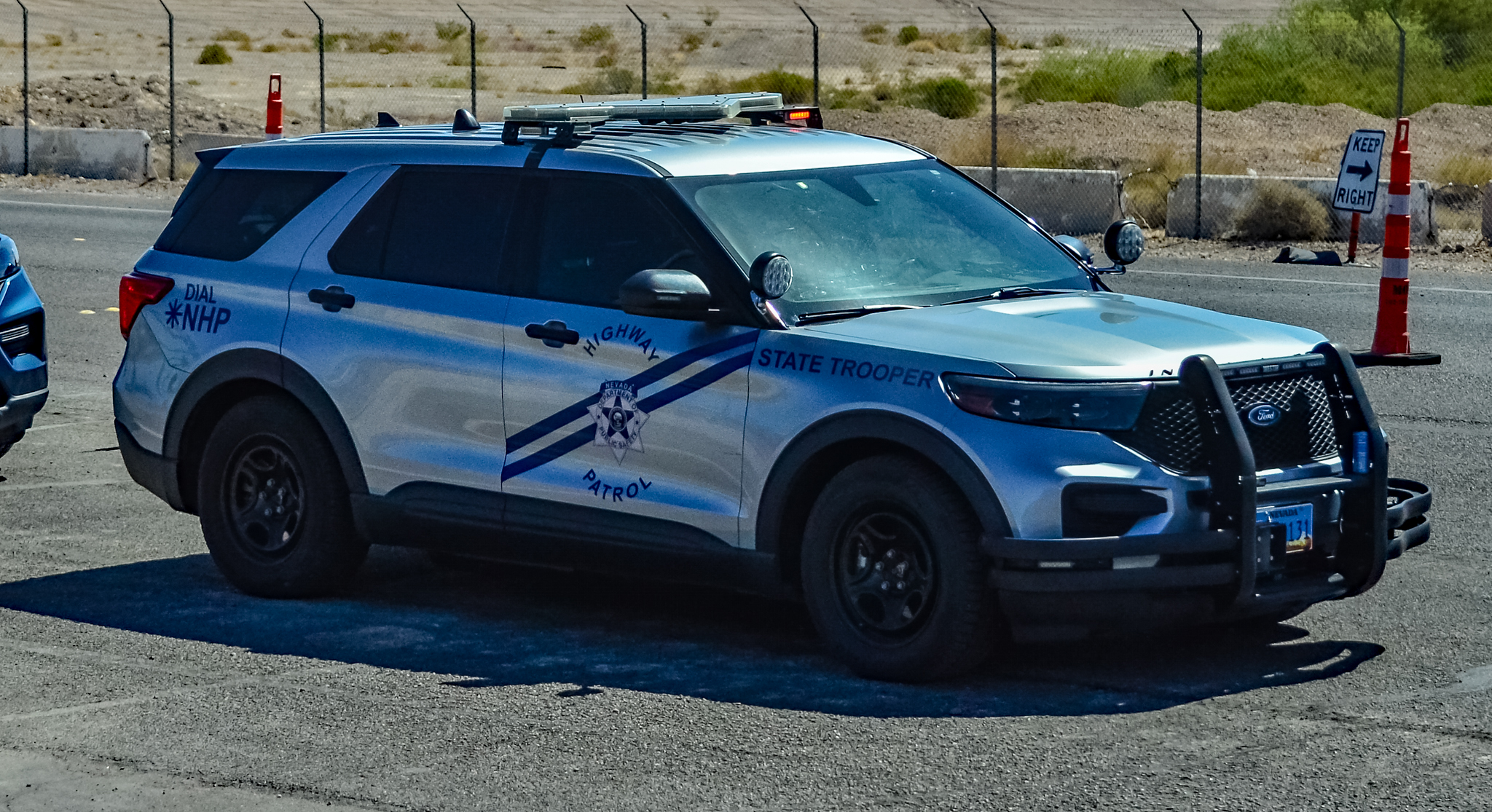
Standard patrol vehicle used by the Nevada Highway Patrol division of the Nevada State Police.

In 2007, DPS Northern Nevada Communications center moved from the Reno Northern Command Headquarters into the State Emergency Operations Center in Nevada's capital city, Carson City.

The Nevada Highway Patrol issues its officers a variety of non-lethal weapons, such as tasers, pepper spray, and a baton. The NHP also issues its troopers take-home cars.

In 2020, the first woman to lead the agency, Colonel Anne Carpenter, was appointed to oversee the agency's 491 sworn officers and 96 administrative employees on October 19. Carpenter had been an officer with the agency since 1995, working her way up to head of the parole division, then lieutenant in 2005 and captain in 2012. She led the agency until her retirement in November of 2021.

In 2021, the Nevada Department of Public Safety announced that the agency would rebrand from the Nevada Highway Patrol to the Nevada State Police.

In February 2021, the Nevada State Police seized $87,000 from a combat veteran without alleging any crimes. The veteran was traveling through Nevada to see his daughters in California, and sued the NSP to get his money back.

== Ranks ==
Title	Insignia	Notes
Superintendent		The superintendent is appointed by the director of the Nevada Department of Public Safety.
Assistant Superintendent		The assistant superintendent reports directly to the superintendent.
Major		Majors are responsible for a command.
Captain		A captain leads a field operations bureau or another division.
Lieutenant		A lieutenant is the assistant commander of a division/unit.
Sergeant		A sergeant supervises an entire patrol shift in their district.
Trooper	No Insignia	A trooper is a sworn officer having completed academy and field training.

== Commands ==
- Headquarters (Carson City)
- Northern Command (Reno)
- Southern Command (Las Vegas)

== Demographics ==
- Male: 94%
- Female: 6%
- White: 89%
- Hispanic: 5%
- African-American/Black: 3%
- Asian: 3%

== Flight operations ==
The NSP flight operations unit consisted of three fixed-wing aircraft. The aircraft were predominantly used for speed enforcement, prisoner transport and personnel transport. The planes were additionally used for emergency blood delivery and to assist other law enforcement agencies.

NSP discontinued use of their flight operations in 2010.

=== Fleet ===
- Cessna Skylane 182 RG based in Las Vegas
- Cessna Centurion 210 RG based in Carson City
- Cessna Cutlass 172 RG based in Elko

== Fallen officers ==
As of 2023, 12 officers have died while on duty since 1911—three by automobile accident, four from gunfire, two stricken by vehicles, three from vehicular assault.

== See also ==
- List of law enforcement agencies in Nevada
- Denver S. Dickerson
- Nevada Capitol Police
