= Henderson Fire Department =

Municipal fire department in Nevada, US

Operational area
- Country: United States
- State: Nevada
- City: Henderson

Agency overview
- Established: 1953
- Annual calls: 41,438 (2022)
- Employees: 232
- Annual budget: $69 million (2022)
- Staffing: Career
- Fire chief: Shawn White
- EMS level: ALS
- IAFF: 1883

Facilities and equipment
- Battalions: 2
- Stations: 12
- Engines: 12
- Trucks: 3
- Rescues: 15
- HAZMAT: 1

Website
- Official website
- IAFF website

The Henderson Fire Department (HFD) is the agency that provides fire protection and emergency medical services for the city of Henderson, the second largest city in Nevada with 336,534 residents spread out over 105.4 square miles (273 km^{2}).

== Stations and apparatus ==
Fire Station #	Address	Engine Company	Truck Company	EMS response unit	Other units	Notes
81	600 College Dr.	Engine 81		Rescue 81		
82	401 Parkson Rd.	Engine 82	Truck 82	Rescue 82 Rescue 282/Medic 82	Heavy Rescue 82, Battalion 8, Operations Support Officer (OSO)	Station 82 is also home to the department's Fire Training Center. Station 82 also houses the department's Reserve Engines and Rescues.
83	100 Burkholder Blvd.	Engine 83		Rescue 83, Rescue 283		
84	400 N. Valle Verde Dr.	Engine 84		Rescue 84, Rescue 284/Medic 84		
85	285 W. Horizon Dr.	Engine 85	Truck 85	Rescue 85	Trail Response Vehicle(TRV) 85	
86	1996 E. Galleria Dr.	Engine 86			TRV86, HPD/HFD shared Mobile Command Vehicle	
87	190 Cadence Crest Ave	Engine 87		Rescue 87		
91	2901 Democracy Dr.	Engine 91			TRV 91	
92	Larson and Via Centro(Station is currently under construction and does not have an official address yet)	Engine 92		Rescue 92		Station 92 is currently operating from a Temporary Station at the Debra March Center of Excellence on Via Inspirada
95	2300 Pebble Rd.	Engine 95		Rescue 95, Rescue 295/Medic 95	Battalion 9	
97	1550 Amador Ln.	Engine 97		Rescue 97, Rescue 297/Medic 97	Air Resource 97	
98	891 Coronado Center Dr.	Engine 98	Truck 98	Rescue 98, Rescue 298/Medic 98	HAZMAT 98,	
99	2401 Atchley Dr.	Engine 99		Rescue 99, Rescue 299/Medic 99	TRV 99	

== Notable fires fought ==
=== MGM Grand Fire ===
On November 21, 1980 the MGM Grand Hotel and Casino (now Bally's Las Vegas) in Paradise, Nevada suffered a major fire. The fire killed 85 people, most through smoke inhalation. The HFD was one of the main agencies to respond to fire which remains the worst disaster in Nevada history, and the third-worst hotel fire in modern U.S. history.

=== PEPCON Disaster ===
The PEPCON disaster was an industrial disaster that occurred in Henderson on May 4, 1988 at the Pacific Engineering and Production Company of Nevada (PEPCON) plant. The fire and subsequent explosions claimed two lives, injured 372 people, and caused an estimated US$100 million of damage. A large portion of the Las Vegas Valley within a 10 miles (16 km) radius of the plant was affected, and several agencies activated disaster plans.
