= Net metering in the United States =

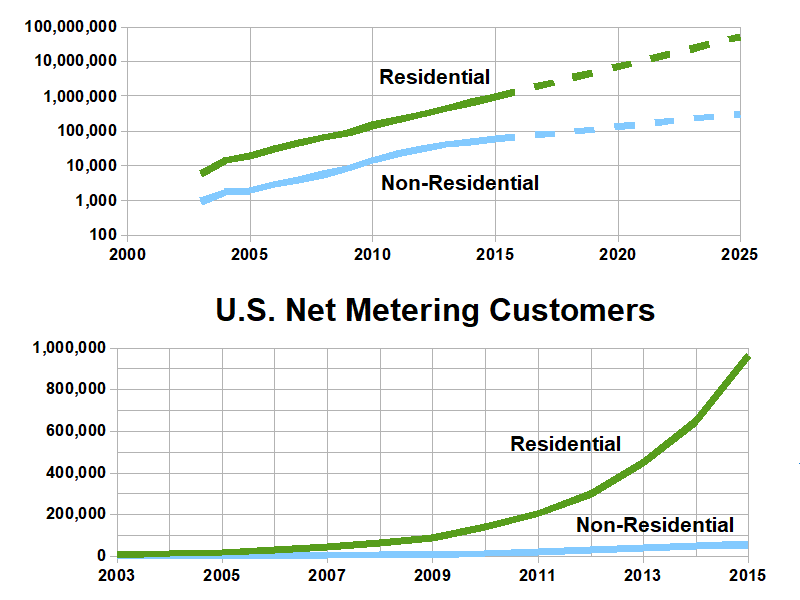
Growth of net metering in the United States

Net metering is a policy by many states in the United States designed to help the adoption of renewable energy. Net metering was pioneered in the United States as a way to allow solar and wind to provide electricity whenever available and allow use of that electricity whenever it was needed, beginning with utilities in Idaho in 1980, and in Arizona in 1981. In 1983, Minnesota passed the first state net metering law. As of March 2015, 44 states and Washington, D.C. have developed mandatory net metering rules for at least some utilities. However, although the states' rules are clear, few utilities actually compensate at full retail rates.

Net metering policies are determined by states, which have set policies varying on a number of key dimensions. The Energy Policy Act of 2005 required state electricity regulators to "consider" (but not necessarily implement) rules that mandate public electric utilities make net metering available to their customers upon request. Several legislative bills have been proposed to institute a federal standard limit on net metering. They range from H.R. 729, which sets a net metering cap at 2% of forecasted aggregate customer peak demand, to H.R. 1945, which has no aggregate cap, but does limit residential users to 10 kW, a low limit compared to many states, such as New Mexico, with an 80,000 kW limit, or states such as Arizona, Colorado, New Jersey, and Ohio, which limit as a percentage of load.

== Policies by state ==
Arizona, California, Colorado, Connecticut, Delaware, Maryland, Massachusetts, New Hampshire, New Jersey, New York, Ohio, Oregon, Pennsylvania, Utah, Vermont, and West Virginia are considered the most favorable states for net metering, as they are the only states to receive an "A" rating from Freeing the Grid in 2015.

Regulators in multiple states are acting as "referees" in debates between utility companies and advocates of distributed resources, such as solar panel arrays. In 2016 the National Association of Regulatory Utility Commissioners (NARUC) published the Manual on Distributed Energy Resources Compensation as a way to help states decide on rate structures dealing with homes and businesses that generate their own power and send excess power back to the electric grid. The intention behind the manual is to "provide a consistent framework for evaluating rate design decisions in the age of distributed energy resources." The president of NARUC, when he commissioned the manual, said his instructions to the committee writing the manual were to write a "practical, expert and most importantly ideologically neutral guide that offers advice" to states. A draft of the manual was released in July, which generated more than 70 public comments from stakeholder groups. Those comments were reviewed, and the final version of the manual was designed. The updated manual covers various issues that state regulators have been struggling with including net metering, the value of solar energy, and cost shifting from DER to non-DER customers. DER is being integrated into the national grid at a rapid pace, and the system of electricity generation, delivery, and utilization are constantly changing with new technology.

The Edison Electric Institute and the Solar Energy Industries Association both supported the manual. However, the main point of contention between utility companies and the solar industry is the question of whether distributed generation systems represent cost shift from those with the systems (people with solar panels) to those without them (everyone else who uses electricity).

Phil Moeller of the Edison Electric Institute said, "We want to DER [distributed energy resources] but we want to make sure the rate structure is right to minimize cost shifts." Moeller is a former member of the Federal Energy Regulatory Commission (FERC), a federal government regulatory agency. Sean Gallaher of the Solar Energy Industries Association said, "There seems to be an assumption that revenue erosion from DER results in an inadequacy of cost recovery for the utility and therefore a shift of costs to non-participating customers. You can't just assume that."

State	Subscriber limit (% of peak)	Power limit Res/Com(kW)	Monthly rollover	Annual compensation
Alabama	no limit	100	yes, can be indefinitely	varies
Alaska	1.5	25	yes, indefinitely	retail rate
Arizona	no limit	125% of load	yes, avoided-cost at end of billing year	avoided cost
Arkansas	no limit	25/300	yes, until end of billing year	retail rate
California	5	1,000	yes, can be indefinitely	varies
Colorado	no limit	120% of load or 10/25*	yes, indefinitely	varies*
Connecticut	no limit	2,000	yes, avoided-cost at end of billing year	retail rate
Delaware	5	25/500 or 2,000*	yes, but banked kWh expire yearly on 31 Mar.	retail rate
District of Columbia	no limit	1,000	yes, indefinitely	retail rate
Florida	no limit	2,000	yes, avoided-cost at end of billing year	retail rate
Georgia	0.2	10/100	no	determined rate
Hawaii	none	50 or 100*	yes, until end of billing year	none
Idaho	0.1	25 or 25/100*	no	retail rate or avoided-cost*
Illinois	1	40	yes, until end of billing year	retail rate
Indiana	1	1000	yes, indefinitely	retail rate
Iowa	no limit	500	yes, indefinitely	retail rate
Kansas	1	25/200	yes, until end of billing year	retail rate
Kentucky	1	30	yes, indefinitely	avoided cost
Louisiana	no limit	25/300	yes, indefinitely	avoided cost
Maine	no limit	100 or 660*	yes, until end of billing year	retail rate
Maryland	1500 MW	2,000	yes, until end of billing year	retail rate
Massachusetts**	6 peak demand 4 private 5 public	60, 1,000 or 2,000	varies	varies
Michigan	0.75	150	yes, indefinitely	partial retail rate
Minnesota	no limit	40	no	retail rate
Mississippi	—N/a	—N/a	—N/a	wholesale rate plus 2.5 cents per kwh standard, plus an additional 2.0 cents for low income customers
Missouri	5	100	yes, until end of billing year	avoided-cost
Montana	no limit	50	yes, until end of billing year	lost
Nebraska	1	25	yes, until end of billing year	avoided-cost
Nevada	3	1,000	yes, indefinitely	retail rate
New Hampshire	1	100/1,000	yes, indefinitely	avoided-cost
New Jersey	no limit	previous years consumption	yes, avoided-cost at end of billing year	retail rate
New Mexico	no limit	80,000	if under US$50	avoided-cost
New York	1 or 0.3 (wind)	10 to 2,000 or peak load	varies	avoided-cost or retail rate
North Carolina	no limit	1000	yes, until summer billing season	retail rate
North Dakota	no limit	100	no	avoided-cost
Ohio	no limit	no explicit limit	yes, until end of billing year	generation rate
Oklahoma	no limit	100 or 25,000/year	no	avoided-cost, but utility not required to purchase
Oregon	0.5 or no limit*	10/25 or 25/2,000*	yes, until end of billing year*	varies
Pennsylvania	no limit	50/3,000 or 5,000	yes, until end of billing year.	"price-to-compare" (generation and transmission cost)
Rhode Island	2	1,650 for most, 2250 or 3500*	optional	slightly less than retail rate
South Carolina	0.2	20/100	yes, until summer billing season	time-of-rate use or less
South Dakota	—N/a	—N/a	—N/a	—N/a
Tennessee	—N/a	—N/a	—N/a	—N/a
Texas***	no limit	20 or 25	no	varies
Utah	varies*	25/2,000 or 10*	varies - credits expire annually with the March billing*	avoided-cost or retail rate*
Vermont	15	250	yes, accumulated up to 12 months, rolling	retail rate
Virginia	1	10/500	yes, avoided-cost option at end of billing year	retail rate
Washington	4.0 percent of the utility's peak demand during 1996	100	yes, until end of billing year	retail rate
West Virginia	0.1	25	yes, up to twelve months	retail rate
Wisconsin	no limit	20	no	retail rate for renewables, avoided-cost for non-renewables
Wyoming	no limit	25	yes, avoided-cost at end of billing year	retail rate

Note: Some additional minor variations not listed in this table may apply. N/A = Not available. Lost = Excess electricity credit or credit not claimed is granted to utility. Retail rate = Final sale price of electricity. Avoided-cost = "Wholesale" price of electricity (cost to the utility).
* = Depending on utility.
** = Massachusetts distinguishes policies for different "classes" of systems.
*** = Only available to customers of Austin Energy, CPS Energy, or retail electric providers in Oncor service areas such as TXU Energy, Reliant Energy, Shell Energy, or Green Mountain Energy (Green Mountain Energy is not a utility but a retail electric provider; according to www.powertochoose.com).

== Successor tariffs and net billing ==
Beginning in the late 2010s, several states replaced traditional retail-rate net metering with successor tariffs that compensate electricity exported to the grid at a separately calculated rate, a structure often described as net billing.

=== California ===
In December 2022, the California Public Utilities Commission (CPUC) adopted Decision D.22-12-056, creating a Net Billing Tariff, informally called "NEM 3.0" to succeed NEM 2.0 for new interconnection applicants effective April 15, 2023. Under the tariff, exported electricity is credited at values derived from the commission's Avoided Cost Calculator rather than at the retail rate, cutting average export compensation by about 75 percent, from roughly $0.30 per kWh to about $0.08 per kWh. The tariff applies in the service territories of the state's three large investor-owned utilities: Pacific Gas and Electric, Southern California Edison, and San Diego Gas & Electric. Municipal utilities set their own customer-generation rules. Customers already enrolled in NEM 1.0 or NEM 2.0 remain on those tariffs for 20 years from their interconnection date.

The decision drew criticism from solar advocates. Bernadette Del Chiaro, executive director of the California Solar & Storage Association, said the decision "would really hurt" and warned it did not support a growing solar market. The CPUC said the tariff would still lead to an average payback of nine years for residential rooftop solar, based on an assumed installed cost of $3.30 per watt.

== Characteristics of each state ==
=== Arizona ===
Net metering in Arizona is a public policy and political issue regarding the rates that Arizona utility companies pay solar customers sell excess energy back to the electrical grid. The issue has two political sides: utility companies that to pay solar customers the "wholesale rate" for their excess electricity, and solar panel installers and solar customers who want utility companies to pay the "retail rate" (higher than the wholesale rate).

Under net metering, utility customers with solar panels get a credit for the energy they send back to the grid. The credit offsets the energy that they use from the grid. According to The Arizona Republic, "Utilities view net metering as a subsidy because they essentially pay retail rates for power from rooftop solar panels when they could purchase wholesale power much more cheaply, even from renewable sources." Solar companies take the opposite view; net metering is not a subsidy and without customers being able to get a credit for their excess energy, they wouldn't save money on their electric bills (and hence, would have much less or little incentive to install solar panels in the first place).

=== Arkansas ===
In 2016, the Arkansas state legislature enacted Act 827, which directed the Arkansas Public Service Commission to review changes to the state's net metering system. In March 2017, regulators decided to "grandfather existing solar customers into retail net metering rates for the next 20 years." Another decision made by the commission would allow the original net metering rates to stay with the home if it is sold. According to Utility Dive, "There are relatively few solar customers in Arkansas, and advocates worry changes in the next part of the proceeding could slow the market's growth if regulators make too deep a cut to remuneration rates."

In Arkansas, early in 2017 state regulators voted to grandfather existing solar customers into the current retail net metering rate until 2037. The Arkansas Public Service Commission convened a working group to look at the costs and benefits of net metering; the working group was split along ideological lines and each of two subgroups submitted its own set of recommendations instead of having a unified position. The first subgroup, composed of conservation and advanced energy groups, wanted no changes to the state's net metering rates. The second subgroup, made up of public utilities, wanted to have an embedded cost service approach that would determine the costs and benefits associated with that metering. Entergy was a part of the second subgroup and said "the current net-metering policy that credits excess generation at the full retail rate must be changed for new net-metering customers."

That second group "argued that crediting net-metering customers for costs that are not avoided 'means that the electric utility does not recover its entire cost of providing service to each net-metering customer, net of quantifiable benefits.'"

=== California ===
As of October 2018, net metering is up for debate again in California.

In late 2015, three utilities in California proposed alternative methods of compensation to solar users for the excess energy recycled back to the grid. This followed new regulatory decisions on solar net metering policies. In December 2015, a policy that would protect retail net metering for rooftop solar consumers was proposed by the California Public Utilities Commission (CPUC). When asked for their commentary, the utilities responded with lower remuneration rates for solar consumers in exchange for contributing to grid upkeep costs.

In an attempt to establish fairness and balance between solar installers and utilities, the CPUC proposed to continue with retail rate net metering with minimal changes for rooftop solar customers in California. According to the Los Angeles Times, solar energy supporters rallied at a hearing at CPUC vowing to "gut" net metering and complicate newly proposed utility policies. California utilities were dissatisfied with the proposal. According to San Diego Gas & Electric, the proposal did not address the "growing cost burden" on their customers, which is estimated at $100 per month or, collectively, $160 million per year.

A proposal set forth by the utilities offered to charge both residential and commercial net metering customers their "otherwise applicable rate" for the kilowatt-hours of electricity used from the grid. A fixed export compensation rate for exported energy over a 10-year period would also be imposed. The export rate would amount to $0.15/kWh for installations until the distributed power exceeded 7% of the utility's customer demand. Subsequently, the rate would fall to $0.13/kWh.

Throughout 2017, California implemented "Net Metering 2.0" where the compensation to solar customers is close to retail rates. The policy also moved time-of-use (TOU) rates for residential customers. Additionally, the rates were updated to reflect "conditions on California's grid."

The California Public Utilities Commission (CPUC) approved new TOU rates for San Diego Gas & Electric Company and moved the start of the peak period to 4 pm (four hours later than it was prior to the change). The Solar Energy Industries Association believes the new peak rates are too late in the day.

In October 2017, CPUC extended the grandfathering period for many distributed PV systems to the old rates and eliminated completion deadlines for "qualifying PV systems." Grandfathered rates will last five years for residential customers and 10 years for other customers. However by 2021, grandfathered rates for all NEM 1.0 and NEM 2.0 were extended to 20 years from the date of activation.

In December 2022, the CPUC voted to replace NEM 2.0 with a net billing tariff ("NEM 3.0") for new applicants; see Successor tariffs and net billing.

=== Florida ===
In early 2016, lawmakers in Florida, with encouragement from both houses, voted to put Amendment 4 on the ballot. In a state that is presently faced with various renewable energy issues, the idea of terminating personal property taxes on solar panels was widely supported. One of the sponsors of the bill backing Amendment 4, state Senator Jeff Brandes (R), said that the decision will aid in the development of renewable and solar energy statewide and lead to the creation of thousands of job opportunities.

On August 30, 2016, a proposition that will dispose of property taxes on both commercial and industrial solar panels was approved by Florida voters. The initiative to revitalize renewable energy efforts garnered overwhelming bipartisan support. According to Florida Politics, on August 30, 2016, Amendment 4 accumulated almost 75 percent of the votes cast, surpassing the 60 percent minimum required. The ongoing debate regarding solar energy remains a major issue, with utility-supported policies expected to face scrutiny and resistance.

=== Guam ===
Net metering was established in Guam in 2004, with 1,700 customers as of September 2018. Net metering will be reduced over a five-year period from 2019 to compensate customer-generators for avoided cost instead.

=== Hawaii ===
Due to the effect of electrical back feed which happened when the utility grid flooded with solar electricity. The Hawaii Public Utilities Commission eliminated retail net metering in 2015. When it did so, it replaced net metering with a "Customer Grid Supply" (CGS) and a "Customer Self Supply" (CSS) option. Since the elimination of net metering in 2015, Hawaii regulators have capped the number of solar customers who can send their excess energy back into the grid. Those customers are in the CGS program. Other customers in the CSS option use residential energy storage instead of sending their energy back into the grid. Beginning October 2018, The Hawaii Public Utilities Commission Approved a program Called NEM Plus which allows existing NEM customers to install additional Solar PV provided that the additional capacity does NOT export more power back to grid than was approved on the original NEM contract. This requires the use of curtailment controls and will allow the customer to integrate batteries to store the surplus capacity.

=== Idaho ===
Approximately 1,400 people in Idaho are enrolled in net metering. Most of these customers use of rooftop solar systems. Idaho Power says that the current net metering system was not created to account for homeowners who installed their own solar panels, and as such, traditional power customers are "being forced to make up any budget shortfalls."

In 2017 Idaho Power requested to create a new class of customers starting January 1, 2018. By doing so, Idaho Power could introduce possible rate hikes for that new class of customers, more than what they currently pay to access the state's power grid and buy electricity when their own solar panels are not producing electricity. The Idaho Public Utilities Commission said that it will hold a hearing in March 2018 before coming to a decision on Idaho Power's request.

=== Indiana ===
In Indiana, solar energy makes up less than one percent of the state's energy consumption. In Indianapolis, for example, Indianapolis Power & Light has roughly 100 solar customers.

In February 2017, the state Senate approved by a vote of 39-9 Senate Bill 309 which would roll back net metering in Indiana. The bill "would ultimately reduce the rate paid to net metering customers from the retail rate to the utility's marginal cost, plus 25%." People who already use solar power with net metering would be grandfathered for ten years at the current rate. The Sierra Club's "Beyond Coal" campaign ran a radio ad campaign to oppose the bill.

In April 2017, the state House passed their own version of the bill.

As of 2018, a new net metering law is "limiting net metering benefits, but anyone with solar panels installed before January 1, 2018, was able to secure the credit for 30 years. After this date, the credit will be secure for 15 years."

As of January 2018, dozens of homeowner associations across central Indiana put up barriers to residential solar installations, according to the Indianapolis Star. "With hundreds of Homeowners Associations across just Central Indiana, a review suggests that as many as half don't allow panels at all while the others have weak or limiting language that leaves architectural review committees to make decisions devoid of objective criteria."

=== Kansas ===
Kansas Corporation Commission approved demand charges for solar net metering customers of Kansas City Power & Light and Westar Energy fall of 2018. Early 2019 the Clean Energy Business Council (CEBC) introduced SB 124 to remove the punitive charges on solar customers. March 2019 - Evergy (Westar & KCP&L) agreed to file a new tariff with the KCC grandfathering Westar customers who installed solar prior to January 10, 2018, and KCP&L customers who installed prior to 12/20/18, into the old rate thereby eliminating their demand charges. To make further progress, the agreement included a commitment by Evergy to collaborate with the CEBC to find reasonable solutions that allow the solar industry to grow. May 17, 2019 - Westar's tariff to grandfather existing customers was filed. The two utilities together provide about one-third of electricity to Kansas. Commercial and industrial customers of the utilities would not be affected by the demand fees.

The demand fee proposals would charge customers nine dollars per kilowatt during four summer months. Customers will be charged two dollars or three dollars per kilowatt during the remaining months of the year. Households with a smaller number of solar panels would likely see their rates go up under the proposal. The utility companies say that the demand fees are necessary because all customers must contribute to pay for the system that is capable of meeting spikes in demand. Customers who use a small amount of electricity because they produce some of their own via solar panels do not pay enough to cover their portion of transmission and distribution systems, according to the utility companies. The Demand Fees were allowed because of a 2014 law which allowed solar customers to be charged "differently".

The legality of Demand Fees were questioned in court by the Sierra Club and Earthjustice on the basis that an existing law from 1980 guaranteed that customers who generated renewable energy couldn't be charged more than customers who didn't. Although the Sierra Club lost in both the lower and appellate courts, they persisted until the Kansas Supreme Court heard the case. The Kansas Supreme Court ruled on 3 April 2020 that the 1980 law was still in effect. The 2014 law allowed the utility company to charge solar customers "differently" but not MORE. Eventually, the KCC ruled that Westar (now Evergy) had to give back the Demand Fees which they collected.

=== Kentucky ===
In early 2018, a bill was proposed in the Kentucky Legislature that could dramatically alter net metering within the state. House Bill 227 would reduce the credit that rooftop solar owners receive when they send electricity back to the grid by as much as 65 percent.

HB 227 is moving across the legislature. Tyler White, the president of the Kentucky Coal Association, who supports the bill, has said that net metering is paramount to a renewable energy subsidy. The reason is because only some people (those without solar) pay to maintain the electric grid, while others (those with solar power systems) do not, despite the fact that everyone uses the grid. According to White, "Germany has spent hundreds of billions of dollars on solar and wind, yet they provide only 3 percent of its total energy. The average German pays 3 times more for electricity than the average American." In Kentucky, there are more than 2.2 million utility customers; there are less than 1,000 private net metered customers, and half of them are located in Lexington and Louisville. White argues that a vote in favor of HB 227 is "a vote to make sure the people of Eastern Kentucky are not paying more on their utility bills to fund the growth of private solar for the wealthy in Lexington and Louisville."

By March 2018, Kentucky legislators "continue to wrestle over a plan to sharply reduce the amount utilities pay customers who sell excess solar power to their local utilities." The bill was approved by the House Natural Resources and Energy Committee but has not yet been debated on or voted on in the Kentucky House of Representatives. According to Daily Energy Insider, "A major question is whether, under the state’s current net metering law, the vast majority of ratepayers are subsidizing the cost of maintaining the regional grid for the relatively few customers with solar energy systems who are connected to it."

In Kentucky, homeowners who have rooftop solar sell their surplus electricity back to utility companies at the retail rate (the rate the utility charges the customer, not the rate the utility purchases electricity).

=== Maine ===
A coalition of pro-solar groups filed a lawsuit in September 2018 against the Maine Public Utilities Commission. The coalition argued that regulators violated the law when they approved rules that would increase the costs of solar customers connecting to the electric grid.

In Maine, the two major issues regarding retail rates and net metering programs were how to deal with CMP reaching 1 percent of peak load net metering cap and the real value of solar. The Alliance for Solar Choice stated that it would prefer to see net metering kept intact until the policy produces solar growth.

In 2016, solar companies and major utility companies came to a legislative agreement over net metering issues. The two sides said that their deal might increase solar power in Maine "tenfold in five years." In response, several national solar companies paid for lobbyists to travel to Maine and attempt to persuade state legislators to stop the deal. The legislation would replace net metering with a concept referred to as "next metering." Under next metering, regulators would set the rates that utilities pay residential solar customers for the customers' excess energy. (Under normal net metering, utilities would pay the wholesale rate). The legislation includes a grandfather clause for existing solar customers.

Maine is considering changing its net metering energy billing rules. On September 13, 2016, the Maine Public Utilities Commission proposed a new rule, and then held a public hearing on October 17. The proposal would consider changing net metering billing rules and is expected to be completed in early 2017.

In the Maine legislature, Assistant Majority Leader Sara Gideon (D-Freeport) introduced a new bill to increase Maine's solar industry tenfold and implement a market-based program, replacing the current net metering policy. In 2015–2016 in Maine, a collective group of environmentalists, consumer representatives, installers of solar power, and utilities proposed a bill in the state legislature suggesting the replacement of net metering with a market-based "pay for production" program. One provision of the bill proposes that Central Maine Power (CMP) and Emera, Maine's two main utilities, establish long-term contracts with utility developers and solar owners allowing them to purchase solar power generation. Subsequently, they would bid the generation into New England electricity markets. This arrangement could last existing net metering customers up to 12 years. A competitively set regulated price would be paid by the aggregators in order to compensate for owner costs. In turn, the utility aggregators would capitalize on the return on sales.

In March 2017, state legislators in both the Maine state House and Senate began writing legislation that would preserve retail net metering. The bills would make it temporary in the short term. In early 2017, the Maine Public Utilities Commission approved new limits that will eventually phase out net metering, beginning in 2018. The House bill would "fully save retail net metering." A group called the Maine Environmental Priorities Coalition supports the legislation. The Senate bill would reinstate net metering while regulators examine "how advanced metering can help better determine the costs and benefits of rooftop solar." The solar industry is supporting that bill. In February 2017, a group called the Natural Resources Council of Maine "vowed to continue fighting new net metering restrictions."

In December 2017, the Maine Public Utilities Commission voted to delay implementing the state's new solar rules, which would phase down the net metering compensation for rooftop solar customers. Net metering supporters, led by the Conservation Law Foundation, filed a lawsuit to overturn the PUC's decision. The Maine Supreme Judicial Court has heard arguments on the case on December 13, 2017.

The Maine legislature tried to reverse the course set by the PUC by passing a bill to roll back the PUC's decision to phase down net metering. The bill passed the legislature but was vetoed by Governor Paul LePage.

=== Massachusetts ===
Massachusetts law allows net metering for any kind of generation technology (even non-renewable), up to 60 kW in capacity. Solar, wind, and anaerobic digestion facilities are eligible for much higher caps, depending on whether they are privately or publicly owned. Privately owned generation facilities must be under 2 MW and publicly owned under 10 MW. The total cap on net metering was established in state law in April 2016. For the private sector, it set the cap at 7% of historic peak load. For the public sector the cap is 8% of historic peak load. These values are calculated for each electric company in the state. This means, the net metering cap is different in different parts of that state (served by different electric companies). For example, the cap for private generation on Nantucket is only 3.5 MW, but for western Massachusetts it is 59.78 MW.

In January 2018, the Massachusetts Department of Public Utilities (DPU) approved demand charges for Eversource utility's net metering customers. DPU also got rid of optional time-of-use rates for residential customers. Among renewable and clean energy advocates, demand charges are "very controversial." DPU's decision has set the stage for intense debate over rate design. Eversource had argued it faced "displaced distribution revenues" of more than $8 million per year that should be collected from net-metered customers. The DPU agreed, saying "the companies have demonstrated a cost shift from net metering to non-net metering customers by identifying costs directly imposed by net metering facilities on the distribution system."

=== Michigan ===
In 2009, Michigan's net metering program began with the enactment of Public Act 295 of 2008, which was signed into law on October 6, 2008 by Governor Jennifer Granholm. According to the state of Michigan, "The Act promotes the development of clean and renewable energy and energy optimization through the implementation of standards that will cost-effectively provide greater energy security and diversify the energy resources used to meet consumers' needs, encourage private investment in renewable energy and energy efficiency and improve air quality."

The law also mandated that 10 percent of the state's electric power be generated from renewable sources by the year 2015. Net metering customers would procure credit for excess energy returned to the grid at retail rates. "Programs are capped at 1 percent of a regulated utility's peak demand, which is further broken down into categories for small and larger-scale installations," according to Midwest Energy News.

In 2015, net metering in Michigan increased by 20 percent. Net metering installations rose 3 megawatts to approximately 17 megawatts of generation. According to the Michigan Public Service Commission (MPSC), net metering increased from 1,840 customers and 1,947 installations in 2014 to 2,155 customers and 2,289 in 2015. Michigan Energy Innovation Business Council President Liesl Eichler Clark stated, "Yet again, we are seeing that Michigan ratepayers are turning to solar power and on-site renewables. As more and more homeowners and businesses make the switch, the solar contagion effect becomes increasingly apparent."

In June 2018, the Michigan Public Service Commission decided to end net metering for new solar installations. Existing residential solar customers would have ten more years of net metering. Companies that install solar panels expect that the new policy will hurt their business. Michigan utility companies such as Consumers Energy and DTE Energy argue that other customers are subsidizing the customers [who have] solar. According to Michigan NPR, utility companies "say paying solar customers the retail rate for power ignores the utility companies’ costs of maintaining the power lines and the power plants that provide the minimum baseload required to keep the power operating."

The Michigan Public Service Commission Is calculating a new rate to pay solar customers who send energy back to the grid; the commission is using measurements of inflow and outflow of electricity to calculate the rate. In other states that have ended net metering, the new rates range from 75 to 95% of the retail rate. The reason that the Michigan Public Service Commission is ending net metering is that in 2016, the state legislature called on the commission to come up with a study on the best way to measure and compensate for electricity from residential solar customers.

The plans have been met with resistance from solar advocates who worry that the new program will "slow the rooftop industry to a crawl in the state." The Michigan Public Service Commission reported that the amount of installed solar grew from 361 MW at the end of 2015 to 580 MW in 2016. It projects that when the 2017 numbers are in, that number will grow to 1.2 GW. Currently, utilities pay the retail rate back to Michigan's solar customers for excess electricity that they generate and sell back to the grid.

In January 2018, officials in Ann Arbor, Michigan amended local zoning rules to prohibit ground-mounted solar panels in front yards, citing public safety.

=== Missouri ===
In the spring of 2016, the city of Mt. Vernon, Missouri created a local net metering program. The local board of aldermen passed a measure on May 16, 2016, that allows for residents and businesses to apply to "generate their own electricity while staying connected to the Mt. Vernon power grid." The board took up the issue after city residents asked about regulations regarding hooking up their own solar panels. The town's program would allow net metering, but consumers must pay for their own equipment including a bi-directional meter. Participants would pay for power from the city at the regular rate that any other city consumer would pay. Participants who create excess power would receive a credit on their utility bill, equal to what the city pays for the electricity at a wholesale rate from the distributor Empire.

In 2017, a bill was proposed in the state House (House Bill 340) that would give utility companies permission to increase fixed charges for rooftop solar customers by up to 75 percent. The bill also would allow the Missouri Public Service Commission to require solar customers to maintain a "reasonable amount of liability insurance coverage or other equivalent respecting the installation and operation of the qualified electric energy generation unit."

According to Utility Dive, the debate "mirrors net metering issues taken up in other states."

=== Montana ===
In January 2017, the Energy and Technology Interim Committee (ETIC) in the Montana legislature passed HB 52, a bill which grandfathers net metering rates to solar customers. The bill passed with unanimous support. The bill was supported by NorthWestern Energy; however, a second bill did not have as much success. Bill HB 34 would have raised the net metering cap from 50 kW to 250 kW for government buildings.

As of February 2017, the net metering policy in Montana gives credits on energy bills for energy produced that flows back to the grid for customers with wind, solar, or hydropower systems. The credits given to customers are equivalent to the retail rate of electricity.

There are at least two bills in the state legislature that would change that rate. Senate Bill 7, sponsored by Sen. Pat Connell (R-Hamilton) would ban net metering customers from being subsidized other customers of the utility company. Senate Bill 78, sponsored by Sen. Keith Regier (R-Kalispell) would require the Montana Public Service Commission to create a separate rate class for net metering customers by January 1, 2018. Under the bill, power produced by net metering customers would be valued at the wholesale rate and net metering customers to pay a monthly service charge to help pay for the fixed costs of the public utility's operation.

=== Nebraska ===
In Nebraska, "customer-owned renewable energy generation" can be included under the state's net metering system. However, eligible systems are limited to a rated capacity at or below 25 kilowatts. The energy can be generated from a variety of renewable sources including solar, wind, and hydro.

=== Nevada ===
The state of Nevada implemented net metering in 1997. Up until 2016, utility companies in Nevada paid the retail electricity rate to net metering consumers. Nevada's utilities pay net metering customers an average of $623 per year in southern Nevada and $471 per year in northern Nevada. (The major utility company in Nevada is NV Energy.)

The Nevada legislature passed legislation in 2015 that required the Nevada Public Utilities Commission to study the electric rate structure and come up with ways to shift costs. In December 2015, the commission updated the regulations so that utility companies would pay the wholesale rate to net metering consumers.

The group Greenpeace and Senator Harry Reid, the Democratic leader in the U.S. Senate, expressed opposition to the commission's ruling.

On December 22, 2016, the Nevada Public Utilities Commission unanimously decided to eliminate the previous rate structure that went into effect in 2015, which contributed to the collapse of Nevada's rooftop solar industry. The decision allows the state's solar market to be restored. The ruling determined that the rate would decrease from 11 cents per kilowatt-hour to 2.6 cents, while the monthly service fee increase from $12.75 to $38.51.

In June 2017, the legislature approved several bills intended to "advance access to clean energy, including measures aimed at boosting the value of rooftop solar, while increasing the state's renewable energy goals." According to Utility DIVE, "Clean energy advocates are hailing several pieces of legislation that will help turn around Nevada's image as being unfriendly to renewable energy." The state Senate unanimously approved AB405 to restore net metering rates paid by utility companies to rooftop solar companies; the rate utilities would have to pay to buy back energy would be close to the "retail rate" that customers pay utilities, instead of the wholesale rate that utility companies pay to get electricity. The bill was signed by Governor Brian Sandoval

Sunrun and SolarCity, companies that install rooftop solar panel, both left the state after the Nevada Public Utilities Commission 2015 decision. However, both companies said they would return after AB405 is signed into law.

=== New Hampshire ===
In many states, such as New Hampshire, solar companies and utility companies are coming to the negotiation table with compromises over net metering rates. In New Hampshire, proposals put forth by both the solar companies and the utility companies in March 2017 mostly found a lot of common ground.

Both the utility companies and solar companies in New Hampshire filed proposals regarding a settlement over how customers will be compensated in the future over distributed solar systems. The proposals include compensation rate changes for rooftop solar owners, establish time-of-use rate pilot projects, and continue non-bypassable charges for solar customers. Solar companies proposed to cut the distribution credit by half in 2019; utility companies proposed to eliminate the credit completely.

Under the original policy, rooftop solar customers could net credits annually at the retail rate which is $.17 per kilowatt hour in New Hampshire. Customers could "bank them" and use them later. Utilities propose to eliminate this provision, instead crediting customers for the excess energy they generate, along with a transmission credit.

In March 2018 the New Hampshire Senate passed a bill that would let larger electric generators get compensated for the excess power they feed into the electric grid above what the owners use. Under the current law, generators of up to 1 megawatt are eligible for net metering. The Senate proposal would raise the cap to allow projects of up to 5 megawatts. "While net metering legislation often focuses on homeowners’ rooftop solar installations, this bill is intended to provide an incentive for developers to install bigger systems, projects that could serve communities and large companies. It also would encompass some small-scale hydropower projects that already exist in the state."

Governor John Sununu vetoed Senate Bill 446, which would have expanded the state's net metering program. To accomplish that, the bill would increase the size limit for net metered projects from 1 MW to 5 MW. In August 2018, state senator Bob Giuda, one of the sponsors of the bill, pushed for the legislature to override the governor's veto.

In 2018, two candidates running for the Democratic nomination for governor, Molly Kelly and Steve Marchand, "talk[ed] about an energy policy issue that rarely makes national headlines: net metering. It's a state program that lets electric ratepayers generate their own power, and put it back into the grid in exchange for lower energy costs." Kelly was the original architect of New Hampshire's net metering law, which some municipalities such as Nashua hoped would expand, under a bill that saw bipartisan support during the 2018 legislative session. Governor Chris Sununu vetoed that bill. However, the legislature may try to override the veto.

=== New Mexico ===
Net metering in New Mexico is a set of state public policies that govern the relationship between solar customers (and customers with other types of renewable energy systems) and electric utility companies.

=== North Carolina ===
In June 2017, the North Carolina House of Representatives took action on a bill, HB589. First, the bill would try to create a process for competitive bidding among solar developers. Second, it would create a solar leasing program.

The bill passed by a vote of 108–11. As of June 8, the state Senate was expected to consider the bill the following week, but the bill, according to news reports, would face a harder time getting passed in the state Senate. Gov. Roy Cooper has said he supports the legislation.

According to Utility DIVE, "The legislation proposes a competitive bidding process for independent solar developers that lawmakers say will help keep costs down by using market-driven solutions to develop renewable projects. The bill would also create a Green Source Rider Program to allows large utility customers to take control of their energy purchasing."

The federal Public Utility Regulatory Policies Act makes it mandatory for utility companies to purchase renewable energy from independent power developers. HB589 would allow utility companies to work with state regulators to propose a program that would "procure renewable energy at a competitive rate." Utility companies would then be allowed to compete and bid against third-party energy developers. Duke Energy proposed a measure in 2016 that is similar to the bill (the North Carolina Utilities Commission rejected a similar measure in 2014).

Additionally, the bill would create a program for solar panel leasing. The intent is to create a competitive market to install renewable energy and encourage the installation of more rooftop and other solar energy projects. Utility companies will be allowed to propose changes to net metering rates after the completion of a cost and benefits analysis. Existing solar customers would be grandfathered under the original rates until January 2027.

=== Ohio ===
Recently, it has become a popular trend for utilities in several states to dramatically increase their consumers' fixed charges in order to account for the cost-shift created by the growing number of net metering customers who do not cover their share of grid upkeep costs, which, subsequently, places the burden onto non-solar panel customers. The average increase of fixed charges is estimated at 20 percent.

In Ohio, American Electric Power (AEP) proposed to more than double its fixed charges from $8.40 per month to $18.40 per month, affecting nearly 1.5 million customers in order to accommodate for the increase costs due to net metering.

AEP was under investigation by the Public Utilities Commission of Ohio (PUCO) for allegedly double-charging their customers a total of $120 million to supposedly cover fuel costs for one of their power plants in Lawerenceburg, Indiana and for two other power plants operated by Ohio Valley Electric Corp. The double-charge would have affected 67 percent or 1 million customers who had opted out of an alternate supplier. In 2014, PUCO enlisted an outside firm to conduct an audit focusing on their consumers' charges. The findings concluded that the customers were indeed overpaying. At the same time, AEP was being reimbursed for their fuel costs twice in a period from 2013 to 2015.

The Office of the Ohio Consumer's Council, under the auditor's advice, requested AEP to disclose additional records, which was, in turn, denied by a PUCO administrative law judge, who agreed with AEP's stance that their confidentiality be protected until the audit process was resolved. Pablo Vegas, the president and chief operating officer of AEP Ohio, insisted at the time that rates are based on actual costs of system operations, solidifying the company's claim that no deceptive action had taken place.

A ruling by PUCO in November 2017 reduced the amount of credit a customer could receive for excess electricity sold back into the grid. This reduction in credit applies to people whose systems generate enough electricity to offset all of their use, and still have some electricity left over. On January 10, 2018, PUCO held public oral arguments on the issue. Utilities and opponents are "digging in against each other over proposed changes", and the issue looks likely to head to the state Supreme Court. One of the more contentious sections limits the part of a customer's bill that can be offset by solar panel generation.

In a statewide poll of Republican or independents who also say they are conservative, the Ohio Conservative Energy Forum found in 2018 that 87 percent support net metering.

=== South Carolina ===
In South Carolina, residential solar can make up two percent of the energy each utility sells, according to a law passed in 2014. Solar developers and solar advocate special interests argue that the cap stifles further residential solar development in the state. In June 2018, South Carolina lawmakers declined to remove limits on solar in the state during reconciliation of the state's annual budget bill. Developers and renewable advocates criticized state legislators for cutting the proposal from the budget bill. Major utilities in South Carolina are expected to meet the net metering cap this year.

=== Utah ===
The state of Utah offers tax credit for customers of residential solar panels. In February 2017, there was a compromise in the state legislature to phase out the solar tax credit by the year 2021 by limiting how much of a tax credit each person can get. The bill, House Bill 23, was signed in March 2017 by Utah's governor Gary Herbert. In Utah, before the legislation takes effect, rooftop solar customers can claim $2,000 in tax credits. That amount will be reduced by $400 each year starting in 2018 until it is down to zero. Regarding the passage and signing of House Bill 23, the solar industry didn't fight it.

Tax credits currently cost the state of Utah $6 million per year. This is due to the growth in residential installations. Rooftop solar customers can currently get $2,000 in tax credits on their state income tax return. If the bill is passed into law, that amount will be reduced by $400 per year starting in 2018. The solar power industry doesn't like the bill; however, they did not contest it.

The largest threat to solar power in Utah is rate design and changes to net metering. However, in the last week of August 2017, Utah Governor Gary Herbert's office announced that stakeholders reached a compromise in Utah's net metering debate. The compromise allows Rocky Mountain Power's current solar customers, as well as those who submit their solar application through November 15, 2017, to continue receiving the "retail rate" credits (when their solar power systems generate excess electricity and send it back to the grid) until 2035. The compromise also implements a 3-year transition that gives export credits to rooftop solar customers. During that time, Rocky Mountain Power must study a "new method of compensation after a value of solar study concludes." Over a dozen entities signed onto the agreement, including Rocky Mountain Power, Vivint Solar, Utah Clean Energy, the Utah Solar Energy Association, and the Utah Division of Public Utilities.

The plan would "decrease the value of credits customers receive from the utility in exchange for excess power their panels generate." Rocky Mountain Power decided to grandfather existing net metering customers until the year 2035.

Utah had a once robust rooftop solar market. However, as of 2018, the market has significantly declined after the state implemented changes to net metering.

In the second quarter of 2018, Rocky Mountain Power saw only 1,087 customers who installed distributed renewable energy systems, of which almost all of them were rooftop solar. This number represents a decline of more than half from the first quarter of 2018. It is also far less than the number of installations conducted in 2016 or 2017. In those years, over 10,000 net metering installations were performed.

=== Vermont ===
In October 2017 solar panel installer SolarCity reached a settlement with the Vermont Department of Public Service over improperly filed contracts. The Vermont Public Utility Commission (VPUC) investigated SolarCity's business practices in September 2017. VPUC said SolarCity failed to file registrations with state regulators. The company will spend $200,000 "to address net-metering contracts and registrations for about 134 customers" under the settlement.

Vermont changed its net metering program. The new rules "encourage community solar projects and help ratepayers, who subsidize the above market rates utilities are required to pay for power generated under the program."

=== Virginia ===
Virginia Governor Ralph Northam, in October 2018, announced the creation of the 2018 Virginia Energy Plan. The plan makes energy conservation recommendations in the areas of solar energy, wind energy, energy efficiency, energy storage, and electric vehicles. One of the goals laid out in the plan would expand net metering and community solar programs.
