= National Association of Regulatory Utility Commissioners =

National association representing the U.S. state public service commissioners

- Formation: 1889
- Type: Non-profit organization (trade association)
- Headquarters: 1101 Vermont Avenue, NW, Suite 200, Washington, D.C. 20005
- President: Tricia Pridemore
- First Vice President: Ann Rendahl
- Second Vice President: Jehmal Hudson
- Treasurer: Joshua Byrnes
- Staff: 42
- Website: naruc.org

The National Association of Regulatory Utility Commissioners (NARUC) is the national association representing the U.S. state public service commissioners who regulate essential utility services, including energy, telecommunications, and water. Founded in 1889, the Association is a resource for its members and the regulatory community, providing a venue to set and influence public policy, share best practices, and foster solutions to improve regulation.

Each summer, NARUC holds committee meetings. Major issues in 2016 for regulatory commissioners were rate design and the EPA's Clean Power Plan. Rate design deals with the issue of how to charge (and pay) customers who generate their own electricity through means such as rooftop solar devices. Consumers whose homes or businesses have solar panels that generate power can typically sell back excess electricity to the power grid in a process called net metering. For 2017, from its annual conference (held in July in San Diego), interoperability was a key issue. According to experts from the conference, it is important that the electric grid and smart technologies can work together. The concept is referred to as interoperability. This refers to the ability of different systems being able to share information with each other, interpret the data that they share, and present it to consumers in a way that is accessible.

The president of NARUC is Brandon Presley, who was appointed in November 2019 to the position. He serves as Chairman of Mississippi Public Service Commission.

== Committees and task forces ==
=== Standing committees ===
NARUC has eight standing committees that propose policies for NARUC to support on federal and state issues.

==== Consumer Affairs ====
The Consumer Affairs Committee examines how state commissions protect consumer interests as it relates to many industries, including the telecommunications and energy industries. Major issues include "slamming", information protection, and consumer education.

==== Critical Infrastructure ====
This committee was created after the 2001 terrorist attacks to look at security concerns surrounding utility infrastructure. The committee helps state regulators share best practices and collaborate about the best security practices. The committee chairman is Richard S. Mroz of the New Jersey Board of Public Utilities. It has one subcommittee, the Staff Subcommittee on Critical Infrastructure which is chaired by Lynn P. Costantini of the New Jersey Board of Public Utilities.

==== Electricity ====
According to NARUC, the "Electricity Committee develops and advances policies that promote reliable, adequate, and affordable supply of electricity." The committee works closely with the Federal Energy Regulatory Commission (FERC) and other federal agencies.

The committee chairman is Edward S. Finley, Jr. of the North Carolina Utilities Commission. It has six subcommittees:

- Staff Subcommittee on Electricity
- Staff Subcommittee on Electric Reliability
- Staff Subcommittee on Clean Coal and Carbon Management
- Staff Subcommittee on Nuclear Issues-Waste Disposal
- Subcommittee on Nuclear Issues-Waste Disposal
- Subcommittee on Clean Coal and Carbon Management

According to experts from a NARUC conference in July 2017, it is important that the electric grid and smart technologies can work together. The concept is referred to as interoperability. This refers to the ability of different systems being able to share information with each other, interpret the data that they share, and present it to consumers in a way that is accessible.

==== Energy Resources and the Environment ====
The committee works with state regulators to find ways to create environmentally sustainable and affordable energy for utilities. Major issues the committee focuses on include:

- Energy efficiency
- Protection of the environment
- Renewable energy and distributed resources (net metering)
- Assistance to low-income utility customers

==== Gas ====
The Committee on Gas hosts panel discussions and educational sessions to help NARUC's constituency understand issues affecting natural gas. The committee works with FERC, the U.S. Department of Energy and the U.S. Department of Transportation. These collaborations include research and publication of white papers and other materials aimed at solving current and future gas-related challenges.

The chairman is Stan Wise of the Georgia Public Service Commission. It has three subcommittees: the Staff Subcommittee on Gas; Staff Subcommittee on Pipeline Safety; and Subcommittee on Pipeline Safety, which is chaired by Norman Saari, a commissioner on the Michigan Public Service Commission.

==== International Relations ====
According to NARUC, "With the trend of energy market development expands overseas, several countries have sought help and best practices from their American counterparts. The International Committee manages NARUC's outreach activities across the globe, including partnerships with numerous countries in Eastern Europe, Africa, and Bangladesh."

==== Telecommunications ====
Since the telecommunications industry was deregulated in 1996, both the industry and the regulators' roles have quickly changed. The committee serves state regulators by sharing best practices and trends related to telecommunications issues. It works with many federal agencies, such as the Federal Communications Commission, Federal Trade Commission, and FBI.

==== Water ====
The committee works with the EPA, water companies, and state water administrators to discuss issues about the use and reuse of water.

=== Task forces ===
==== Innovation ====
The Task Force on Innovation focuses on new technologies and innovation in the utility sector. Topics will include:

- Integrated energy networks
- Battery storage
- Renewables
- Smart networks
- Information technologies
- Data analytics
- Internet of Things
- New technology regulations

==== Veterans' Workforce ====
The Task Force on Veterans' Workforce will focus on veterans programs and job opportunities in the utilities sector.

== Board of directors ==
The following board members were officers or committee or task force chairs in 2017

Name	Position	State Commission
Brandon Presley	President	Mississippi
	First Vice President	
Edward Finley, Jr.	Second Vice President	North Carolina Utilities Commission
David E. Ziegner	Treasurer	Indiana
Greg R. White	Executive Director	(none - works at NARUC)
David W. Danner	Chairman, Committee on International Relations	Washington
Judith W. Jagdmann	Chairman, Committee on Electricity	Virginia
Mary-Anna Holden	Chairwoman, Committee on Water	New Jersey
John E. Howard	Chairman, Subcommittee on Education and Research	South Carolina
Paul Kjellander	Chairman, Committee on Telecommunications	Idaho
Nancy Lange	Chairwoman, Committee on Energy Resources and the Environment	Minnesota
Rachael A. Eubanks	Chairwoman, Subcommittee on Supplier and Workforce Diversity	Michigan
Norman J. Saari	Chair, Subcommittee on Pipeline Safety	Michigan
Richard S. Mroz	Chairman, Committee on Critical Infrastructure	New Jersey
Maida J. Coleman	Chairwoman, Committee on Consumers and the Public Interest	Missouri
Diane X Burman	Chairwoman, Committee on Gas	New York
Brien J. Sheahan	Chairman, Task Force on Innovation	Illinois
Judith W. Jagdmann	Chairwoman, Task Force on Veterans' Workforce	Virginia

The remaining board members are:

Name	State Commission	Other position
Bob Anthony	Oklahoma	
Betty Ann Kane	District of Columbia	
	W. Kevin Hughes	Maryland
G. O'Neal Hamilton	South Carolina	
Audrey Zibelman	New York	
Lorraine H. Akiba	Hawaii	
Carla Peterman	California	
Asim Z. Haque	Ohio	
Robert R. Scott	New Hampshire	
Mark Vannoy	Maine	
Nick Wagner	Iowa	President, 2018
Margaret E. Curran	Rhode Island	
Kara Brighton	Wyoming	
Chris Nelson	South Dakota	
Brandon Presley	Mississippi	
John R. Rosales	Illinois	

NARUC appointed two new board members at its winter meeting in 2017. Doug Little of the Arizona Corporation Commission was appointed to a term that begins immediately in February 2017 and ends in October 2020. As an Arizona Corporation Commissioner, Little was first elected in November 2014 and served as the chairman in 2016. He was the vice chairman of the Western Energy Imbalance Market Body of State Regulators and is a member of the Western Interconnection Regional Advisory Board.

Chris Nelson is a commissioner on the South Dakota Public Utilities Commission. He was appointed to serve on the board of NARUC on January 12, 2017 through October 2018. He previously served on the board in 2014 and was the chairman of the Committee on Telecommunications. He previously served as the South Dakota Secretary of State for eight years.

== Issues ==
In November 2016, the NARUC Board of Directors formally adopted the “Distributed Energy Resources Rate Design and Compensation” manual during NARUC’s annual meeting in La Quinta, California. The manual was created as a guide for utility regulators in the process of implementing appropriate DER rate design and compensation policies.

On February 13, 2017, two experts discussed the elements that determine solar value and the benefits and challenges of utility scale versus rooftop solar at the NARUC winter committee meeting. Solar prices, subsidies, net metering rules, and technology all determine the value of solar energy. Rooftop solar, also known as distributed solar, has upsides and downsides. Upsides include peak shaving, resiliency, voltage and frequency support, the distribution of power where it is developed, load reduction, and the flow of energy back into the system. However, rooftop solar costs 2 to 3 times as much as utility scale solar and it gets subsidized. Utility scale solar contains nearly all of the "pro" arguments for rooftop solar, but without the subsidies.

At the 2018 NARUC Winter Policy Summit in Washington D.C. a panel of experts testified on the subject of the electricity storage business sector, and creating successful business models to optimize electric storage technology within the regulated environment. The price of electricity storage has dropped dramatically in recent years and, as a result, it is becoming a more-viable source of energy and grid supply. Panelists agreed that the storage market is growing considerably. Experts predicted 35 megawatts of installed storage capacity by 2025, of which 75 percent would be by utilities.

In October 2018, NARUC published a report that says that the Federal Energy Regulatory Commission (FERC) should modernize the Public Utility Regulatory Policies Act (PURPA) of 1978 for the energy sector, and why. In 1978, during a national energy crisis, Congress passed PURPA to encourage alternative energy sources at a time when gas was scarce. PURPA required that electric utilities purchase renewable energy from certain sources. Under the law, utilities were required to charge rates to customers that were reasonable.

== State regulatory commissions ==
State	Commission Name	Website
Alabama	Alabama Public Service Commission	http://www.psc.Alabama.gov
Alaska	Regulatory Commission of Alaska	http://rca.alaska.gov
Arizona	Arizona Corporation Commission	http://www.azcc.gov
Arkansas	Arkansas Public Service Commission	
California	California Public Utilities Commission	http://www.cpuc.ca.gov
Colorado	Colorado Public Utilities Commission	
Connecticut	Connecticut Public Utilities Regulatory Authority	https://www.ct.gov/pura/
Delaware	Delaware Public Service Commission	http://depsc.delaware.gov
District of Columbia	Public Service Commission of the District of Columbia	http://www.dcpsc.org
Florida	Florida Public Service Commission	http://www.psc.state.fl.us
Georgia	Georgia Public Service Commission	http://www.psc.state.ga.us
Hawaii	Hawaii Public Utilities Commission	http://puc.hawaii.gov
Idaho	Idaho Public Utilities Commission	http://www.puc.idaho.gov
Illinois	Illinois Commerce Commission	http://www.icc.illinois.gov
Indiana	Indiana Utility Regulatory Commission	http://www.in.gov/iurc
Iowa	Iowa Utilities Board	http://iub.iowa.gov
Kansas	Kansas Corporation Commission	http://www.kcc.ks.gov
Kentucky	Kentucky Public Service Commission	http://psc.ky.gov
Louisiana	Louisiana Public Service Commission	http://www.lpsc.org
Maine	Maine Public Utilities Commission	http://www.maine.gov/mpuc
Maryland	Maryland Public Service Commission	http://www.psc.state.md.us
Massachusetts	Massachusetts Department of Public Utilities	http://www.mass.gov/dpu
Michigan	Michigan Public Service Commission	http://www.michigan.gov/mpsc
Minnesota	Minnesota Public Utilities Commission	http://www.mn.gov/puc
Mississippi	Mississippi Public Service Commission	http://www.psc.state.ms.us
Missouri	Missouri Public Service Commission	http://www.psc.mo.gov
Montana	Montana Public Service Commission	http://www.psc.mt.gov
Nebraska	Nebraska Public Service Commission	http://psc.nebraska.gov
Nevada	Public Utilities Commission of Nevada	http://puc.nv.gov
New Hampshire	New Hampshire Public Utilities Commission	http://www.puc.nh.gov
New Jersey	New Jersey Board of Public Utilities	http://www.bpu.state.nj.us
New Mexico	New Mexico Public Regulation Commission	http://www.nmprc.state.nm.us
New York	New York State Public Service Commission	http://www.dps.ny.gov
North Carolina	North Carolina Utilities Commission	http://www.ncuc.net
North Dakota	North Dakota Public Service Commission	http://www.psc.nd.gov
Ohio	Public Utilities Commission of Ohio	http://www.puco.ohio.gov/
Oklahoma	Oklahoma Corporation Commission	http://www.occeweb.com
Oregon	Oregon Public Utility Commission	http://www.puc.state.or.us
Pennsylvania	Pennsylvania Public Utility Commission	http://www.puc.pa.gov
Rhode Island	Rhode Island Public Utilities Commission	https://web.archive.org/web/20190820172918/http://www.ripuc.org/
South Carolina	South Carolina Public Service Commission	http://www.psc.sc.gov
South Dakota	South Dakota Public Utilities Commission	http://www.puc.sd.gov
Tennessee	Tennessee Regulatory Authority	http://www.tn.gov/tra
Texas	Public Utility Commission of Texas	http://www.puc.texas.gov
Utah	Public Service Commission of Utah	http://www.psc.utah.gov
Vermont	Vermont Public Service Board	http://psb.vermont.gov
Virginia	Virginia State Corporation Commission	http://www.scc.virginia.gov
Washington	Washington Utilities and Transportation Commission	http://www.utc.wa.gov
West Virginia	Public Service Commission of West Virginia	http://www.psc.state.wv.us
Wisconsin	Public Service Commission of Wisconsin	http://psc.wi.gov
Wyoming	Wyoming Public Service Commission	http://psc.state.wy.us
