= Public utilities commission =

Regulatory body for public utilities in the United States and Canada

A public utilities commission is a quasi-governmental body that provides oversight and/or regulation of public utilities in a particular area (locality, municipality, or subnational division), especially in the United States and Canada.

The utilities in question may be owned by the consumers that it serves, a mutual utility like a public utility district, a state-owned utility, or it may be a stockholder-owned utility either publicly traded on a stock exchange or closely held among just a few investors. These utilities often operate as legal monopolies, which means that they do not compete in a marketplace but are instead regulated by commissions to ensure fair pricing.

== Canada ==
In Canada, a public utilities commission (PUC) is a public utility regulator, typically a semi-independent quasi-judicial tribunal, owned and operated within a municipal or local government system under the oversight of one or more elected commissioners. Its role is analogous to a municipal utility district or public utility district in the US.

Below are the PUCs in Canada:

- Board of Commissioners of Public Utilities (Newfoundland and Labrador)
- British Columbia Utilities Commission
- Manitoba Public Utilities Board
- New Brunswick Energy and Utilities Board
- Nova Scotia Utility and Review Board
- Ontario Energy Board
- PEI Regulatory and Appeals Commission

Former commissions in Ontario include:

- Berlin Public Utilities Commission (1906–1916) in Berlin, Ontario
- Brantford Public Utilities Commission (–2001) in Brantford, Ontario
- Galt Public Utilities Commission (1962–1973) in Galt, Ontario
- Kitchener Public Utilities Commission (1916–1973)

== United States ==
Appointed by governor Appointed by legislature Election by single-winner district Election at-large for all members Election at-large from residency districts; suspended as of 19 August 2022

In the United States, a public utilities commission (PUC), which may also be named a public service commission (PSC), corporation commission, or similar, is a governing body that regulates the rates and services of a public utility, such as an electric utility. In some cases, government bodies with the title "public service commission" may be civil service oversight bodies, rather than utilities regulators.

The National Association of Regulatory Utility Commissioners is the national association representing the interests of the public utilities commissions in all 50 states. The Interstate Commerce Commission and Federal Communications Commission perform similar functions in their respective fields in the United States.

The first state utility regulator was the Public Service Commission of Wisconsin, founded in 1907 under Governor Robert M. La Follette to set minimum standards and regulate rates of monopoly utilities.

=== PUCs in the US by state ===
Jurisdiction	Organization	Members	Selection of commissioners
Alabama	Alabama Public Service Commission	3	Elected at-large
Arizona	Arizona Corporation Commission	5	Elected at-large
Alaska	Regulatory Commission of Alaska		Appointed by the governor
Arkansas	Arkansas Public Service Commission	3	Appointed by the governor
California	California Public Utilities Commission	5	Appointed by the governor
Colorado	Colorado Public Utilities Commission	3	Appointed by the governor
Connecticut	Connecticut Public Utilities Regulatory Authority		Appointed by the governor
Delaware	Delaware Public Service Commission	5	Appointed by the governor
DC	District of Columbia Public Service Commission	3	Appointed by the mayor
Florida	Florida Public Service Commission	5	Appointed by the governor
Georgia (U.S. state)	Georgia Public Service Commission	5	Elected at-large from residency districts
Hawaii	Hawaii Public Utilities Commission	3	Appointed by the governor
Idaho	Idaho Public Utilities Commission	3	Appointed by the governor
Illinois	Illinois Commerce Commission	5	Appointed by the governor
Indiana	Indiana Utility Regulatory Commission	5	Appointed by the governor
Iowa	Iowa Utilities Board	3	Appointed by the governor
Kansas	Kansas Corporation Commission	3	Appointed by the governor
Kentucky	Kentucky Public Service Commission	3	Appointed by the governor
Louisiana	Louisiana Public Service Commission	5	Elected by district
Maine	Maine Public Utilities Commission	3	Appointed by the governor
Maryland	Maryland Public Service Commission	5	Appointed by the governor
Massachusetts	Massachusetts Department of Public Utilities	3	Appointed by the governor
Massachusetts	Massachusetts Department of Telecommunications and Cable and Massachusetts Department of Public Utilities		Appointed by the governor
Michigan	Michigan Public Service Commission	3	Appointed by the governor
Minnesota	Minnesota Public Utilities Commission	5	Appointed by the governor
Mississippi	Mississippi Public Service Commission	3	Elected by district
Missouri	Missouri Public Service Commission	5	Appointed by the governor
Montana	Montana Public Service Commission	5	Elected by district
Nebraska	Nebraska Public Service Commission	5	Elected by district
Nevada	Nevada Public Utilities Commission	3	Appointed by the governor
New Hampshire	New Hampshire Public Utilities Commission	3	Appointed by the governor
New Jersey	New Jersey Board of Public Utilities	5	Appointed by the governor
New Mexico	New Mexico Public Regulation Commission	3	Appointed by the governor
New York	New York Public Service Commission	7	Appointed by the governor
North Carolina	North Carolina Utilities Commission	7	Appointed by the governor
North Dakota	North Dakota Public Service Commission	3	Elected at-large
Ohio	Public Utilities Commission of Ohio	5	Appointed by the governor
Oklahoma	Oklahoma Corporation Commission	3	Elected at-large
Oregon	Oregon Public Utility Commission	3	Appointed by the governor
Pennsylvania	Pennsylvania Public Utility Commission		Appointed by the governor
Rhode Island	Rhode Island Public Utilities Commission		Appointed by the governor
South Carolina	South Carolina Public Service Commission	7	Appointed by the governor, confirmed by the senate
South Dakota	South Dakota Public Utilities Commission	3	Elected at-large
Tennessee	Tennessee Public Service Commission (1897–1996) Tennessee Regulatory Authority (since 1996)	3	Appointed by the governor
Texas	Railroad Commission of Texas	3	Elected at-large
Texas	Texas Public Utility Commission	5	Appointed by the governor
Utah	Utah Public Service Commission	3	Appointed by the governor
Vermont	Vermont Public Utility Commission		Appointed by the governor
Vermont	Vermont Public Utility Commission	3	Appointed by the governor
Virginia	Virginia State Corporation Commission	3	Legislative appointment
Virgin Islands	Virgin Islands Public Services Commission	5	Appointed by the governor, with two additional ex-officio members appointed by the senate president
Washington	Washington Utilities and Transportation Commission	3	Appointed by the governor
West Virginia	West Virginia Public Service Commission	3	Appointed by the governor
Wisconsin	Public Service Commission of Wisconsin	3	Appointed by the governor
Wyoming	Wyoming Public Service Commission	3	Appointed by the governor

=== Local PUCs ===
Jurisdiction	Organization	Members	Selection of commissioners
San Francisco	San Francisco Public Utilities Commission	3	Nominated by the Mayor and confirmed by the SF Board of Supervisors

== Other countries ==
Americas

- Bahamas: Bahamas Public Utilities Commission
- Belize: Belize Public Utilities Commission
- Caribbean: Organisation of Caribbean Utility Regulators (OOCUR)
- Chile: Superintendencia de Servicios Sanitarios de Chile
- Costa Rica: Costa Rica Public Utilities Commission
- Dominican Republic: c Utilities Commission

Others

- France: Commission de régulation de l'énergie
- Ghana: Public Utility Regulation Council of Ghana (PURC)
- Sri Lanka: Public Utilities Commission of Sri Lanka
