= Dianne Martin =

Dianne Martin may refer to:

- C. Dianne Martin (fl. 1950s–2020s), American computer scientist
- Dianne Martin (Canadian lawyer) (1945–2004), Canadian lawyer
- Dianne Martin (New Hampshire lawyer) (fl. 1990s–2020s), New Hampshire lawyer and government official

== See also ==
- Diana Martín (born 1981), Spanish athlete
- Diana Martin (scientist) (1942–2019), New Zealand microbiologist
