= Net metering in Nevada =

Net metering in Nevada is a public policy and political issue surrounding the rates that Nevada public utilities are required to pay to purchase excess energy produced by electric customers who generate their own electricity, such as through rooftop solar panels. The issue centers around the question paying solar customers the retail or wholesale rate for the generated electricity.

Before 2016, Nevada utilities paid those with solar panels the retail rate for electricity. At the end of 2015, the Nevada Public Utilities Commission approved new rules that changed that rate to the wholesale rate.

== Background ==
Under a setup known as net metering, utilities must buy excess electricity generated by people with solar panels. For example, on a sunny day, a home with solar panels generates power. If the homeowners are away and the home is using less electricity than the solar panels are generating, that excess electricity flows to the electric grid. The utility company purchases that electricity.

=== Retail vs. wholesale rate ===
Utility companies buy power at a “wholesale” rate and sell to consumers at a “retail rate.” The retail rate is higher than the wholesale rate. The retail electric rate charged by utilities are the final rates that customers get charged for using electricity. The utilities calculate these rates by taking into consideration the cost of purchasing the power (the wholesale rate) and the fixed costs the utility incurs. Fixed costs are items such as installing electric poles and wires, putting meters on people's homes and businesses, and implementing technology to maintain the electric grid. The wholesale rate is what the utility pays electricity providers to buy their electricity. A competitive marketplace exists from which utilities can purchase electricity. Throughout a single day, the price of electricity on the wholesale market can change.

== History ==
Net metering subsidy has been in place in Nevada since 1997. Tim Webb, a manager at Robco Electric (one of the main sellers of rooftop solar panels in Nevada), said, "It was kind of like the solar gold rush here. All these companies flocked into town, set up an office and sold systems."

As of December 2015, net metering customers in Southern Nevada were compensated an average of $623 per year for their excess electricity, while Northern Nevada net metering customers received an average of $471 per year.

In 2015, the Nevada legislature passed a law that required the commission to examine the electric rate structure and to look at cost shifting. KRNV Channel 4 (NBC) of Reno, Nevada, defined cost shifting as “when non-solar residential customers are said to be subsidizing those with solar for using NV Energy’s grid.” (NV Energy is the major utility company in the state of Nevada, and it is owned by Berkshire Hathaway Energy, a subsidiary of Warren Buffett’s Berkshire Hathaway.) Specifically, the law requiring Nevada Public Utilities Commission's review was Senate Bill 374, passed during the legislature's 2015 session. The bill set a deadline of December 31, 2015 for the commission to decide on new electric rates.

On December 22, 2015, regulators in Nevada created major controversy following their decision to reduce rooftop solar incentives in addition to creating new fees for solar owners. As a result, a lawsuit was filed against the Nevada Public Utilities Commission based on the fact that lowering rates constituted a violation of contracts made with installers.

Commissioner David Noble, who had presided over the commission's net metering docket, recently had decided to break his usual silence and speak out on the regulatory body's decision at the National Association of Regulatory Utility Commissioners (NARUC) meeting held in Nashville, Tennessee over the summer. He proceeded to explain the events leading up to the decision, making it out to be a cautionary about the unethical actions and reckless comments that may ensue in such dealings.

Noble began with the May 2015 signing of Senate Bill 374, which gave the Nevada Public Utilities Commission the responsibility to find a fair and suitable replacement for retail rates given to net metering solar owners, which had caused significant cost shifts negatively impacting non-solar consumers.

The new order calls for higher monthly rates for solar-owning customers from $12.75 to $17.90. In addition to increase in charges, the volumetric rate was lowered from $0.111/kWh to $0.108/kWh. Also, it was determined that over a 12-year period, the rate will reach $38.51 while the volumetric rate will drop to $0.999/kWh. The new rates and conditions apply to both new and existing customers.

Noble insisted that all the terms of this new reform were created to be more than fair and free of any bias or favoritism. He also pointed out the solar industry's lack of evidence supporting their claim to out-benefiting utility grids.

There was also much backlash regarding the omission of a grandfather clause for existing customers. Noble eventually compromised extending the initiation of rate changes for existing solar customers, yet denying them lower rates altogether. This was not taken well by Governor Brian Sandoval, who felt the Commission neglected to protect the interests of those customers. Shortly following this decision, it was announced that the governor will not be reappointing Noble to his post.

Noble was also faced with further backlash in a much more aggressive nature when protestors attempted to barge into a Public Utilities Commission meeting carrying firearms. Although Nevada is an open carry state, the meeting had to be canceled with the commissioners being escorted out.

In regard to accusations from media sources that his decision was made in retaliation to the intimiditative tactics of rooftop solar groups, Noble maintained he was not swayed by anything other than facts and evidence. He also disapproved of the media's blows to his character.

As far as the future of rooftop solar companies in Nevada, Noble acknowledged the collective effort to ease tensions among all the groups with more focus on respect and collaboration. Although the solar companies and groups are making an effort to be cooperative, they still do support a referendum to overturn the commission's decision and go back to retail rates.

=== Public Utilities Commission's Northern Nevada decision ===
In January 2017, NV Energy asked the Public Utilities Commission to reverse a decision regarding net metering rates for future solar customers. The decision restored "more favorable net metering rates" for some rooftop solar customers in northern Nevada. NV Energy argued that the energy savings should have been directed to its Sierra Pacific customers, not redirected to rooftop solar residents in northern Nevada. In October 2016, NV Energy decreased rates for customers by approximately $2.92 million annually, which would amount to $8.77 million over a three-year period. Its intention was to make these cost savings shared among all Northern Nevada electric customers.

In 2016, the rooftop solar industry faced various obstacles when the Nevada Public Utilities Commission established less favorable rates for rooftop solar customers in Nevada. Solar energy supporters supported this decision. Nevada Public Utilities Commission had 40 days to act on the NV Energy request.

=== AB 270 legislation ===
On March 8, 2017, Las Vegas-based Democratic state Assemblyman Justin Watkins introduced a bill, AB 270 to restore net metering to all utility customers. The bill sets a floor rate customers would be paid when they sell their excess energy back to utilities.

To put the bill in context, according to Utility Dive: "Following public outcry over the PUCN's 2015 net metering decision, NV Energy collaborated with solar interests, including SolarCity, to come up with a grandfathering proposal. Then, regulators voted to restore retail rate net metering to customers in Sierra Pacific Power's service territory."

Tesla plans to introduce an amendment to the bill "addressing variable rates for energy storage." Meanwhile, NV Energy plans to add an amendment "detailing a competitive bidding process addressing private generation in some locations."

=== 2017 legislation ===
NV Energy, which is the largest public utility in Nevada, announced in April 2017 that it would exceed Nevada's renewable energy mandate. The current law requires utilities to get 25 percent of their power from renewable sources by 2025. As of 2017, the state got around 23 percent of its electricity from renewables such as wind, solar and geothermal. However, some legislators were introducing bills to require utilities to generate more of their power from renewables.

One bill, AB206 sponsored by Assemblyman Chris Brooks (D-Las Vegas), aimed to change the state's goal of 25 percent by 2025 to 80 percent by 2040. Another bill, AB270, proposed to reverse the Public Utilities Commission's decision in 2015 that eliminated retail rates for net metering. According to KUNR (a Reno NPR affiliate station), the commission's decision “gutted” the rooftop solar industry. The sponsor of AB270, Assemblyman Justin Watkins (D-Las Vegas), said, “We have enough sun in this state that provides for enough energy to be put back into the grid that gives enough credits to residents to make it financially beneficial as long as the rates are right.”

Overall, 15 bills have been introduced regarding renewable energy. The Nevada Resort Association told state lawmakers during a committee hearing that increasing the renewable standards too quickly could hurt the resort industry, which is the state's largest industry. NV Energy has worked to offset concerns and suggested alternative measures. “Through amendments to both the energy portfolio and net-metering bills, the utility would not face increased mandates, but could voluntarily increase green energy production. They would also offer consumers a 20-year net-metering bill credit that has yet to be defined.”

In the last days of the 2017 legislative session, the Nevada legislature took a number of actions to "reopen the state to the development of and investment in distributed generation and community solar projects," according to the National Law Review. The most recent development of solar power in Nevada has been utility-scale projects (vs. home-based solar panels). This is due to the decision in 2015 by the Public Utility Commission of Nevada that changed net metering rates "paid by utilities for electricity produced by distributed generation systems to wholesale, rather than retail, rates."

One bill that was passed, AB405, has set the reimbursement rate for net metering into 4 tiers, which were limited by their total applied capacity of 80 MW. Once the total consumer load of any tier reaches the 80 MW limit, that tier is closed. Each subsequent tier pays a lower rate than the last.

The legislature also passed SB392, "which governs and promotes the development of community solar gardens in the state. As in other states, there are a variety of requirements and limits on the capacity, ownership and subscription of community solar gardens. For example, the legislation limits community solar gardens to a nameplate capacity of twelve megawatts or less and requires that they have at least twenty subscribers." One of the requirements of the legislation is that at least ten percent of the power-producing capacity of each solar garden must be made available to people with low incomes. In June 2017, the bill was vetoed by the governor.

== Nevada Public Utilities Commission net metering decision ==
At the end of 2015, the Nevada Public Utilities Commission changed the rates that utility companies pay to rooftop solar customers for the excess electricity that those customers sell to the utilities. The commission argued that paying rooftop solar customers the full retail rate for their excess electricity puts unreasonable cost increases on utility customers who do not have solar power.

According to the commission, the new rules:

- Change the rate structure to "cost-based"
- Separate net metering customers into a separate rate class to "ensure no cost shift to other ratepayers"
- Pay the wholesale market rate for electricity to net metering customers that provide excess energy from their solar panels
- Will implement the new rates incrementally over four years
- Provide no additional profits to NV Energy

Paul Thomsen, the chairman of the Nevada Public Utilities Commission, said, "If I reduce the burden for one individual or group of people, I have to increase it for someone else. It is that simple."

=== Grandfathering ruling ===
A deal between NV Energy and SolarCity was finally approved on September 16, 2016, allowing rooftop solar customers to retain the use of their original retail rates, which were eradicated following the Nevada Public Utilities Commission's actions which "reduced net metering incentives for both existing and future solar customers- and made the unprecedented decision not to 'grandfather' existing solar customers into the new rate structure."

The decision prompted Nevada solar groups and the Nevada Attorney General's Bureau of Consumer Protection to intervene and challenge the commission's decision based on the fact "it violated the contract clause of the Constitution because many rooftop solar contracts were predicated on retail rate net metering." Under the terms of the new agreement, 32,000 rooftop solar customers will be grandfathered in under the original retail net metering rates over a period of 20 years. These customers applied or installed a rooftop solar system before December 31, 2015. "The agreement also makes eligible customers who withdrew an application, or had a RenewableGenerations application expire between December 23 and December 31, 2015, for the more favorable rates."

NV Energy denies ever requesting the exclusion of a "grandfather" clause in its original proposal, and there were attempts to include such provisions. "NV Energy's intent with its grandfathering proposal was to offer a solution for customers who installed or had valid applications to install rooftop solar systems in the most efficient and timely manner." The clause was eventually denied by the regulators, then presided by Commissioner David Noble, who also authored the net metering decision. This controversy led to Nevada Governor Brian Sandoval's decision to not reappoint Noble to his position and take further action as he was "critical of the net metering decision and convened New Energy Task Force to resolve net metering issues." Both NV Energy and the solar industry applaud Gov. Sandoval's intervention in the matter in order to reach a fair and reasonable outcome.

=== 2017 Nevada Public Utilities Commission decision ===
In August 2017, the Nevada Public Utilities Commission held three days of hearings "including multiple hours of cross examinations and increasingly technical questions on the application last week" on the issue of net metering. The commission drafted and voted on an order that would implement regulations and rates for net metering customers, something that has been "long-awaited" by stakeholders (the vote was mandated by a bill passed by the state legislature during the 2017 legislative session). The purpose of that bill was to restore "favorable reimbursement rates for net metering customers," people who use rooftop solar panels. Net metering customers receive a credit from the utility company when they generate more energy than they are using, and that energy gets sent back into the electric grid. The summer of 2017, and the year leading up to it, was a period of "contentious back and forth between NV Energy, solar companies and state officials."

The previous version of net metering in Nevada was shut down by the state legislature and carried out by the Public Utilities Commission in December 2015. Under the new system, new rooftop solar customers will receive a reimbursement equal to a percentage of the retail price of electricity whenever they send their own energy back to the electric grid. That percentage rates are known as "tiers" and will start at 95% of the retail price for the first 80 MW of installed capacity.

In July 2017, NV Energy submitted a 376-page application that proposed to modify the rate structure for all of their customers. The application was criticized by rooftop solar companies including Tesla, Vivint Solar and a pro-solar political group called Vote Solar. The solar companies said that the rate structure would "undercut their business model."

== Opposition ==
According to Paul Thomsen, the chairman of the Nevada Public Utilities Commission, Governor Sandoval was disappointed at the commission's decision.

Greenpeace opposed the commission's action and called the Nevada Governor, Brian Sandoval, corrupt. The group wrote a post in its website with the headline "What a Bought Politician in Nevada Means for the 2016 Presidential Race." The Nevada newspaper Reno News & Review wrote in an article that Greenpeace's article does not support the headline. The article also states, "Greenpeace lets the state legislators—who directed the PUC to act—off the hook entirely."

Harry Reid, the Democratic leader of the U.S. Senate, condemned the commission's decision during a political visit at the Washoe County Democratic headquarters. Reid said, "Warren Buffett said it all. He said, 'People don’t buy utilities to get rich, they buy utilities to stay rich.'"

=== Armed protesters ===
On February 8, 2016, the commission held a hearing around whether to finalize or reconsider the commission's new net metering rates. Outside the commission's office, protesters gathered and a senior vice president of SolarCity spoke in support of the protesters. Three people carrying guns tried to enter the building to attend the hearing, but were turned away by security guards. The three people were wearing T-shirts that said “Bring Back Solar” and had wheelbarrows with petition cards. After they were turned away, they said they would be back at the next commission meeting with their guns.

According to the Las Vegas Review-Journal, an email was being circulated that contained the home addresses of the members of the commission.

In public statements, both Governor Sandoval and SolarCity requested civility and respect.

== See also ==
- Net metering
- Distributed generation
- Energy policy of the United States
- Power purchase agreement
- Renewable energy
- Renewable energy commercialization
- Rooftop photovoltaic power station
