= John Hill Paylor =

American politician

John Hill Paylor (died March 17, 1965) was a North Carolina politician in the early 20th century. Paylor was born in Laurinburg, North Carolina on October 22, 1896. He was the son of James Monroe Paylor and Elizabeth Ann Hill Paylor. He attended high school at Laurinburg High School in Laurinburg, North Carolina. He went to the University of North Carolina from 1915 to 1918. He achieved a LL.B in 1921 at UNC, and graduated in 1920. He went on to becoming a lawyer, and a Democratic representative for Pitt County, North Carolina. He was in the North Carolina House of Representatives in the 1935 and 1937 sessions. He was also General Counsel of the State Utilities Commission and Assistant Attorney General of North Carolina.

He served in World War 1. John had perfect attendance for 50 years at his Sunday school class. John enjoyed stamp collecting, and listening to big band music. John was married to Miss Alice Katherine Flynn on June 11, 1921. They had two children, John Hill Paylor Jr. and Robert Flynn Paylor. Overall, John Hill Paylor played a very important role in the state of North Carolina. He had served in the First World War, and he had become a lawyer.

John had stayed in North Carolina for much of his life. He died on March 17, 1965.
