= Public Service Commission =

Public Service Commission may refer to:

- Public utilities commission
  - Alabama Public Service Commission
  - Georgia Public Service Commission
  - Public Service Commission (Indiana)
  - Public Utilities Commission of Ohio
  - Public Utilities Commission of Sri Lanka
  - Public Utility Commission of Texas
  - Public Service Commission of Utah
- Civil service commission
  - Australian Public Service Commission
  - Bangladesh Public Service Commission
  - Public Service Commission of Canada
  - Public Services Commission of Ghana
  - Public Service Commission (Hong Kong)
  - Public service commissions in India, state and central commissions
    - Union Public Service Commission, central governmental recruiting agency for the civil services of India
  - Public Service Commission (Kenya)
  - Public Services Commission of Malaysia
  - Public Service Commission (Nepal)
  - Public Service Commission (New Zealand)
  - Public Service Commission (Singapore)
  - Public Service Commission (Sri Lanka)
  - Federal Public Service Commission (Pakistan)
