= Dianne Martin (New Hampshire lawyer) =

American attorney and public administrator

Chair of the New Hampshire Public Utilities Commission
- In office September 2019 – November 12, 2021
- Governor: Chris Sununu
- Preceded by: Martin Honigberg
- Succeeded by: Daniel Goldner

Personal details
- Education: Saint Anselm College (B.A.); Boston College Law School (J.D.)
- Occupation: Attorney, public administrator

Dianne Martin is an American attorney and public administrator who chaired the New Hampshire Public Utilities Commission from 2019 to 2021, and subsequently directed the Administrative Office of the Courts of the New Hampshire Judicial Branch.

== Education and early career ==
Martin received a B.A. from Saint Anselm College a in 1996, followed by a J.D. from Boston College Law School in 2002. In the late 1990s, she worked as an AmeriCorps victims' advocate in the Concord prosecutor's office. She also served as general counsel to the New Hampshire Division for Juvenile Justice.

In 2002, Martin began working for the New Hampshire Department of Justice, including five years in its Transportation and Construction Bureau and service as the department's lead attorney for state-agency contracts and procurement. Her litigation included matters involving the transfer of the state's lease on Mount Sunapee Ski Area, and a stormwater-pollution settlement involving Pease International Tradeport and the Conservation Law Foundation. Martin eventually worked under Gordon J. MacDonald at the Department of Justice, where he promoted her to chief of staff in 2019..

== Public Utilities Commission ==
On August 27, 2019, Governor Chris Sununu announced his nomination of Martin to chair the Public Utilities Commission. The Executive Council unanimously confirmed her on September 18, 2019. In this capacity, she also chaired the Site Evaluation Committee, which reviewed large-scale energy-development proposals.

Martin publicly responded to criticism from former commissioner Kate Bailey, who attributed stalled decisions to a less collaborative working culture under Martin, who said in return that final decisions required a commission majority rather than action by the chair alone.

On her last day as chair, November 12, 2021, Martin co-signed an order with her successor, Daniel Goldner, rejecting a proposed three-year energy-efficiency plan involving more than $350 million in spending. The state's consumer advocate had supported the proposed plan, and consumer advocate Don Kreis criticized Martin's rejection of the plan.

== Court employment ==
Martin became director of the New Hampshire Judicial Branch's Administrative Office of the Courts in November 2021. In February 2025, Martin was informed that her position was being eliminated. She initially declined an offer to become general counsel to the Office of Bar Admissions, before subsequently accepting revised terms providing a salary of $154,109, fully remote work, and direct supervision by Chief Justice MacDonald. Rather than transferring directly, she was officially laid off for two days before being rehired on April 4, which enabled her to receive nearly $50,000 in accrued leave benefits and termination pay.

A Judicial Branch human-resources employee objected to the arrangement, which was reported to the public byh NHPR in October 2025. Participating Supreme Court justices defended the personnel decisions as collective actions consistent with standard policies, and after a preliminary review, the New Hampshire Department of Justice announced on November 25, 2025, that it had found no reasonable suspicion of actionable criminal conduct, but concluded that human-resources best practices had not been followed.
