= Delaware Public Service Commission =

State agency of Delaware, United States

The Delaware Public Service Commission is a public utilities commission, a quasi-judicial tribunal, which regulates investor-owned public utilities in the U.S. state of Delaware. It regulates cable, electric, natural gas, wastewater, water and telecommunications services.

== See also ==
- Public Utilities Commission
