= Net metering in New Mexico =

Mexican state public policies

Net metering in New Mexico is a set of state public policies that govern the relationship between solar customers (and customers with other types of renewable energy systems) and electric utility companies.

== Background ==
=== Definition ===
Net metering refers to the interconnection of a renewable energy system to the power grid. It allows consumers who have their own renewable generation power systems to connect to the power grid with an electric meter that spins both forwards and backwards, depending on whether the consumer is adding energy to the grid or using energy from the grid. At the end of the month, the customer's bill is based on the net amount of power that is drawn from the grid, minus the credits for excess power put into the grid.

In New Mexico, customers who have systems that produce up to 80 MW of electricity are able to sign up for net metering. This is the highest power rating eligible for net metering in the United States.

The three main utilities in New Mexico are PNM, Xcel Energy and El Paso Electric.

=== Benefits of net metering ===
One benefit of net metering is that power is never wasted. When someone uses an isolated system that uses batteries that become fully charged while the system is still generating power, that excess power is wasted.

Customer-generators, businesses and industrial operations can qualify for net metering. Customer-generators have the added benefit of selling renewable energy credits (REC) back to their utility. (A customer-generator is a small producer—that is not an electric utility—of electricity which is net metered and connected to the electric grid. An example would be a homeowner who puts solar panels on his rooftop.)

=== Utility-scale solar vs. residential solar ===
A utility-scale solar facility is a large facility that generates solar power and moves that power into the electric grid. Almost every utility-scale solar facility has what is known as a power purchase agreement with the utility. The agreement guarantees a market for the utility-scale solar facility's energy for a fixed term of time. (Residential solar systems are not considered utility-scale).

The size of a utility-scale facility can vary. For example, some utility-scale facilities provide only enough power for a few hundred average homes. Others offer a lot more energy. Factors that play into this are location, the type of technology used, and the availability of sunlight.

For example, although not located in New Mexico, Recurrent Energies’ “Sunset Reservoir” project in San Francisco produces 5 megawatts of solar energy. It is built on top of enclosed reservoir in the middle of San Francisco. It is considered a utility-scale solar facility.

== How it works ==
=== Net excess generation ===
For customers with solar systems that can generate 10 kilowatts or less, the utility company has a choice in how they compensate that customer for net excess generation. The utility can give the customer a credit on their next bill equal to the utility's energy rate (the costs that the utility pays for its own electricity), or crediting the customer for the kilowatt hours of electricity that they have supplied back to utility through the grid.

=== Technical ===
In New Mexico, a few technical requirements exist in order for a net metering system to be connected to the grid. First, the net metering system should have a visible means of disconnection allowing the utility to disconnect to system from the grid. Second, a net meter is required and should cost no more than $20. Third, there needs to be an inverter that disconnects when the grid goes down.

The system capacity limit is 80 megawatts.

=== Eligibility ===
In New Mexico the types of renewable technologies eligible for net metering are the following:

- Combined Heat & Power
- Fuel cells using Non-Renewable Fuels
- Fuel cells using Renewable Fuels
- Geothermal Electric
- Hydroelectric
- Hydroelectric (Small)
- Landfill gas
- Microturbines
- Municipal solid waste
- Solar photovoltaics
- Solar thermal electric
- Wind (All), Biomass
- Wind (Small)

Sectors that can use net metering include commercial, industrial, local government, nonprofits, residential homes, schools, state and federal government, agricultural, and institutional.

The types of utilities that can participate in net metering are investor-owned utilities and electric cooperatives.

Utilities that can participate are investor-owned utilities and electric cooperatives. When a customer leaves the utility, the utility must pay the customer for any unused credits.

=== Availability and jurisdiction ===
According to DSIRE, “Net metering is available to all "qualifying facilities" (QFs), as defined by the federal Public Utility Regulatory Policies Act of 1978 (PURPA), which pertains to renewable energy systems and combined heat and power systems up to 80 megawatts (MW) in capacity. There is no statewide cap on the aggregate capacity of net-metered systems.”

Additionally, all utilities that are subject regulation under the Public Regulation Commission’s (PRC) jurisdiction must offer net metering. Municipal utilities, which are not regulated by the PRC, are exempt.

== Solar in New Mexico ==
=== Growth ===
In New Mexico, the decrease in prices for solar systems is driving the market for it. Many homeowners and commercial companies are purchasing solar systems to help offset the increase in electric utility bills. More financing options are available today in New Mexico, more solar companies are competing, and this is leading to an increase in market penetration.

The growth is predicted at 20% per year. As of early 2016, the market in the United States for solar systems had reached 1 million solar installations. This is equivalent to generating enough electricity to power 5.4 million homes, according to the national Solar Energy Industry Association.

According to the Albuquerque Journal, “New Mexico ranks 8th in the nation today in terms of installed solar capacity per capita.” It is estimated that the solar market in New Mexico has only experienced approximately 10% of market penetration.

=== Solar capacity and statistics ===
According to the Albuquerque Journal, “As of year-end 2015, New Mexico had about 400 megawatts of installed capacity. That includes 85 MW of residential and commercial systems, and 316 MW of utility-scale generation scattered throughout the service territories of New Mexico’s public utilities and electric cooperatives.”

For all the installed solar capacity in the New Mexico, the Public Service Company of New Mexico accounts for around 41% of that. Their facilities include fifteen different projects with a total of 107 MW of capacity, which according to the company, provides enough power 140,000 average homes.

New Mexico requires public utilities to get 15% of their electric generation from renewable sources. That number will increase to 20% by the year 2020.

Within the state, sixty different contracting and installation companies operate. These firms include national companies like SolarCity and ZingSolar.

== Consumer incentives ==
=== State tax credit ===
Up until the end of 2016, New Mexico offered a 10% state tax credit for solar installations. The tax credit began in 2008.

Solar companies operating in New Mexico say they are okay to absorb the loss of the state tax credit, meaning that they don't believe it will affect their business. However, in addition to the loss of the tax credit, renewable energy payments from utilities to customers is also declining.

=== Federal tax credit ===
In addition to the state tax credit, which is over, the U.S. government gives a 30 percent tax credit for solar installations. In December 2015, Congress extended the program through the end of 2019.

=== Payments from utilities ===
PNM and El Paso Electric Co. in southern New Mexico paid customers for each kilowatt hour of electricity they produced from their solar systems. These payments help customers and businesses offset the costs of installing their solar systems.

In addition to the payments, those companies offer net metering. Under net metering, people with solar systems can sell their excess electricity back to the utility company at a price equal to what the utility pays for its own electricity. Note that net metering is a separate system of payments from the renewable payments that utilities offer back to customers.

For example, 7,100 customers have signed up for the renewable payments from the utility PNM. In 2014, that number was only 4,400 customers.

Payments from utilities back to customers decreased from $.13 per kilowatt hour in 2009 to $.025 by the end of 2015. As of the middle of 2016, PNM stopped accepting new applications because the number of people seeking the credits was more than the money available in the program.

According to DSIRE, a program operated by the N.C. Clean Energy Technology Center at North Carolina State University funded by the U.S. Department of Energy, “If a customer has NEG [net energy generation] totaling less than $50 during a monthly billing period, the excess is carried over to the customer’s next monthly bill. If NEG exceeds $50 during a monthly billing period, the utility will pay the customer the following month for the excess.

“The energy rate to be paid for the energy supplied by the QF [qualifying facility] in any month shall be the respective month's rate from the utility's current schedule on file with the PRC. Each utility shall file with the PRC its schedule containing monthly energy rates that will be applicable to the next twelve-month period.”

== Price of solar installation ==
According to a study by Lawrence Livermore National Laboratory, prices for the installation of residential and utility-scale solar generation plants went down by more than 50 percent between 2008 and 2014. In 2015, prices fell another 17 percent.

As of 2017, an average New Mexico residential system producing 4.4 kilowatts costs approximately $17,000 before tax credits and other incentives. After credits and incentives, the system would cost approximately $11,900. In 2009, that same system had cost $30,000. If a consumer chose to finance the system, they could pay around $99 a month.

== Regulatory rules ==
In New Mexico there are two primary rules that govern the interconnection of a solar system to the utility grid:

- NMPRC Rule 570 (general interconnection of qualifying facilities—larger solar-producing facilities)
- NMPRC Rule 571 (net metering for small renewable energy systems)

According to the New Mexico Solar Energy Association, “These rules apply wherever electricity service is regulated by the PRC. This includes the areas serviced by New Mexico's four investor owned utilities (IOUs) (which encompasses Santa Fe and Albuquerque for example), and the areas services by electric coops. It does not include municipal utilities (such as Los Alamos and Farmington), which are self-regulated.”

Additionally, “If the net-metered facility uses more power than it produces over a billing period, the utility may bill the customer for the net power used according to the rate structure that would apply to the customer if they had not connected as a net-metering facility.”

== Future of net metering in New Mexico ==
The solar industry in New Mexico is facing hurdles. Most utilities want to reduce incentives like net metering and charge customers more who have solar systems. The reason they want to do this is because the utilities maintain that their role in generating plants, transmitting and distributing electricity through distribution lines, and other fixed costs remain unchanged. They argue that solar customers are not financially contributing to those fixed costs.
