= Dianne Martin (Canadian lawyer) =

Dianne Lee Martin (1945–2004) was a pioneering Canadian lawyer and advocate for social justice and women's rights.

== Early life and education ==
Martin was born in Regina, Saskatchewan on March 19, 1945. She earned a bachelor's of arts degree of the University of Toronto in 1973 and a law degree from Osgoode Hall in 1976. In 1983 earned a master's degree in law from the University of London (England).

== Practice ==
When Martin was called to the bar in 1978, there were very few women practicing law in Canada and the legal establishment was often hostile and dismissive towards them. Martin practiced with various partners, and in the first decade of her career she successfully advocated for a number of Criminal Code reforms, including replacing the crimes of "rape" and "indecent exposure" with "sexual assault" (emphasizing the violent nature of the crime, rather than the sexual nature).

In 1981, Martin became director of Osgoode Hall's Parkdale Community Legal Services clinic, and in 1989 she joined the faculty as an associate professor. She and her colleague Alan Young co-founded the school's Innocence Project, in which students investigated suspected cases of wrongful convictions.

== Honours ==
- 2001 "Rebel with a Cause", Elizabeth Fry Society
- 2003 Gold Key Award, Osgoode Hall Alumni Association
- 2005 "Woman of Distinction", YWCA (posthumous)
- 2005 Sidney B. Linden Award, Legal Aid Ontario (posthumous)

== Legacy ==
Martin died of a heart attack at her home in Toronto on December 20, 2004.

Osgoode Hall established an annual Dianne Martin Medal for Social Justice Through Law award, which is granted to "a member of the Canadian legal community who has exemplified Dianne Martin’s commitment to law as an instrument for achieving social justice and fairness."

In 2008, the University of Toronto Press published Honouring Social Justice, a collection of essays examining social, judicial, and political issues, honouring Martin's life and work.
