= Idaho Public Utilities Commission =

State agency in Idaho, United States

The Idaho Public Utilities Commission is a public utilities commission, a quasi-judicial tribunal, which regulates investor-owned or privately owned utilities that provide gas, water, electricity, or telephone service for profit in the U.S. state of Idaho, such as Idaho Power, Intermountain Gas, Qwest, and United Water of Idaho. The Commission does not regulate utility cooperatives (owned by customers) or utilities operated by municipalities.
