= New Hampshire Public Utilities Commission =

Government agency in the U.S. state of New Hampshire

New Hampshire Public Utilities Commission (NHPUC)
Agency overview
- Formed: September 1, 1951
- Preceding agencies: Public Service Commission (1911–1951); State Board of Railroad Commissioners (1844–1911)
- Jurisdiction: New Hampshire
- Headquarters: 21 South Fruit Street; Concord, New Hampshire
- Employees: 18
- Agency executive: Daniel C. Goldner, Chairman
- Website: www.puc.nh.gov

The New Hampshire Public Utilities Commission (NHPUC) is a government agency of the U.S. state of New Hampshire. Headquartered in Concord, it is a public utilities commission with jurisdiction over electric, natural gas, water and sewer utilities as defined by New Hampshire statute for matters such as rates, quality of service, finance, accounting, and safety.

The NHPUC is made up of three commissioners, appointed by the Governor of New Hampshire and confirmed by the Governor's Council. The commissioners serve staggered six-year terms. Administration of the commission is overseen by an executive director.

The New Hampshire Public Utilities Commission was formerly known as the New Hampshire Public Service Commission.
