= Public Service Commission of Utah =

The State of Utah Public Service Commission regulates the energy, telecommunications, gas and water companies located in Utah. It has been known by that title since 1935; prior to that it was the Utah Utilities Commission. Its members are nominated by the governor of Utah and confirmed by the Utah State Senate.

== See also ==
- United States energy law
- Public Utilities Commission
