= Arkansas Public Service Commission =

American government agency

- Great Seal of Arkansas

Agency overview
- Formed: March 11, 1899 (127 years ago)
- Preceding agencies: Arkansas Railroad Commission; Arkansas Corporation Commission
- Jurisdiction: Arkansas
- Headquarters: 1000 Center Street, Little Rock, Arkansas 72201; 34°44′21.7″N 92°16′29.4″W
- Agency executive: Bill Taylor, Chairman of the Public Service Commission
- Website: apsc.arkansas.gov

The Arkansas Public Service Commission (APSC) regulates the service and rates of those utilities subject to its jurisdiction in the State of Arkansas, United States. It was originally created by the Arkansas General Assembly on March 11, 1899, as the Arkansas Railroad Commission and was limited to regulating the railroads. Today the APSC regulates telephone service, natural gas lines, pipeline safety, and electricity.

== See also ==
- United States energy law
