= Nevada Public Utilities Commission =

U.S. state government agency

Public Utilities Commission of Nevada
Commission overview
- Jurisdiction: Nevada
- Headquarters: 1150 E. William Street, Carson City, Nevada; 9075 West Diablo Drive, Suite 250, Las Vegas, Nevada
- Employees: 96 (2016-17)
- Annual budget: $14.4 million (2016-17)
- Commission executive: Hayley Williamson, Chairman
- Website: puc.nv.gov

The Public Utilities Commission of Nevada supervises and regulates the operation and maintenance of utility services in Nevada. The agency has two headquarters, one in Carson City (39.170841°N 119.756725°W) and one in Las Vegas (36.088245°N 115.290164°W).

== History ==
The Railroad Commission of Nevada was established in 1907. The Public Service Commission of Nevada was formed in 1911, sharing the same commissioners, personnel, and offices of the Railroad Commission. In 1919, the responsibilities of the two bodies were consolidated under a new Public Service Commission. The commission was renamed as the Public Utilities Commission in 1997, when its duties relating to trucking, taxis, and other transport issues were moved to the newly formed Transportation Services Authority.

== Commissioners ==
The commission is run by three commissioners. As of September 2022, the commissioners are:

- Hayley Williamson (Chairman)
- C.J. Manthe
- Tammy Cordova

Cordova is the newest member of the commission.

According to Utility Dive, the commission has “a full slate of commissioners, and none of them were involved in the contentious net metering debate two years ago.”

== See also ==
- List of Nevada state agencies
