= Net metering =

Type of billing of electricity generated from renewable sources

Net metering (or net energy metering, NEM) is an electricity billing mechanism that allows consumers who generate some or all of their own electricity to use that electricity at any time, instead of when it is generated. This is particularly important with renewable energy sources like wind and solar, which are non-dispatchable (when not coupled to storage). Monthly net metering allows consumers to use solar power generated during the day at night, or wind from a windy day later in the month. Annual net metering rolls over a net kilowatt-hour (kWh) credit to the following month, allowing solar power that was generated in July to be used in December, or wind power from March in August.

Net metering policies can vary significantly by country and by state or province: if net metering is available, if and how long banked credits can be retained, and how much the credits are worth (retail/wholesale). Most net metering laws involve monthly rollover of kWh credits, a small monthly connection fee, (Note: Electric bills contain a connection fee and an energy fee based on the number of kilowatt-hours used that month. When no kilowatt-hours are used the monthly connection fee is still paid. When the meter turns backward for the month, the negative kilowatt reading is rolled over to the next month.) require a monthly payment of deficits (i.e. normal electric bill), and annual settlement of any residual credit. Net metering uses a single, bi-directional meter and can measure the current flowing in two directions. Net metering can be implemented solely as an accounting procedure, and requires no special metering, or even any prior arrangement or notification.

Net metering is an enabling policy designed to foster private investment in renewable energy.

== History ==
Net metering originated in the United States, where small wind turbines and solar panels were connected to the electrical grid, and consumers wanted to be able to use the electricity generated at a different time or date from when it was generated. The first two projects to use net metering were an apartment complex and a solar test house in Massachusetts in 1979. Minnesota is commonly cited as passing the first net metering law, in 1983, and allowed anyone generating less than 40 kW to either roll over any credit to the next month, or be paid for the excess. In 2000 this was amended to compensation "at the average retail utility energy rate". This is the simplest and most general interpretation of net metering, and in addition allows small producers to sell electricity at the retail rate.

Utilities in Idaho adopted net metering in 1980, and in Arizona in 1981. Massachusetts adopted net metering in 1982. By 1998, 22 states or utilities therein had adopted net metering. Two California utilities initially adopted a monthly "net metering" charge, which included a "standby charge", until the Public Utilities Commission (PUC) banned such charges. In 2005, all U.S. utilities were required to consider adopting rules offering net metering "upon request" by the Energy Policy Act of 2005. Excess generation is not addressed. As of 2013, 43 U.S. states have adopted net metering, as well as utilities in 3 of the remaining states, leaving only 4 states without any established procedures for implementing net metering. However, a 2017 study showed that only 3% of U.S. utilities offer full retail compensation for net metering with the remainder offering less than retail rates, having credit expire annually, or some form of indefinite rollover.

Net metering was slow to be adopted in Europe, especially in the United Kingdom, because of confusion over how to address the value added tax (VAT). Only one utility company in Great Britain offers net metering.

The United Kingdom government is reluctant to introduce the net metering principle because of complications in paying and refunding the value added tax that is payable on electricity, but pilot projects are underway in some areas.

In Canada, some provinces have net metering programs.

In the Philippines, Net Metering scheme is governed by Republic Act 9513 (Renewable Energy Act of 2008) and its implementing rules and regulation (IRR). The implementing body is the Energy Regulatory Commission (ERC) in consultation with the National Renewable Energy Board (NREB). Unfortunately, the scheme is not a true net metering scheme but in reality a net billing scheme. As the Dept of Energy's Net Metering guidelines say, "Net-metering allows customers of Distribution Utilities (DUs) to install an on-site Renewable Energy (RE) facility not exceeding 100 kilowatts (kW) in capacity so they can generate electricity for their own use. Any electricity generated that is not consumed by the customer is automatically exported to the DU's distribution system. The DU then gives a peso credit for the excess electricity received equivalent to the DU’s blended generation cost, excluding other generation adjustments, and deducts the credits earned to the customer’s electric bill."

Thus Philippine consumers who generate their own electricity and sell their surplus to the utility are paid what is called the "generation cost" which is often less than 50% of the retail price of electricity.

== Controversy ==
Net metering is controversial as it affects different interests on the grid. A report prepared by Peter Kind of Energy Infrastructure Advocates for the trade association Edison Electric Institute stated that distributed generation systems, like rooftop solar, present unique challenges to the future of electric utilities. Utilities in the United States have led a largely unsuccessful campaign to eliminate net metering.

=== Benefits ===
Renewable advocates point out that while distributed solar and other energy efficiency measures do pose a challenge to electric utilities' existing business model, the benefits of distributed generation outweigh the costs, and those benefits are shared by all ratepayers. Grid benefits of private distributed solar investment include reduced need for centralizing power plants and reduced strain on the utility grid. They also point out that, as a cornerstone policy enabling the growth of rooftop solar, net metering creates a host of societal benefits for all ratepayers that are generally not accounted for by the utility analysis, including: public health benefits, employment and downstream economic effects, market price impacts, grid security benefits, and water savings.

An independent report conducted by the consulting firm Crossborder Energy found that the benefits of California's net metering program outweigh the costs to ratepayers. Those net benefits will amount to more than US$92 million annually upon the completion of the current net metering program.

A 2012 report on the cost of net metering in the State of California, commissioned by the California Public Utilities Commission (CPUC), showed that those customers without distributed generation systems will pay US$287 in additional costs to use and maintain the grid every year by 2020. The report also showed the net cost will amount to US$1.1 billion by 2020. Notably, the same report found that solar customers do pay more on their power bills than what it costs the utility to serve them (Table 5, page 10: average 103% of their cost of service across the three major utilities in 2011).

=== Drawbacks ===
Many electric utilities state that owners of generation systems do not pay the full cost of service to use the grid, thus shifting their share of the cost onto customers without distributed generation systems. Most owners of rooftop solar or other types of distributed generation systems still rely on the grid to receive electricity from utilities at night or when their systems cannot generate sufficient power.

A 2014 report funded by the Institute for Electric Innovation (which engages in lobbying for the benefit of its member electricity companies) claims that net metering in California produces excessively large subsidies for typical residential rooftop solar photovoltaic (PV) facilities. These subsidies must then be paid for by other residential customers, most of whom are less affluent than the rooftop solar PV customers. In addition, the report points out that most of these large subsidies go to the solar leasing companies, which accounted for about 75 percent of the solar PV facilities installed in 2013. The report concludes that changes are needed in California, ranging from the adoption of retail tariffs that are more cost-reflective to replacing net metering with a separate "Buy All - Sell All" arrangement that requires all rooftop solar PV customers to buy all of their consumed energy under the existing retail tariffs and separately sell all of their onsite generation to their distribution utilities at the utilities' respective avoided costs.

== Post-net metering successor tariffs ==
On a nationwide basis, energy officials have debated replacement programs for net metering for several years. As of 2018, a few "replicable models" have emerged. Utility companies have always contended that customers with solar get their bills reduced by too much under net metering, and as a result, that shifts costs for keeping up the grid infrastructure to the rest of the non-solar customers. "The policy has led to heated state-level debates since 2003 over whether — and how — to construct a successor to the policy," according to Utility Dive. The key challenge to constructing pricing and rebate schemes in a post-net metering environment is how to compensate rooftop solar customers fairly while not imposing costs on non-solar customers. Experts have said that a good "successor tariff," as the post-net metering policies have been called, is one that supports the growth of distributed energy resources in a way where customers and the grid get benefits from it.

Thirteen states swapped successor tariffs for retail rate net metering programs in 2017. In 2018, three more states made similar changes. For example, compensation in Nevada will go down over time, but today the compensation is at the retail rate (meaning, solar customers who send energy to the grid get compensated at the same rate they pay for electricity). In Arizona, the new solar rate is ten percent below the retail rate.

The two most common successor tariffs are called "net billing" and "buy-all-sell-all" (BASA). "Net billing pays the retail rate for customer-consumed PV generation and a below retail rate for exported generation. With BASA, the utility both charges and compensates at a below-retail rate."

== Comparison ==
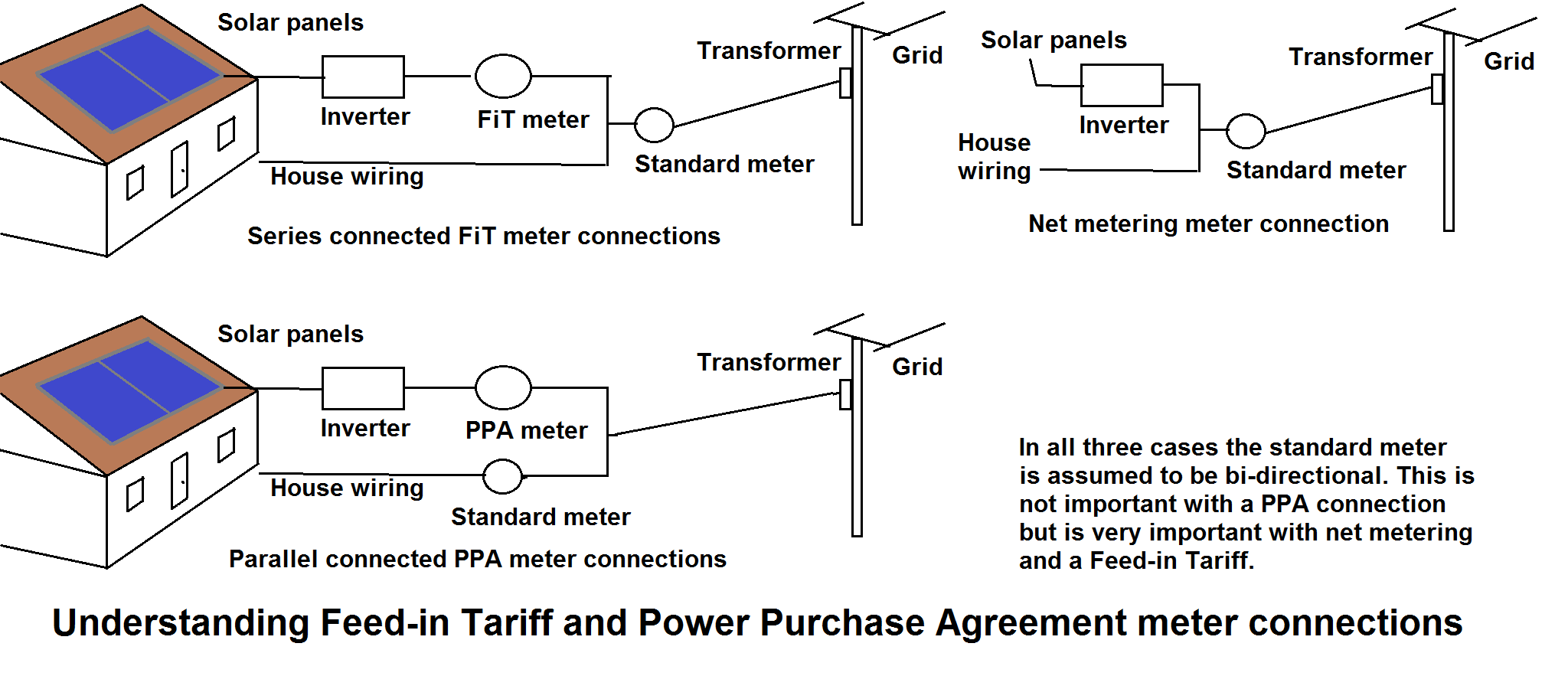
Net metering, unlike a feed-in tariff, requires only one meter, but it must be bi-directional.

There is considerable confusion between the terms "net metering" and "feed-in tariff" (FIT). In general there are three types of compensation for local, distributed generation:

1. Net metering: always at retail, and which is not technically compensation, although it may become compensation if there is excess generation and payments are allowed by the utility.
2. Feed-in tariff: generally above retail, and reduces to retail as the percentage of adopters increases.
3. Power purchase agreement: Compensation generally below retail, also known as a "Standard Offer Program", can be above retail, particularly in the case of solar, which tends to be generated close to peak demand.

Net metering only requires one meter. A feed-in tariff requires two.

== Time of use metering ==
Time of use (TOU) net metering employs a smart (electric) meter that is programmed to determine electricity usage any time during the day. Time-of-use allows utility rates and charges to be assessed based on when the electricity was used (i.e., day/night and seasonal rates). Typically the generation cost of electricity is highest during the daytime peak usage period at sunset, and lowest in the middle of night. Time of use metering is a significant issue for renewable-energy sources, since, for example, solar power systems tend to produce most energy at noon and produce little power during the daytime peak-price period (see also duck curve), and no power during the night period when price is low. California, Italy and Australia have installed so many photovoltaic cells that peak prices no longer are during the day, but are instead in the evening. TOU net metering affects the apparent cost of net metering to a utility.

== Market rate net metering ==
In market rate net metering systems the user's energy use is priced dynamically according to some function of wholesale electric prices. The users' meters are programmed remotely to calculate the value and are read remotely. Net metering applies such variable pricing to excess power produced by a qualifying system.

Market rate metering systems were implemented in California starting in 2006, and under the terms of California's net metering rules will be applicable to qualifying photovoltaic and wind systems. Under California law the payback for surplus electricity sent to the grid must be equal to the (variable, in this case) price charged at that time.

Net metering enables small systems to result in zero annual net cost to the consumer provided that the consumer is able to shift demand loads to a lower price time, such as by chilling water at a low cost time for later use in air conditioning, or by charging a battery electric vehicle during off-peak times, while the electricity generated at peak demand time can be sent to the grid rather than used locally (see Vehicle-to-grid). No credit is given for annual surplus production.

== Excess generation ==
Excess generation is a separate issue from net metering, but it is normally dealt with in the same rules, because it can arise. If local generation offsets a portion of the demand, net metering is not used. If local generation exceeds demand some of the time, for example during the day, net metering is used. If local generation exceeds demand for the billing cycle, best practices calls for a perpetual roll over of the kilowatt-hour credits, although some regions have considered having any kWh credits expire after 36 months. The normal definition of excess generation is annually, although the term is equally applicable monthly. The treatment of annual excess generation (and monthly) ranges from lost, to compensation at avoided cost, to compensation at retail rate. Left over kWh credits upon termination of service would ideally be paid at retail rate, from the consumer standpoint, and lost, from the utility standpoint, with avoided cost a minimum compromise. Some regions allow optional payment for excess annual generation, which allows perpetual roll over or payment, at the customers choice. Both wind and solar are inherently seasonal, and it is highly likely to use up a surplus later, unless more solar panels or a larger wind turbine have been installed than needed.

== Energy storage ==
Net metering systems can have energy storage integrated, to store some of the power locally (i.e. from the renewable energy source connected to the system) rather than selling everything to the mains electricity grid. Often, the batteries used are industrial deep cycle batteries as these last for 10 to 20 years. Other types of batteries with shorter lifespans, like Lead-acid (around 5 years) and Lithium-ion, are also still used. Finally, nickel-iron batteries last the longest with a lifespan of up to 40 years. A 2017 study of solar panels with battery storage indicated an 8 to 14 percent extra consumption of electricity from charging and discharging batteries.

== Adoption by country ==
=== Australia ===
In some Australian states, the "feed-in tariff" is actually net metering, except that it pays monthly for net generation at a higher rate than retail, with Environment Victoria Campaigns Director Mark Wakeham calling it a "fake feed-in tariff." A feed-in tariff requires a separate meter, and pays for all local generation at a preferential rate, while net metering requires only one meter. The financial differences are very substantial.

In Victoria, from 2009, householders were paid 60 cents for every excess kilowatt hour of energy fed into the state electricity grid. This was around three times the retail price for electricity at that time. However, subsequent state governments reduced the feed-in in several updates, until in 2016 the feed-in is as low as 5 cents per kilowatt hour.

In Queensland starting in 2008, the Solar Bonus Scheme pays 44 cents for every excess kilowatt hour of energy fed into the state electricity grid. This is around three times the current retail price for electricity. However, from 2012, the Queensland feed in tariff has been reduced to 6-10 cents per kilowatt hour depending on which electricity retailer the customer has signed up with.

Australian smart grid technologist, Steve Hoy, originated the opposing concept of "True Zero", as opposed to "Net Zero", to express the emerging capability to trace electricity through net metering. The meter allows consumers to trace their electricity to the source, making clean energy more accessible to everyone.

=== Canada ===
Ontario allows net metering for systems up to 500 kW, however credits can only be carried for 12 consecutive months. Should a consumer establish a credit where they generate more than they consume for 8 months and use up the credits in the 10th month, then the 12-month period begins again from the date that the next credit is shown on an invoice. Any unused credits remaining at the end of 12 consecutive months of a consumer being in a credit situation are cleared at the end of that billing.

Areas of British Columbia serviced by BC Hydro are allowed net metering for up to 100 kW. At each annual anniversary on March 1 the customer is paid a market price, calculated as daily average mid-Columbia price for a previous year. FortisBC which serves an area in South Central BC also allows net-metering for up to 50 kW. Customers are paid their existing retail rate for any net energy they produce. The City of New Westminster, which has its own electrical utility, also allows net metering.

New Brunswick allows net metering for installations up to 100 kW. Credits from excess generated power can be carried over until March at which time any excess credits are lost.

SaskPower allows net metering for installations up to 100 kW. Credits from excess generated power can be carried over until the customer's annual anniversary date, at which time any excess credits are lost.

In Nova Scotia, in 2015, 43 residences and businesses began using solar panels for electricity. By 2017, the number was up to 133. These customers’ solar systems are net metered. The excess power produced by the solar panels is bought from the homeowner by Nova Scotia Power at the same rate that the utility sells it to its customers. “The downside for Nova Scotia Power is that it must maintain the capacity to produce electricity even when it is not sunny.” In 2022, Nova Scotia increased the net metering cap for "small general class" businesses to 200 kW, and for large commercial customers to 1000 kW. As of 2024, 7000 Nova Scotians had installed solar. As of 31 December 2024, there were 45 active commercial net metering generators totalling 4.1 MW, and 11 102 legacy net metering customers (including 58 with wind, 1with hydro, and 6 six "other/combination") with a nameplate capacity of 97.7 MW. This was over double the projection of 39 MW published in 2020 for 2025.

=== European Union ===
Denmark established net-metering for privately owned PV systems in mid-1998 for a pilot-period of four years. In 2002 the net-metering scheme was extended another four years up to end of 2006. Net-metering has proved to be a cheap, easy to administer and effective way of stimulating the deployment of PV in Denmark; however the relative short time window of the arrangement has so far prevented it from reaching its full potential. During the political negotiations in the fall of 2005 the net-metering for privately owned PV systems was made permanent.

The Netherlands has net-metering since 2004. Initially there was a limit of 3000 kWh per year. Later this limit was increased to 5000 kWh. The limit was removed altogether on January 1, 2014.

Italy offers a support scheme, mixing net-metering and a well segmented premium FiT.

Slovenia has annual net-metering since January 2016 for up to 11 kVA. In a calendar year up to 10 MVA can be installed in the country.

In 2010, Spain, net-metering has been proposed by the Asociación de la Industria Fotovoltaica (ASIF) to promote renewable electricity, without requiring additional economic support. Net-metering for privately owned systems will be established in 2019, after Royal Decree 244/2019 was accepted by the government on April 5.

Some form of net metering is now proposed by Électricité de France. According to their website, energy produced by home-owners is bought at a higher price than what is charged as consumers. Hence, some recommend to sell all energy produced, and buy back all energy needed at a lower price. The price has been fixed for 20 years by the government.

Ireland is planning to implement a net metering system, under the "Micro-generation Support Scheme".

Under the proposed scheme, micro-generators can sell 30% of the excess electricity they produce and export it back to the grid. The price that electricity will be sold at is being formulated during the consultation process.

Poland has introduced net metering for private and commercial renewable energy sources of up to 50 kW in 2015. Under this legislation energy sent to grid must be used within one year from feed-in, otherwise it is considered as lost. The amount of energy that was exported and can be taken back by the user is subtracted by 20% for installations up to 10 kW, or by 30% for installations up to 50 kW. This legislation guarantees that this net metering policy will be kept for a minimum of 15 years from the moment of registering renewable energy source. This legislation together with government subsidies for microgeneration created a substantial boost in installations of PV systems in Poland.

Portugal has a very limited form of "net-metering" that is constrained to 15 minute periods where the excess injected in the grid is not compensated when above the consumption from the grid within each 15 minute period. Only the injected energy up to the consumed energy within the same 15 minute period is netted out of the final monthly bill. In fact the old analog electricity meters that would allow for true net-metering are immediately replaced when a consumer installs solar pv.

=== India ===
Almost every state in India has implemented net-metering, wherein, the consumers are allowed to sell the surplus energy generated by their solar system to the grid and get compensated for the same. However, the net-metering policy is not common throughout the country and varies from state to state.

To avail of net-metering in the country, the consumer is required to submit an application with the local electricity distribution company along with the planned rooftop solar project and requisite fee. The distribution company reviews the application and the feasibility of the solar project, which is either approved or rejected. If approved, another application for registration of the rooftop is submitted to the distribution company. An agreement is signed between the consumer and the company, and the net-meter is installed.

The Indian states of Karnataka and Andhra Pradesh have started the implementation of net metering, and the policy was announced by the respective state electricity boards in 2014. After review and inspection by the electricity board, a bidirectional meter is installed. Applications are taken up for up to 30% of the distribution transformer capacity on a first-come, first-served basis and technical feasibility.

Since September 2015, Maharashtra state (MERC) has also had a net metering policy and consumers have started installation of Solar Rooftop Grid Tie Net metering systems. MERC Policy allows up to 40% transformer capacity to be on Solar net metering.

The various DISCOMs in Maharashtra namely MSEDCL, Tata, Reliance and Torrent Power are expected to support net metering.

As of now MSEDCL does not use the TOD (Time of The Day differential) charging tariffs for residential consumers and net metering. Export and import units are considered at par for calculating Net Units and bill amount.

=== United States ===
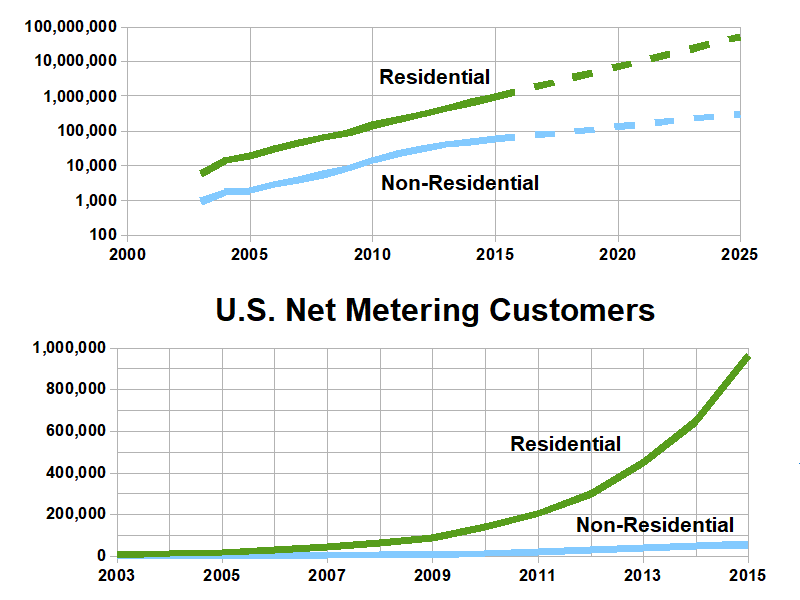
Growth of net metering in the United States

Net metering is a policy by many states in the United States designed to help the adoption of renewable energy. Net metering was pioneered in the United States as a way to allow solar and wind to provide electricity whenever available and allow use of that electricity whenever it was needed, beginning with utilities in Idaho in 1980, and in Arizona in 1981. In 1983, Minnesota passed the first state net metering law. As of March 2015, 44 states and Washington, D.C. have developed mandatory net metering rules for at least some utilities. However, although the states' rules are clear, few utilities actually compensate at full retail rates.

Net metering policies are determined by states, which have set policies varying on a number of key dimensions. The Energy Policy Act of 2005 required state electricity regulators to "consider" (but not necessarily implement) rules that mandate public electric utilities make net metering available to their customers upon request. Several legislative bills have been proposed to institute a federal standard limit on net metering. They range from H.R. 729, which sets a net metering cap at 2% of forecasted aggregate customer peak demand, to H.R. 1945, which has no aggregate cap, but does limit residential users to 10 kW, a low limit compared to many states, such as New Mexico, with an 80,000 kW limit, or states such as Arizona, Colorado, New Jersey, and Ohio, which limit as a percentage of load.

== Net purchase and sale ==
Net purchase and sale is a different method of providing power to the electricity grid that does not offer the price symmetry of net metering, making this system a lot less profitable for home users of small renewable electricity systems.

Under this arrangement, two uni-directional meters are installed—one records electricity drawn from the grid, and the other records excess electricity generated and fed into the grid. The user pays retail rate for the electricity they use, and the power provider purchases their excess generation at its avoided cost (wholesale rate). There may be a significant difference between the retail rate the user pays and the power provider's avoided cost.

Some jurisdictions, such as Germany, Spain, the province of Ontario in Canada, and some states in the United States, compensate the generated electricity at a fixed rate, in a scheme called feed-in tariff (FIT). With the FIT, customers get paid for any electricity they generate from renewable energy on their premises. The actual electricity being generated is counted on a separate meter, not just the surplus they feed to the grid. Germany once paid several times the retail rate for solar but has reduced the rates drastically while actual installation of solar has grown exponentially at the same time due to reduced cost of solar installations. Wind energy, in contrast, only receives around a half of the domestic retail rate, because the German system pays what each source costs (including a reasonable profit margin).

== Virtual net metering ==
Another method of producing power to the grid is through virtual net metering (also called peer-to-peer (P2P) energy trading, wheeling and sometimes local energy trading). Peer-to-peer energy trading is a novel paradigm of power system operation, where sellers can generate their own energy in dwellings, offices and factories, and share it with each other locally. Several companies offering virtual net metering use blockchain technology.

== Related technology ==
Sources that produce direct current, such as solar panels, must be coupled with an electrical inverter to convert the output to alternating current for use with conventional appliances. The phase of the outgoing power must be synchronized with the grid, and a mechanism must be included to disconnect the feed in the event of grid failure. This is for safety – for example, workers repairing downed power lines must be protected from "downstream" sources, in addition to being disconnected from the main "upstream" distribution grid. Although a small generator lacks the power to energize a loaded line, this can happen if the line is isolated from other loads. Solar inverters are designed for safety – while one inverter could not energize a line, a thousand might. In addition, electrical workers are trained to treat every line as though it was live, even when they know it should be safe.

== See also ==
- Automatic meter reading
- Demand response
- Electricity meter
- Home energy upgrades from public utilities
- Interstate Renewable Energy Council
- Off-the-grid
- Power system automation
- Smart grid
- Uninterruptible power supply
- Utility submeter
- Variable pricing
- Virtual power plant
