= North Carolina Utilities Commission =

Agency overview
- Jurisdiction: State of North Carolina
- Headquarters: Dobbs Building, Raleigh, North Carolina
- Agency executive: William M. Brawley, Chairman
- Website: North Carolina Utilities Commission Website

The North Carolina Utilities Commission is a government agency that regulates the public utilities of the state of North Carolina, most notably electric, natural gas, and water and sewer utilities. The Commission also regulates the transportation of goods and public transportation such as charter buses and ferryboats.

The Commission consists of five members, including the chair of the Commission. On July 31, 2025, pursuant to N.C. Gen. Stat. 62-10(e) and Session Law 2024-57 – Subpart III-F, the Commission elected William M. Brawley to serve as the Commission’s chairman effective immediately, for a chairman term concluding on June 30, 2028.

== History ==
In 1891, the North Carolina General Assembly created the Railroad Commission to regulate the rates charged by railways, passenger boat services, telegraph services, and express companies. In 1893, the commission gained jurisdiction over telephone companies, and four years later it regulated street cars. In 1899, the Railroad Commission was replaced by the Corporation Commission, which assumed regulatory responsibility for the previous utilities as well as banks and savings and loan associations. Shortly thereafter the body was given some taxation responsibilities. Beginning in 1905, some of its duties were reassigned to new agencies. In 1913, the Corporation Commission was given responsibility for regulating water and hydroelectric utilities. In 1933, the commission was replaced by a single Utilities Commissioner and two assistant commissioners.

In 1941, the General Assembly created the North Carolina Utilities Commission, composed of three commissioners serving six-year terms. Two additional members and technical staff were added in 1949. The technical staff were assigned to divisions for accounting, electricity, telephones, motor passenger carriers, and motor freight. In 1975, the board was expanded from five to seven members. Two years later the General Assembly created the Public Staff of the Utilities Commission to supply it with technical advice. In 2024, the commission was shrunk from seven to five members.

== Powers and responsibilities ==
The Utilities Commission regulates electric companies, telephone companies, natural gas companies, water and sewer utilities, moving companies, buses, brokers, and ferry lines in the state of North Carolina. It is empowered by state law to make rules and establish utility rates. It is required to publish two annual reports every year, one summarizing the legal and economic state of utilities in North Carolina and the other listing all of its rulings. The commissioners can hold hearings to gather testimony and evidence and have the same authority as the North Carolina Superior Court in compelling witnesses to testify or produce documentary evidence.

== Structure ==
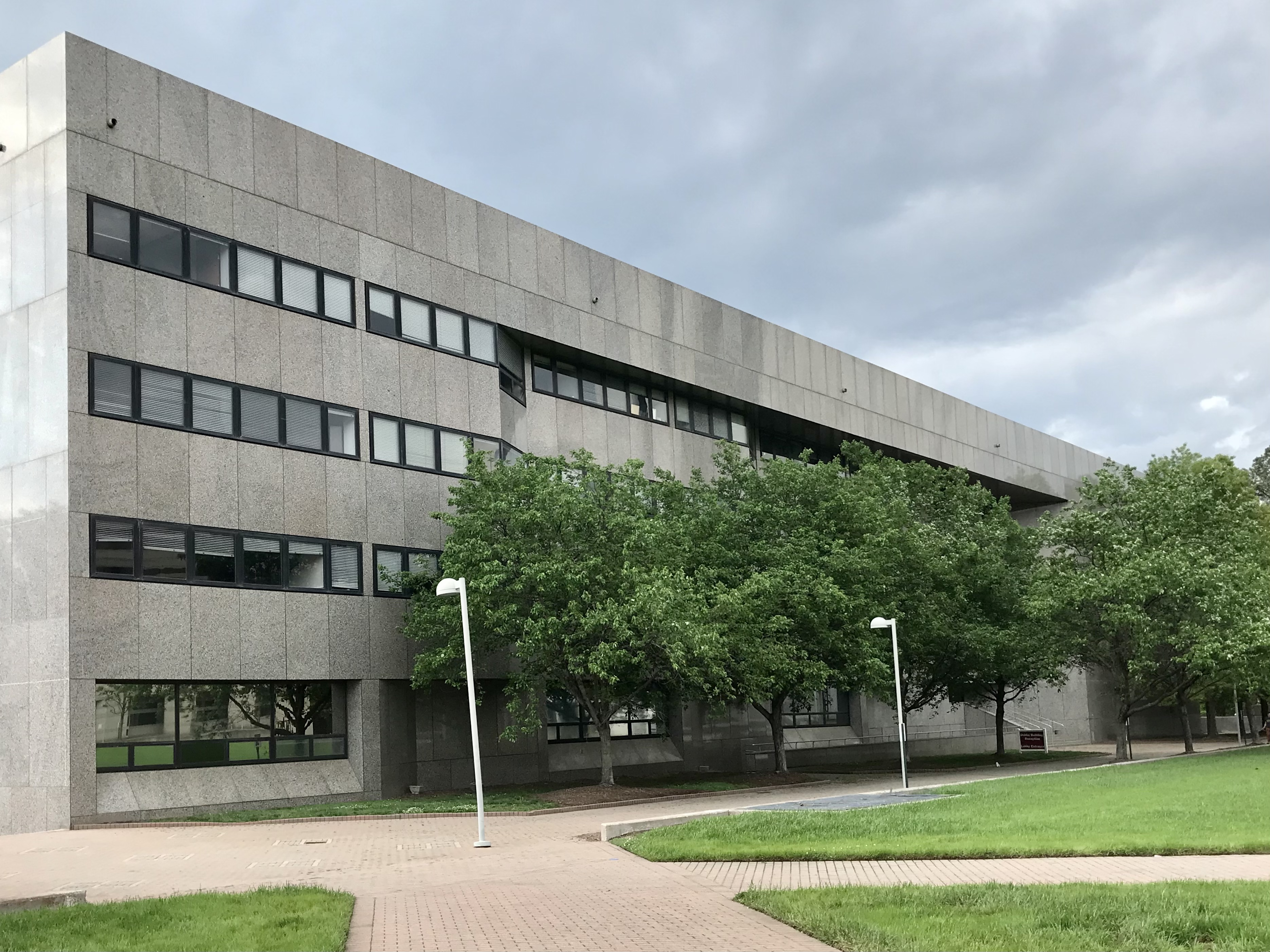
Dobbs Building in Raleigh

The Utilities Commission is led by seven commissioners. Each are appointed by the governor to a six-year term and confirmed by the General Assembly. The governor also names one of the commissioners to chair the body. The chair serves as the chief executive of the agency and is an ex officio member of the Agency for Public Telecommunications Board and the Geographic Information Coordinating Council. For the purpose of official meetings and decisions, a majority of the commissioners constitutes a quorum. Hearings are often conducted by panels of three commissioners. The commissioners are by law bound to the same standards of conduct as judges in the state.

The commission is headquartered in the Dobbs Building in Raleigh. It employs about 71 staffers in four divisions: Legal & Administration, Operations, Clerk & IT Services, and Fiscal Management. The Public Staff of the Utilities Commission is an independent agency over which the commissioners exercise no control. Led by an executive director appointed by the governor, it advises the commission on the appropriateness of rates charged and quality of service delivered by utilities.

== Major Utilities ==
The North Carolina Utilities Commission regulates 14 types of companies. There are three main categories of major public utilities regulated by the Commission: Electric, Natural Gas, and Water & Sewer. The major companies for each of these categories are listed below. For a complete list of companies regulated by the North Carolina Utilities Commission, you can visit the Commission's Regulated Companies page.

=== Major Electric Companies ===
- Duke Energy Carolinas, LLC (previously Duke Power)
- Duke Energy Progress, LLC (previously Carolina Power & Light)
- Dominion Energy North Carolina (d/b/a Virginia Electric & Power Co.)
- New River Light and Power
- Western Carolina University Power

=== Major Gas Companies ===
- Frontier Natural Gas Company
- Piedmont Natural Gas Company, Inc.
- Public Service Company of NC, Inc. (d/b/a Enbridge Gas North Carolina)
- Toccoa Natural Gas

=== Major Water and Sewer Companies ===
- Aqua North Carolina, Inc.
- Carolina Water Service, Inc.
- Old North State Water Company, Inc.
- Pluris Hampstead, LLC
- Red Bird Utility Operating Company, LLC (d/b/a Red Bird Water)
- Scientific Water and Sewer Corporation

== Current commissioners ==
The current commissioners are:

William M. Brawley
Chairman

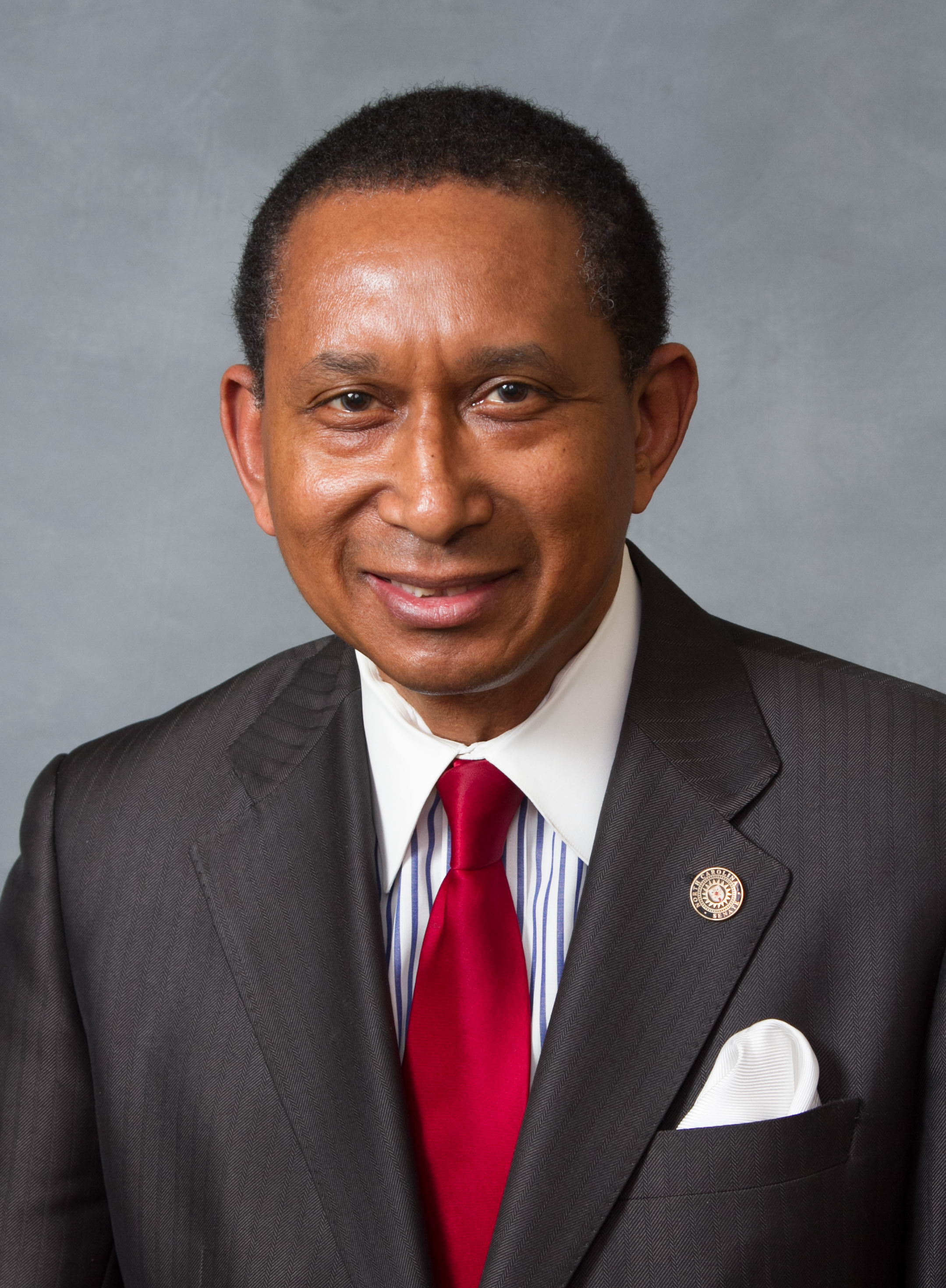
Floyd McKissick Jr. Commissioner

John W. Gajda Commissioner

Tommy Tucker Commissioner

Donald van der Vaart Commissioner

== See also ==
- Government of North Carolina
