= List of Bonanza episodes =

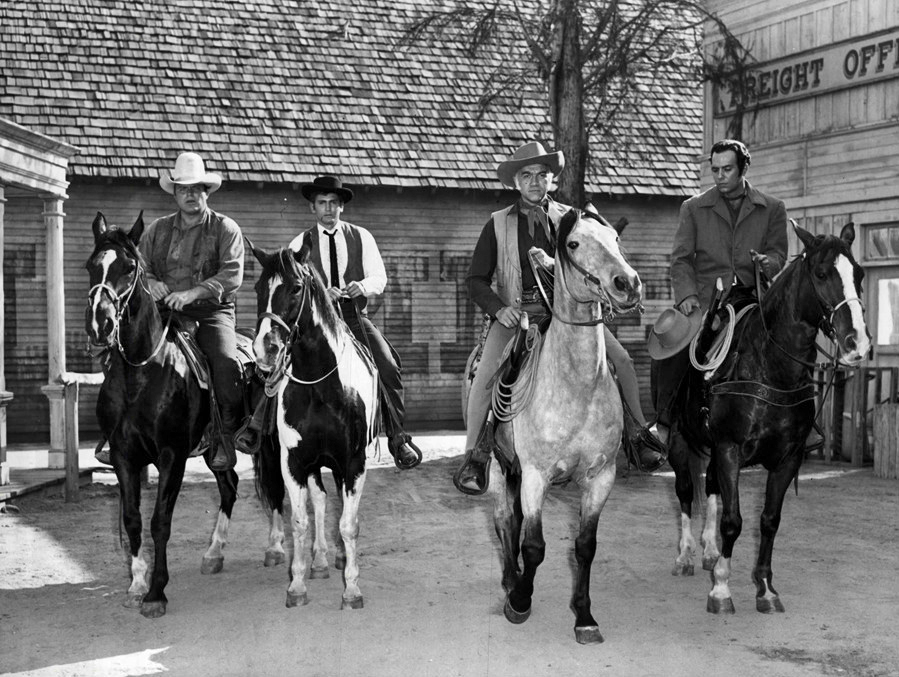
Cast of Bonanza in 1959

Bonanza is an American western television series developed and produced by David Dortort and broadcast in the United States for 14 seasons on the NBC network. The entire run of the series' 431 hour-long episodes was produced in color. The premiere was on September 12, 1959, and the final episode broadcast on January 16, 1973. In its initial season, Bonanza aired on Saturday evenings and placed at number 45 in the Nielsen ratings. During its second season, the series moved up to number 17. Bonanza was moved to Sundays at 9:00 PM Eastern Time at the start of its third season. In that time slot, the ratings soared and the series become second only to Wagon Train as the most popular program on American prime time television. It remained in the top ten of the ratings through its twelfth season and ranked at number one in its sixth, seventh, and eighth seasons. Bonanza also became a worldwide success as it was broadcast in nearly 50 countries, including Canada, Brazil, Yugoslavia, the United Kingdom, France, Italy, Switzerland, Saudi Arabia, Thailand, Australia, and Japan.

Bonanza is set on and around the Ponderosa Ranch, near Virginia City, Nevada, roughly between the years 1861 and 1867. The series chronicles the weekly adventures of the Cartwright family, consisting of Ben Cartwright (Lorne Greene) and his three sons (each by a different wife from whom he became widowed), Adam (Pernell Roberts), Eric "Hoss" (Dan Blocker), and Joseph (Michael Landon). Veteran actor Victor Sen Yung played the ranch cook, Hop Sing. In 1964, Pernell Roberts began expressing a desire to leave the series, so prospective replacements were introduced via Barry Coe as Little Joe's wayward, maternal half-brother Clay, and Guy Williams as Ben's nephew, Will Cartwright. However, Roberts was persuaded to complete his contract, and he remained through season six. The characters of Clay and Will were discontinued. In the ninth season, David Canary was added to the cast as ranch hand/foreman Candy Canady. After four years with the series, Canary left due to a contract dispute. In the twelfth season, Mitch Vogel joined the cast as Jamie Hunter, a teenage orphan who is adopted by Ben Cartwright. Following Dan Blocker's death in May 1972 after season thirteen ended, Greene, Landon, and Vogel continued the series into a fourteenth season, with Canary returning as Candy (reportedly approached by Landon) and Tim Matheson was introduced as ex-prisoner and newly hired ranch-hand Griff King. The program was moved to Tuesday nights where it slipped badly in the ratings to number 52 and was subsequently cancelled. Bonanza has, however, continued to be popular in syndication. From 1964 to 1967, Bonanza became the most watched show in the U.S.

All 14 seasons have been released on DVD in Region 1, both individually, and as a complete series box set.

== Series overview ==
Overview of Bonanza seasons
Season	Episodes	Originally released		Rank	Rating	Average viewership (in millions)	Timeslot (ET)
Season	Episodes	First released	Last released	Rank	Rating	Average viewership (in millions)	Timeslot (ET)
1	32	September 12, 1959	April 30, 1960	—N/a	—N/a	—N/a	Saturday 7:30 p.m.
2	34	September 10, 1960	June 3, 1961	17	24.8	11.7	TBA
3	34	September 24, 1961	May 20, 1962	2	30.0	14.6	Sunday 9:00 p.m.
4	34	September 23, 1962	May 26, 1963	4	29.8 (Note: Tied with The Lucy Show)	15.0	TBA
5	34	September 22, 1963	May 24, 1964	2	36.9	19.0	TBA
6	34	September 20, 1964	May 23, 1965	1	36.3	19.1	TBA
7	33	September 12, 1965	May 15, 1966	1	31.8	17.1	TBA
8	34	September 11, 1966	May 14, 1967	1	29.1	16.0	TBA
9	34	September 17, 1967	July 28, 1968	4	25.5 (Note: Gunsmoke and Family Affair)	14.5	TBA
10	30	September 15, 1968	May 11, 1969	3	26.6	15.5	TBA
11	28	September 14, 1969	April 19, 1970	3	24.8	14.5	TBA
12	28	September 13, 1970	April 11, 1971	9	23.9	14.4	TBA
13	26	September 19, 1971	April 2, 1972	20	21.9	13.6	TBA
14	16	September 12, 1972	January 16, 1973	50	17.0	—N/a	Tuesday 8:00 p.m.

== Episodes ==
=== Season 1 (1959–60) ===
Bonanza, season 1 episodes
No. overall	No. in season	Title	Directed by	Written by	Original release date
1	1	"A Rose for Lotta"	Edward Ludwig	David Dortort	September 12, 1959
2	2	"Death on Sun Mountain"	Paul Landres	Gene L. Coon and David Dortort	September 19, 1959
3	3	"The Newcomers"	Christian Nyby	Thomas Thompson	September 26, 1959
4	4	"The Paiute War"	Paul Landres	Gene L. Coon	October 3, 1959
5	5	"Enter Mark Twain"	Paul Landres	Harold Shumate	October 10, 1959
6	6	"The Julia Bulette Story"	Christian Nyby	Al C. Ward	October 17, 1959
7	7	"The Saga of Annie O'Toole"	Joseph Kane	Thomas Thompson	October 24, 1959
8	8	"The Philip Deidesheimer Story"	Joseph Kane	Thomas Thompson	October 31, 1959
9	9	"Mr. Henry Comstock"	John Brahm	David Dortort	November 7, 1959
10	10	"The Magnificent Adah"	Christian Nyby	Donald S. Sanford	November 14, 1959
11	11	"The Truckee Strip"	Christian Nyby	Herman Groves	November 21, 1959
12	12	"The Hanging Posse"	Christian Nyby	Carey Wilber	November 28, 1959
13	13	"Vendetta"	Joseph Kane	Robert E. Thompson	December 5, 1959
14	14	"The Sisters"	Christian Nyby	Carey Wilber	December 12, 1959
15	15	"The Last Hunt"	Christian Nyby	Donald S. Sanford	December 19, 1959
16	16	"El Toro Grande"	Christian Nyby	John Tucker Battle	January 2, 1960
17	17	"The Outcast"	Lewis Allen	Thomas Thompson	January 9, 1960
18	18	"A House Divided"	Lewis Allen	Al C. Ward	January 16, 1960
19	19	"The Gunmen"	Christian Nyby	Carey Wilber	January 23, 1960
20	20	"The Fear Merchants"	Lewis Allen	Story by : Frank Unger; Teleplay by : Frank Unger and Thomas Thompson	January 30, 1960
21	21	"The Spanish Grant"	Christian Nyby	Story by : Morris Lee Green; Teleplay by : Leonard Heideman and David Dortort	February 6, 1960
22	22	"Blood on the Land"	Felix Feist	Robert E. Thompson	February 13, 1960
23	23	"Desert Justice"	Lewis Allen	Donald S. Sanford	February 20, 1960
24	24	"The Stranger"	Christian Nyby	Story by : Oliver Crawford; Teleplay by : Leonard Heideman	February 27, 1960
25	25	"Escape to Ponderosa"	Charles F. Haas	Story by : Bill Barrett and Malcolm Stuart Boylan; Teleplay by : Robert E. Thompson	March 5, 1960
26	26	"The Avenger"	Christian Nyby	Clair Huffaker	March 19, 1960
27	27	"The Last Trophy"	Lewis Allen	Bill S. Ballinger	March 26, 1960
28	28	"San Francisco"	Arthur Lubin	Thomas Thompson	April 2, 1960
29	29	"Bitter Water"	George Blair	Harold Jack Bloom	April 9, 1960
30	30	"Feet of Clay"	Arthur Lubin	John Furia Jr.	April 16, 1960
31	31	"Dark Star"	Lewis Allen	Anthony Lawrence	April 23, 1960
32	32	"Death at Dawn"	Charles Haas	Laurence E. Mascott	April 30, 1960

=== Season 2 (1960–61) ===
Bonanza, season 2 episodes
No. overall	No. in season	Title	Directed by	Written by	Original release date
33	1	"Showdown"	Lewis Allen	Dean Riesner	September 10, 1960
34	2	"The Mission"	James Neilson	Robert E. Thompson	September 17, 1960
35	3	"Badge Without Honor"	Arthur Lubin	John Twist	September 24, 1960
36	4	"The Mill"	John Rich	Halsted Welles	October 1, 1960
37	5	"The Hopefuls"	James Neilson	E. Jack Neuman	October 8, 1960
38	6	"Denver McKee"	Jacques Tourneur	Fred Freiberger and Steve McNeil	October 15, 1960
39	7	"Day of Reckoning"	Richard H. Bartlett	Story by : Leonard Heideman; Teleplay by : Leonard Heideman and R. Harner Norris	October 22, 1960
40	8	"The Abduction"	Charles Haas	Herman Groves	October 29, 1960
41	9	"Breed of Violence"	Johnny Florea	David Lang	November 5, 1960
42	10	"The Last Viking"	Johnny Florea	Anthony Lawrence	November 12, 1960
43	11	"The Trail Gang"	John Rich	Carey Wilber	November 26, 1960
44	12	"The Savage"	James Neilson	Joseph Stone and Paul King	December 3, 1960
45	13	"Silent Thunder"	Robert Altman	John Furia Jr.	December 10, 1960
46	14	"The Ape"	James P. Yarbrough	Gene L. Coon	December 17, 1960
47	15	"The Blood Line"	Lewis Allen	William Raynor and Myles Wilder	December 31, 1960
48	16	"The Courtship"	James P. Yarbrough	Richard Morgan	January 7, 1961
49	17	"The Spitfire"	William D. Faralla	Ward Hawkins	January 14, 1961
50	18	"The Bride"	Alvin Ganzer	Richard Newman	January 21, 1961
51	19	"Bank Run"	Robert Altman	N.B. Stone Jr.	January 28, 1961
52	20	"The Fugitive"	Lewis Allen	Richard H. Landau	February 4, 1961
53	21	"Vengeance"	Dick Moder	Marion Parsonnet	February 11, 1961
54	22	"Tax Collector"	William Witney	Arnold Belgard	February 18, 1961
55	23	"The Rescue"	William D. Faralla	Steve McNeil	February 25, 1961
56	24	"The Dark Gate"	Robert Gordon	Ward Hawkins	March 4, 1961
57	25	"The Duke"	Robert Altman	Story by : Theodore & Mathilde Ferro; Teleplay by : William R. Cox	March 11, 1961
58	26	"Cutthroat Junction"	Dick Moder	Nat Tanchuck	March 18, 1961
59	27	"The Gift"	William Witney	Denne Bart Petitclerc and Thomas Thompson	April 1, 1961
60	28	"The Rival"	Robert Altman	Anthony Lawrence	April 15, 1961
61	29	"The Infernal Machine"	William Witney	Ward Hawkins	April 22, 1961
62	30	"The Thunderhead Swindle"	Dick Moder	Gene L. Coon	April 29, 1961
63	31	"The Secret"	Robert Altman	John Hawkins	May 6, 1961
64	32	"The Dream Riders"	Robert Altman	James Van Wagoner and Jack McClain	May 20, 1961
65	33	"Elizabeth, My Love"	Lewis Allen	Anthony Lawrence	May 27, 1961
66	34	"Sam Hill"	Robert Altman	David Dortort	June 3, 1961

=== Season 3 (1961–62) ===
Bonanza, season 3 episodes
No. overall	No. in season	Title	Directed by	Written by	Original release date
67	1	"The Smiler"	Thomas Carr	Lewis Reed	September 24, 1961
68	2	"Springtime"	Christian Nyby	John Furia Jr.	October 1, 1961
69	3	"The Honor of Cochise"	Don McDougall	Elliott Arnold	October 8, 1961
70	4	"The Lonely House"	William Witney	Frank Chase	October 15, 1961
71	5	"The Burma Rarity"	William Witney	N.B. Stone Jr.	October 21, 1961
72	6	"Broken Ballad"	Robert Butler	John T. Kelly	October 29, 1961
73	7	"The Many Faces of Gideon Flinch"	Robert Altman	Robert Vincent Wright	November 5, 1961
74	8	"The Friendship"	Don McDougall	Frank Chase	November 12, 1961
75	9	"The Countess"	Robert Sparr	William R. Cox and William D. Powell	November 19, 1961
76	10	"The Horse Breaker"	Don McDougall	Frank Chase	November 26, 1961
77	11	"Day of the Dragon"	Don McDougall	John T. Dugan	December 3, 1961
78	12	"The Frenchman"	Christian Nyby	Norman Lessing	December 10, 1961
79	13	"The Tin Badge"	Lewis Allen	Don Ingalls	December 17, 1961
80	14	"Gabrielle"	Thomas Carr	Anthony Lawrence	December 24, 1961
81	15	"Land Grab"	David Orrick McDearmon	Ward Hawkins	December 31, 1961
82	16	"The Tall Stranger"	Don McDougall	Ward Hawkins	January 7, 1962
83	17	"The Lady from Baltimore"	John Peyser	Elliott Arnold	January 14, 1962
84	18	"The Ride"	Don McDougall	Ward Hawkins	January 21, 1962
85	19	"The Storm"	Lewis Allen	Denne Petitclerc	January 28, 1962
86	20	"The Auld Sod"	William Witney	Charles Lang	February 4, 1962
87	21	"Gift of Water"	Jesse Hibbs	Borden Chase	February 11, 1962
88	22	"The Jackknife"	William Witney	Frank Chase	February 18, 1962
89	23	"The Guilty"	Lewis Allen	Clifford Irving	February 25, 1962
90	24	"The Wooing of Abigail Jones"	Christian Nyby	Norman Lessing	March 4, 1962
91	25	"The Lawmaker"	Christian Nyby	Story by : John A. Johns; Teleplay by : Dick Nelson	March 11, 1962
92	26	"Look to the Stars"	Don McDougall	Robert M. Fresco and Paul Rink	March 18, 1962
93	27	"The Gamble"	William Witney	Story by : Michael Landon; Teleplay by : Frank Cleaver and Michael Landon	April 1, 1962
94	28	"The Crucible"	Paul Nickell	John T. Dugan	April 8, 1962
95	29	"Inger, My Love"	Lewis Allen	Story by : Anthony Lawrence; Teleplay by : Frank Cleaver and David Dortort	April 15, 1962
96	30	"Blessed Are They"	Don McDougall	Story by : Borden Chase; Teleplay by : Borden Chase and Frank Cleaver	April 22, 1962
97	31	"The Dowry"	Christian Nyby	Robert Vincent Wright	April 29, 1962
98	32	"The Long Night"	William Witney	George Stackalee and E. M. Parsons	May 6, 1962
99	33	"The Mountain Girl"	Don McDougall	John Furia	May 13, 1962
100	34	"The Miracle Maker"	Don McDougall	Story by : Lewis Reed; Teleplay by : Frank Cleaver and Preston Wood	May 20, 1962

=== Season 4 (1962–63) ===
Bonanza, season 4 episodes
No. overall	No. in season	Title	Directed by	Written by	Original release date
101	1	"The First Born"	Don McDougall	Judy and George W. George	September 23, 1962
102	2	"The Quest"	Christian Nyby	John Furia^{[A]} and Thomas Thompson	September 30, 1962
103	3	"The Artist"	Don McDougall	Frank Chase	October 7, 1962
104	4	"A Hot Day for a Hanging"	William F. Claxton	Preston Wood and Elliott Arnold	October 14, 1962
105	5	"The Deserter"	William Witney	Norman Lessing	October 21, 1962
106	6	"The Way Station"	Lewis Allen	Frank Cleaver	October 28, 1962
107	7	"The War Comes to Washoe"	Don McDougall	Alvin Sapinsley	November 4, 1962
108	8	"Knight Errant"	William F. Claxton	Joseph Hoffman	November 18, 1962
109	9	"The Beginning"	Christian Nyby	Preston Wood	November 25, 1962
110	10	"The Deadly Ones"	William Witney	Story by : N. B. Stone Jr. Teleplay by : Denne Petitclerc	December 2, 1962
111	11	"Gallagher's Sons"	Christian Nyby	Dick Nelson	December 9, 1962
112	12	"The Decision"	William F. Claxton	Story by : Norman Jacob; Teleplay by : Frank Chase	December 16, 1962
113	13	"The Good Samaritan"	Don McDougall	Robert Bloomfield	December 23, 1962
114	14	"The Jury"	Christian Nyby	Robert Vincent Wright	December 30, 1962
115	15	"The Colonel"	Lewis Allen	Preston Wood	January 6, 1963
116	16	"Song in the Dark"	Don McDougall	Judy and George W. George	January 13, 1963
117	17	"Elegy for a Hangman"	Hollingsworth Morse	Story by : E. M. Parsons; Teleplay by : E. M. Parsons and Shirl Hendryx	January 20, 1963
118	18	"Half a Rogue"	Don McDougall	Arnold Belgard	January 27, 1963
119	19	"The Last Haircut"	William F. Claxton	Charles Lang	February 3, 1963
120	20	"Marie, My Love"	Lewis Allen	Story by : Anne Howard Bailey and Anthony Lawrence; Teleplay by : Anthony Lawrence	February 10, 1963
121	21	"The Hayburner"	William F. Claxton	Alex Sharp	February 17, 1963
122	22	"The Actress"	Christian Nyby	Norman Lessing	February 24, 1963
123	23	"A Stranger Passed This Way"	Lewis Allen	William L. Stuart	March 3, 1963
124	24	"The Way of Aaron"	Murray Golden	Raphael David Blau	March 10, 1963
125	25	"A Woman Lost"	Don McDougall	Frank Chase	March 17, 1963
126	26	"Any Friend of Walter's"	John Florea	Lois Hire	March 24, 1963
127	27	"Mirror of a Man"	Lewis Allen	A. I. Bezzerides	March 31, 1963
128	28	"My Brother's Keeper"	Murray Golden	Seeleg Lester	April 7, 1963
129	29	"Five into the Wind"	William F. Claxton	Meyer Dolinsky	April 21, 1963
130	30	"The Saga of Whizzer McGee"	Don McDougall	Robert L. Welch	April 28, 1963
131	31	"Thunder Man"	Lewis Allen	Lewis Reed	May 5, 1963
132	32	"Rich Man, Poor Man"	John Florea	Story by : Arnold Belgard and Robert Fresco; Teleplay by : Richard P. McDonagh, Barbara and Milton Merlin	May 12, 1963
133	33	"The Boss"	Arthur H. Nadel	Leo Gordon and Paul Leslie Peil	May 19, 1963
134	34	"Little Man... Ten Feet Tall"	Lewis Allen	Story by : Eric Norden and Frank Arno; Teleplay by : Eric Norden	May 26, 1963

=== Season 5 (1963–64) ===
Bonanza, season 5 episodes
No. overall	No. in season	Title	Directed by	Written by	Original release date
135	1	"She Walks in Beauty"	Don McDougall	William L. Stuart	September 22, 1963
136	2	"A Passion for Justice"	Murray Golden	Peter Packer	September 29, 1963
137	3	"Rain from Heaven"	Lewis Allen	Robert Vincent Wright	October 6, 1963
138	4	"Twilight Town"	John Florea	Cy Chermak	October 13, 1963
139	5	"The Toy Soldier"	Tay Garnett	Warren Douglas	October 20, 1963
140	6	"A Question of Strength"	Don McDougall	Frank Cleaver	October 27, 1963
141	7	"Calamity Over the Comstock"	Charles R. Rondeau	Warren Douglas	November 3, 1963
142	8	"Journey Remembered"	Irving J. Moore	Anthony Lawrence	November 10, 1963
143	9	"The Quality of Mercy"	Joseph H. Lewis	Peter Packer	November 17, 1963
144	10	"The Waiting Game"	Richard Sarafian	Ed Adamson	December 8, 1963
145	11	"The Legacy"	Bernard McEveety	Anthony Wilson	December 15, 1963
146	12	"Hoss and the Leprechauns"	John Florea	Robert Barron	December 22, 1963
147	13	"The Prime of Life"	Christian Nyby	Peter Packer	December 29, 1963
148	14	"The Lila Conrad Story"	Tay Garnett	Story by : George Waggner; Teleplay by : Preston Wood	January 5, 1964
149	15	"Ponderosa Matador"	Don McDougall	Alex Sharp	January 12, 1964
150	16	"My Son, My Son"	William F. Claxton	Denne Petitclerc	January 19, 1964
151	17	"Alias Joe Cartwright"	Lewis Allen	Robert Vincent Wright	January 26, 1964
152	18	"The Gentleman from New Orleans"	Don McDougall	William Bruckner	February 2, 1964
153	19	"The Cheating Game"	Joseph Sargent	William L. Stuart	February 9, 1964
154	20	"Bullet for a Bride"	Tay Garnett	Tom Seller	February 16, 1964
155	21	"King of the Mountain"	Don McDougall	Robert Sabaroff	February 23, 1964
156	22	"Love Me Not"	Tay Garnett	Frank Cleaver	March 1, 1964
157	23	"The Pure Truth"	Don McDougall	Lois Hire	March 8, 1964
158	24	"No Less a Man"	Don McDougall	Jerry Adelman	March 15, 1964
159	25	"Return to Honor"	Don McDougall	Jack Turley	March 22, 1964
160	26	"The Saga of Muley Jones"	John Florea	Story by : Alex Sharp and Robert V. Barron; Teleplay by : Robert V. Barron	March 29, 1964
161	27	"The Roper"	John Florea	Peter Packer	April 5, 1964
162	28	"A Pink Cloud Comes from Old Cathay"	Don McDougall	Lewis Clay	April 12, 1964
163	29	"The Companeros"	William F. Claxton	Ken Pettus	April 19, 1964
164	30	"Enter Thomas Bowers"	Murray Golden	Jessica Benson and Murray Golden	April 26, 1964
165	31	"The Dark Past"	Murray Golden	William Bruckner	May 3, 1964
166	32	"The Pressure Game"	Tay Garnett	Don Tait	May 10, 1964
167	33	"Triangle"	Tay Garnett	Frank Cleaver	May 17, 1964
168	34	"Walter and the Outlaws"	Ralph E. Black	Lois Hire	May 24, 1964

=== Season 6 (1964–65) ===
Bonanza, season 6 episodes
No. overall	No. in season	Title	Directed by	Written by	Original release date
169	1	"Invention of a Gunfighter"	John Florea	Daniel B. Ullman	September 20, 1964
170	2	"The Hostage"	Don McDougall	Don Mullally	September 27, 1964
171	3	"The Wild One"	William Witney	Jo Pagano	October 4, 1964
172	4	"Thanks for Everything, Friend"	Christian Nyby	Jerry Adelman	October 11, 1964
173	5	"Logan's Treasure"	Don McDougall	Story by : Robert Sabaroff; Teleplay by : Ken Pettus	October 18, 1964
174	6	"The Scapegoat"	Christian Nyby	Rod Peterson	October 25, 1964
175	7	"A Dime's Worth of Glory"	William F. Claxton	Richard Shapiro and Esther Mayesh	November 1, 1964
176	8	"Square Deal Sam"	Murray Golden	Jessica Benson and Murray Golden	November 8, 1964
177	9	"Between Heaven and Earth"	William Witney	Ed Adamson	November 15, 1964
178	10	"Old Sheba"	John Florea	Alex Sharp	November 22, 1964
179	11	"A Man to Admire"	John Florea	Mort R. Lewis	December 6, 1964
180	12	"The Underdog"	William F. Claxton	Don Mullally	December 13, 1964
181	13	"A Knight to Remember"	Vincent McEveety	Robert V. Barron	December 20, 1964
182	14	"The Saga of Squaw Charlie"	William Witney	Warren Douglas	December 27, 1964
183	15	"The Flapjack Contest"	William F. Claxton	Story by : Tom Davison; Teleplay by : Frank Cleaver	January 3, 1965
184	16	"The Far, Far Better Thing"	Bernard McEveety	Mort R. Lewis	January 10, 1965
185	17	"Woman of Fire"	William F. Claxton	Suzanne Clauser	January 17, 1965
186	18	"The Ballerina"	Don McDougall	Frank Chase	January 24, 1965
187	19	"The Flannel-Mouth Gun"	Don McDougall	Leo Gordon and Paul Leslie Peil	January 31, 1965
188	20	"The Ponderosa Birdman"	Herbert L. Strock	Blair Robertson and Hazel Swanson	February 7, 1965
189	21	"The Search"	William F. Claxton	Frank Cleaver	February 14, 1965
190	22	"The Deadliest Game"	Gerd Oswald	Jo Pagano	February 21, 1965
191	23	"Once a Doctor"	Tay Garnett	Martha Wilkerson	February 28, 1965
192	24	"Right Is the Fourth R"	Virgil Vogel	Jerry Adelman	March 7, 1965
193	25	"Hound Dog"	Ralph E. Black	Alex Sharp	March 21, 1965
194	26	"The Trap"	William Witney	Ken Pettus	March 28, 1965
195	27	"Dead and Gone"	Robert Totten	Paul Schneider	April 4, 1965
196	28	"A Good Night's Rest"	William F. Claxton	Story by : Jeffrey Fleece; Teleplay by : Frank Cleaver	April 11, 1965
197	29	"To Own the World"	Virgil Vogel	Ed Adamson	April 18, 1965
198	30	"Lothario Larkin"	William Witney	Warren Douglas	April 25, 1965
199	31	"The Return"	Virgil Vogel	Story by : Frank Chase & Ken Pettus; Teleplay by : Ken Pettus	May 2, 1965
200	32	"Jonah"	William F. Claxton	Preston Wood	May 9, 1965
201	33	"The Spotlight"	Gerd Oswald	Richard Carr	May 16, 1965
202	34	"Patchwork Man"	Ralph E. Black	Don Tait and William Koenig	May 23, 1965

=== Season 7 (1965–66) ===
Bonanza, season 7 episodes
No. overall	No. in season	Title	Directed by	Written by	Original release date
203	1	"The Debt"	William F. Claxton	William Blinn	September 12, 1965
204	2	"The Dilemma"	William F. Claxton	John Hawkins and Ward Hawkins	September 19, 1965
205	3	"The Brass Box"	William F. Claxton	Paul Schneider	September 26, 1965
206	4	"The Other Son"	William F. Claxton	Thomas Thompson	October 3, 1965
207	5	"The Lonely Runner"	William Witney	Thomas Thompson	October 10, 1965
208	6	"Devil on Her Shoulder"	Virgil W. Vogel	Suzanne Clauser	October 17, 1965
209	7	"Found Child"	Ralph E. Black	Frank Cleaver	October 24, 1965
210	8	"The Meredith Smith"	John Florea	Lois Hire	October 31, 1965
211	9	"Mighty is the Word"	William F. Claxton	Story by : Robert Goodwin; Teleplay by : Thomas Thompson	November 7, 1965
212	10	"The Strange One"	Gerd Oswald	Story by : Stephen Lord; Teleplay by : Jo Pagano and Stephen Lord	November 14, 1965
213	11	"The Reluctant Rebel"	R. G. Springsteen	Wally George	November 21, 1965
214	12	"Five Sundowns to Sunup"	Gerd Oswald	William L. Stuart	December 5, 1965
215	13	"A Natural Wizard"	Robert Totten	Story by : Suzanne Clauser; Teleplay by : William Blinn	December 12, 1965
216	14	"All Ye His Saints"	William F. Claxton	William Blinn	December 19, 1965
217	15	"A Dublin Lad"	William F. Claxton	Mort Thaw	January 2, 1966
218	16	"To Kill a Buffalo"	William F. Claxton	Michael Fisher	January 9, 1966
219	17	"Ride the Wind"	William Witney	Paul Schneider	January 16, 1966
220	18	"Ride the Wind"	William Witney	Paul Schneider	January 23, 1966
221	19	"Destiny's Child"	Gerd Oswald	Robert V. Barron	January 30, 1966
222	20	"Peace Officer"	William Witney	Don Mullally	February 6, 1966
223	21	"The Code"	William F. Claxton	Sidney Ellis	February 13, 1966
224	22	"Three Brides for Hoss"	Ralph E. Black	Jo Pagano	February 20, 1966
225	23	"The Emperor Norton"	William F. Claxton	Story by : Gerry Prince Young and Robert Sabaroff; Teleplay by : Robert Sabaroff	February 27, 1966
226	24	"Her Brother's Keeper"	Virgil W. Vogel	Story by : Lee Pickett; Teleplay by : Mort Thaw	March 6, 1966
227	25	"The Trouble with Jamie"	R. G. Springsteen	Helen B. Hicks	March 20, 1966
228	26	"Shining in Spain"	Maurice Geraghty	Elliott Gilbert	March 27, 1966
229	27	"The Genius"	R. G. Springsteen	Don Mullally	April 3, 1966
230	28	"The Unwritten Commandment"	Gerd Oswald	Story by : Dan Ullman; Teleplay by : Jo Pagano and William Blinn	April 10, 1966
231	29	"Big Shadows on the Land"	William F. Claxton	William F. Leicester and Richard H. Bartlett	April 17, 1966
232	30	"The Fighters"	R. G. Springsteen	Robert Goodwin	April 24, 1966
233	31	"Home from the Sea"	Jean Yarbrough	George F. Slavin and Stanley Adams	May 1, 1966
234	32	"The Last Mission"	R. G. Springsteen	Story by : S. S. Schweitzer; Teleplay by : William Douglas Lansford and S. S. Schweitzer	May 8, 1966
235	33	"A Dollar's Worth of Trouble"	Donald R. Daves	Robert Goodwin	May 15, 1966

=== Season 8 (1966–67) ===
Bonanza, season 8 episodes
No. overall	No. in season	Title	Directed by	Written by	Original release date
236	1	"Something Hurt, Something Wild"	Lewis Allen	Jerry Alderman and William Driskill	September 11, 1966
237	2	"Horse of a Different Hue"	William Witney	William R. Cox	September 18, 1966
238	3	"A Time to Step Down"	Paul Henreid	Frank Chase	September 25, 1966
239	4	"The Pursued"	William Witney	Story by : Thomas Thompson and Marc Michaels; Teleplay by : Thomas Thompson	October 2, 1966
240	5	"The Pursued"	William Witney	Story by : Thomas Thompson and Marc Michaels; Teleplay by : Thomas Thompson	October 9, 1966
241	6	"To Bloom for Thee"	Sutton Roley	June Randolph	October 16, 1966
242	7	"Credit for a Kill"	William F. Claxton	Frederick Louis Fox	October 23, 1966
243	8	"Four Sisters from Boston"	Alan Crosland Jr.	John M. Chester	October 30, 1966
244	9	"Old Charlie"	William F. Claxton	Bob and Wanda Duncan	November 6, 1966
245	10	"Ballad of the Ponderosa"	William F. Claxton	Story by : Hendrik Vollaerts; Teleplay by : Rik Vollaerts and Michael Landon	November 13, 1966
246	11	"The Oath"	Gerd Oswald	Martha Wilkerson	November 20, 1966
247	12	"A Real Nice, Friendly Little Town"	Herman Hoffman	Herman Hoffman	November 27, 1966
248	13	"The Bridegroom"	William F. Claxton	Walter Black	December 4, 1966
249	14	"Tommy"	William Witney	Story by : Mary Terri Taylor and Thomas Thompson; Teleplay by : Mort Thaw and Mary Terri Taylor	December 18, 1966
250	15	"A Christmas Story"	Gerd Oswald	Thomas Thompson	December 25, 1966
251	16	"Ponderosa Explosion"	William F. Claxton	Alex Sharp	January 1, 1967
252	17	"Justice"	Lewis Allen	Richard Wendley	January 8, 1967
253	18	"A Bride for Buford"	William F. Claxton	Robert V. Barron	January 15, 1967
254	19	"Black Friday"	William F. Claxton	Herbert Kastle and John Hawkins	January 22, 1967
255	20	"The Unseen Wound"	Gerd Oswald	Frank Chase	January 29, 1967
256	21	"Journey to Terror"	Lewis Allen	Joel Murcott	February 5, 1967
257	22	"Amigo"	William F. Claxton	Story by : Jack Turley; Teleplay by : John Hawkins and Jack Turley	February 12, 1967
258	23	"A Woman in the House"	Gerd Oswald	Joel Murcott	February 19, 1967
259	24	"Judgement at Red Creek"	William F. Claxton	Robert Sabaroff	February 26, 1967
260	25	"Joe Cartwright, Detective"	William F. Claxton	Story by : Oliver Crawford; Teleplay by : Michael Landon	March 5, 1967
261	26	"Dark Enough to See the Stars"	Donald R. Daves	Kelly Colvin	March 12, 1967
262	27	"The Deed and the Dilemma"	William F. Claxton	William F. Leicester	March 26, 1967
263	28	"The Prince"	William F. Claxton	Story by : Melvin Levy; Teleplay by : John Hawkins	April 2, 1967
264	29	"A Man Without Land"	Donald R. Daves	Steve McNeil	April 9, 1967
265	30	"Napoleon's Children"	Christian Nyby	Judith and Robert Guy Barrows	April 16, 1967
266	31	"The Wormwood Cup"	William F. Claxton	Story by : Joy Dexter; Teleplay by : Joy Dexter and Michael Landon	April 23, 1967
267	32	"Clarissa"	Lewis Allen	Chester Krumholz	April 30, 1967
268	33	"Maestro Hoss"	William F. Claxton	U.S. Anderson	May 7, 1967
269	34	"The Greedy Ones"	Donald R. Daves	James Amesbury	May 14, 1967

=== Season 9 (1967–68) ===
Bonanza, season 9 episodes
No. overall	No. in season	Title	Directed by	Written by	Original release date
270	1	"Second Chance"	Leon Benson	Story by : Paul Schneider; Teleplay by : John Hawkins and Paul Schneider	September 17, 1967
271	2	"Sense of Duty"	William Witney	Story by : Gil Lasky and Abe Polsky; Teleplay by : John Hawkins	September 24, 1967
272	3	"The Conquistadores"	Leon Benson	Walter Black	October 1, 1967
273	4	"Judgement at Olympus"	John Rich	Walter Black	October 8, 1967
274	5	"Night Of Reckoning"	Leon Benson	Walter Black	October 15, 1967
275	6	"False Witness"	Michael Moore	Eric Norden	October 22, 1967
276	7	"The Gentle Ones"	Harry Harris	Frank Chase	October 29, 1967
277	8	"Desperate Passage"	Leon Benson	John Hawkins	November 5, 1967
278	9	"The Sure Thing"	William Witney	Story by : Robert Vincent Wright; Teleplay by : Robert Vincent Wright and Sidney Ellis	November 12, 1967
279	10	"Showdown At Tahoe"	Gerald Mayer	Thomas Thompson	November 19, 1967
280	11	"Six Black Horses"	Donald R. Daves	Story by : William Jerome; Teleplay by : William Jerome and Michael Landon	November 26, 1967
281	12	"Check Rein"	Leon Benson	Story by : Robert I. Holt; Teleplay by : Olney Sherwood and Robert I. Holt	December 3, 1967
282	13	"Justice Deferred"	Gerald Mayer	Jack Miller	December 17, 1967
283	14	"The Gold Detector"	Donald R. Daves	Ward Hawkins	December 24, 1967
284	15	"The Trackers"	Marc Daniels	Story by : Frederick Louis Fox; Teleplay by : Reuben Bercovitch	January 7, 1968
285	16	"A Girl Named George"	Leon Benson	William H. Wright	January 14, 1968
286	17	"The Thirteenth Man"	Leon Benson	Walter Black	January 21, 1968
287	18	"The Burning Sky"	John Rich	Story by : Carol Saraceno; Teleplay by : William H. Wright	January 28, 1968
288	19	"The Price of Salt"	Leon Benson	B. W. Sandefur	February 4, 1968
289	20	"Blood Tie"	Seymour Robbie	Arthur Dales^{[B]}	February 18, 1968
290	21	"The Crime of Johnny Mule"	Leon Benson	Joel Murcott	February 25, 1968
291	22	"The Late Ben Cartwright"	Leon Benson	Walter Black	March 3, 1968
292	23	"Star Crossed"	William F. Claxton	Thomas Thompson	March 10, 1968
293	24	"Trouble Town"	Leon Benson	David Lang	March 17, 1968
294	25	"Commitment at Angelus"	Leon Benson	Peter Germano	April 7, 1968
295	26	"A Dream to Dream"	William F. Claxton	Michael Landon	April 14, 1968
296	27	"In Defense of Honor"	Marc Daniels	Story by : Richard Wendley and William Douglas Lansford; Teleplay by : William Douglas Lansford	April 28, 1968
297	28	"To Die in Darkness"	Michael Landon	Michael Landon	May 5, 1968
298	29	"The Bottle Fighter"	Leon Benson	Story by : Colin MacKenzie and S. H. Barnett; Teleplay by : John Hawkins	May 12, 1968
299	30	"The Arrival of Eddie"	Marc Daniels	John M. Chester and Ward Hawkins	May 19, 1968
300	31	"The Stronghold"	Leon Benson	John Hawkins and William Riley Burnett	May 26, 1968
301	32	"Pride of a Man"	William F. Claxton	Ward Hawkins and Helen B. Hicks	June 2, 1968
302	33	"A Severe Case of Matrimony"	Lewis Allen	Michael Fessier	July 7, 1968
303	34	"Stage Door Johnnies"	William F. Claxton	Alex Sharp	July 28, 1968

=== Season 10 (1968–69) ===
Bonanza, season 10 episodes
No. overall	No. in season	Title	Directed by	Written by	Original release date
304	1	"Different Pines, Same Wind"	Leon Benson	Suzanne Clauser	September 15, 1968
305	2	"Child"	Leon Benson	Jack B. Sowards	September 22, 1968
306	3	"Salute to Yesterday"	Leon Benson	John Hawkins	September 29, 1968
307	4	"The Real People of Muddy Creek"	Leon Benson	Alf Harris	October 6, 1968
308	5	"The Passing of a King"	Leon Benson	B. W. Sandefur	October 13, 1968
309	6	"The Last Vote"	Joseph Pevney	Robert Vincent Wright	October 20, 1968
310	7	"Catch as Catch Can"	Robert L. Friend	David Lang	October 27, 1968
311	8	"Little Girl Lost"	Don Richardson	Michael Fessier	November 3, 1968
312	9	"The Survivors"	Leon Benson	John Hawkins, Colin MacKenzie, S. H. Barnett	November 10, 1968
313	10	"The Sound of Drums"	Robert L. Friend	William F. Leicester	November 17, 1968
314	11	"Queen High"	Leon Benson	Michael Fessier	December 1, 1968
315	12	"Yonder Man"	Leo Penn	Milton S. Gelman	December 8, 1968
316	13	"Mark of Guilt"	Leon Benson	Ward Hawkins, Frank Telford	December 15, 1968
317	14	"A World Full of Cannibals"	Gunnar Hellström	Preston Wood	December 22, 1968
318	15	"Sweet Annie Laurie"	Don Richardson	Jackson Gillis, John Hawkins, Jess Carneol, Kay Lenard	January 5, 1969
319	16	"My Friend, My Enemy"	Leon Benson	Stanley Roberts, Jack B. Sowards	January 12, 1969
320	17	"Mrs. Wharton and the Lesser Breeds"	Leon Benson	Preston Wood	January 19, 1969
321	18	"Erin"	Don Richardson	Sandy Summerhayes	January 26, 1969
322	19	"Company of Forgotten Men"	Leon Benson	Jess Carneol, Kay Lenard	February 2, 1969
323	20	"The Clarion"	Lewis Allen	John Hawkins, Frank Chase	February 9, 1969
324	21	"The Lady and the Mountain Lion"	Joseph Pevney	Larry Markes	February 23, 1969
325	22	"Five Candles"	Lewis Allen	Ken Trevey	March 2, 1969
326	23	"The Wish"	Michael Landon	Michael Landon	March 9, 1969
327	24	"The Deserter"	Leon Benson	B. W. Sandefur, John Dunkel	March 16, 1969
328	25	"Emily"	Leon Benson	Elliot Gilbert, Preston Wood	March 23, 1969
329	26	"The Running Man"	Leon Benson	Ward Hawkins	March 30, 1969
330	27	"The Unwanted"	Herschel Daugherty	Thomas Thompson, Suzanne Clauser	April 6, 1969
331	28	"Speak No Evil"	Leon Benson	Norman Katkov, B. W. Sandefur	April 20, 1969
332	29	"The Fence"	Lewis Allen	Ward Hawkins, Milton S. Gelman	April 27, 1969
333	30	"A Ride in the Sun"	Leon Benson	John Hawkins, Peter Germano	May 11, 1969

=== Season 11 (1969–70) ===
Bonanza, season 11 episodes
No. overall	No. in season	Title	Directed by	Written by	Original release date
334	1	"Another Windmill to Go"	James B. Clark	Story by : Palmer Thompson; Teleplay by : Palmer Thompson	September 14, 1969
335	2	"The Witness"	Don Richardson	Joel Murcott	September 21, 1969
336	3	"The Silence at Stillwater"	Joseph Lejtes	Preston Wood	September 28, 1969
337	4	"A Lawman's Lot is Not a Happy One"	Don Richardson	Vincent Wright	October 5, 1969
338	5	"Anatomy of a Lynching"	William Wiard	Preston Wood	October 12, 1969
339	6	"To Stop a War"	Leon Benson	Carey Wilber	October 19, 1969
340	7	"The Medal"	Lewis Allen	Frank Chase	October 26, 1969
341	8	"The Stalker"	Robert L. Friend	D. C. Fontana	November 2, 1969
342	9	"Meena"	Herschel Daugherty	Jack B. Sowards	November 16, 1969
342	10	"A Darker Shadow"	Don Richardson	John Hawkins, Jonathon Knopf	November 23, 1969
343	11	"Dead Wrong"	Michael Landon	Michael Landon	December 7, 1969
345	12	"Old Friends"	Leon Benson	Barney Slater	December 14, 1969
346	13	"Abner Willoughby's Return"	Herschel Daugherty	Jack B. Sowards	December 21, 1969
347	14	"It's a Small World"	Michael Landon	Michael Landon	January 4, 1970
348	15	"Danger Road"	William F. Claxton	Milton S. Gelman	January 11, 1970
349	16	"The Big Jackpot"	Herschel Daugherty	John Hawkins	January 18, 1970
350	17	"The Trouble with Amy"	Leon Benson	Jack Miller, John Hawkins	January 25, 1970
351	18	"The Lady and the Mark"	Leon Benson	Preston Wood	February 1, 1970
352	19	"Is There Any Man Here"	Don Richardson	B. W. Sandefur	February 8, 1970
353	20	"The Law and Billy Burgess"	William F. Claxton	Stanley Roberts	February 15, 1970
354	21	"Long Way to Ogden"	Lewis Allen	Joel Murcott	February 22, 1970
355	22	"Return Engagement"	Don Richardson	Stanley Roberts	March 1, 1970
356	23	"The Gold Mine"	Leon Benson	Preston Wood, Robert Bruckner	March 8, 1970
357	24	"Decision at Los Robles"	Michael Landon	Michael Landon	March 22, 1970
358	25	"Caution, Easter Bunny Crossing"	Bruce Bilson	Larry Markes	March 29, 1970
359	26	"The Horse Traders"	Herschel Daugherty	Jack B. Sowards	April 5, 1970
360	27	"What are Pardners For?"	William F. Claxton	Jack B. Sowards	April 12, 1970
361	28	"A Matter of Circumstance"	William F. Claxton	B. W. Sandefur	April 19, 1970

=== Season 12 (1970–71) ===
Bonanza, season 12 episodes
No. overall	No. in season	Title	Directed by	Written by	Original release date
362	1	"The Night Virginia City Died"	William Wiard	John Hawkins	September 13, 1970
363	2	"A Matter of Faith"	William Wiard	Jack B. Sowards, John Hawkins	September 20, 1970
364	3	"The Weary Willies"	Leo Penn	Robert Pirosh	September 27, 1970
365	4	"The Wagon"	James Neilson	Ken Pettus	October 4, 1970
366	5	"The Power of Life and Death"	Leo Penn	Joel Murcott	October 11, 1970
367	6	"Gideon, the Good"	Herschel Daugherty	Ken Pettus	October 18, 1970
368	7	"The Trouble with Trouble"	Herschel Daugherty	Jack B. Sowards	October 25, 1970
369	8	"Thornton's Account"	William F. Claxton	Preston Wood	November 1, 1970
370	9	"The Love Child"	Michael Landon	Michael Landon	November 8, 1970
371	10	"El Jefe"	William F. Claxton	Ken Pettus	November 15, 1970
372	11	"The Luck of Pepper Shannon"	Nicholas Webster	John Hawkins	November 22, 1970
373	12	"The Impostors"	Lewis Allen	Robert Vincent Wright	December 13, 1970
374	13	"Honest John"	Lewis Allen	Arthur Heinemann	December 20, 1970
375	14	"For a Young Lady"	Don Richardson	B. W. Sandefur	December 27, 1970
376	15	"A Single Pilgrim"	William Wiard	Arthur Weingarten, Suzanne Clauser	January 3, 1971
377	16	"The Gold-Plated Rifle"	Joseph Pevney	Preston Wood	January 10, 1971
378	17	"Top Hand"	William F. Claxton	Arthur Heinemann, John Hawkins	January 17, 1971
379	18	"A Deck of Aces"	Lewis Allen	Stanley Roberts	January 31, 1971
380	19	"The Desperado"	Philip Leacock	George Lovell Hayes	February 7, 1971
381	20	"The Reluctant American"	Philip Leacock	Stanley Roberts	February 14, 1971
382	21	"Shadow of a Hero"	Leo Penn	John Hawkins, Mel Goldberg	February 21, 1971
383	22	"The Silent Killer"	Leo Penn	John Hawkins	February 28, 1971
384	23	"Terror at 2:00"	Michael Landon	Michael Landon	March 7, 1971
385	24	"The Stillness Within"	Michael Landon	Suzanne Clauser	March 14, 1971
386	25	"A Time to Die"	Philip Leacock	Don Ingalls	March 21, 1971
387	26	"Winter Kill"	William Wiard	Story by : Jack Rummler; Teleplay by : John Hawkins and Robert Pirosh	March 28, 1971
388	27	"Kingdom of Fear"	Joseph Pevney	Michael Landon	April 4, 1971
389	28	"An Earthquake Called Callahan"	Herschel Daugherty	Preston Wood	April 11, 1971

=== Season 13 (1971–72) ===
Bonanza, season 13 episodes
No. overall	No. in season	Title	Directed by	Written by	Original release date
390	1	"The Grand Swing"	William F. Claxton	John Hawkins, Ward Hawkins	September 19, 1971
391	2	"Fallen Woman"	Lewis Allen	Ward Hawkins	September 26, 1971
392	3	"Bushwhacked"	William Wiard	Preston Wood	October 3, 1971
393	4	"Rock-a-Bye, Hoss"	Herschel Daugherty	Preston Wood, Robert Vincent Wright	October 10, 1971
394	5	"The Prisoners"	William F. Claxton	Arthur Heinemann	October 17, 1971
395	6	"Cassie"	Herschel Daugherty	True Boardman	October 24, 1971
396	7	"Don't Cry, My Son"	Michael Landon	Michael Landon	October 31, 1971
397	8	"Face Of Fear"	Chris Christenberry	Ken Pettus	November 14, 1971
398	9	"Blind Hunch"	Lewis Allen	John Hawkins, Robert Pirosh	November 21, 1971
399	10	"The Iron Butterfly"	Leo Penn	Harold Swanton	November 28, 1971
400	11	"The Rattlesnake Brigade"	William Wiard	Gordon T Dawson	December 5, 1971
401	12	"Easy Come, Easy Go"	Joseph Pevney	Jack B. Sowards	December 12, 1971
402	13	"A Home for Jamie"	Leo Penn	Jean Holloway	December 19, 1971
403	14	"Warbonnet"	Arthur H. Nadel	Arthur Heinemann	December 26, 1971
404	15	"The Lonely Man"	William F. Claxton	John Hawkins	January 2, 1972
405	16	"Second Sight"	Lewis Allen	Arthur Weingarten, Suzanne Clauser	January 9, 1972
406	17	"The Saddle Stiff"	William F. Claxton	Samuel A. Peeples, John Hawkins	January 16, 1972
407	18	"Frenzy"	Lewis Allen	Preston Wood, Karl Tunberg	January 30, 1972
408	19	"Customs of the Country"	Joseph Pevney	Joseph Bonaduce	February 6, 1972
409	20	"Shanklin"	Leo Penn	William Kelley	February 13, 1972
410	21	"Search in Limbo"	Leo Penn	Don Ingalls	February 20, 1972
411	22	"He Was Only Seven"	Michael Landon	Michael Landon	March 5, 1972
412	23	"The Younger Brothers' Younger Brother"	Michael Landon	Michael Landon	March 12, 1972
413	24	"A Place to Hide"	Herschel Daugherty	William D. Gordon, Ward Hawkins	March 19, 1972
414	25	"A Visit to Upright"	William Wiard	Joseph Bonaduce	March 26, 1972
415	26	"One Ace Too Many"	Lewis Allen	Stanley Roberts	April 2, 1972

=== Season 14 (1972–73) ===
Bonanza, season 14 episodes
No. overall	No. in season	Title	Directed by	Written by	Original release date
416	1	"Forever"	Michael Landon	Michael Landon	September 12, 1972
417	2	"Forever"	Michael Landon	Michael Landon	September 19, 1972
418	3	"Heritage of Anger"	Nicholas Webster	Don Ingalls	September 26, 1972
419	4	"The Initiation"	Alf Kjellin	Douglas Day Stewart	October 3, 1972
420	5	"Riot!"	Lewis Allen	Robert Pirosh	October 10, 1972
421	6	"New Man"	Leo Penn	Jack B. Sowards	October 17, 1972
422	7	"Ambush at Rio Lobo"	Nicholas Colasanto	Joel Murcott	October 24, 1972
423	8	"The 26th Grave"	Nicholas Colasanto	Stanley Roberts	October 31, 1972
424	9	"Stallion"	E. W. Swackhamer	Jack B. Sowards	November 14, 1972
425	10	"The Hidden Enemy"	Alf Kjellin	Stanley Roberts	November 28, 1972
426	11	"The Sound of Sadness"	Michael Landon	Michael Landon	December 5, 1972
427	12	"The Bucket Dog"	William F. Claxton	John Hawkins	December 19, 1972
428	13	"First Love"	Leo Penn	Richard Collins	December 26, 1972
429	14	"The Witness"	Lewis Allen	Story by : Arthur Heinemann; Teleplay by : Joel Murcott and Arthur Heinemann	January 2, 1973
430	15	"The Marriage of Theodora Duffy"	William F. Claxton	Ward Hawkins	January 9, 1973
431	16	"The Hunter"	Michael Landon	Michael Landon	January 16, 1973

== TV movies ==
Bonanza television movies
Title	Directed by	Written by	Original release date
Bonanza: The Next Generation	William F. Claxton	Paul Savage	March 3, 1988
This is the continuing saga of the Cartwrights, only none of the original Cartwrights are here anymore but their sons appear. Ben and Hoss have died, Little Joe is MIA; he joined up with Teddy Roosevelt and is currently missing and Adam has emigrated to Australia. Ben's brother, Aaron (John Ireland) is now in charge of the Ponderosa, and Little Joe's wife, Annie also lives there. His son, Benjamin (Michael Landon Jr.) has come back from the East. Charlie Poke is a man who owes his life to Ben Cartwright. He is now the ranch foreman and is not exactly on good terms with Aaron. Aaron has allowed a mining company access to the Ponderosa, but the man in charge has other ideas. Hoss' son, Josh (Dirk Blocker), whom no one has seen before, has come to the Ponderosa to kill Hoss because he thinks Hoss deserted him and his mother - not knowing that Hoss died before he could go back to bring Josh's mother to the Ponderosa.
Bonanza: The Return	Jerry Jameson	Michael Landon Jr.	November 28, 1993
A man with a grudge against the late Little Joe seeks revenge on the Cartwrights and attempts to take over the Ponderosa, A.C. thinks about writing a letter to his father.
Bonanza: Under Attack	Mark Tinker	Denne Bart Petitclerc	January 15, 1995
A reimagining of the next generation of Cartwrights, three cousins Benji, A.C., and Josh join together to fight off forces to save the Ponderosa. Under the guidance of old friend Bronc Evans, they learn the meaning of family.

== Ponderosa prequel series ==
No.	Title	Directed by	Written by	Original release date
1	"Pilot"	Simon Wincer	Beth Sullivan	September 9, 2001
2	"Pilot"	Simon Wincer	Beth Sullivan	September 9, 2001
3	"Joaquin"	Mark Piper	Kathyrn Ford	September 16, 2001
4	"Bare Knuckles"	Kevin James Dobson	Joe Viola	September 23, 2001
5	"The Promise"	Kevin James Dobson	Robert Hamilton	September 30, 2001
6	"Homeland"	Kevin James Dobson	Jeanne C. Davis	October 14, 2001
7	"Quarantine"	Kevin James Dobson	Joe Viola	October 28, 2001
8	"Secrets and Lies"	Chris Langman	Kathryn Ford	November 4, 2001
9	"The Legend of John Riley"	Kevin James Dobson	Rick Najera	November 18, 2001
10	"Brother Against Brother"	Lewis Fitz-Gerald	Jennifer Tait	December 2, 2001
11	"Where the Heart Is"	Paul Faint	Jeanne C. Davis	December 16, 2001
12	"Treasure"	Kevin James Dobson	Jennifer Tait	January 6, 2002
13	"Spoils of War"	Declan Eames	Kathryn Ford	January 13, 2002
14	"A Time to Win"	Declan Eames	Beth Sullivan	January 20, 2002
15	"Blind Faith"	Chris Thomson	Ron Green	February 10, 2002
16	"Lesser of Two Evils"	Declan Eames	Joe Viola	February 17, 2002
17	"Comes a Horse"	Unknown	Unknown	March 24, 2002
18	"Grown Ups"	Unknown	Unknown	April 28, 2002
19	"Samson and Hercules"	Unknown	Unknown	May 5, 2002
20	"Fugitive"	Unknown	Unknown	May 12, 2002

== See also ==
- Bonanza accolades
