= Davis Creek Regional Park =

Regional park in Washoe County, Nevada

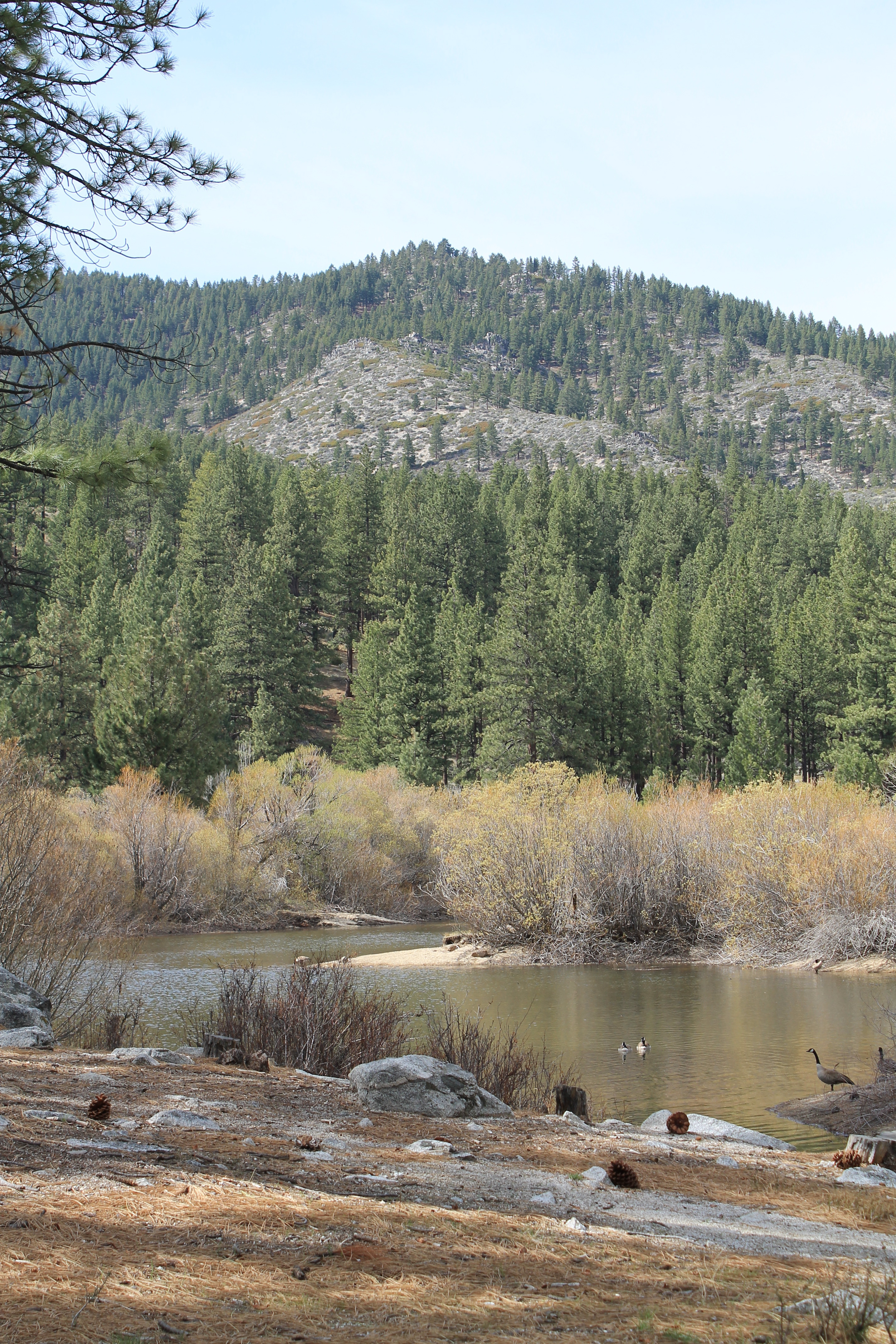
- Davis Creek Regional Park on April 6, 2013
- Interactive map of Davis Creek Regional Park
- Type: Regional park
- Location: Washoe Valley, Nevada, US
- Nearest city: Carson City, Nevada
- Coordinates: 39°18′18″N 119°49′57″W
- Area: 265 acres (107 ha; 0.414 sq mi)
- Elevation: 5,100 ft (1,600 m) (parking lot)
- Opened: 1968
- Website: www.washoecounty.gov/parks/parks/park_directory_pages/south_region/davis_creek_park.php

Davis Creek Regional Park is a 265-acre (107 ha; 0.414 sq mi) regional park in Washoe Valley, Nevada, United States, east of the Sierra Nevada. The park opened to visitors in 1968 and was severely damaged by the Davis Fire in September 2024.

== Geography ==
Davis Creek Regional Park is 265 acres (107 ha). The parking lot lies at an elevation of 5,100 feet (1,600 m) above sea level and the Ophir Creek Trail peaks at 6,252 feet (1,906 m). The park lies on the east slope of the Sierra Nevada in a stand of Jeffrey pine.

== History ==
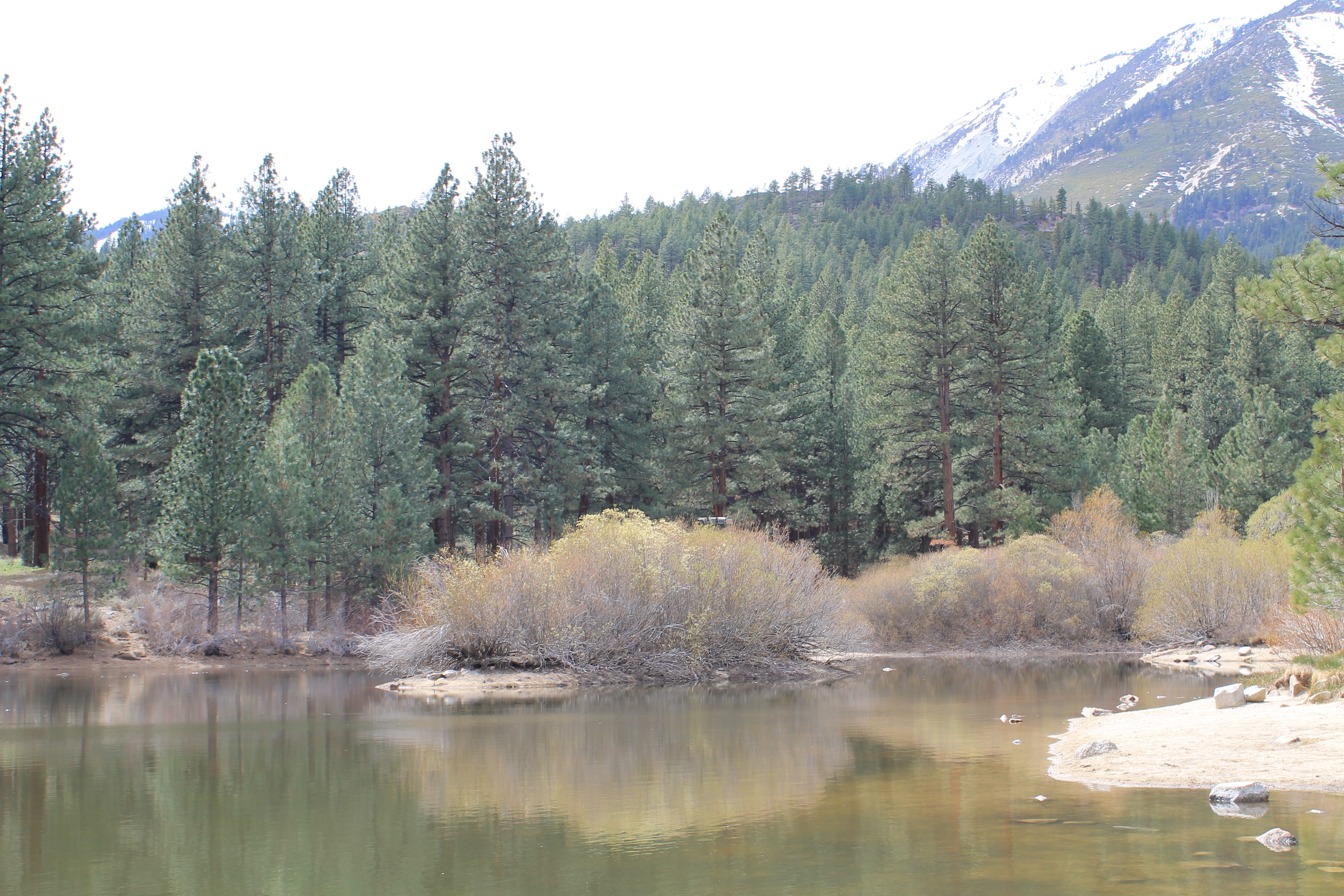
Davis Creek Pond on April 6, 2013

In the late 1800s, timber in the area was cut. Ice from Davis Creek Pond was used in Virginia City mines. The land of Davis Creek Regional Park belonged to Winters Ranch, known for its Thoroughbred horses, with the park entrance located near a former horse race track. The park also lay within Theodore Winters' Rancho del Sierra. His landholdings in Nevada and California eventually totaled 18,000 acres (7,300 ha). Ultimately, the park publicly opened to visitors in 1968. On May 30, 1983, an avalanche occurred on nearby Slide Mountain and a subsequent flood followed, which killed one person and injured six and damaged or destroyed five residential structures near the park. The Nevada Department of Wildlife first stocked Davis Creek Pond with largemouth bass in the early 1980s. Continuous stocking has been occurring since 1991.

On September 7, 2024, the Davis Fire started from a prohibited and improperly extinguished campfire in the day use area. Officials closed the park for 2025. The fire burned 118 acres (48 ha) in Davis Creek Regional Park. Costs of the fire in the park are expected to exceed $2 million for repairs to a ranger residence, five outbuildings, the amphitheater, a utility trailer, electrical infrastructure, and miscellaneous equipment. Several restoration and rehabilitation efforts have occurred since, including native plant reseeding, dead tree clearance, and tree planting. Davis Creek Campground and Discovery Trail remain closed.

== Ecology ==
The park has over 100 species of birds at certain times of the year. There are dozens of herbaceous plant species, several mammal, amphibian, reptile, arthropod, and tree species.

== Activities ==
Davis Creek Regional Park has three maintained trails: Natural Trail around Davis Creek Pond, Discovery Trail around the park, and Ophir Creek Trail that treads up Slide Mountain and ends in Tahoe Meadows. Discovery Trail is currently closed due to the Davis Fire. Ophir Creek Trail is available to equestrians.

The park has picnic areas and fishing is allowed in Davis Creek Pond. The campground has 62 slots.

== In popular culture ==
Bonanza: Under Attack was partially filmed at the park. PBS Reno filmed season seven, episode six of "Wild Nevada", featuring the park and the Davis Fire.

== See also ==
- Galena Creek Regional Park
- Washoe Lake State Park
