= Galena Creek Regional Park =

Regional park in Washoe County, Nevada

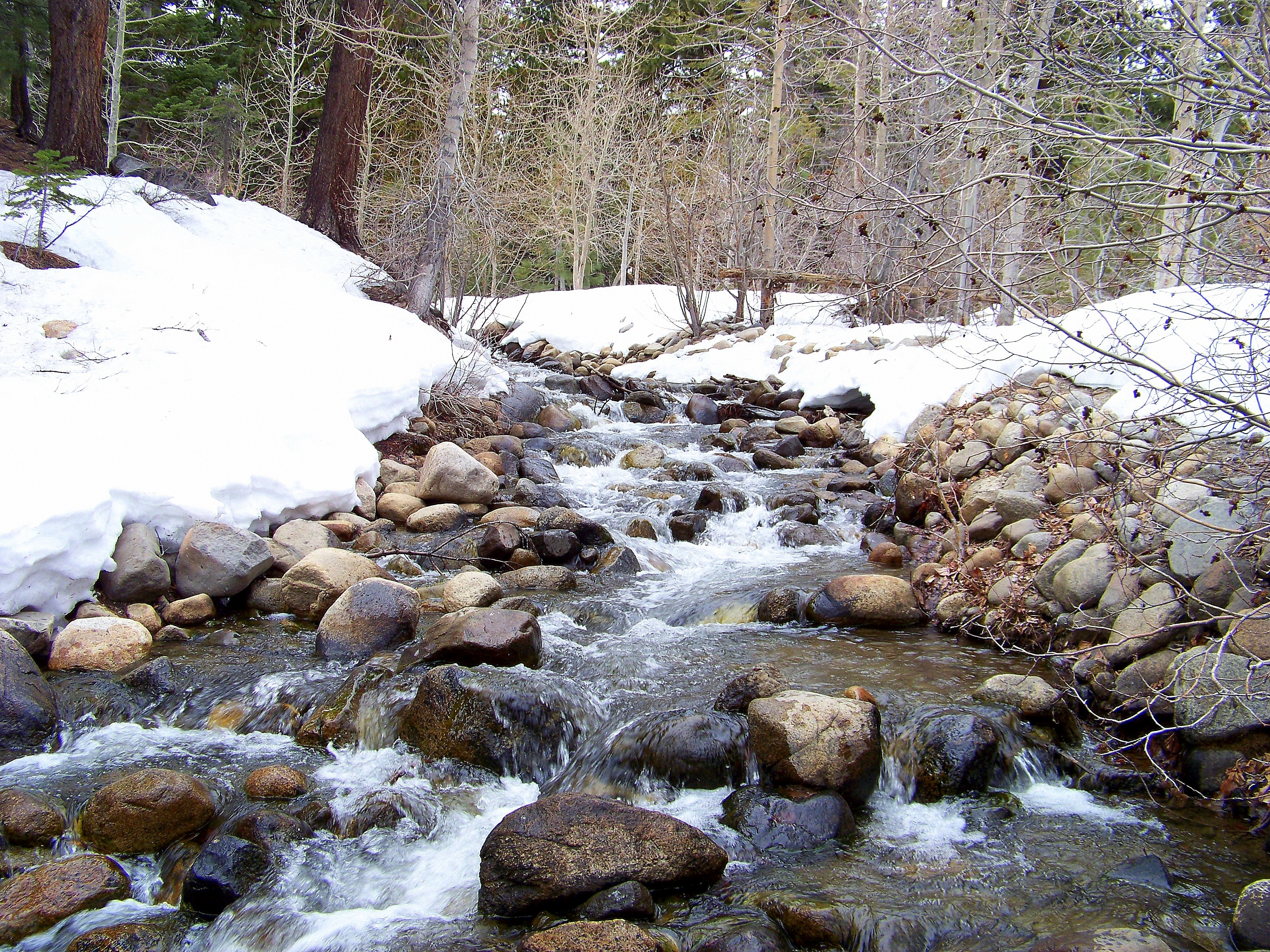
- View of Galena Creek
- Interactive map of Galena Creek Regional Park
- Location: Eastern slope of the Sierra Nevada, off Nevada State Route 431
- Nearest city: Carson City, Nevada, US
- Coordinates: 39°21′14″N 119°51′27″W
- Average elevation: 6,633 ft (2,022 m)
- Max. elevation: 8,047 ft (2,453 m)
- Min. elevation: 5,862 ft (1,787 m)
- Created: 1931
- Visitors: 150,000 (in 2006)
- Governing body: Washoe County
- Website: www.washoecounty.gov/parks/parks/park_directory_pages/south_region/galena_creek_regional_park.php

Galena Creek Regional Park is a regional park in Washoe County, Nevada, United States. It lies on the eastern slopes of the Sierra Nevada and is accessed through Nevada State Route 431, also known as Mount Rose Highway. The land was purchased by Washoe County in 1931, making it the oldest park administered by the county.

== Geography ==
The park lies at an average elevation of 6,633 feet (2,022 m) above sea level, with the lowest point at 5,862 feet (1,787 m) and the highest at 8,047 feet (2,453 m).

Three creeks flow year–round: Galena, Whites, and Thomas creeks.

The north and south entrances are accessible via Mount Rose Highway, with the northern and southern portions of the park divided by Galena Creek.

== History ==
In 1860, R.S. and Andrew Hatch purchased the area near Galena Creek Regional Park as a gold prospecting property. There were minimal gold deposits, however it had a high concentration of galena, a mineral with a high concentration of lead sulfide. Silver loads in the Comstock Lode positively impacted Virginia City, creating demand for stamp mills and smelters in what was known as Galena. Sawmills were powered by Galena Creek. In 1864, a harsh winter halted transport of goods in and out of Virginia City. Two destructive fires occurred, one in 1865 and another in 1867, which leveled parts of the town. Settlers moved out of the area to find other work in the Sierra Nevada.

Washoe County purchased the land for $10 per acre in 1931. The county also operated Galena Creek Fish Hatchery between 1931 and 1949 because Galena Creek had a constant flow of unpolluted water. The hatchery was closed from damage sustained after a flood. It is marked by Nevada State Historical Marker number 267.

During the 1960 Winter Olympics held in Squaw Valley, California, a training ski jump in the park was run in the park by the University of Nevada, Reno ski team. It also functioned as a backup jump for the Olympics. Camp We Ch Me Lodge was built in 1980 for Camp Fire Girls of America. It has since been renovated and now operates as a community building. Galena Creek Fish Hatchery was acquired again in 1994 by Washoe County and was renovated for community use. Marilyn's Pond opened in 2003 after expansion. In September 2024, the park was temporarily closed during the Davis Fire.

== Ecology ==
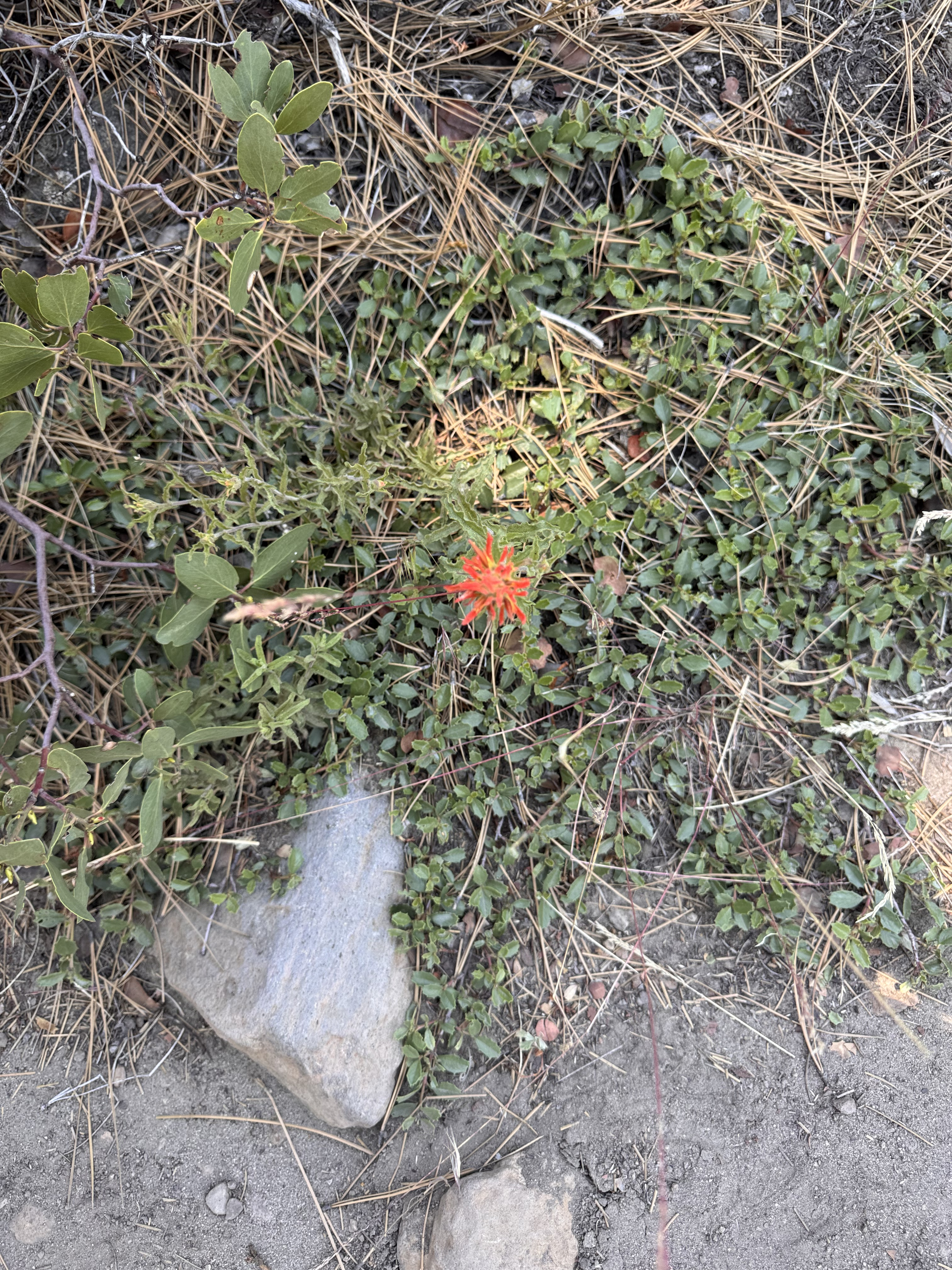
Silene laciniata on Jones–Whites Creek Loop Trail

The park has several plant and animal species, including Sarcodes sanguinea. Marilyn's Pond is stocked with rainbow trout every spring by the Nevada Department of Wildlife. Galena Creek, Whites Creek, and Thomas Creek have rainbow trout and eastern brook trout. Brook trout were stocked in the 1950s and 1970s and rainbow trout is stocked every spring.

== Recreation ==
There are several trails in Galena Creek Regional Park. There are also picnic areas. Fishing is permitted at Marilyn's Pond, which is one acre (0.40 ha) and 10 feet (3.0 m) deep. Fly fishing is permitted in Galena Creek. Galena Creek Fish Hatchery can be rented for private events.

== See also ==
- Carson Range
- Davis Creek Regional Park
- Galena Creek Bridge
