= Davis Fire =

2024 wildfire in Nevada, US

- Part of the 2024 Nevada wildfires
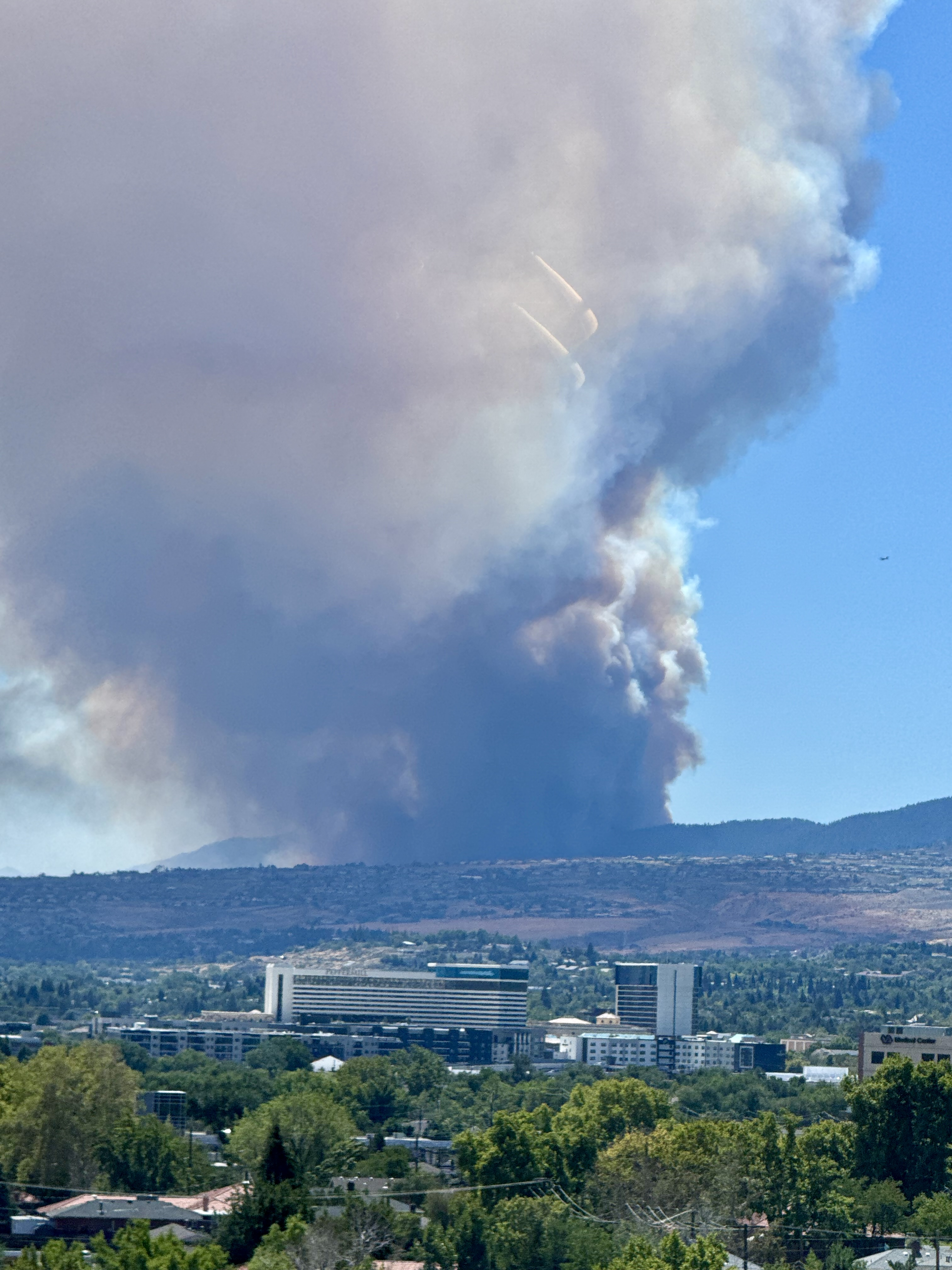
- Smoke from the Davis Fire on September 8
- Date: September 7 –; September 25, 2024; (18 days)
- Location: Washoe County, Nevada, 20 miles south of Reno

Statistics
- Burned area: 5,824 acres (2,357 ha)
- Land use: Private, state, and federal land

Impacts
- Deaths: 0
- Injuries: 1 firefighter
- Evacuated: 20,000
- Structures destroyed: 16 primary, 22 outbuildings
- Cost: $12.6 million (suppression efforts) $2 million (park restoration efforts)

Ignition
- Cause: Improperly extinguished campfire
- Motive: Accidental

Map
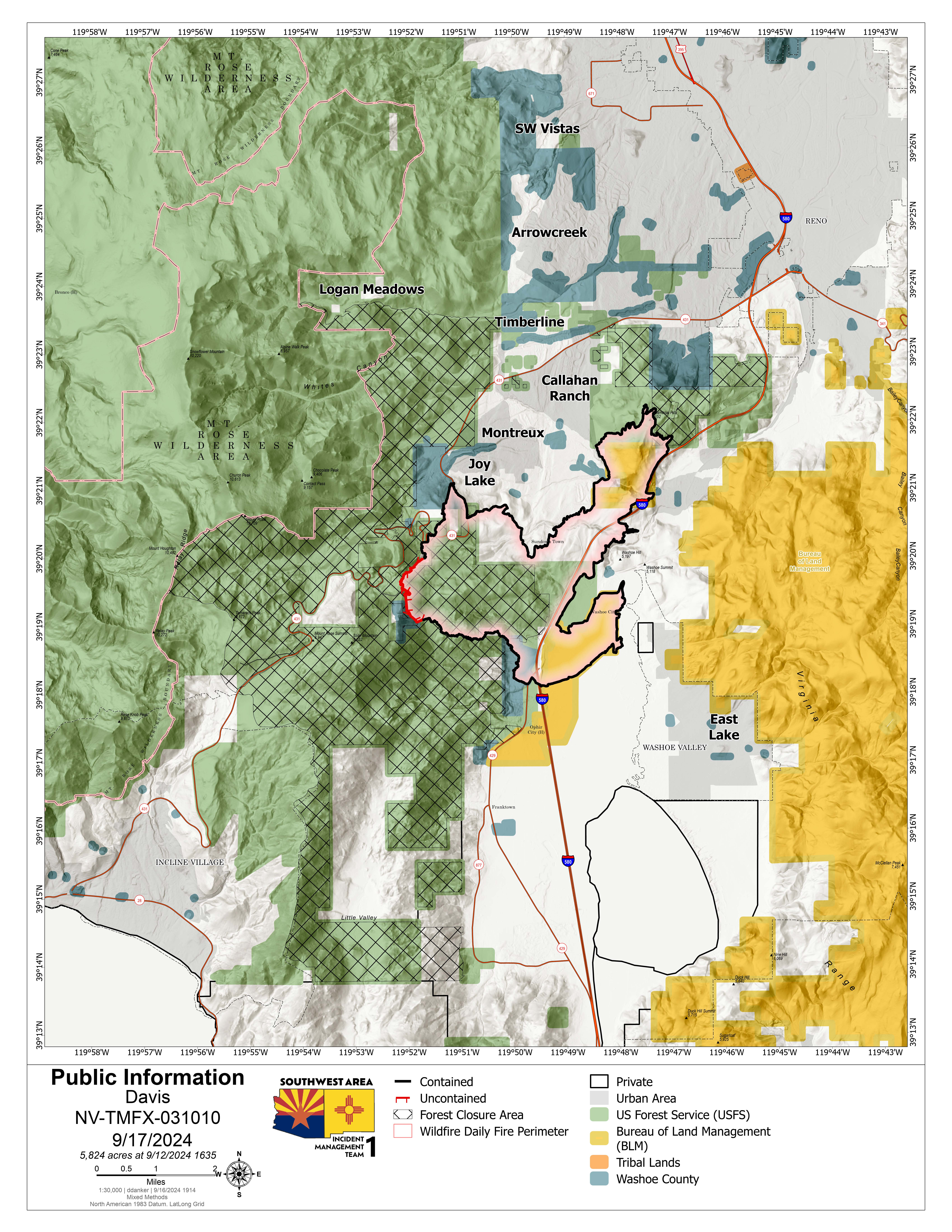
- Map of the Davis Fire on September 17

The Davis Fire was a destructive, fast-moving wildfire that burned in Washoe Valley, Nevada from September 7 – September 25, 2024. The fire ignited in Davis Creek Regional Park due to an improperly extinguished campfire around 2:30 pm on September 7. At a final size of 5,824 acres (2,357 ha), the fire destroyed sixteen primary structures and twenty–two outbuildings, injured one firefighter, and prompted evacuations for roughly 20,000 people.

The fire rapidly grew to 1,500 acres (610 ha) the night it started, prompting evacuations in Washoe Valley and south Reno and closing several roads. By the next morning, it was estimated at 6,500 acres (2,600 ha) and Nevada governor Joe Lombardo declared a state of emergency. The fire size was revised to 4,703 acres (1,903 ha). A red flag warning was issued on September 10 as the fire grew to roughly 5,600 acres (2,300 ha). A particularly dangerous situation was issued by the National Weather Service Reno on September 11 due to strong winds that were forcast to gust up to 75 miles per hour (121 km/h) from a cold front, with projections showing the fire spreading between 3–7 miles (4.8–11.3 km) north. However, crews were able to control spread of the fire west of State Route 431 and evacuations were reduced on September 12, but the fire had grown to 5,824 acres (2,357 ha). The fire received moisture due to the cold front in the following days. A burned area emergency response team began burn severity on September 17, and the Davis Fire reached 100% containment on September 25, 2024.

At its peak, the Davis Fire threatened 36,000 structures. Among the destroyed structures was the Holy Spirit Catholic Mission, the only church that held a Latin mass in Northern Nevada. Suppression efforts cost roughly $12.6 million, and the cost of restoring Davis Creek Regional Park is estimated to be at least $2 million. One firefighter received an eye injury. One bear who received extensive burns was euthanized by the Nevada Department of Wildlife.

== Background ==
The Davis Fire started in the Washoe Valley, which is prone to wind. Washoe Valley is prone to strong winds because of its geography that functions as a funnel for wind. Wind is naturally strong at higher altitudes, particularly near the jet stream. The jet stream sometimes reaches the ridgelines of the surrounding mountains, creating strong winds. The Washoe Zephyr impacted the spread of the Davis Fire. It is a routine, local wind that occurs in the Truckee Meadows. In the afternoon and evening, warm air rises from the ground, traveling west as it cools and sinks near the Sierra Nevada. This subsequently lowers atmospheric pressure in the Truckee Meadows. This sinking motion creates high atmospheric pressure near the Sierra Nevada, and the movement of air from high pressure to low pressure creates wind.

The first ten days of September 2024 experienced above-average peak temperatures in valleys in Western Nevada around 90 °F (32 °C). No precipitation was seen in that period. Strong regional winds contributed to the fire's spread on the day of ignition. On September 11, there were sustained winds up to 40 mph (64 km/h) caused by a low–pressure area passing over the Pacific Northwest, with the Reno area around the southern point. Across the Western United States, climate change has caused more impactful heat waves and has led to an increase of wildfires in the Western United States.

An abundance of the invasive species Bromus tectorum (simply known as cheatgrass) contributed to conditions conducive for wildfire spread across Nevada in 2024, allowing more frequent ignition and more rapid spread. The two previous winters, 2022–23 and 2023–24, both saw an above–average snowpack, resulting in larger numbers of cheatgrass across the state. Drought and hot conditions dried out cheatgrass and other vulnerable vegetation in spring and summer, providing the wildfires a plentiful amount of dry fuel. Dry conditions were present throughout Western Nevada during the fire; all of southern Washoe County was under abnormally dry conditions. (Note: The United States Drought Monitor classifies dry or drought-stricken areas in five levels: D0 means "abnormally dry" and D4 means "exceptional drought". D0 is generally classified as 20.01 to 30.00 percentile for precipitation.) The fire primarily burned in dry brush. The Davis Fire burned in areas of Humboldt-Toiyabe National Forest that were much denser than historically: many forests in the Sierra Nevada have grown denser due to strict orders in the 20th century to immediately suppress all wildfires. Such fuels included pine needles, dead leaves, and dead tree limbs.

The Davis Fire burned in a wildland-urban interface, the heavily populated foothills of the Carson Range, increasing the number of structures threatened. Carson City stated that many people are leaving urban environments to live in the forested foothills of the Sierra Nevada. A wildland-urban interface increases the difficulty of suppression operations because firefighters must protect structures in natural terrain.

The Truckee Meadows Fire Protection District's (TMFPD) Bowers Mansion station permanently closed in 2022 after a bat infestation. TMFPD reported repairs would have cost tens of thousands of dollars, and it was their slowest office, averaging only one call per day. The Bowers Mansion station was 2 miles (3.2 km) from Davis Creek Regional Park, and the closest station in operation when the Davis Fire started was the Eastlake Station. KRNV-DT reporting driving from the Bowers Mansion station to Davis Creek Regional Park took under two minutes while driving there from the Eastlake Station took roughly five minutes and thirty seconds. A resident stated having a closer station would have helped "big time" in combatting the fire.

== Cause ==
The Davis Fire was first reported in the day use area of Davis Creek Regional Park around 2:30 pm on September 7, 2024, burning in heavy timber and brush. After extensive investigations, the fire was determined to have been started accidentally by an improperly extinguished campfire, although campfires are not permitted in the day use area of Davis Creek Regional Park.

== Progression ==
=== September 7–11 ===
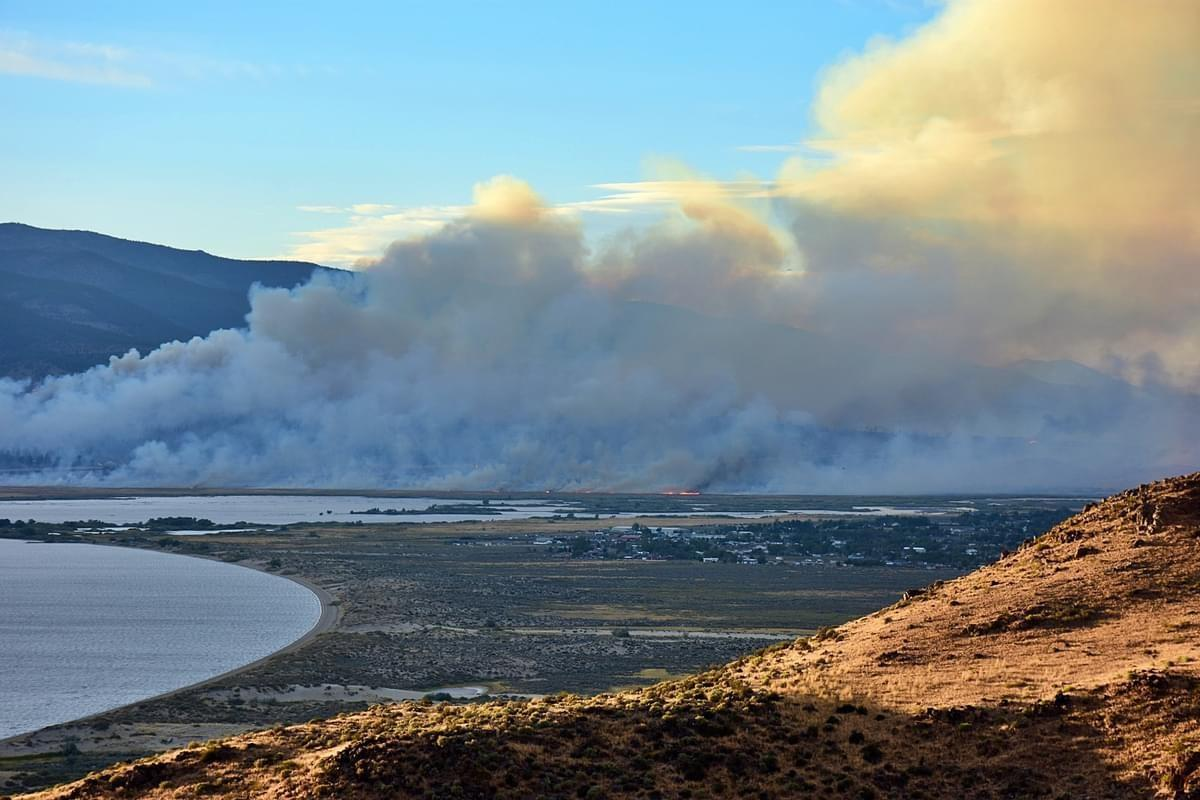
The fire burning near Washoe Lake on September 7

On September 7 around 2:30 pm, a three-acre (1.2 ha) vegetation fire was reported burning in heavy timber and brush in Davis Creek Regional Park. The fire quickly destroyed structures in the park. Evacuations were ordered in southwest Reno and New Washoe City, accompanied by an evacuation warning in Virginia City Highlands. (Note: An evacuation warning signifies there is a potential threat to life or property and an evacuation order is a lawful order to evacuate due to immediate threat to life or property.) Interstate 580 was closed in both directions from Damonte Ranch Parkway in Reno to College Parkway in Carson City. A resident stated, "traffic was backed up for miles on backroads out of Washoe Valley". The fire spread to 1,500 acres (610 ha) that evening. An evacuation center was put crated at the Washoe County Senior Citizen Center. Washoe County Regional Animal Services had mobile shelters for small animals, and large animal shelters opened at the University of Nevada, Reno Equestrian Center in Reno and Fuji Park and Silver Saddle Ranch in Carson City. Officials at the Nevada Governor's Office contacted agencies from several other states to assist with containing the fire. U.S. Route 395 Alternate closed in Washoe Valley. NV Energy cut power to 18,698 customers. Those who had not yet lost power were told to prepare for "potential long outages".

On September 8, Davis Fire had grown to 6,500 acres (2,600 ha) and had made an extreme northwards spread along State Route 431, also known as Mount Rose Highway. Interstate 580 reopened between Reno and Carson City and Alternate US 395 reopened to the interchange with Bowers Mansion Road. Between 12,000 and 14,000 were impacted by evacuation notices, and several hotels were giving discounted rates on rooms for evacuees. However, evacuations north of Mount Rose Highway that were lifted overnight were reinstated. Governor Joe Lombardo declared a state of emergency due to the Davis Fire, and Washoe County declared an emergency proclamation. Fire crews prioritized keeping the fire south and east of Mount Rose Highway. Evacuations expanded that night as winds drove the fire towards Mount Rose Highway.

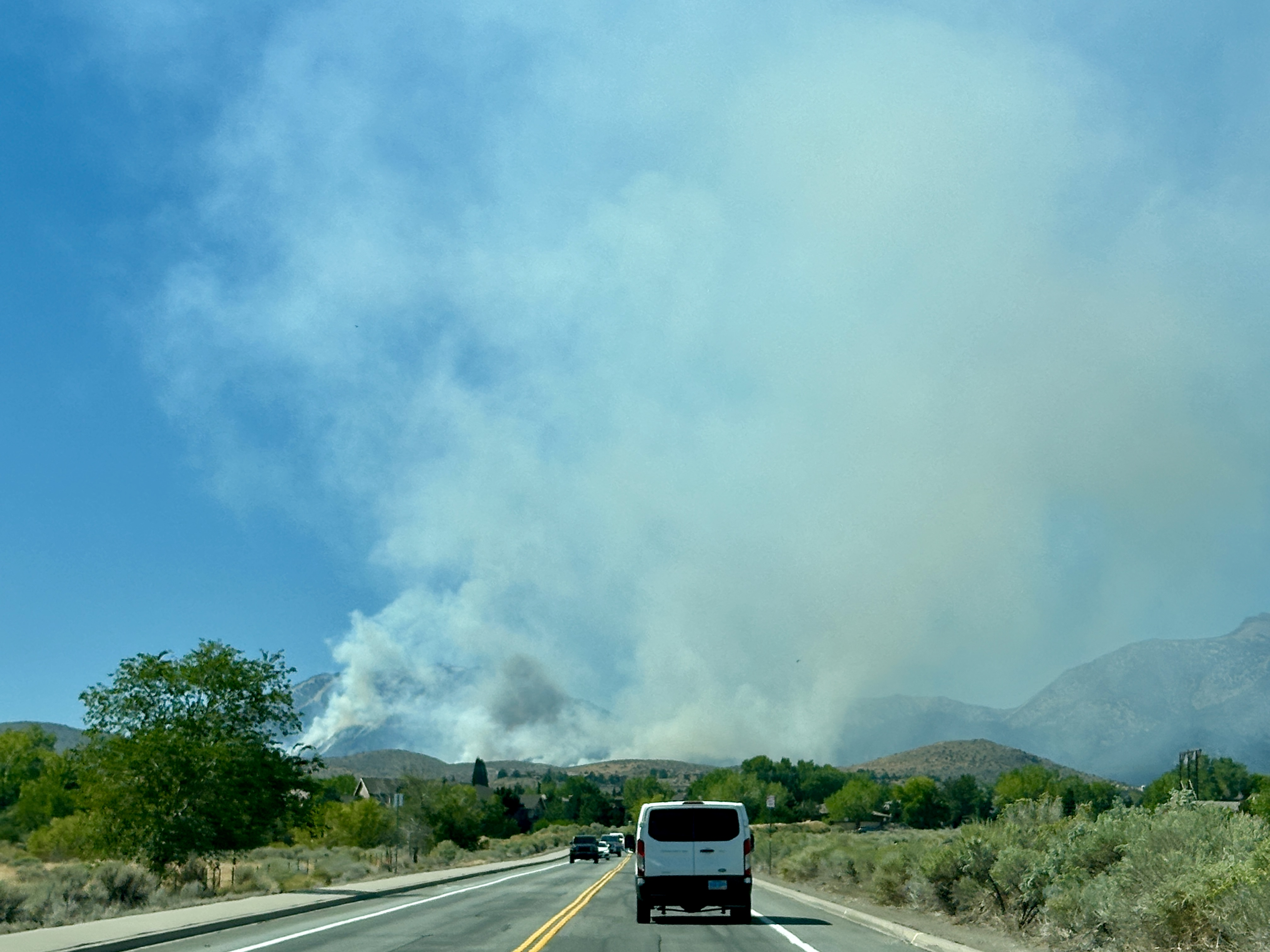
The Davis Fire in the foothills of Slide Mountain on September 10

The estimated size was lowered to 4,703 acres (1,903 ha) on September 9. Active fire behavior was observed on the southwestern edge near Mount Rose Highway. Despite aircraft limitations from strong wind and smoke, crews utilized roads and natural features. Local strike teams prioritized structure protection, and out–of–state resources were sent in. The evacuation warning for Virginia City Highlands was lifted and most power had been restored.

A red flag warning was issued on September 10, with such conditions allowing the fire to spread to 5,600 acres (2,300 ha). So far, suppression efforts cost $1.2 million. Crews worked on controlling the fire's perimeter, particularly in areas of high activity. Containment increased to 31% and a community meeting was held that night. Evacuation orders were reduced to evacuation warnings in Pleasant Valley and New Washoe City.

Map that forecast where the Davis Fire could have spread from September 11–13

A particularly dangerous situation was issued for September 11 because forecasts predicted sustained winds from 40–70 mph (64–113 km/h), largely from a cold front moving over the area. This was the sixth particularly dangerous situation issued by the National Weather Service Reno, the first since 2019. Evacuation warnings were issued in west Reno up to State Route 659, also known as McCarran Boulevard. Overnight, the fire spotted Mount Rose Highway. The strong winds grounded firefighting aircraft. All off–duty firefighters in the "Reno area" were ordered to work on the fire. However, the fire grew minimally; crews held the fire where it spotted Mount Rose Highway. There were 600 firefighters assigned to the fire. The fire grew to 5,824 acres (2,357 ha) and was 37% contained, but 2,600 structures were still threatened. All evacuation orders and warnings remained in place because of the fire's remaining threat to grow overnight.

=== September 12 onwards ===
Winds had subsided on September 12 with cooler temperatures around 70 °F (21 °C), and humidity levels reached 60%. The fire stayed within its footprint, and crews achieved 56% containment. Containment lines were established for the northernmost part of the fire, the area of the fire that posed the greatest risk to homes in Reno. Half of the customers without power were re-energized, and the evacuation warnings between the Arrowcreek neighborhood and McCarran Boulevard were lifted.

On September 13, crews conducted firing operations near Winter Creek Road. Evacuation orders were lifted in Montreux. The cold front moving in brought moisture on September 14 that would last for several days. Containment increased to 76%, and evacuation orders in Galena and St. James Village were lowered to evacuation warnings. On September 15, firefighters changed suppression to be conducive for forest regrowth by removing resources from secured areas.

The fire was at 85% containment by September 16 and the entirety of Mount Rose Highway reopened. "Widespread showers" were reported. On September 17, the fire was now 92% contained, and a burned area emergency response team and local agencies began conducting a damage assessment in the burned area. Crews were split between patrolling the fire's perimeter and repairing the affected area; mop–up and suppression efforts had concluded.

The Davis Fire was fully contained on September 25, 2024 at a final size of 5,824 acres (2,357 ha).

== Effects ==
=== Damage ===
Burn severity map of the Davis Fire burn scar

Debris flow probability map in and around Davis Fire burn scar

The Davis Fire destroyed fourteen residential structures, two commercial structures, and twenty–two outbuildings. Among the burned structures was the Holy Spirit Catholic Mission, which hosted the only Latin Mass in Northern Nevada. Nearly all church documents were lost. The Chocolate Nugget Candy Factory was almost burned down by the fire, which came one foot (0.30 m) from the entrance. The Davis Fire threatened over 36,000 structures.

Washoe County experienced a suppression resource shortage during the fire and "significant economic obligations" from immediate response and predicted long-term recovery. Final suppression efforts cost about $12.6 million.

On September 11, Truckee Meadows Water Authority "urged" residents in southwest Reno to stop outdoor watering and minimize separate water usage. On September 7, 18,698 NV Energy customers across the Reno metropolitan area experienced power outages. A public safety outage watch was issued in Carson City, Glenbrook, and Genoa for 322 customers. Three broadcast stations on Slide Mountain were affected by power outages.

==== Davis Creek Regional Park ====
The fire burned about 118 acres (48 ha) of the 265 acres (107 ha) in Davis Creek Regional Park. Costs to repair the park are expected to exceed $2 million for a ranger residence and garage, electric infrastructure, five outbuildings, an amphitheater, a utility trailer, and various small equipment and utilities. Several restoration efforts have occurred, including erosion prevention, reseeding, and rebuilding. The park remained closed throughout 2025, while Davis Creek Campground and the equestrian center have remained closed. Davis Creek Regional Park was completely closed from the Davis Fire though the end of 2025 due to heavy infrastructure damage.

=== Injuries ===
One firefighter suffered an eye injury that was described as "life–altering" and "possibly career–ending" by the Reno Firefighters Association because he lost sight in his eye. A bear, found burned by the fire on September 17, was treated by the Nevada Department of Wildlife and Animal Ark Wildlife Sanctuary and Nature Center for third–degree burns. The bear was euthanized after its condition "worsened substantially" after September 20.

=== Closures and evacuations ===
The Washoe County School District (WCSD) cancelled classes for several schools between September 9 and September 13. To meet the Nevada Department of Education's mandates for minimum days in attendance, the school district cancelled the professional learning day (what was originally a staff–only day) scheduled for January 6, 2025 and elementary spring parent–teacher conferences. That same week, in–person classes at the University of Nevada, Reno Redfield Campus were cancelled. Firefighters closed and temporarily repurposed South Valleys Library as a command post.

Several roads were closed during the Davis Fire, including Interstate 580 from Damonte Ranch Parkway in Reno to College Parkway in Carson City, U.S. 395 Alternate, and Mount Rose Highway. Then vice president candidate Tim Walz postponed a rally scheduled in Reno on September 9. The event was rescheduled for October 8.

Approximately 20,000 people were placed under evacuation orders in south Reno, New Washoe City, and Washoe Valley. Guards were stationed in evacuated areas due to reports of looters.

The United States Forest Service (USFS) issued an emergency closure for portions of Humboldt–Toiyabe National Forest for civilians and firefighter safety. Mt. Rose Campground temporarily closed, reopening on September 25. Galena Creek Regional Park temporarily closed.

=== Environmental impacts ===
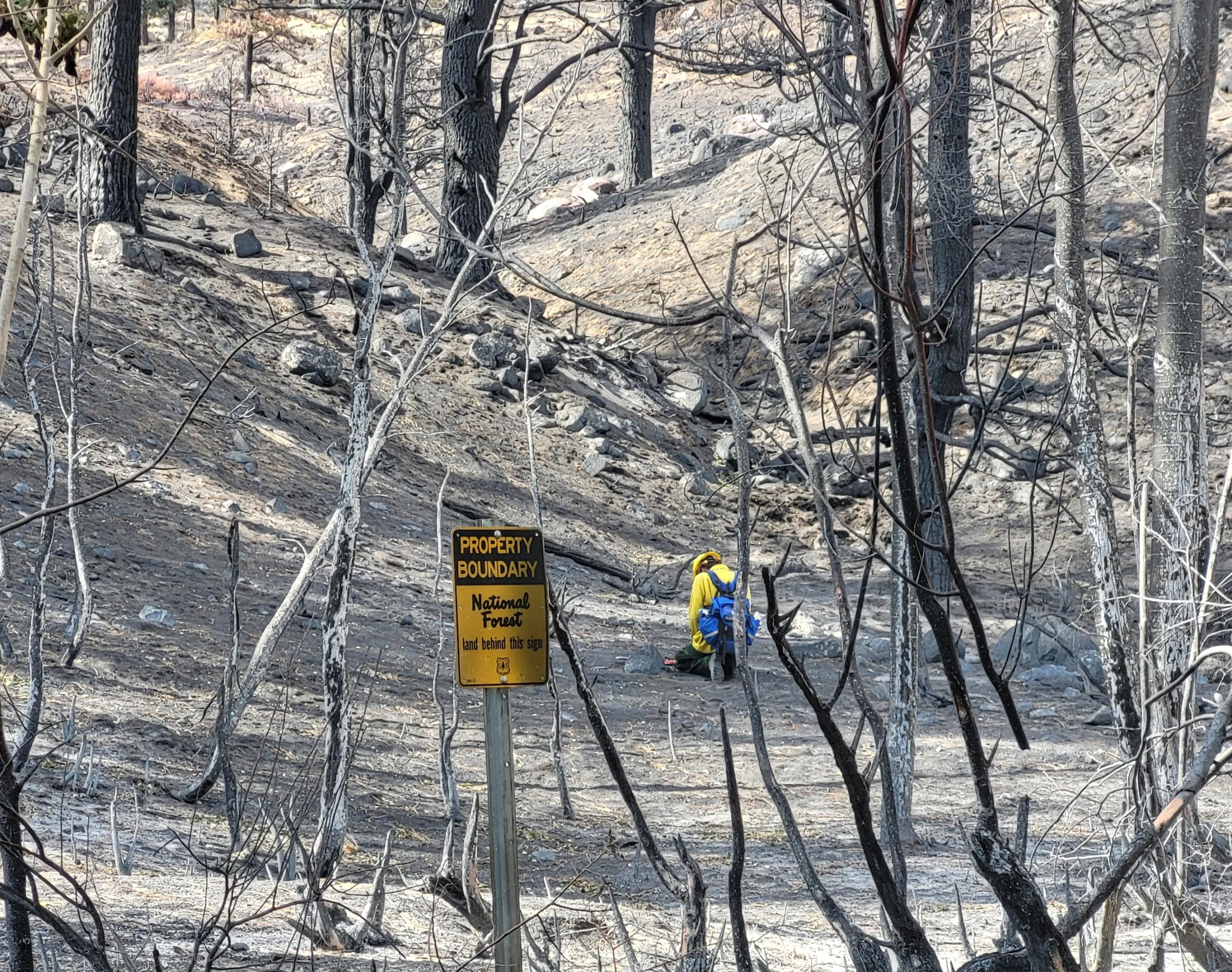
BAER team soil scientist Nathan Clark collecting soil samples from the burned area

The Northern Nevada Public Health Air Quality Management Division issued an air quality advisory in the Reno metropolitan area. Air quality monitors in southern Washoe County reached unhealthy levels. The Davis Fire and Bridge, Line, and Airport fires in Southern California contributed to smoke pollution in Southern Nevada.

Investigations and damage assessments reported that most soil would not be severely damaged by the fire, and afflicted soil will likely recover in the next five years. Several areas were found to be at risk of major erosion or runoff during periods of heavy rain and an increased flash flood risk due to water–repellent soil. As the fire burned in the foothills and at the base of Slide Mountain, avalanches and rockslides were expected to occur in the burned area. The Washoe Valley Watershed was polluted with ash. The National Weather Service warned trees burned by the Davis Fire could be blown down during high wind events, with such advisories documented as late as February 15, 2026.

== Growth and containment table ==
Fire containment status Gray: contained; Red: active; %: percent contained;
Date	Area burned	Personnel	Containment	Ref.
September 7	1,500 acres (610 ha; 6.1 km^{2})	Unknown		
September 8	6,500 acres (2,600 ha; 26 km^{2}) (Note: Estimate)	600		
September 9	5,000 acres (2,000 ha; 20 km^{2}) (Note: Size revised due to more accurate mapping.)	600		
September 10	5,596 acres (2,265 ha; 22.65 km^{2})	423		
September 11	5,646 acres (2,285 ha; 22.85 km^{2})	620		
September 12	5,824 acres (2,357 ha; 23.57 km^{2})	631		
September 13	5,824 acres (2,357 ha; 23.57 km^{2})	685		
September 14	5,824 acres (2,357 ha; 23.57 km^{2})	710		
September 15	5,824 acres (2,357 ha; 23.57 km^{2})	642		
September 16	5,824 acres (2,357 ha; 23.57 km^{2})	526		
September 17	5,824 acres (2,357 ha; 23.57 km^{2})	492		
September 18	5,824 acres (2,357 ha; 23.57 km^{2})	342		
—
September 25	5,824 acres (2,357 ha; 23.57 km^{2})	Unknown		

== See also ==
- 2024 Nevada wildfires
- 2024 United States wildfires
- Little Valley Fire
- Washoe Drive Fire
- Wildfires in 2024
