= Emily Warfield =

American actress (born 1972)

- Occupation: Actress

Emily Warfield is an American actress who made her acting debut with the TV movie Dream Date in 1989. She also co-starred in the movie The Man in the Moon with the then-unknown Reese Witherspoon in 1991.

Since then, she has appeared in a variety of guest roles on TV shows, from Doogie Howser, M.D. to L.A. Law. She also appeared in the last two Bonanza TV movies that aired on NBC in the early 1990s as Sarah, a member of that series' iconic Cartwright family.

== Filmography ==
=== Film ===
Year	Title	Role	Notes
1989	Blaze	Debbie Fleming	
1990	Love Hurts	Linda	
1991	The Man in the Moon	Maureen Trant	
1993	Calendar Girl	Becky O'Brien	
2005	Ready or Not	Patty Riorden	Short
2006	Counter-Fit	Margaret	Short
2015	Windsor	Carolyn Barnett	

=== Television ===
Year	Title	Role	Notes
1989	Dream Date	Girlfriend	TV film
1990	Pair of Aces	Debbie Metcalf	TV film
1992	CBS Schoolbreak Special	Jeanine	Episode: "Please, God, I'm Only Seventeen"
1992	L.A. Law	Tara McDermott	Episode: "From Here to Paternity"
1992	Doogie Howser, M.D.	Karen	Episode: "The Patient in Spite of Himself"
1993	Renegade	Jessica Good	Episode: "Billy"
1993	Murder, She Wrote	Abby Peters	Episode: "The Phantom Killer"
1993	Bonanza: The Return	Sara Cartwright	TV film
1995	Bonanza: Under Attack	Sara Cartwright	TV film
2007	Primal Doubt	Holly's Assistant	TV film
2007–2013	Days of Our Lives	Nurse Emily	Recurring role
2008	Aces 'N' Eights	Mother Sally	TV film
2010	Dad's Home	Female Shopper	TV film
2012	Operation Cupcake	Paula MacEwan	TV film
2013	In Reverie	Katherine Perry	Episodes: "Center of Attention", "1.11"
2014	Sweet Surrender	Susie	TV film
2014	Dallas	Dr. Hirsch	Episode: "Denial, Anger, Acceptance"
2015	American Crime	Lisa	Guest role (season 1)
