= 2024 Nevada wildfires =

Natural disasters in the USA

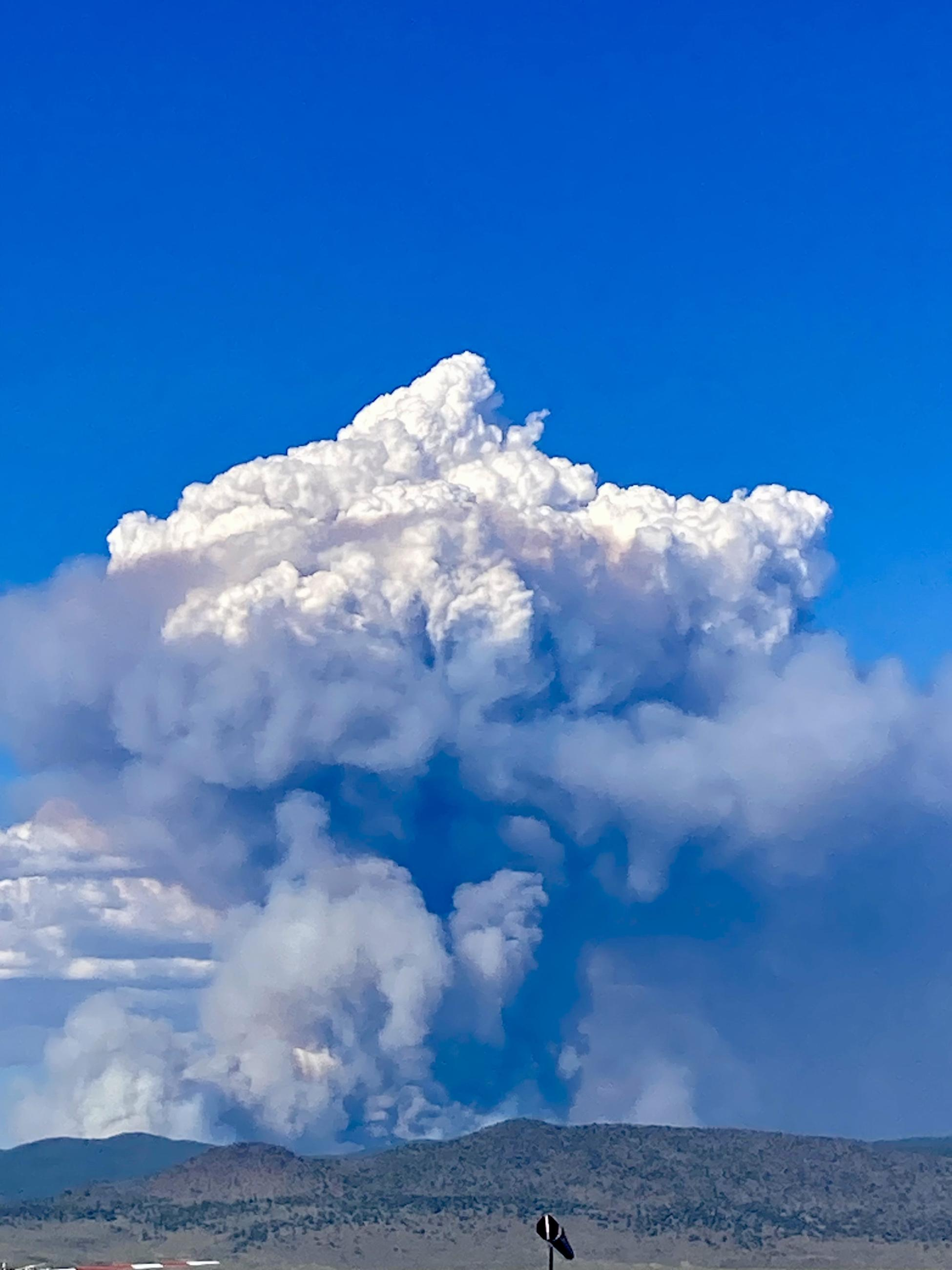
- A pyrocumulous cloud caused by the Pizona Fire that burned in the Inyo National Forest

Statistics
- Total fires: 858
- Total area: 103,595 acres (41,923 ha)

Impacts
- Cost: $15.5 million (2024 USD)

The 2024 Nevada wildfire season was a series of wildfires that burned throughout the U.S. state of Nevada during 2024.

Predictions for the 2024 fire season made by the National Interagency Fire Center forecast above average wildfire potential in the northern portion of the state through September and average wildfire potential throughout most of the rest of Nevada.

== Background ==
The typical fire season in Nevada lasts from May to October, the time when vegetation is the driest. However, the timing varies every year based on a number of other factors, including if there is hot, dry weather, the amount of dry vegetation, and when there are more natural causes possible, such as lightning. The peak time of the season is also determined by these factors. Historically, wildfire severity has increased due to large amounts of dry fuel, and acreage typically increases in drought-like and heavy precipitation years.

== Summary ==
In prior years, there had been above-average snow packs (especially in Western Nevada), which had hindered fire activity in previous years. However, this led to the growth of cheat grass, which dies off right before the fire season. This gave the wildfires in 2024 fuel that can allowed them to spread very quickly and ignite easier. Several months were abnormally warm and dry, particularly July to September. Drought was getting worse throughout these months, and July was the hottest month in Reno ever recorded. There was little precipitation throughout these months, as well.

This season included the Davis Fire, which burned south of Reno near New Washoe City in Davis Creek Regional Park. Strong winds in aided the fire’s rapid growth, and erratic winds on September 11 resulted in a particularly dangerous situation to be issued. This was because there was a chance the fire could’ve made an extreme northwards spread and destroyed hundreds of structures. The fire destroyed fourteen structures and twenty-two outbuildings and prompted evacuations for New Washoe City and Southwest Reno.

== List of wildfires ==
The following is a list of fires that burned more than 1,000 acres (400 ha), or produced significant structural damage or casualties.

Name	County	Acres	Start date	Containment date (Note: Containment means that fire crews have established and secured control lines around the fire's perimeter. These lines are artificial barriers, like trenches or cleared vegetation, designed to stop the fire's spread, or natural barriers like rivers. Containment reflects progress in managing the fire but does not necessarily mean the fire is starved of fuel, under control, or put out.)	Notes	Ref
Pizona	Mineral	2,160	June 26	July 5	Lighting-caused. Burned in Inyo National Forest and formed a pyrocumulous cloud	
Yellow Peak	Washoe	1,262	June 26	July 2	Lightning-caused. Burned about 25 miles (40 km) south of Adel, Oregon.	
Wilder	Humboldt	17,275	July 7	July 14	Human-caused	
North Creek	White Pine	1,100	July 7	July 14	Human-caused. Roughly 50 miles (80 km) northeast of Ely.	
Whisky Canyon	Lander	1,246	July 22	July 25	Lightning-caused. Was about 13 miles (21 km) south of Battle Mountain.	
Stockade Canyon	Washoe	18,168	July 24	August 13	Threatened historical structures. Ignited by lightning and burned roughly 19 miles (31 km) northwest of Gerlach.	
Able Flat	Humboldt	997	July 24	July 25		
Broom Canyon	Nye, White Pine	8,217	July 29	2024	Started by lightning. Burned in inaccessible terrain on Currant Mountain about 9 miles (14 km) east of Duckwater.	
Hobson	White Pine	1,080	August 18	August 23	Lightning-caused. Burned about 45 miles (72 km) northwest of Ely.	
Raglan	Humboldt	1,787	August 20	September 2	Started from illegal burn. Shut down part of Interstate 80 and led to power outages in Winnemucca.	
Range 77	Nye	7,876	August 22	August 25	Undetermined cause. Burned near Beatty.	
Davis	Washoe	5,824	September 7	September 25	14 structures impacted. Evacuations forced in New Washoe City and Southwest Reno. Started by an improperly extinguished campfire about 15 miles (24 km) south of Reno.	
Castle Ridge	Elko	25,885	October 6	October 19	Human-caused. Just north of Midas on Bureau of Land Management lands.	
Callahan	Washoe	61	November 11	November 21	Undetermined cause. Forced evacuations for 3,000 people south of Reno. Destroyed one house, two barns, and a gazebo and injured one firefighter.	

Perimeters of 2024 Nevada wildfires (map data)

== See also ==
- 2024 United States wildfires
