= Bonanza: The Next Generation =

1988 TV film

- Release poster
- Genre: Western
- Based on: Bonanza created by David Dortort
- Written by: Paul Savage
- Story by: David Dortort
- Directed by: William F. Claxton
- Starring: John Ireland; Robert Fuller; Barbara Anderson; Michael Landon Jr.; Brian A. Smith; John Amos
- Music by: Bob Cobert
- Country of origin: United States
- Original language: English

Production
- Executive producers: Tom Sarnoff; Alan Courtney
- Producer: David Dortort
- Production locations: Ponderosa Ranch - 100 Ponderosa Ranch Road, Incline Village, Lake Tahoe, Nevada; South Lake Tahoe, California; Spooner Lake, Lake Tahoe-Nevada State Park, Incline Village, Lake Tahoe, Nevada
- Cinematography: Stanley M. Lazan
- Editors: Alan C. Marks; J. Timothy Nuggent
- Running time: 93 minutes
- Production companies: Bonanza Ventures; Gaylord Productions

Original release
- Network: Syndication
- Release: March 23, 1988

Related
- Bonanza: The Return; Bonanza: Under Attack

Bonanza: The Next Generation is a 1988 American Western television film and a sequel to the 1959–1973 television series Bonanza starring John Ireland, Robert Fuller, Barbara Anderson, Michael Landon Jr., Brian A. Smith and John Amos. The film aired in syndication on March 23, 1988.

== Synopsis ==
When Ben Cartwright's seafaring brother, Aaron, (John Ireland) takes over the Ponderosa he signs over drilling rights to land-grabbers. Captain Aaron Cartwright's grand nephews arrive to save the ranch.

== Production ==
The film was written by David Dortort and Paul Savage, and directed by William F. Claxton. Bonanza: The Next Generation was the pilot for a television series that was never produced but was followed by two other television films Bonanza: The Return (1993) and Bonanza: Under Attack (1995).

=== Casting ===
None of the characters from the original series appears since the entire cast, with the exception of Pernell Roberts, Michael Landon and David Canary, had died. Lorne Greene had signed to reprise his role as patriarch Ben, but died shortly before production began. He was replaced by veteran actor John Ireland, who played Ben's brother Aaron. The movie features Michael Landon Jr. as the son of Little Joe Cartwright, and Gillian Greene, daughter of Lorne Greene, as his love interest.

== Cast ==
- John Ireland as Captain Aaron Cartwright
- Robert Fuller as Charlie Poke
- Barbara Anderson as Annabelle 'Annie' Cartwright
- Michael Landon Jr. as Benjamin 'Benj' Cartwright
- Brian A. Smith as Josh Cartwright
- John Amos as Mr. Mack
- Peter Mark Richman as Mr. Dunson
- Gillian Greene as Jennifer Sills
- Kevin Hagen as Nathaniel Amsted
- William Benedict as Gus Morton
- Richard Bergman as Sheriff Montooth
- Dabbs Greer as Sills
- Gary Reed as Eldon Poole
- Lee McLaughlin as Mayor
- Robert Hoy as Feathers
- Rex Linn as Cease
- Jack Lilley as Jory
- Jerry Gatlin as Deke
- Jeffrey Meyer as Lundeen
- Robert Jauregui as Cullen
- Jeffrey Boudov as Homer
- Laurie Rude as Rachel
- Clayton Staggs as Mover-Shaker
- David Q. Combs as Father

== See also ==
- Bonanza: The Return
- Bonanza: Under Attack
