= Bonanza: The Return =

1993 TV film

- Theatrical release poster
- Genre: Western
- Based on: Bonanza by David Dortort
- Teleplay by: Michael McGreevey
- Story by: Michael Landon Jr.; Michael McGreevey; Tom Brinson
- Directed by: Jerry Jameson
- Starring: Ben Johnson; Michael Landon Jr.; Emily Warfield
- Music by: Bruce Miller
- Country of origin: United States
- Original language: English

Production
- Executive producers: David Dortort; Tom Sarnoff
- Producer: Kent McCray
- Production locations: San Andreas, California; Tahoe Meadows, Lake Tahoe, California; Warner Ranch, Calabasas, California; Sierra Railroad, Jamestown, California; Ponderosa Ranch - 100 Ponderosa Ranch Road, Incline Village, Lake Tahoe, Nevada; Ponderosa Wagon Camp, Incline Village, Lake Tahoe, California
- Cinematography: Haskell B. Boggs
- Editor: John Loeffler
- Running time: 93 minutes
- Production companies: Legend Entertainment; NBC Productions

Original release
- Network: NBC
- Release: November 28, 1993

Related
- Bonanza: The Next Generation; Bonanza: Under Attack

Bonanza: The Return is a 1993 American Western made-for-television film. It is a sequel to both the 1959–1973 television series Bonanza and the 1988 made-for-television film Bonanza: The Next Generation. The film was directed by Jerry Jameson and featured noted character actors Ben Johnson, Jack Elam, Dean Stockwell, Linda Gray, and Richard Roundtree. The film premiered on NBC on November 28, 1993.

== Production ==
None of the characters from the original series appears, since the entire cast, with the exception of Pernell Roberts and David Canary, were dead. Michael Landon Jr. and Dirk Blocker, sons of the original series' stars, do appear, although Blocker, who looked and sounded almost exactly like his father, was cast in a different, smaller role, but his face and voice were featured prominently in the commercials advertising the film. Bonanza: The Return was followed two years later with the TV-movie Bonanza: Under Attack. David Canary, who portrayed Candy Canaday on the original series, was not involved with either TV movie.

== Plot ==
The setting is the Ponderosa in 1905. Augustus Brandenburg (Dean Stockwell), a land baron, attempts to take the Ponderosa first by legal, and then by illegal means, to strip the land of its natural resources. The story includes several flashbacks to the original series.

== Cast ==
- Ben Johnson as Bronc Evans
- Michael Landon Jr. as "Benj" Cartwright
- Emily Warfield as Sara Cartwright
- Alistair MacDougall as Adam "A.C." Cartwright Jr.
- Brian Leckner as Josh Cartwright
- Richard Roundtree as Jacob Briscoe
- Jack Elam as Buckshot
- Dirk Blocker as Walter Fenster
- David Sage as Miller Swanson
- Stewart Moss as Preston McAdam
- Dean Stockwell as Augustus Brandenburg
- Linda Gray as Abigail "Laredo" Stimmons
- John Ingle as Judge Jefferson MacKenzie
- Archie Lang as Dr. Green
- Richard Fullerton as Head Surveyor
- Charles Gunning as Otis

== Reception ==
Variety said, "Barring a big-screen version, it may be time to let the Cartwrights ride off into the sunset."
