= Bonanza: Under Attack =

1995 television film directed by Mark Tinker

- Genre: Western
- Based on: characters by David Dortort
- Story by: Denne Bart Petitclerc
- Directed by: Mark Tinker
- Starring: Ben Johnson; Jack Elam; Dennis Farina; Dirk Blocker; Richard Roundtree; Leonard Nimoy
- Music by: Bruce Miller
- Country of origin: United States
- Original language: English

Production
- Executive producers: David Dortort; Tom Sarnoff
- Producer: Kent McCray
- Production locations: Ponderosa Ranch - 100 Ponderosa Ranch Road, Incline Village, Lake Tahoe, Nevada; Ponderosa Wagon Camp, Incline Village, Lake Tahoe, California; Bowers Mansion Park - 4005 U.S. Highway 395 N., Carson City, Nevada; Davis Creek Regional Park, Carson City, Nevada
- Cinematography: Michael Meinardus
- Editor: William B. Stich
- Running time: 89 min.
- Production companies: Legend Entertainment; NBC Productions

Original release
- Network: NBC
- Release: January 15, 1995

Related
- Bonanza: The Next Generation; Bonanza: The Return

Bonanza: Under Attack is a 1995 American made-for-television Western film. It is a sequel to the 1959–1973 television series Bonanza and television films Bonanza: The Next Generation (1988) and Bonanza: The Return (1993). The film was directed by Mark Tinker and features noted character actors Ben Johnson, Jack Elam (in his final appearance), and Richard Roundtree (reprising their roles from the 1993 film), as well as Leonard Nimoy and Dennis Farina. The film premiered on NBC on January 15, 1995.

The only leading actors from the original series who were still alive during production, Pernell Roberts and David Canary, do not appear in the film. However, the cast does include Michael Landon Jr. and Dirk Blocker, sons of the original series's actors who starred as Little Joe and Hoss Cartwright.

Nimoy and Farina portray real-life figures, outlaw Frank James (brother of Jesse James) and Pinkertons detective Charlie Siringo.

== Cast ==
- Ben Johnson as Bronc Evans
- Michael Landon Jr. as Benjamin "Benj" Cartwright
- Dirk Blocker as Fenster
- Jack Elam as "Buckshot"
- Emily Warfield as Sara Cartwright
- Brian Leckner as Josh Cartwright
- Jeff Phillips as Adam "A.C." Cartwright Jr.
- Richard Roundtree as Jacob
- Dennis Farina as Charlie Siringo
- Leonard Nimoy as Frank James
- Ted Markland as Cole
- Gordon Jennison Noice as Jack "Black Jack" (credited as J. Gordon Noice)
- Kenny Call as Mears
