= Nevada Department of Wildlife =

State Agency of Wildlife

- Logo of Nevada Department of Wildlife

Department overview
- Formed: 1877
- Preceding Department: State Office of Fish Commissioner
- Jurisdiction: U.S. State of Nevada
- Headquarters: 6980 Sierra Center Pkwy #120, Reno, Nevada, US
- Department executive: Alan Jenne, Agency Director; Nevada Department of Wildlife
- Website: http://www.ndow.org

The Nevada Department of Wildlife (NDOW) is the state agency responsible for the restoration and management of fish and wildlife resources, and the promotion of boating safety on Nevada’s waters. NDOW has responsibility for the wildlife resources and enforcement of the wildlife and boating safety laws on 109,894 square miles (284,620 km^{2}) of land, 667 square miles (1,730 km^{2}) of water and 529 streams that flow 2,750 miles (4,430 km). NDOW's eleven state-owned wildlife management areas provide approximately 117,000 acres (47,000 ha) of wildlife habitat.

== History ==
In 1877 State Office of Fish Commissioner established by Legislature. In 1917 Three member commission name changed to State Fish and Game Commission and Office of State Game Warden established. In 1927 Three member State Fish and Game Commission increased to five members. In 1947 Five member State Fish and Game Commission increased to 17 elected members. In 1969 Seventeen member State Fish and Game Commission reduced to nine members, all appointed. Wildlife agency name changed from Fish and Game Commission to Nevada Department of Fish and Game. In 1979 Nine member Commission reduced to seven-member Board of Wildlife Commissioners, all appointed by the Governor and the name changed to State Board of Wildlife Commissioners and agency name changed to Nevada Department of Wildlife. In 1993 Nevada Department of Wildlife changed and moved to a Division under the Nevada Department of Conservation and Natural Resources. And in July 2003 Nevada Division of Wildlife changed to Nevada Department of Wildlife and moved to a cabinet-level agency.

== Organizational structure ==
The department is led by a governor-appointed director, who also serves as the secretary of the Wildlife Commission. Two deputy directors are directly responsible to the director. Resource division chiefs report to the deputy director of programs while the Operations Division and the Fiscal Services Section report to the deputy director of administrative services. NDOW coordinates agency planning activities, legislation, and support operations by senior management.

== Regional divisions ==
The Nevada Department of Wildlife divides the State of Nevada into four management regions, whose boundaries mostly correspond to county borders. They are:

- Reno Office
- Western Region Office
  - Fallon
- Eastern Region Office
  - Elko
- Southern Region Offices
  - Las Vegas, Nevada
  - Henderson, Nevada

== Nevada wildlife ==
There are or were 892 species of mammals, reptiles, fish, birds and amphibians in Nevada. Of that number, 790 species are native, 64 are only found in Nevada, 102 have been brought into the state and 32 are extinct.

- 161 mammals
- 173 fish
- 24 amphibians
- 78 reptiles
- 456 birds

== Birds and fish game ==
=== Bird game ===
Nevada's game bird resources include chukar and Hungarian partridge, sage, blue and ruffed grouse, California, Gambel, and mountain quail, ring necked pheasants, mourning dove and wild turkey. Waterfowl associated with the state's aquatic areas include northern pintail, mallard, America wigeon, redhead and wood ducks as well as Canada and snow geese.

=== Big game ===
Latest available numbers indicate that Nevada had estimated adult populations of 105,000 mule deer, 18,500 pronghorn, 5,100 desert bighorn sheep, 210 Rocky Mountain bighorns, 1,500 California bighorn sheep, 7,400 Rocky Mountain elk, 370 Rocky Mountain goats and about 2,700 young and adult mountain lions.

=== Fish facts ===
Nevada has four native game fish: Lahontan and Bonneville cutthroat trout, Great Basin redband trout, bull trout and mountain whitefish. Introduced game fish include bass, catfish, crappie, walleye and rainbow, brown and brook trout. There are 77 species and subspecies of native nongame fish that reside in Nevada's waters ranging from the speckled dace to the razorback sucker.

== Game wardens ==
A game warden for the Nevada Department of Wildlife (NDOW), has been named the (National Wildlife officer) of the Year by the (North American Wildlife Enforcement Officers Association). The annual award was given to the Reno based game warden in a ceremony held in Saskatoon, Saskatchewan in Canada during the organization’s annual conference.

== See also ==
- List of state and territorial fish and wildlife management agencies in the United States
- List of law enforcement agencies in Nevada
