= Las Vegas Valley =

Metropolitan area in Nevada, United States

- Metropolitan Statistical Area
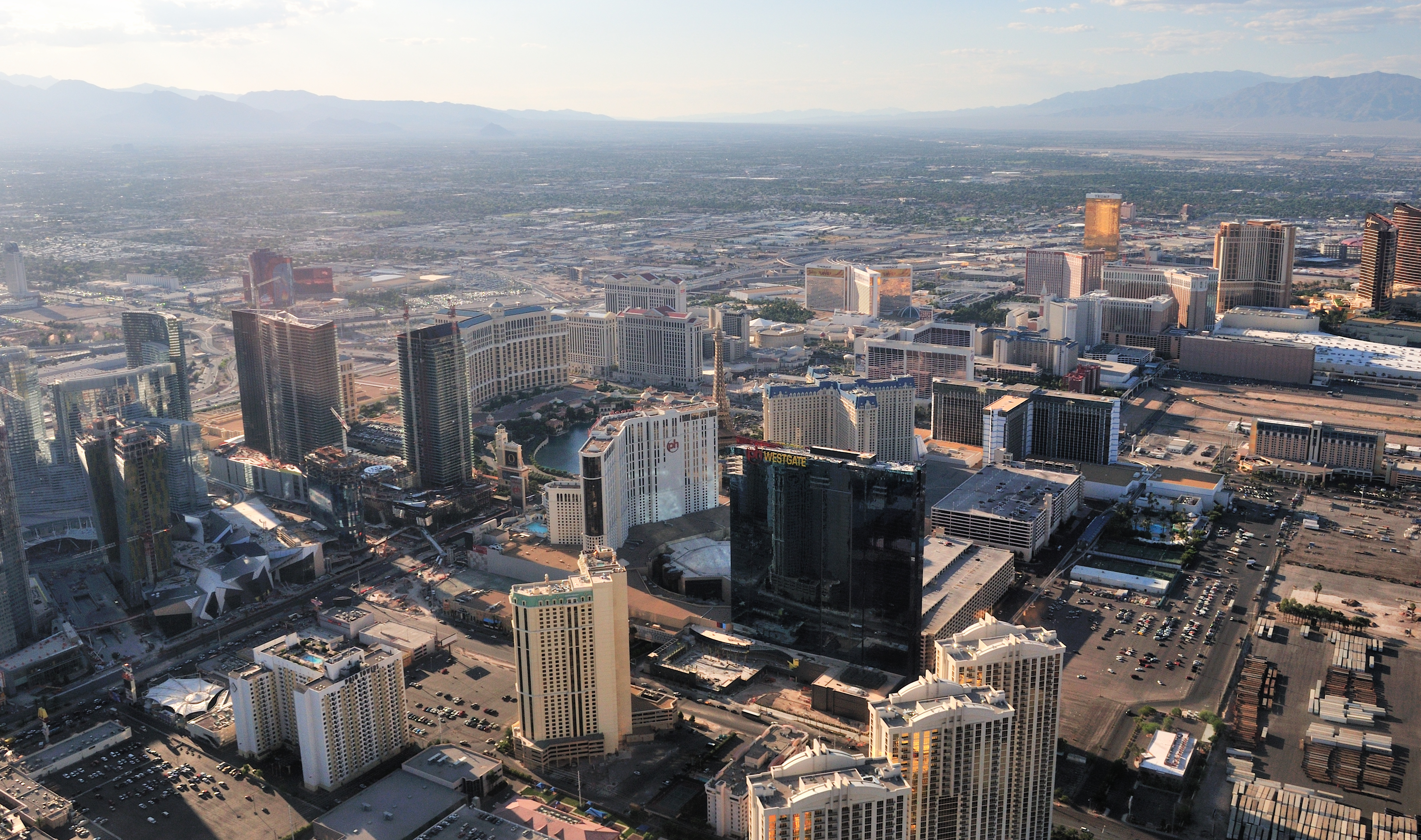
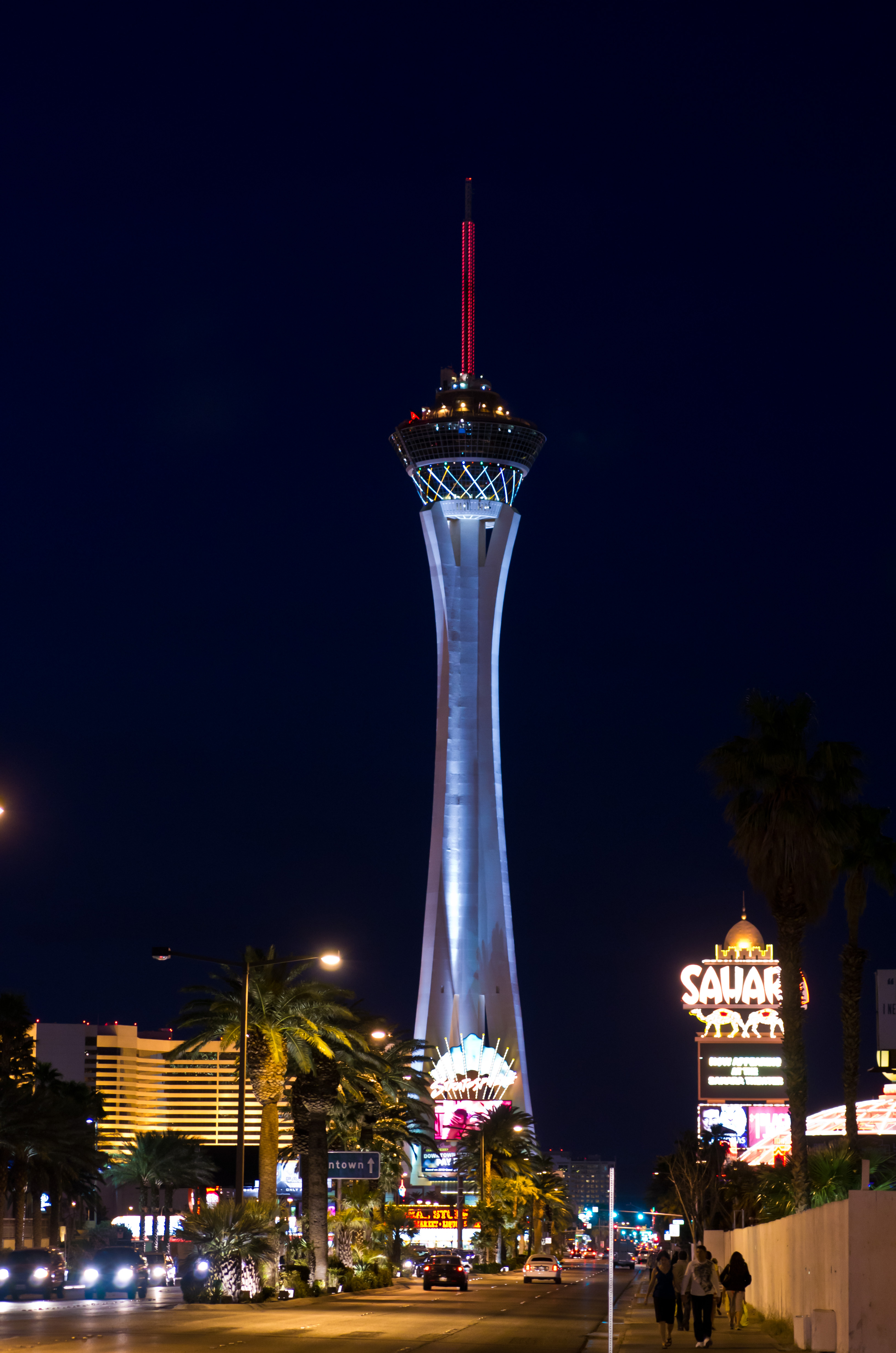
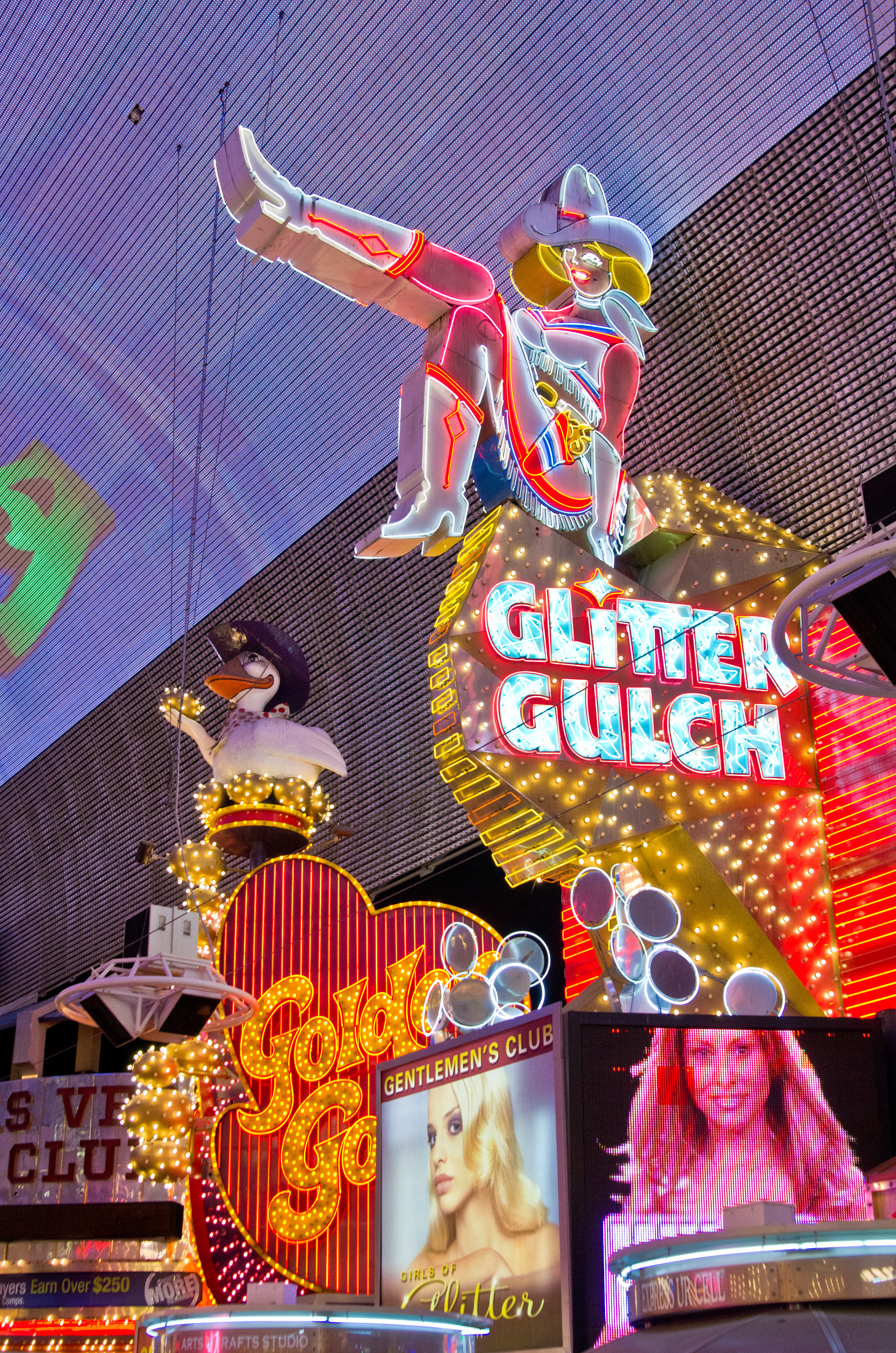
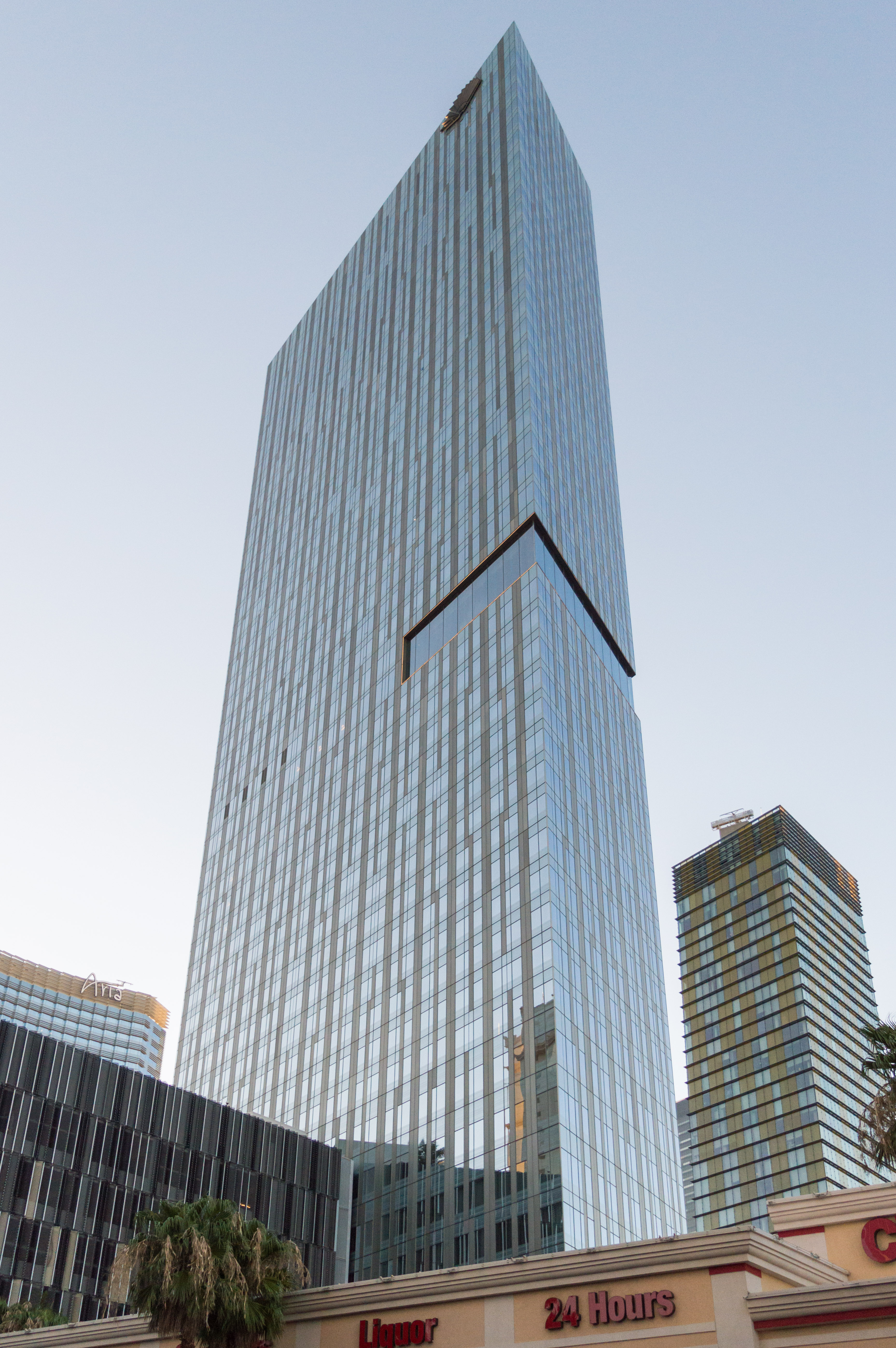
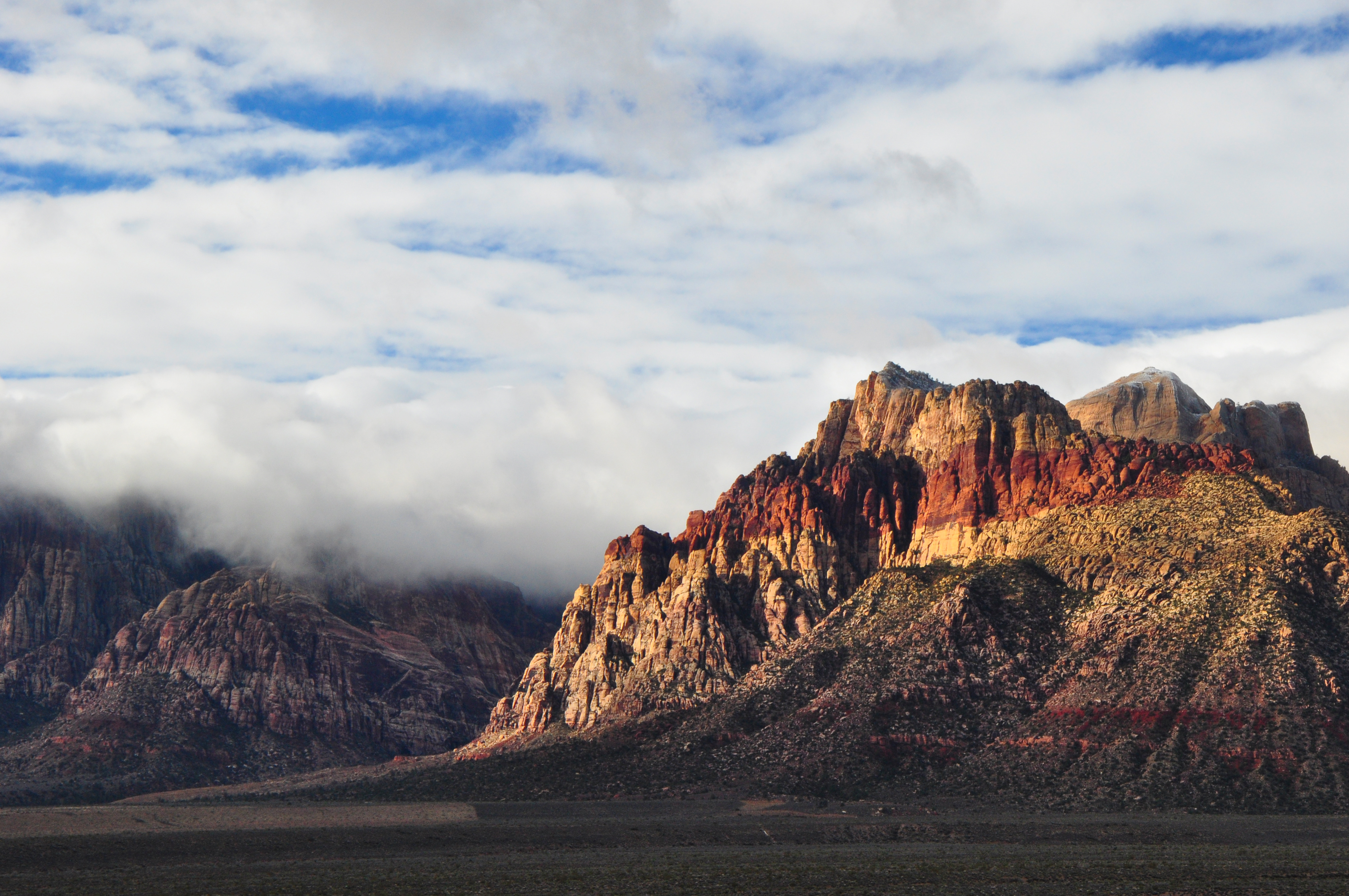
- Left-right from top: Las Vegas Strip, Stratosphere Tower, Fremont Street Experience, Waldorf Astoria Las Vegas, Red Rock Canyon National Conservation Area, The District at Green Valley Ranch
Interactive Map of Las Vegas–Henderson, NV CSA
City of Las Vegas
City of Henderson
City of North Las Vegas
Town of Enterprise
Town of Spring Valley
Town of Sunrise Manor
Town of Paradise
Town of Whitney
Town of Winchester
City of Boulder City
Nellis Air Force Base
Las Vegas–Henderson–North Las Vegas MSA (Remainder)
Town of Pahrump
Pahrump µSA
- Country: United States
- State: Nevada
- Largest city: Las Vegas
- Other major cities and unincorporated areas: - Henderson; - North Las Vegas; - Enterprise; - Spring Valley; - Sunrise Manor; - Paradise; - Whitney; - Winchester; - Boulder City

Area
  - Urban: 540 sq mi (1,400 km^{2})
  - Metro: 1,600 sq mi (4,100 km^{2})

Population (2024 estimate)
  - Metropolitan Statistical Area: 2,421,685

GDP
  - Urban: $195.936 billion (2024)
  - Per capita: $80,909 (2024)
- Time zone: UTC-8 (PST)
  - Summer (DST): UTC-7 (PDT)
- Area codes: 702 and 725

The Las Vegas Valley is a major metropolitan area in the southern part of the U.S. state of Nevada, and the second-largest in the Southwestern United States. The state's largest urban agglomeration, the Las Vegas Metropolitan Statistical Area is coextensive since 2003 with Clark County, Nevada. The Valley is largely defined by the Las Vegas Valley land formation, a 600-square-mile (1,600 km^{2}) basin area surrounded by mountains to the north, south, east and west of the metropolitan area. The Valley is home to the three largest incorporated cities in Nevada: Las Vegas, Henderson and North Las Vegas. Eleven unincorporated towns governed by the Clark County government are part of the Las Vegas Township and constitute the largest community in the state of Nevada.

The names Las Vegas and Vegas are interchangeably used to indicate the Valley, the Strip, and the city, and as a brand by the Las Vegas Convention and Visitors Authority to denominate the region. The Valley is affectionately known as the Ninth Island by Hawaii natives and Las Vegans alike, in part due to the large number of people originally from Hawaii who live in and regularly travel to Las Vegas.

Since the 1990s, the Las Vegas Valley has seen rapid growth, tripling its population from 741,459 in 1990 to 2,227,053 estimated in 2018, increasing to 2,421,685 in 2024. The Las Vegas Valley remains one of the fastest growing metropolitan areas in the United States. In its relatively short history, it has established a diverse presence in international business, commerce, urban development, and entertainment, as well as one of the most visited tourist attractions destinations in the world. In 2014, a record-breaking 41 million people visited the Las Vegas area, producing a gross metropolitan product of more than $100 billion.

== History ==
The first reported non-Native American visitor to the Las Vegas Valley was the Mexican scout Rafael Rivera in 1829. Las Vegas was named by Mexicans in the Antonio Armijo party, including Rivera, who used the water in the area while heading north and west along the Old Spanish Trail from Texas. In the 19th century, areas of the valley contained artesian wells that supported extensive green areas, or meadows, hence the name Las Vegas (vegas being Spanish for "meadows").

The area was previously settled by Mormon farmers in 1854, and later became the site of a United States Army fort in 1864, beginning a long relationship between southern Nevada and the U.S. military. Since the 1930s, Las Vegas has generally been identified as a gambling center as well as a resort destination, primarily targeting adults.

Nellis Air Force Base is located in the northeast corner of the valley. The ranges that the Nellis pilots use and various other land areas used by various federal agencies, limit growth of the valley in terms of geographic area.

Businessman Howard Hughes arrived in the late 1960s and purchased many casino hotels, as well as television and radio stations in the area. Legitimate corporations began to purchase casino hotels as well, and the mob was run out by the federal government over the next several years. The constant stream of tourist dollars from the hotels and casinos was augmented by a new source of federal money from the establishment of what is now Nellis Air Force Base. The influx of military personnel and casino job-hunters helped start a land building boom which is now leveling off.

The Las Vegas area remains one of the world's top entertainment destinations.

== Boundaries ==
The valley is contained in the Las Vegas Valley landform. This includes the cities of Las Vegas, North Las Vegas and Henderson, and the unincorporated towns of Summerlin South, Paradise, Spring Valley, Sunrise Manor, Enterprise, Winchester and Whitney. The valley is located within the larger metropolitan area, as the metropolitan area covers all of Clark County including parts that do not fall within the valley.

The government of Clark County has an "Urban Planning Area" of Las Vegas. This definition is a roughly rectangular area, about 20 mi (32 km) from east to west and 30 miles (48 km) from north to south. Notable exclusions from the "Urban Planning Area" include Red Rock, Blue Diamond and Mount Charleston.

The Las Vegas Metropolitan Police Department is the largest police department in the valley and the state and exercises jurisdiction in the entire county. There are approximately 3,000 police officers who cover the city of Las Vegas; unincorporated areas; the town of Laughlin, about 90 mi (140 km) from Downtown Las Vegas; and desert, park, and mountain areas within Clark County. The department does not exercise primary jurisdiction in areas with separate police forces such as North Las Vegas, Henderson, Boulder City, Nellis Air Force Base and the Paiute reservation.

The metropolitan area was created for the 1970 census when it only included Clark County. In 2000, the metropolitan area was changed to include Nye County, Nevada and Mohave County, Arizona, but it later returned to only being Clark County.

The Office of Management and Budget has designated Clark County as the Las Vegas-Henderson-Paradise, NV Metropolitan Statistical Area. The United States Census Bureau ranked the Las Vegas-Henderson-Paradise, NV Metropolitan Statistical Area as the 31st most populous metropolitan statistical area of the United States as of July 1, 2012.

The Office of Management and Budget has further designated the Las Vegas-Henderson-Paradise, NV Metropolitan Statistical Area as a component of the more extensive Las Vegas–Henderson, NV CSA, the 27th most populous combined statistical area and the 30th most populous primary statistical area of the United States as of July 1, 2012.

== Geography and environment ==
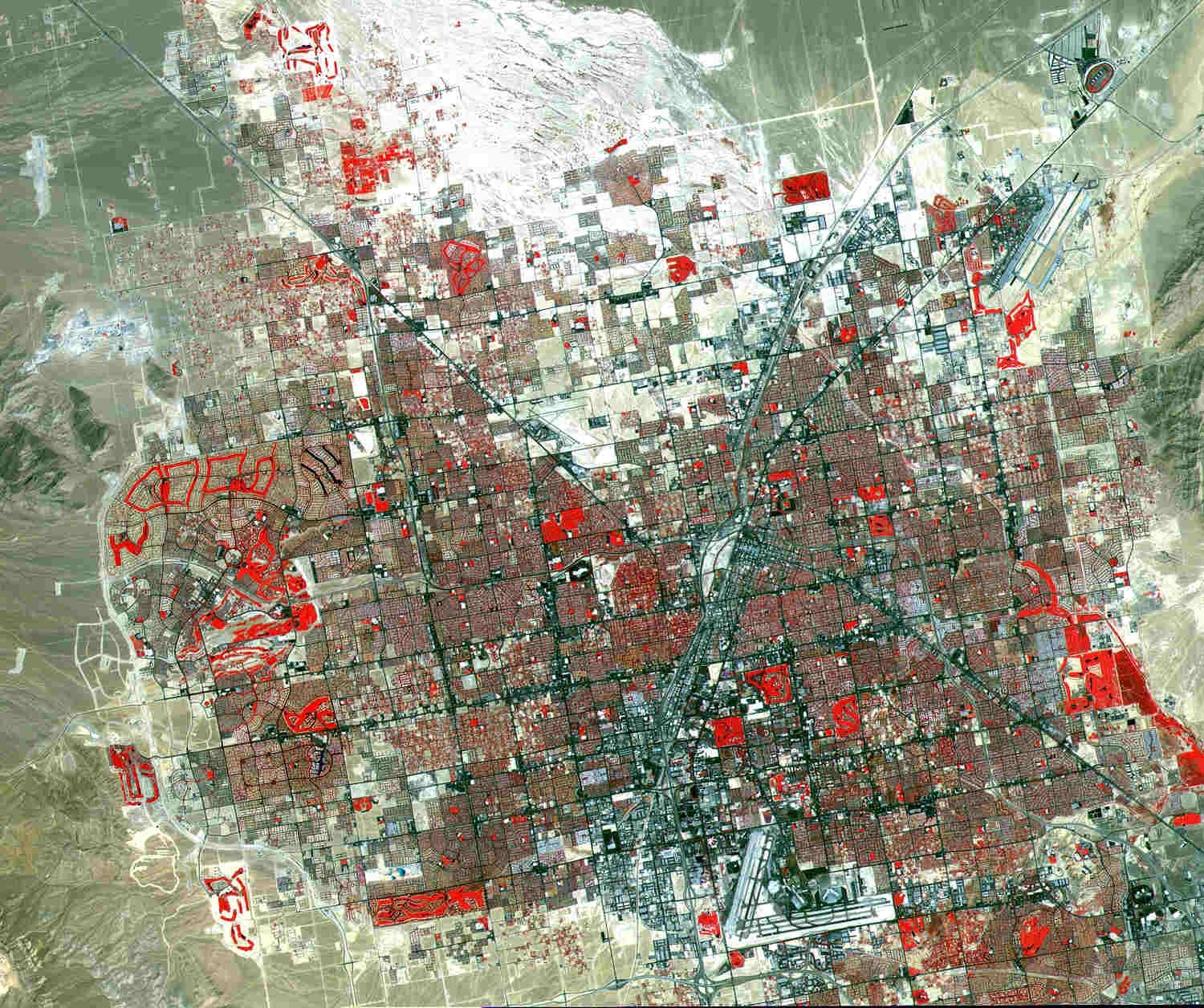
Las Vegas Valley viewed in false color, from 438 mi (705 km) by TERRA satellite. Grass-covered land, such as golf courses, appears in red. The picture bottom is just south of Sunset Road and the airport, the Spring Mountains on the west and Sunrise Mountain on the east.

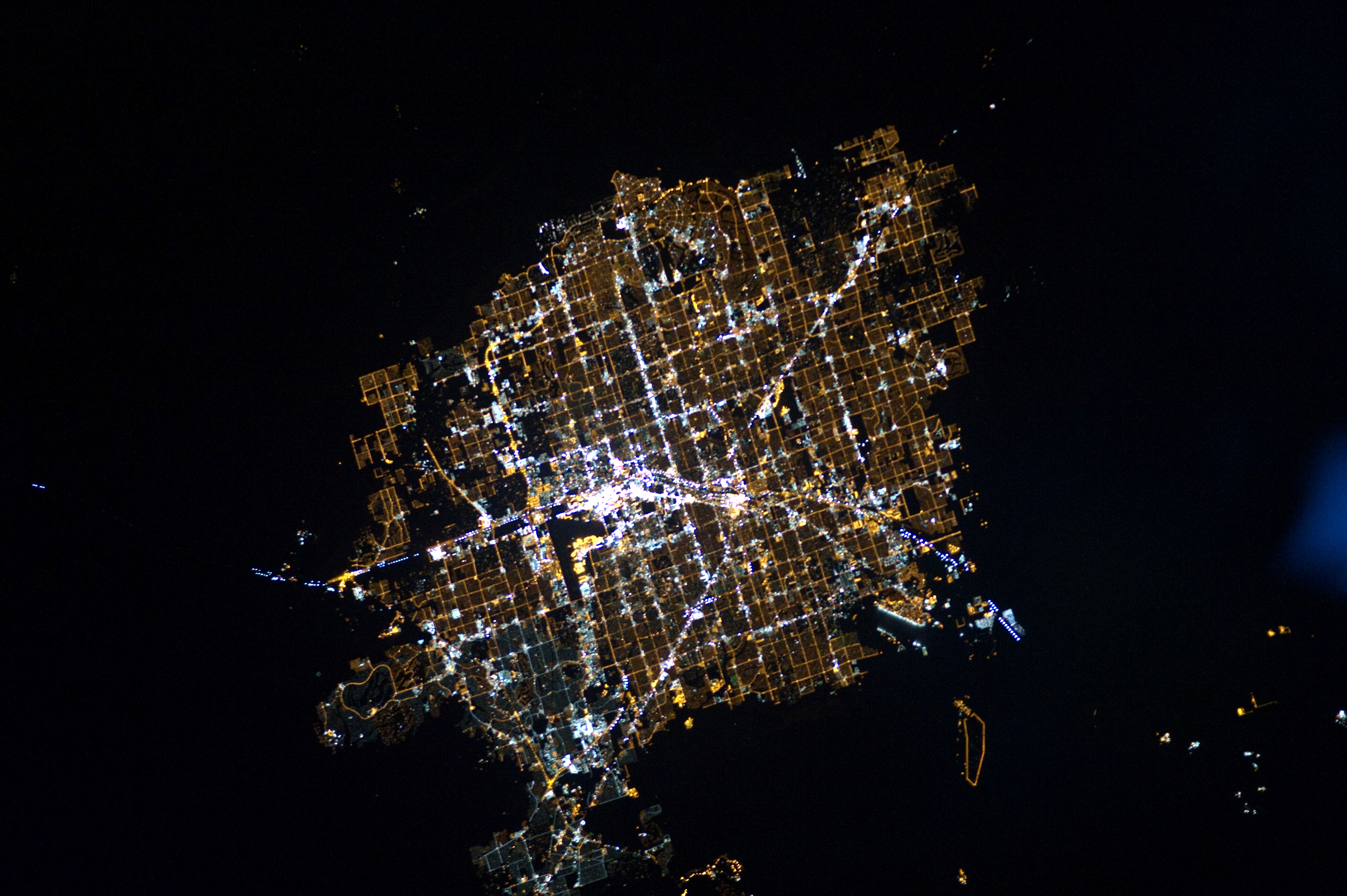
Las Vegas at night in 2010

The Las Vegas Valley lies in the Mojave Desert. The valley in the northwest section is a northwest-by-southeast trending area, and trending parallel to Las Vegas Wash, lies at the northeast of the Spring Mountains massif.

U.S. Route 95 leaves Las Vegas's northwest and goes northwesterly through the northwest valley section with Las Vegas Wash about 2 miles (3 km) northeast. U.S. 95 lies on the southwest perimeter of the valley bottomlands and small alluvial fan areas from the northeast Spring Mountains border southwest.

A "distorted surface", a playa-like region, occurs at the farthest northwest area, for about 15 to 18 miles (24 to 29 km), starting from State Route 157. At State Route 156, 10 miles (16 km) northwest, the distorted surface, bottom land turns north, a 6 miles (9.7 km) area in length and about 3 miles (4.8 km) wide. It lies at the south drainage section of the Three Lakes Valley, where a water divide separates Dog Bone Lake in the valley's center from the southwest washes that drain into the Las Vegas Valley (upland Las Vegas Wash).

The Corn Creek Dunes lie about 5 miles (8.0 km) southwest of Route 156's intersection with U.S. 95 and they are slightly northeast of Las Vegas Wash.

The Las Vegas Valley is around 1,600 square miles (4,100 km^{2}). All perimeters, except the northwest, are foothills or mountain ranges, with all highway routes entering the foothills; this includes the Interstate 15 to the southwest, as it climbs to Jean Pass (north), before traversing Ivanpah Valley. Only the U.S. Route 95 northwest follows an actual valley. The northwest section, thus describes the entire landform as a central, and large valley with an attached feeder valley northwest, and in this case the northwest source, and actual course of the Las Vegas Wash.

The valley is a fault-bounded structural and hydrologic basin made of alluvial-fan deposits. There are several aquifers contained within the valley including the Las Vegas Aquifer. These heavily depleted water sources exist at about 660–980 feet (200–300 m) in depth. As of 1986, estimate show that the valley floor in Downtown Las Vegas has subsided by about 6.2 feet (1.9 m) and about 2.9 feet (0.88 m) along The Strip as a result of pumping from these aquifers.

=== Climate ===
The Las Vegas Valley lies in a relatively high-altitude portion of the Mojave Desert, with a subtropical hot-desert climate. The Valley generally averages less than 5 in (130 mm) of rain annually. Daily daytime summer temperatures in July and August typically range from 100 °F (38 °C) to 110 °F (43 °C), while nights generally range from 72 °F (22 °C) to 80 °F (27 °C). Very low humidity, however, tempers the effect of these temperatures, though dehydration, heat exhaustion, and sun stroke can occur after even a limited time outdoors in the summer. The interiors of automobiles often prove deadly to small children and pets during the summer and surfaces exposed to the sun can cause first- and second-degree burns to unprotected skin. July and August can also be marked by monsoon season, when moist winds from the Gulf of California soak much of the Southwestern United States. While not only raising humidity levels, these winds develop into dramatic desert thunderstorms that can sometimes cause flash flooding.

Winter days in metropolitan Las Vegas range from mild to quite chilly, and sunny most days; while winter itself is of short duration. Winter highs in December and January usually range from 52 °F (11 °C) to 60 °F (16 °C), while nighttime lows range from 34 °F (1 °C) to 42 °F (6 °C). The mountains surrounding the valley are snow-covered during the winter season, but snow accumulation in the metropolitan area itself is uncommon. Every few years apart, however, Las Vegas does get a small measurable snowfall.

Spring and fall are generally dry and with hot, sunny days and cool nights.

Climate data for Las Vegas, Nevada
Month	Jan	Feb	Mar	Apr	May	Jun	Jul	Aug	Sep	Oct	Nov	Dec	Year
Record high °F (°C)	80 (27)	89 (32)	96 (36)	102 (39)	114 (46)	117 (47)	120 (49)	116 (47)	114 (46)	103 (39)	89 (32)	91 (33)	120 (49)
Mean daily maximum °F (°C)	57.9 (14.4)	62.2 (16.8)	69.9 (21.1)	77.9 (25.5)	88.0 (31.1)	98.0 (36.7)	103.8 (39.9)	101.4 (38.6)	93.4 (34.1)	80.2 (26.8)	66.4 (19.1)	56.3 (13.5)	79.6 (26.4)
Mean daily minimum °F (°C)	37.1 (2.8)	41.0 (5.0)	46.8 (8.2)	53.3 (11.8)	63.2 (17.3)	71.7 (22.1)	77.8 (25.4)	76.3 (24.6)	68.0 (20.0)	56.0 (13.3)	44.3 (6.8)	36.6 (2.6)	56.0 (13.3)
Record low °F (°C)	8 (−13)	10 (−12)	16 (−9)	26 (−3)	28 (−2)	33 (1)	40 (4)	46 (8)	38 (3)	26 (−3)	14 (−10)	11 (−12)	8 (−13)
Average precipitation inches (mm)	0.61 (15)	0.68 (17)	0.60 (15)	0.16 (4.1)	0.25 (6.4)	0.08 (2.0)	0.43 (11)	0.46 (12)	0.31 (7.9)	0.25 (6.4)	0.33 (8.4)	0.40 (10)	4.56 (116)

=== Fault zones ===
The valley is an active earthquake zone crossed by multiple fault and thrust lines. These include the 20-mile (32 km) long Frenchman Mountain Fault capable of a magnitude 7 event, Whitney Mesa Fault, Cashman Fault, Valley View Fault, Decatur Fault, Eglington Fault and the West Charleston Fault.

=== Air quality ===
Having part of the region in a desert basin creates problems with air quality. From the dust the wind picks up, to the smog produced by vehicles, to the pollen in the air, the valley has several bad air days.

Pollen can be a major problem several weeks a year, with counts occasionally in the 70,000-plus range. Local governments are trying to control this by banning plants that produce the most pollen.

The dust problems usually happen on very windy days, so they tend to be short and seasonal. Full-fledged dust storms are rare.

Smog, on the other hand, gets worse when there is no wind to move the air out of the valley. Also, in winter it is possible for an inversion to form in the valley.

Since manufacturing is not a dominant industry of Las Vegas, and with Clark County working to control air quality problems, success has been shown over the years.

=== Water ===
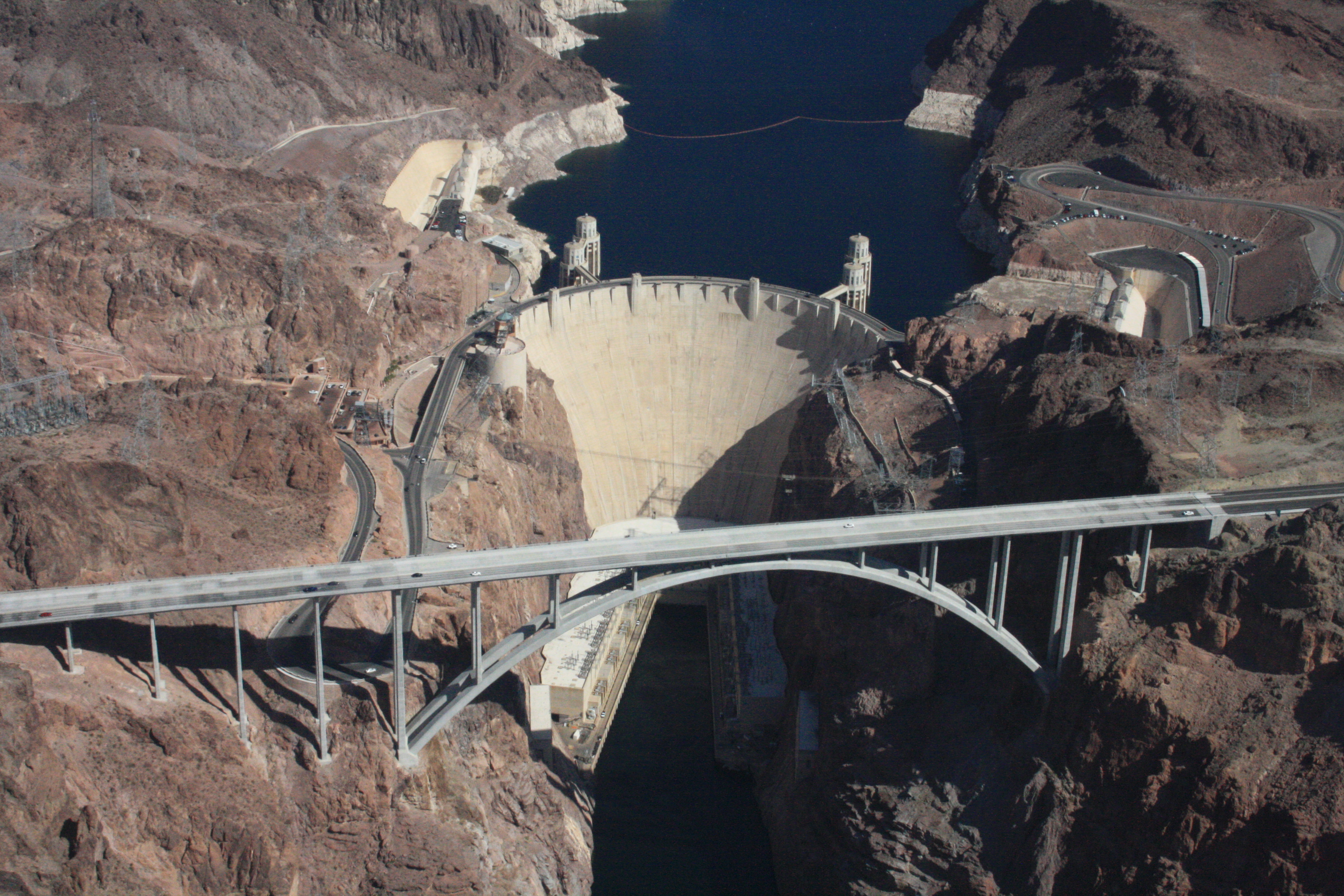
Lake Mead shown behind Hoover Dam on the Colorado River

The native flora does little to help the soil retain water. During the intense rains of monsoon season or (relatively) wet months of January and February, a network of dry natural channels, called washes or arroyos, carved into the valley floor allows water to flow down from the mountains and converge in the Las Vegas Wash which runs through the Clark County Wetlands Park. The wash system used to form a large natural wetlands which then flowed into the Colorado River, until the construction of Hoover Dam on the Colorado River led to the creation of Lake Mead. Further development in the 1980s and 1990s made Lake Las Vegas, which required directing the Las Vegas Wash into tunnels which run under Lake Las Vegas and into Lake Mead.

Nevada receives an allocation 300,000 acre-feet (370,000,000 m^{3}) of water each year from Lake Mead, with credits for water it returns to the lake. The allocations were made with the Colorado River Compact when Nevada had a much smaller population and very little agriculture. The allocations were also made during a wet string of years, which overstated the available water in the entire watershed. As a result, precipitation that is below normal for a few years can significantly affect the Colorado River reservoirs. The Las Vegas area uses most of this allocation with Laughlin, Nevada using most of the remaining allocation. In June 2007, the price of a cubic meter was 57 cents in Las Vegas. Las Vegas gets around 90 percent of its water from Lake Mead.

Early Vegas depended on the aquifer which fed the flowing springs supporting the meadows that gave the area its name, but the pumping of water from these caused a large drop in the water levels and ground subsidence over wide areas of the valley. Today, the aquifers are basically used to store water that is pumped from the lake during periods of low demand and pumped out during periods of high demand.

=== Urbanization ===
The population doubling time in the greater metropolitan area was under ten years, since the early 1970s and the Las Vegas metropolitan area now has a population approaching three million people. This rapid population growth led to a significant urbanization of desert lands into industrial and commercial areas (see suburbia).

== Economy ==
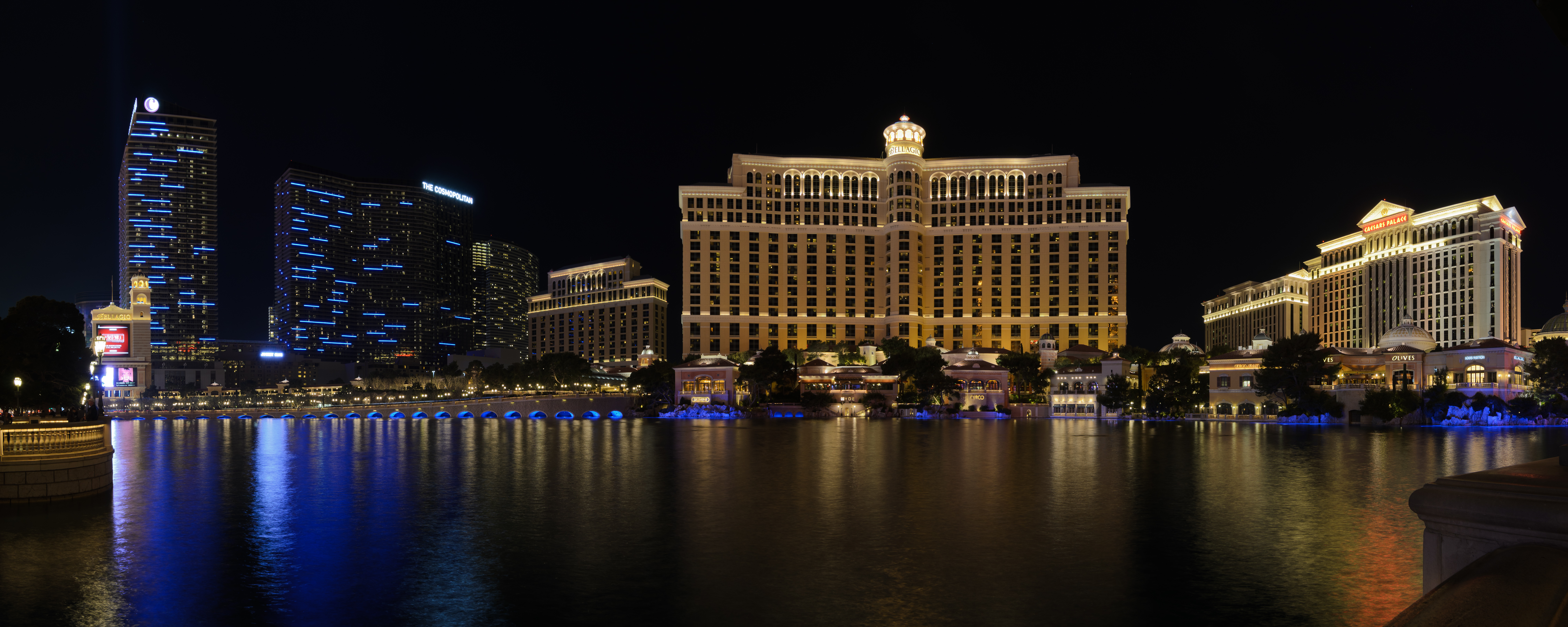
Four-segment panorama of the Cosmopolitan, Bellagio, and Caesars Palace (left to right) from the Las Vegas Strip, across from the Bellagio fountains.

The driving economic force in Las Vegas is the tourism industry. The area has about 150,000 hotel rooms, more than any other city in the world. In the past, casinos and celebrity shows were the two major attractions for the area. Now shopping, conventions, fine dining, and outdoor parks are the main sights for attracting tourists.

Las Vegas serves as world headquarters for the world's largest Fortune 500 gaming company, MGM Resorts International. Several companies involved in the manufacture of electronic gaming machines, such as slot machines, are located in the Las Vegas area. In the first decade of the 21st century, shopping and dining have become attractions of their own. Tourism marketing and promotion are handled by the Las Vegas Convention and Visitors Authority, a county-wide agency. Its annual Visitors Survey provides detailed information on visitor numbers, spending patterns, and resulting revenues.

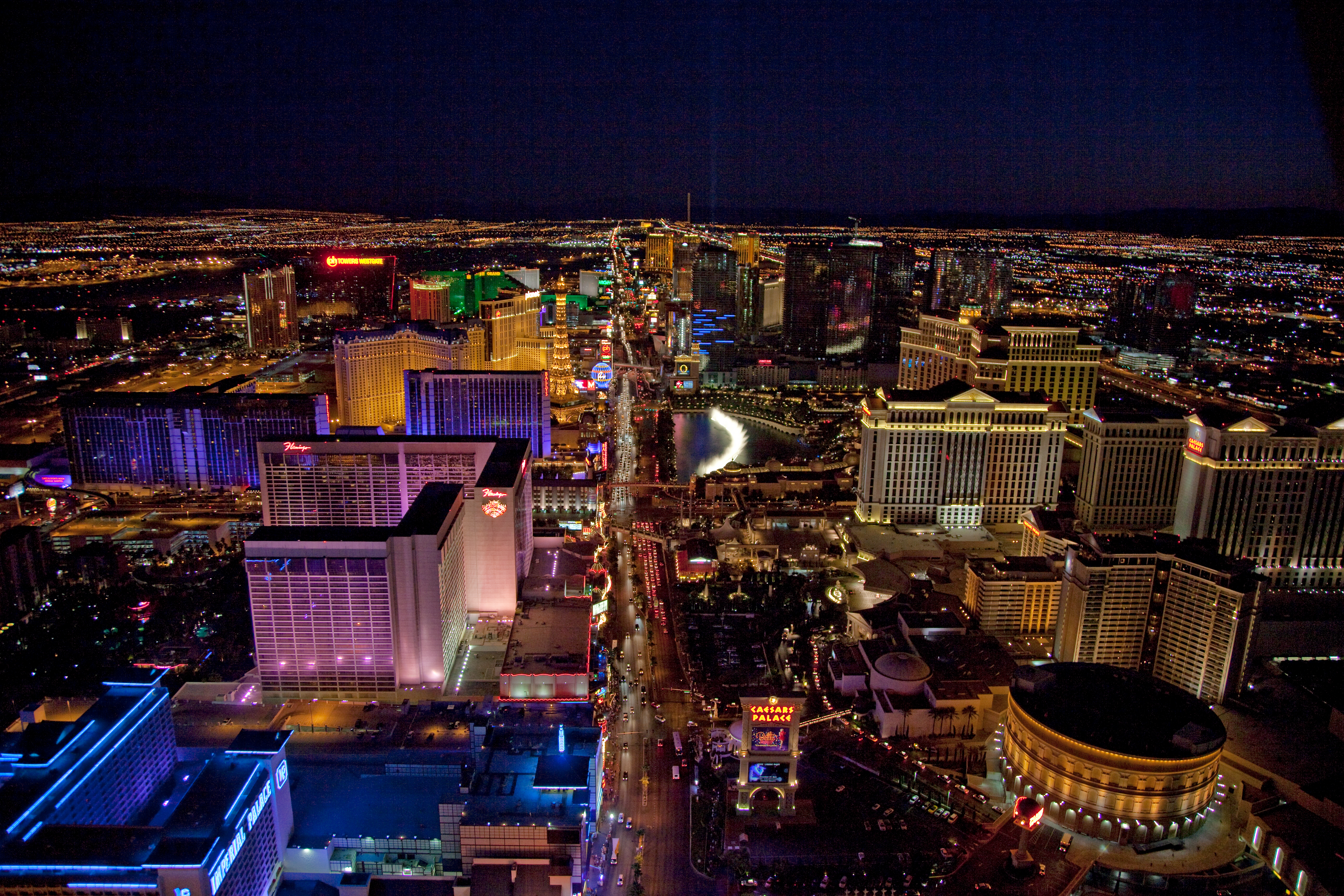
The Las Vegas Strip looking south at night

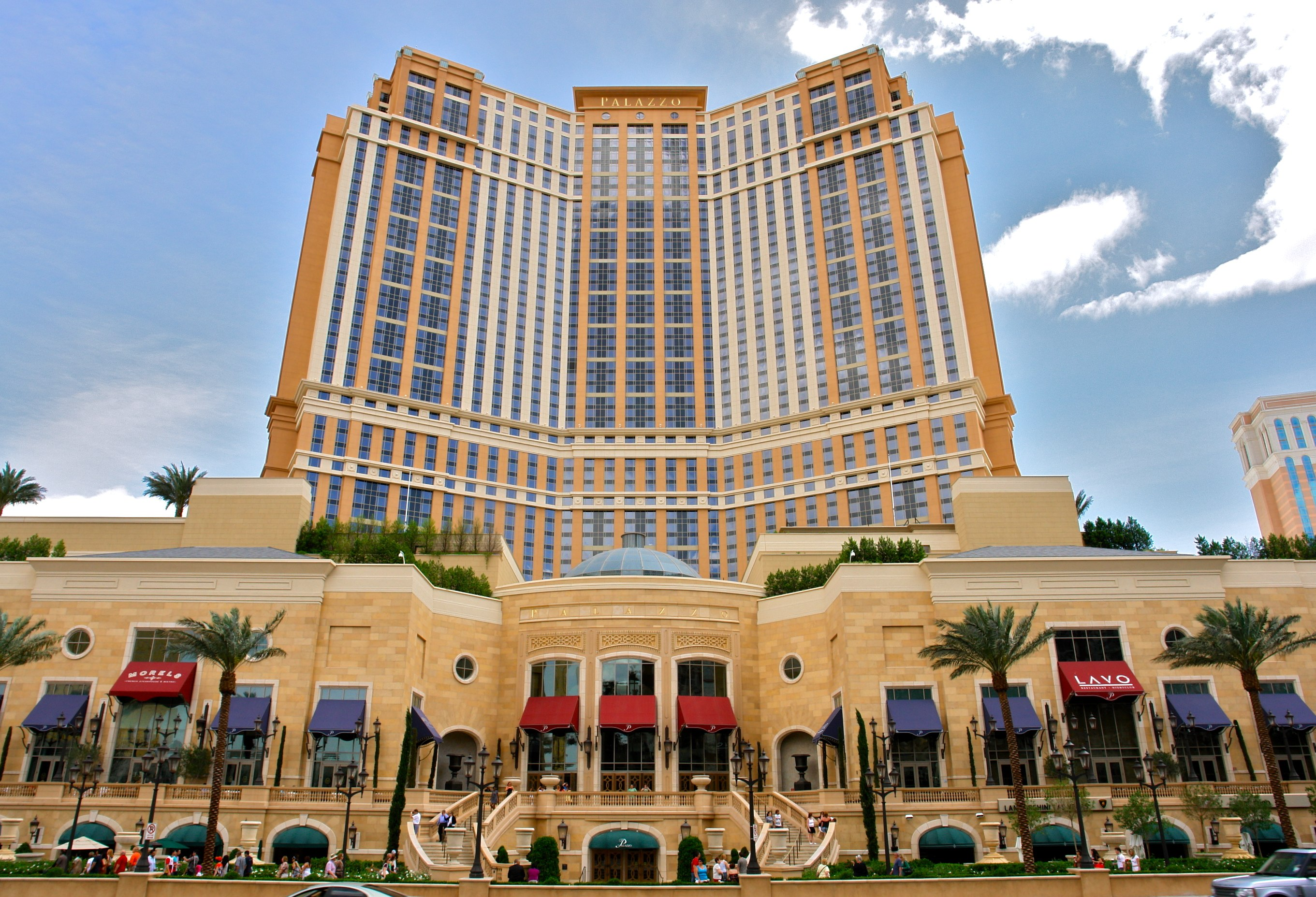
Exterior of the Palazzo hotel. A major part of the city economy is based on tourism including gambling and ultra-luxury hotels.

While Las Vegas has historically attracted high-stake gamblers from around the world, it is now facing tougher competition from the UK, Hong Kong and Macau (China), Eastern Europe and developing areas in the Middle East.

Las Vegas has recently enjoyed a boom in population and tourism. The urban area has grown outward so quickly that it borders Bureau of Land Management holdings along its edges. This has led to an increase in land values such that medium- and high-density development is occurring closer to the core. The Chinatown of Las Vegas was constructed in the early 1990s on Spring Mountain Road. Chinatown initially consisted of only one large shopping center complex, but the area was expanded with shopping centers that contain various Asian businesses. Over the past few years, retirees have been moving to the metro area, driving businesses that support them from housing to health care.

Though the cost of housing went up over 40% in 2004, the lack of business and income taxes still makes Nevada a place for companies to relocate to or expand existing operations. Being a twenty-four-hour city, call centers use Las Vegas a place to hire workers who are accustomed to working at all hours.

The construction industry accounts for a share of the economy in Las Vegas. Hotel casinos planned for the Strip can take years to build and employ thousands of workers. Developers discovered that there was demand for high-end condominiums. By 2005, more than 100 condominium buildings were in various stages of development, however, in 2008, the construction industry went into a downturn due to the Great Recession, though the industry has since seen a rebound.

In 2000, more than 21,000 new homes and 26,000 resale homes were purchased. In early 2005, there were 20 residential development projects of more than 300 acres (120 ha) each underway. During that same period, Las Vegas was regarded as the fastest-growing community in the United States.

Other promising residential and office developments have begun construction around Downtown Las Vegas. New condominium and high-rise hotel projects have changed the Las Vegas skyline dramatically in recent years. Many large high-rise projects are planned for Downtown Las Vegas, as well as the Las Vegas Strip.

=== Construction ===
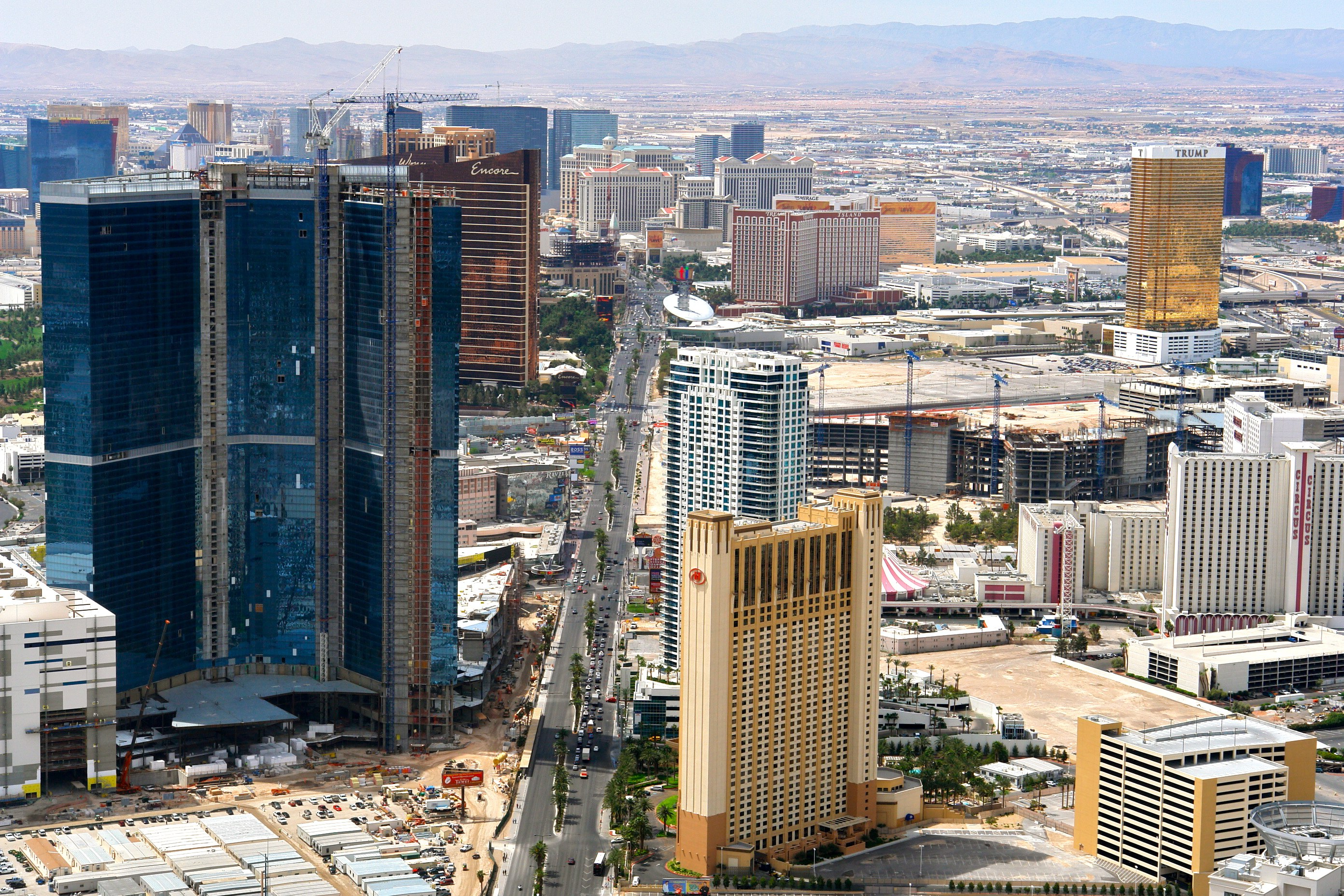
Construction on The Strip (2009)

Construction in Las Vegas is a major industry and quickly growing with the population. In March 2011, construction employed 40,700 people and is expected to grow with the recovering economy. Since the mega resorts that define Las Vegas today began going up in the early 1970s, construction has played a vital role in both commercial and non commercial developments. At any given time there are 300 new homes being constructed in Las Vegas. New suburban master planned communities are also becoming common in Las Vegas ever since The Howard Hughes Corporation began work on Summerlin, an upper-class community on the west side of the valley.

The massive CityCenter project, by MGM Mirage, broke ground on the Strip in 2006. It put a massive strain on the construction ability and workforce of the area due to number of laborers and amount of materials required. Because of this, prices of almost any construction project in Las Vegas doubled. The project was completed in 2009 and includes multiple hotels and condominiums, as well as shopping and a casino. At a cost of $8.5 billion, it is the most expensive privately funded construction project in U.S. history.

The Tropicana Hotel, opened in 1957, was demolished in October 2024 in order to create a new baseball stadium. Bally's Corporation, the owner of the hotel, indicated that upon completion of the stadium it would further develop the site.

=== Housing ===
Traditionally, housing consisted primarily of single-family detached homes. Slab-on-grade foundations are the common base for residential buildings in the valley. Apartments generally were two-story buildings. Until the 1990s, there were exceptions, but they were few and far between. In the 1990s, Turnberry Associates constructed the first high rise condominium towers. Prior to this, there were only a handful of mid-rise multi-family buildings. By the mid-2000s, there was a major move into high rise condominiums towers, which affected the region's skyline around the Strip.

The Las Vegas Valley is home to various suburban master planned communities that include extensive recreational amenities such as lakes, golf courses, parks, bike paths and jogging trails. Planned communities in the valley include Aliante, Anthem, Cadence, Centennial Hills, Green Valley, Inspirada, Lake Las Vegas, The Lakes, Mountain's Edge, Peccole Ranch, Providence, Rhodes Ranch, Seven Hills, Skye Canyon, Southern Highlands, and Summerlin.

=== Technology companies ===
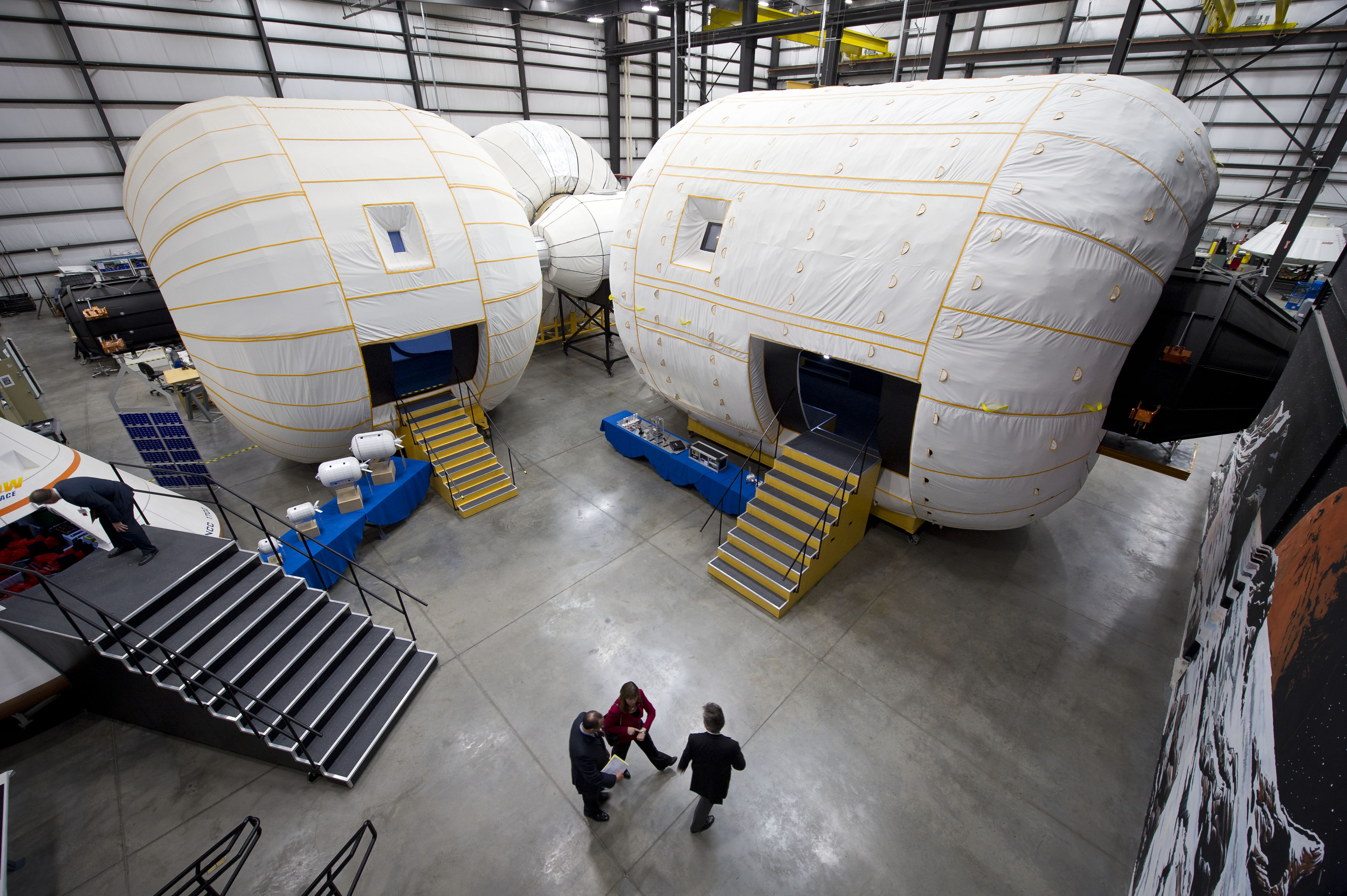
A full-scale mockup of Bigelow Aerospace's Space Station Alpha inside their facility in North Las Vegas

Some technology companies have either relocated to Las Vegas or were created there. For various reasons, Las Vegas has had a high concentration of technology companies in electronic gaming and telecommunications industries.

Some current technology companies in southern Nevada include: Bigelow Aerospace, Petroglyph, Switch Communications, US Support LLC, Fanatics, and Zappos.

In 2015, Electric vehicle startup Faraday Future has chosen North Las Vegas's Apex Industrial Park for its $1 billion car factory.

Companies that originally were formed in the Las Vegas region, but have since sold or relocated include Westwood Studios (sold to Electronic Arts), Systems Research & Development (Sold to IBM), Yellowpages.com (Sold to BellSouth and SBC), and MPower Communications.

=== Tourism ===
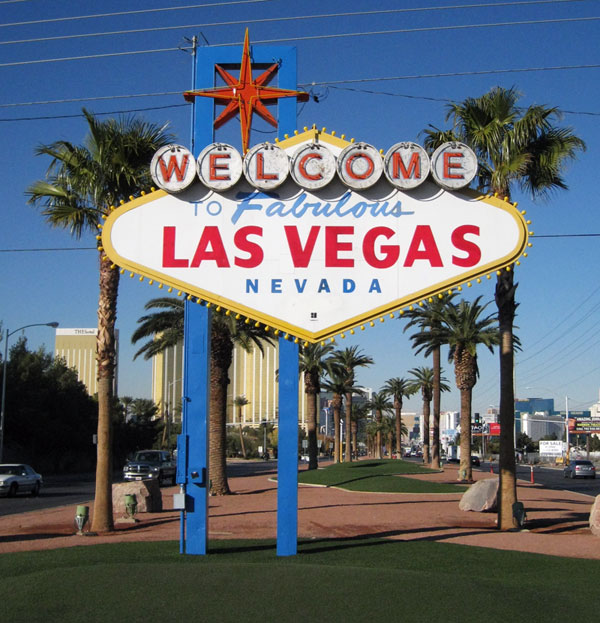
The Welcome to Fabulous Las Vegas sign

The major attractions in the Las Vegas Valley are the hotel/casinos. These hotels generally consist of large gambling areas, theaters for live performances, shopping, bars/clubs, and several restaurants and cafes. According to the city government, about 41.7 million people visit Las Vegas annually. There are clusters of large hotel/casinos located in both downtown Las Vegas and on the Las Vegas Strip. The largest hotels are mainly located on the Strip, which is a four-mile section of Las Vegas Boulevard. These hotels provide thousands of rooms of various sizes. Fifteen of the world's 30 largest hotels by room count are on the Strip, with a total of over 62,000 rooms. There are many hotel/casinos in the city's downtown area as well, which was the original focal point of the Valley's gaming industry. Several hotel/casinos ranging from large to small are also located around the city and metro area. Many of the largest hotel, casino, and resort properties in the world are located on the Las Vegas Strip.

The valley's casinos can be grouped into several locations. The largest is the Las Vegas Strip, followed by Downtown Las Vegas, and then the smaller Boulder Strip. There are also several one-off single standing hotel/casinos dotted around the valley and the metro area.

In 2011, the majority of tourists arrived from the western states (55%) with 31% from California alone. Approximately 16% of tourists arrived from outside North America.

=== Shopping ===
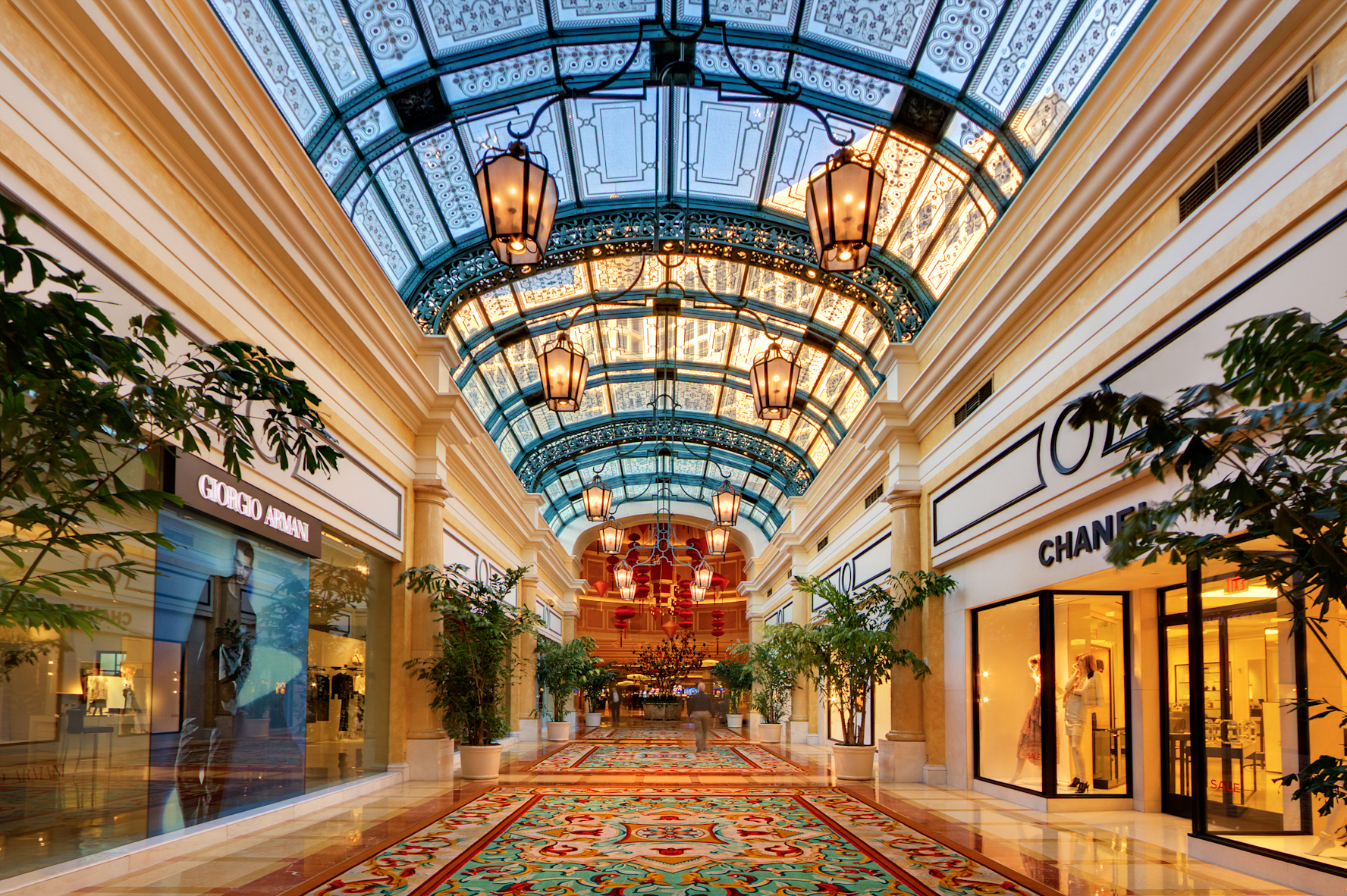
Chanel and Giorgio Armani boutiques at Via Bellagio

Las Vegas has expanded its attractiveness to visitors by offering both affordable and high-end merchandise in many shops and shopping malls. Many hotels on the Las Vegas Strip also have adjacent shopping malls, giving the Las Vegas area the highest concentration of shopping malls in any four mile stretch of road. In addition to the malls on the Strip, there are several outlying malls in the City of Las Vegas, Henderson, and the surrounding area. The monorail, lying somewhat east of the Strip, facilitates north–south travel, including stations at several casinos and the Las Vegas Convention Center.

Major shopping attractions include:

- Bonanza Gift Shop
- The Boulevard Mall
- Broadacres Marketplace (Note: An outdoor swap meet located in North Las Vegas, opened as Broadacres Swap Meet in 1977.)
- The Shops at Crystals
- Downtown Summerlin
- Galleria at Sunset
- Grand Canal Shoppes
- Fantastic Indoor Swap Meet (Note: Opened in 1991, in the former Fantastik Furniture store, which originated as the Vegas Village shopping center in the 1960s. It has more than 500 vendor booths.)
- Fashion Show Mall
- The Forum Shops at Caesars
- Las Vegas Premium Outlets
- Meadows Mall
- Miracle Mile Shops
- Stratosphere Tower Shops
- Tivoli Village
- Town Square

=== Conventions ===
Las Vegas holds many of the world's largest conventions each year, including CES, SEMA, and Conexpo. The Las Vegas Convention Center is one of the largest in the world with 1,940,631 sq ft (180,290.5 m^{2}) of exhibit space. These events bring in an estimated $7.4 billion of revenue to the city each year, and host over 5 million attendees.

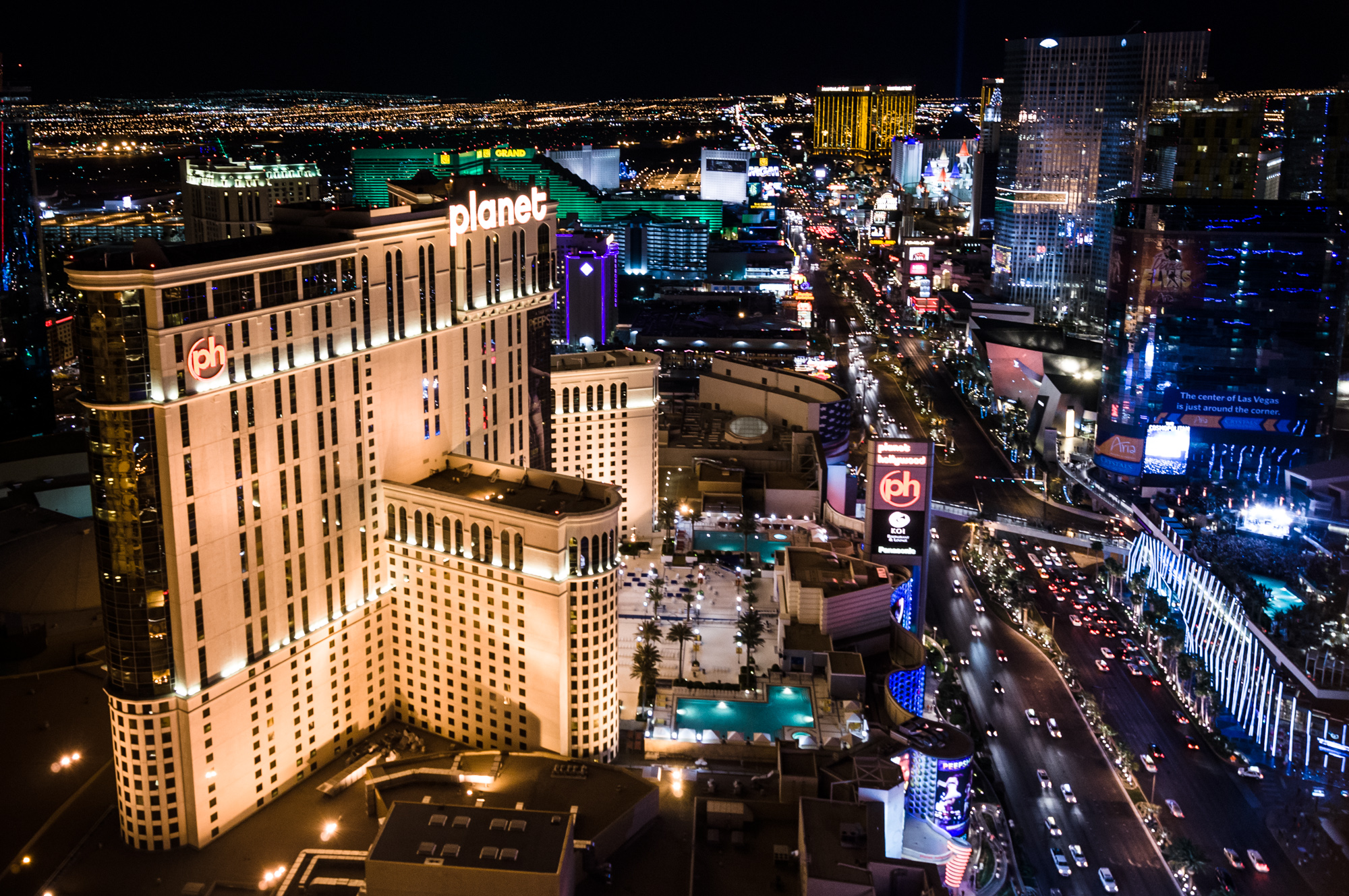
Las Vegas Boulevard facing south and Planet Hollywood Las Vegas

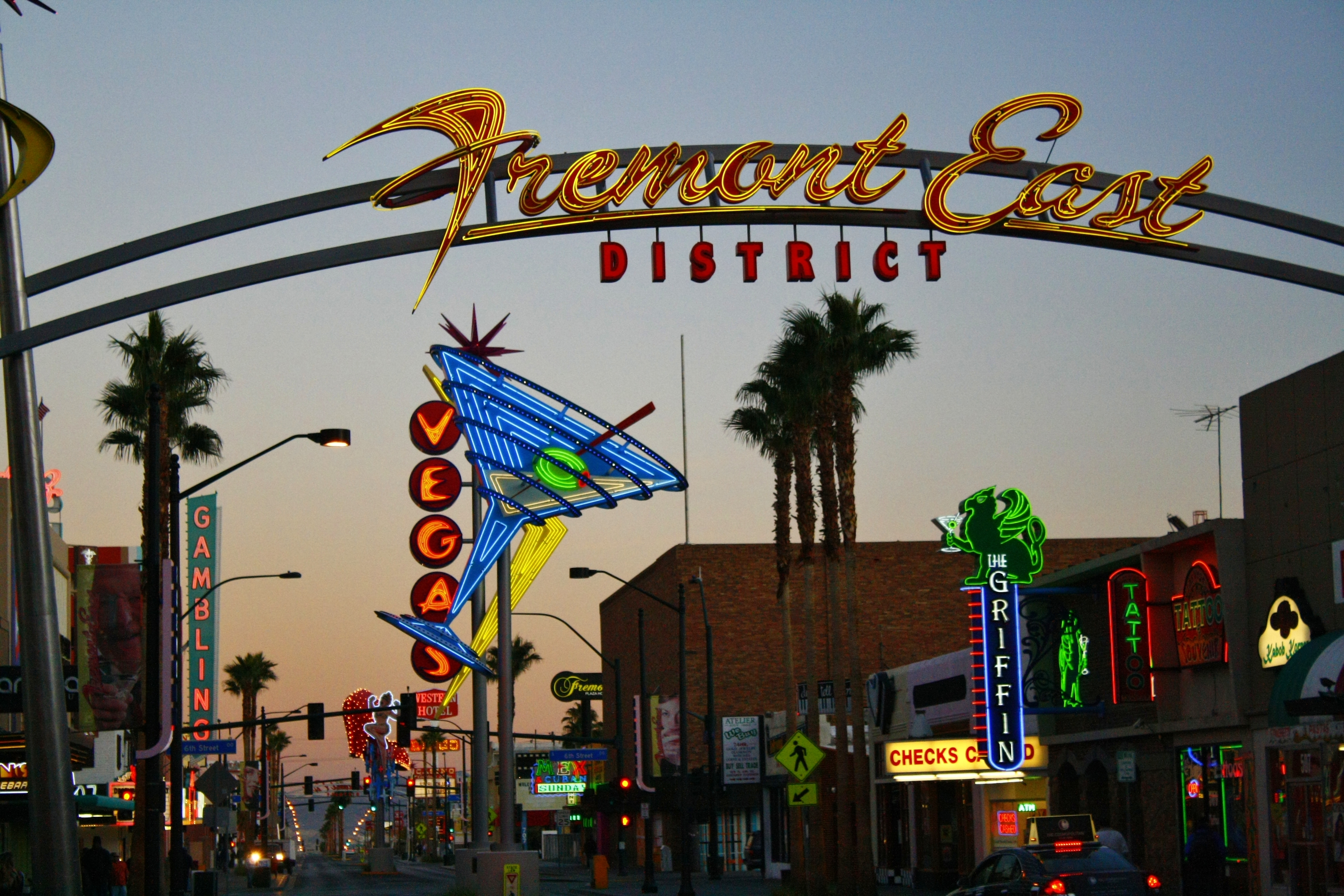
Fremont East

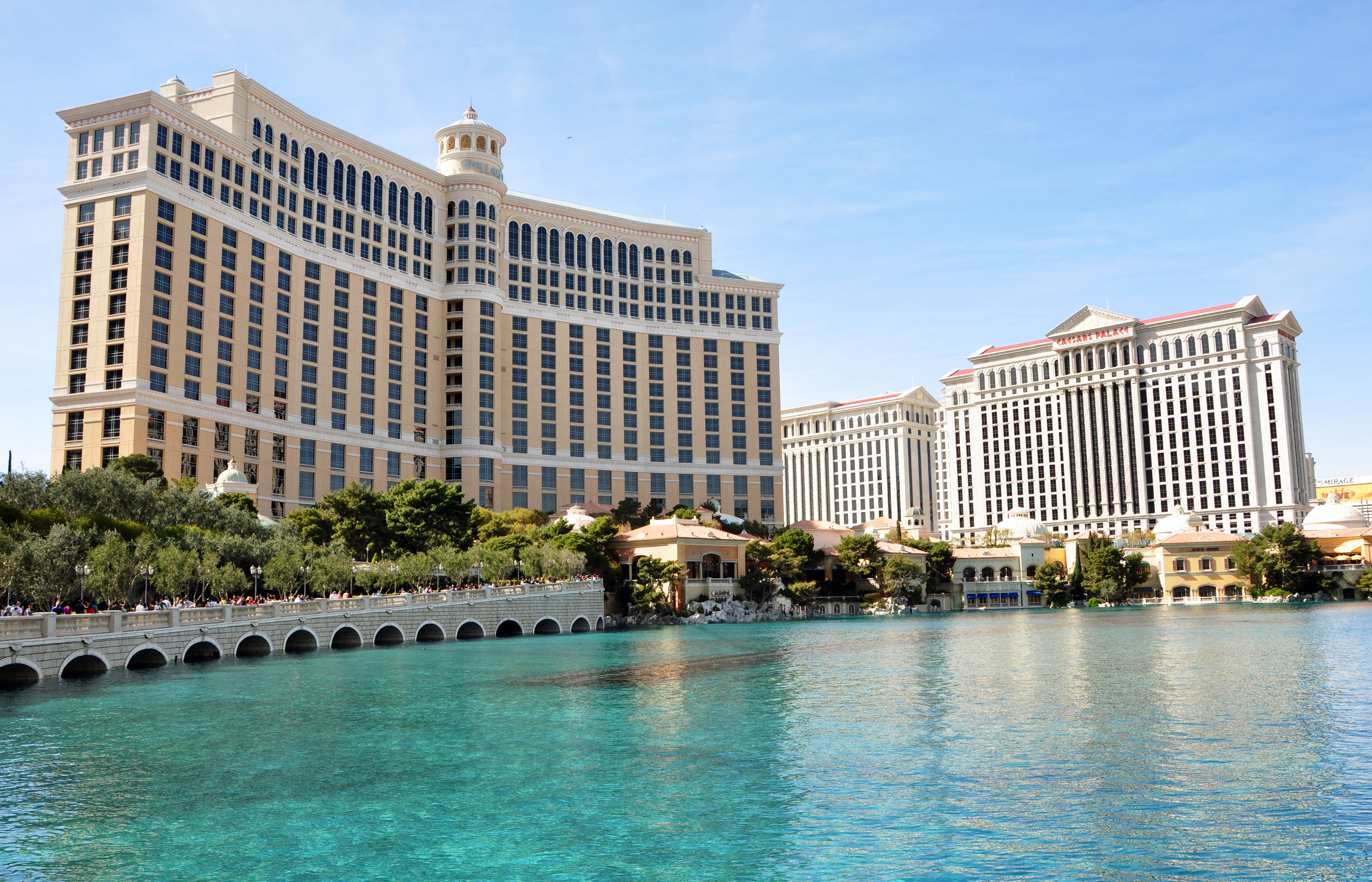
The Bellagio (left) and Caesars Palace (right)

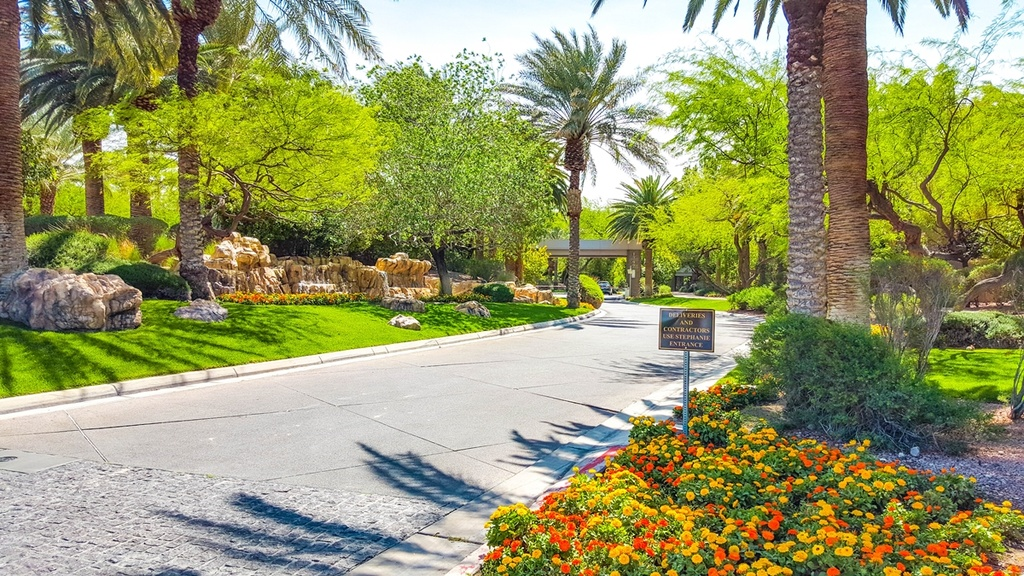
MacDonald Highlands, one of many affluent neighborhoods in the valley

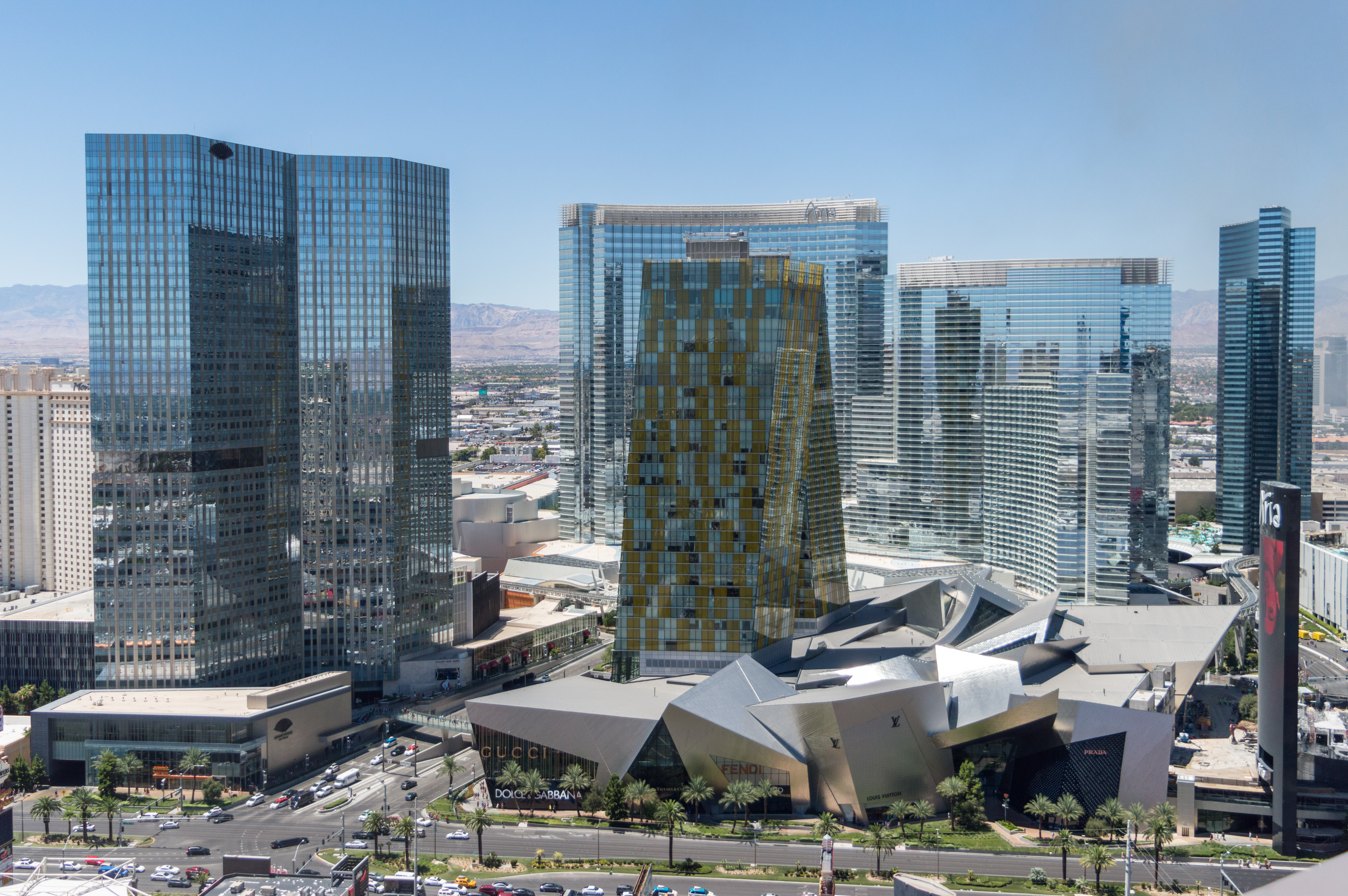
CityCenter complex

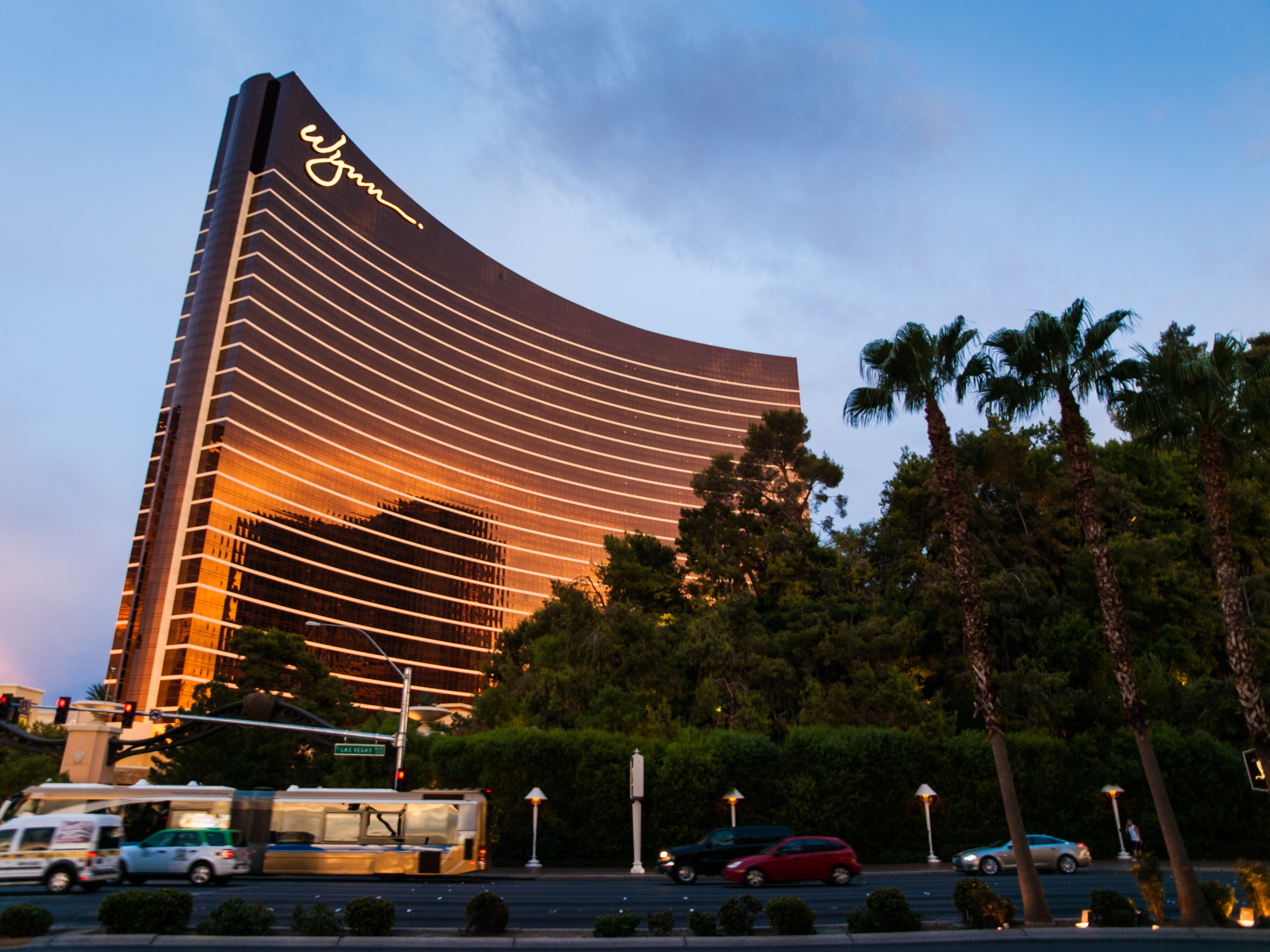
Wynn Las Vegas

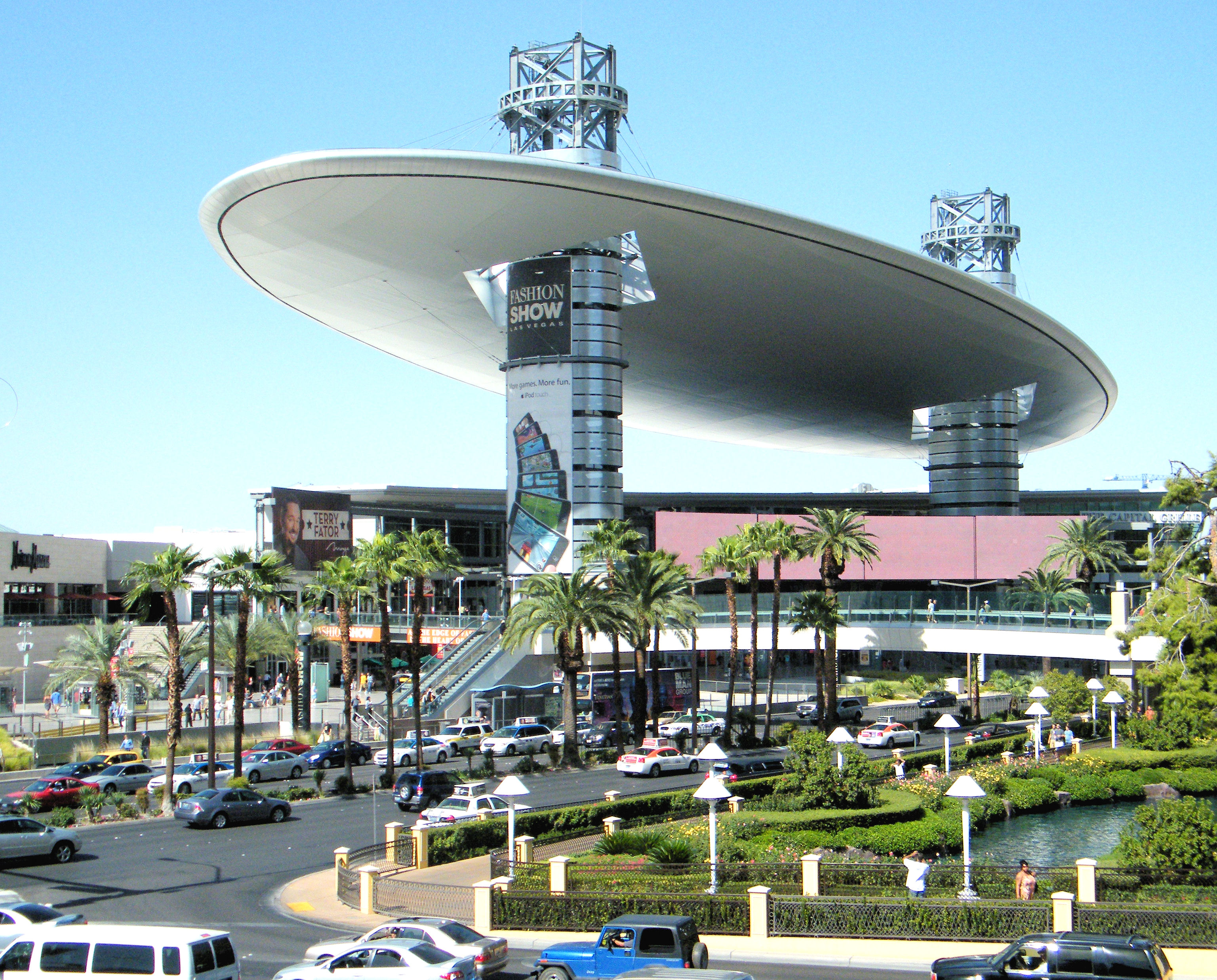
The Fashion Show Mall

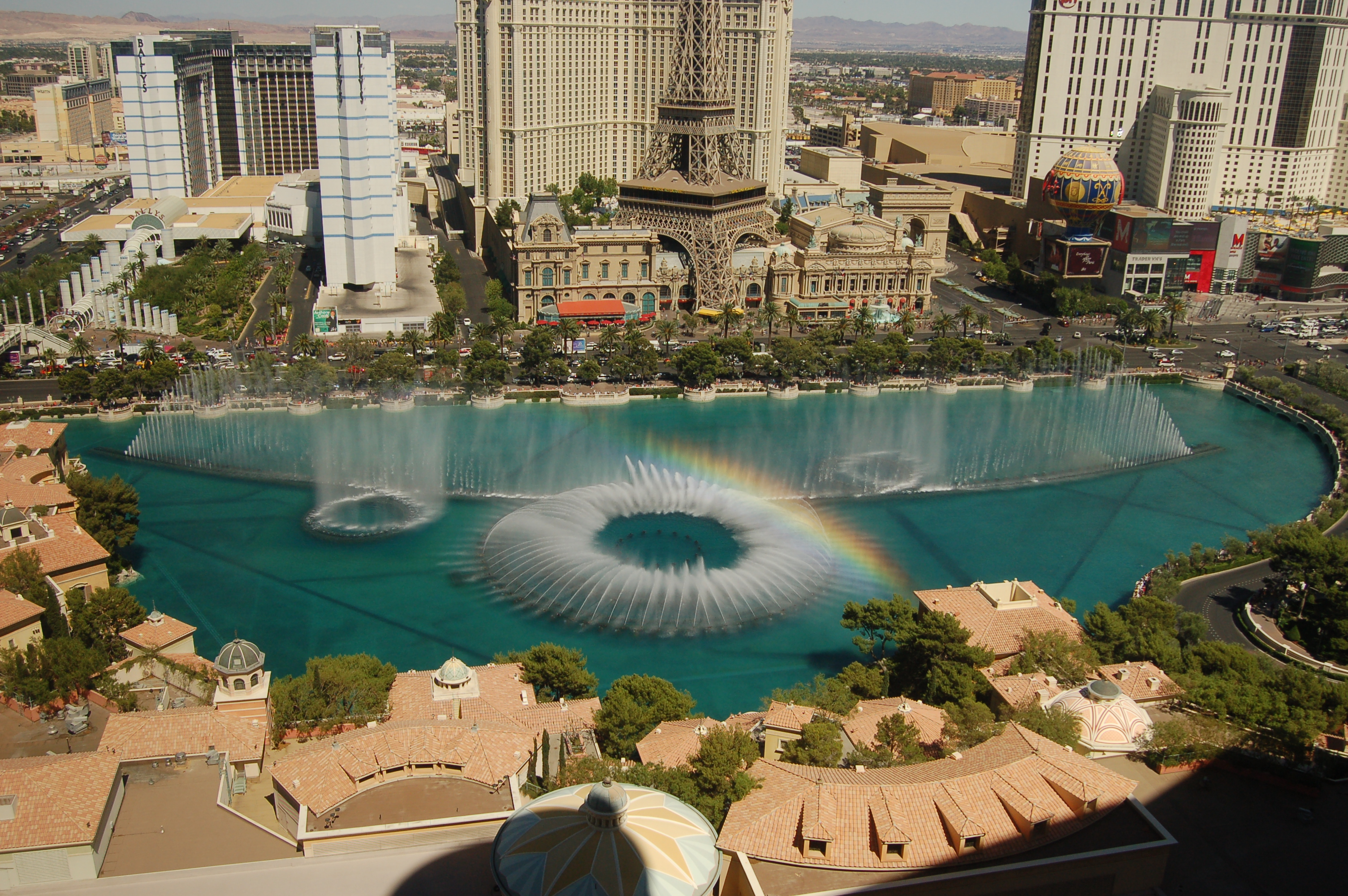
Fountains of Bellagio

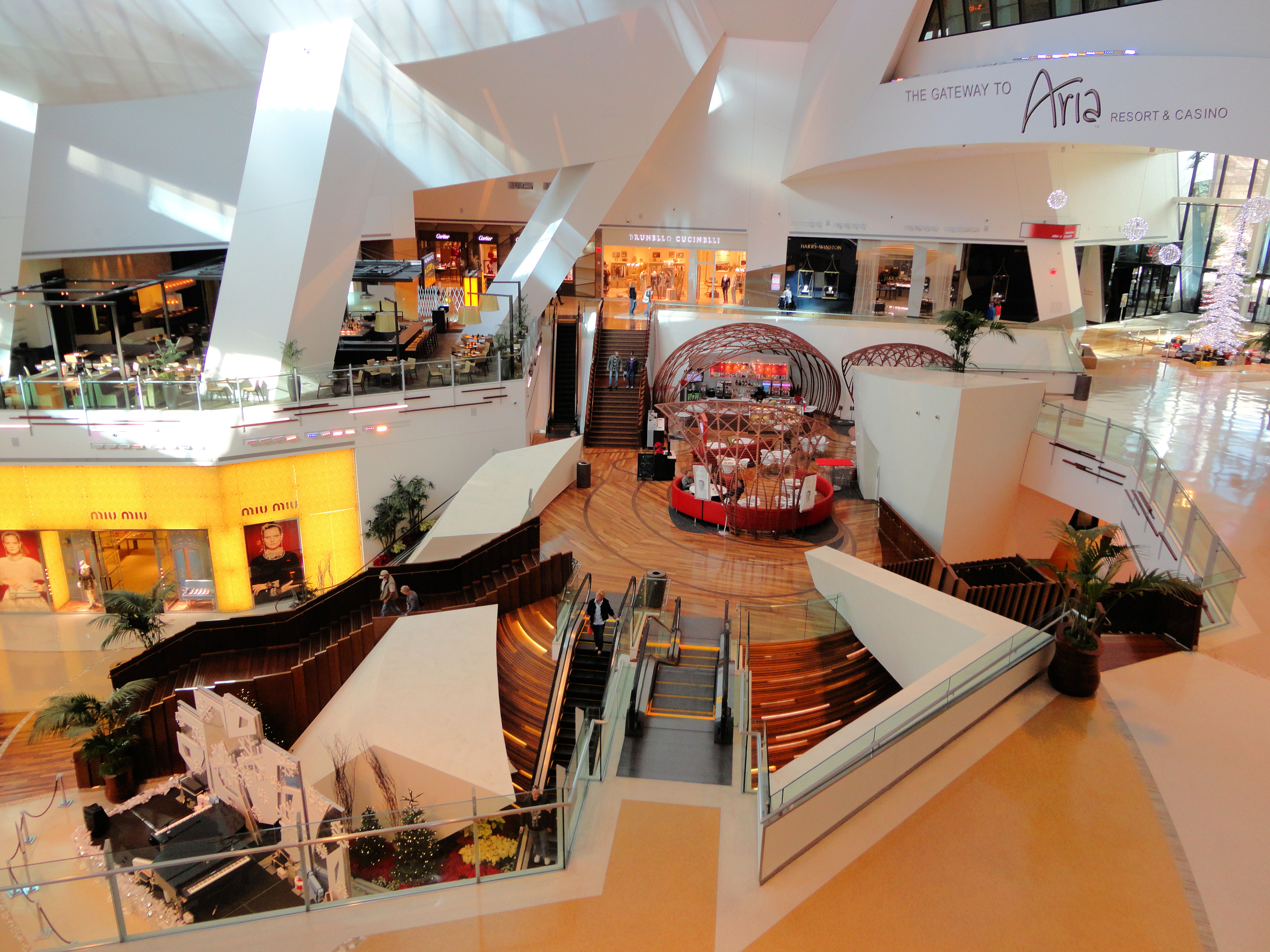
Crystals at CityCenter

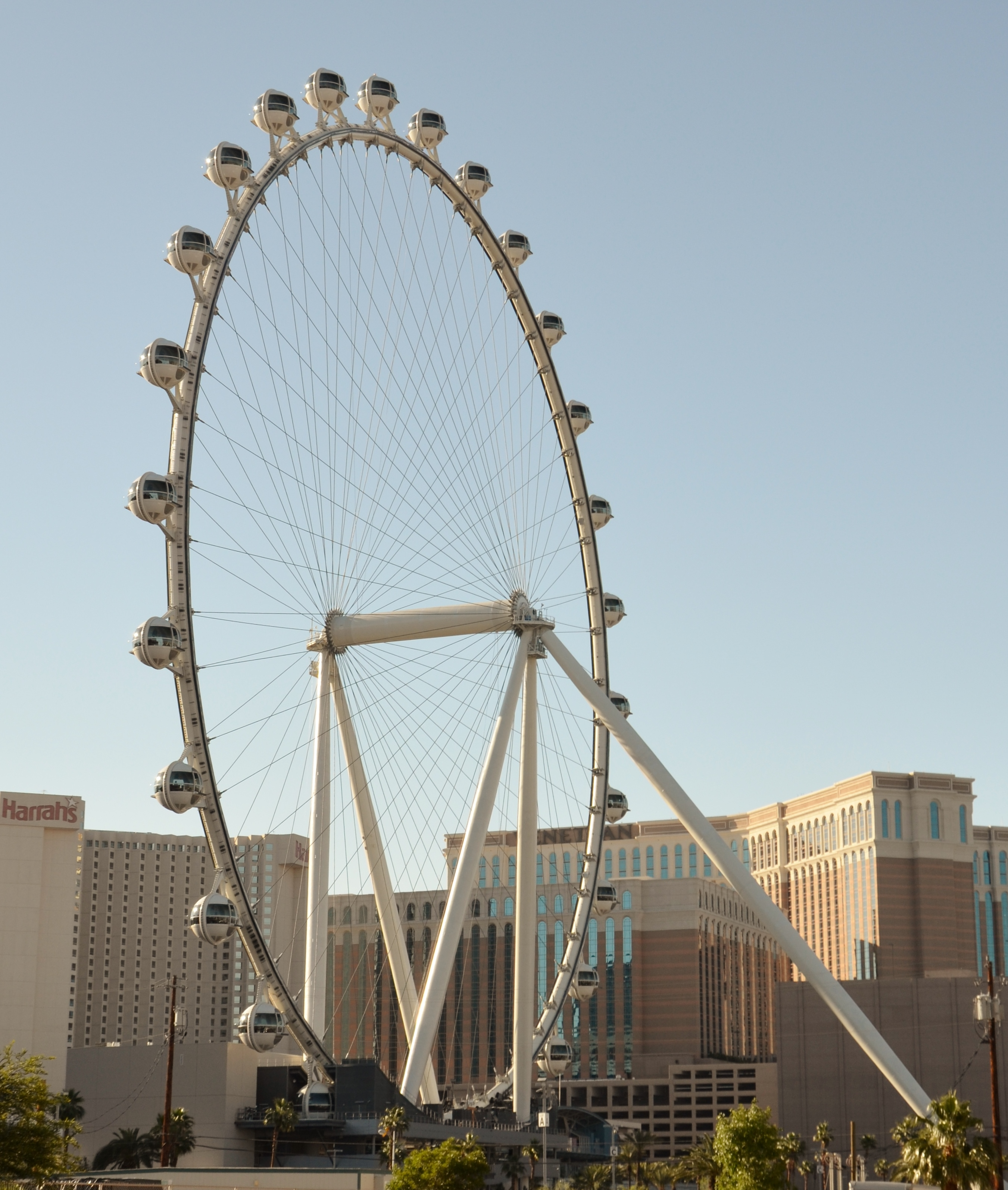
High Roller

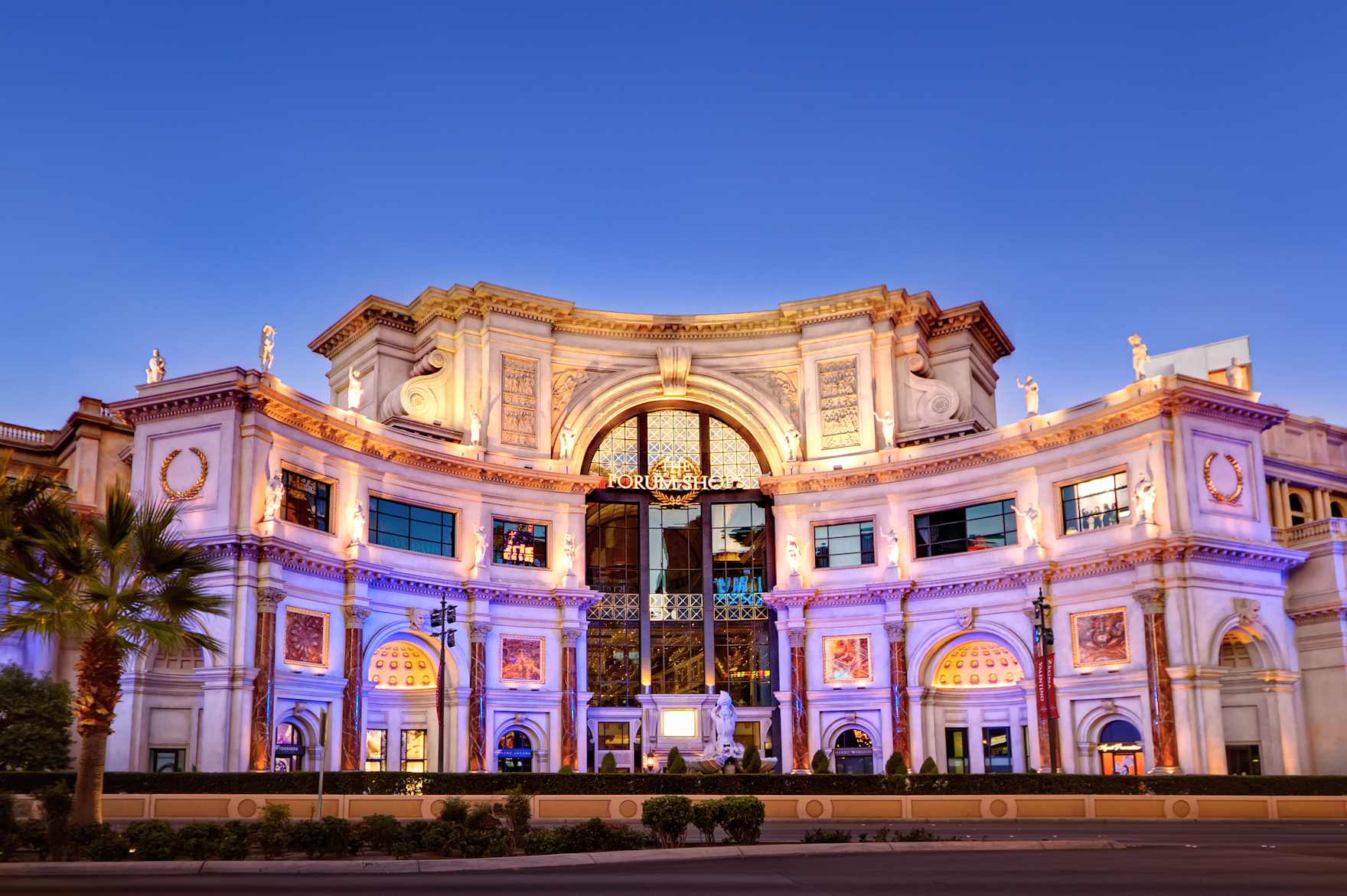
The Forum Shops at Caesars

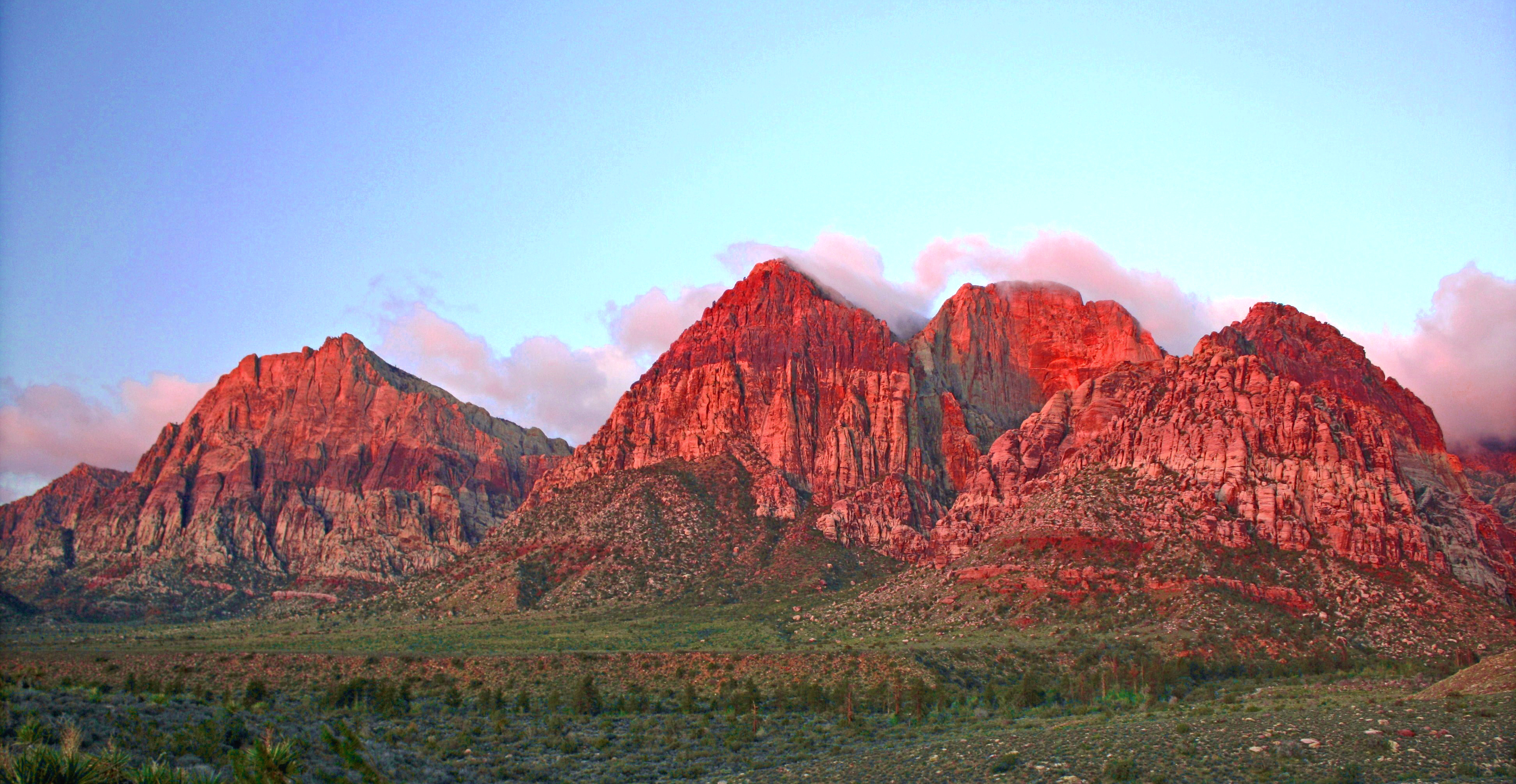
Red Rock Canyon National Conservation Area

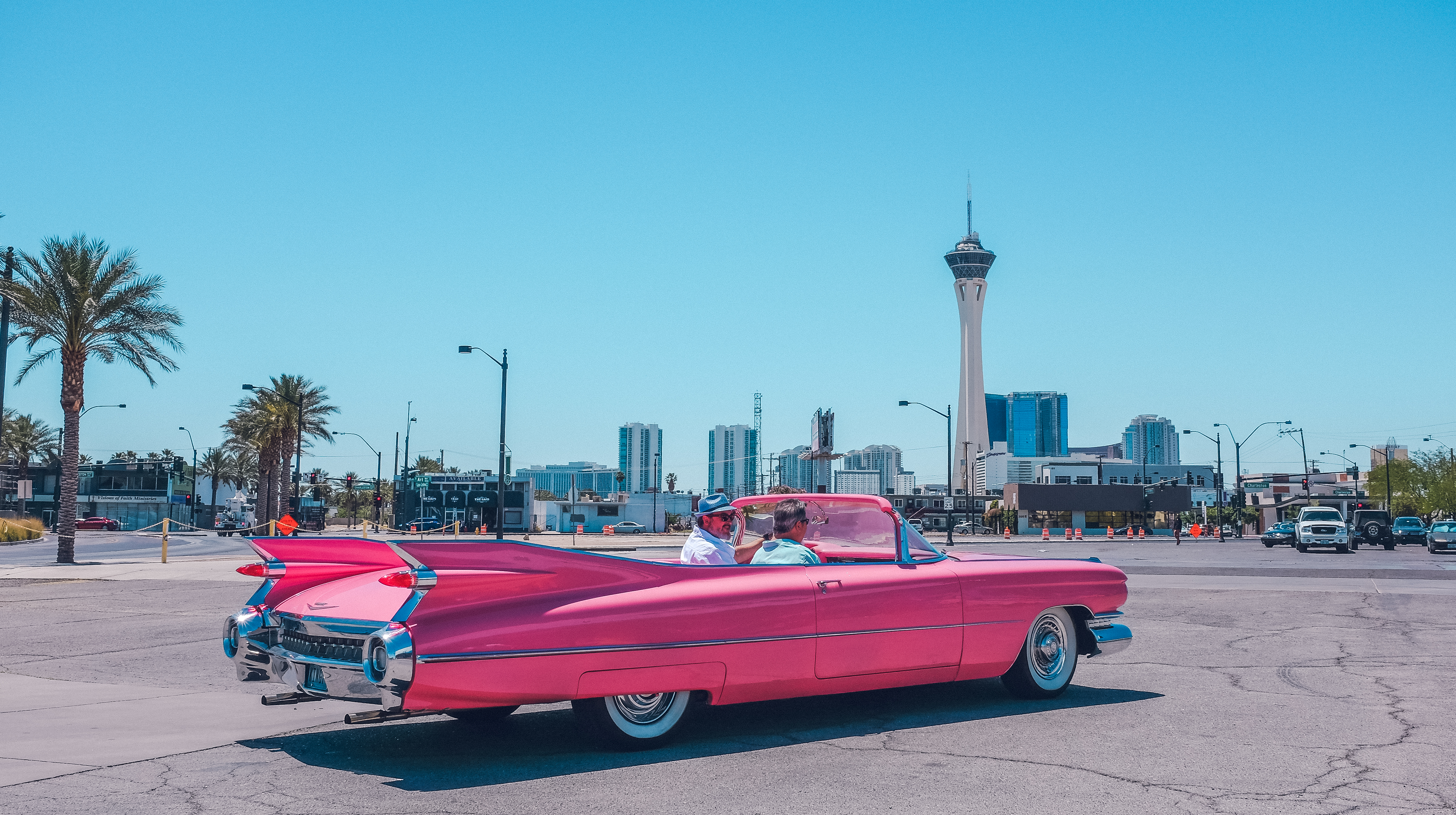
Las Vegas Arts District

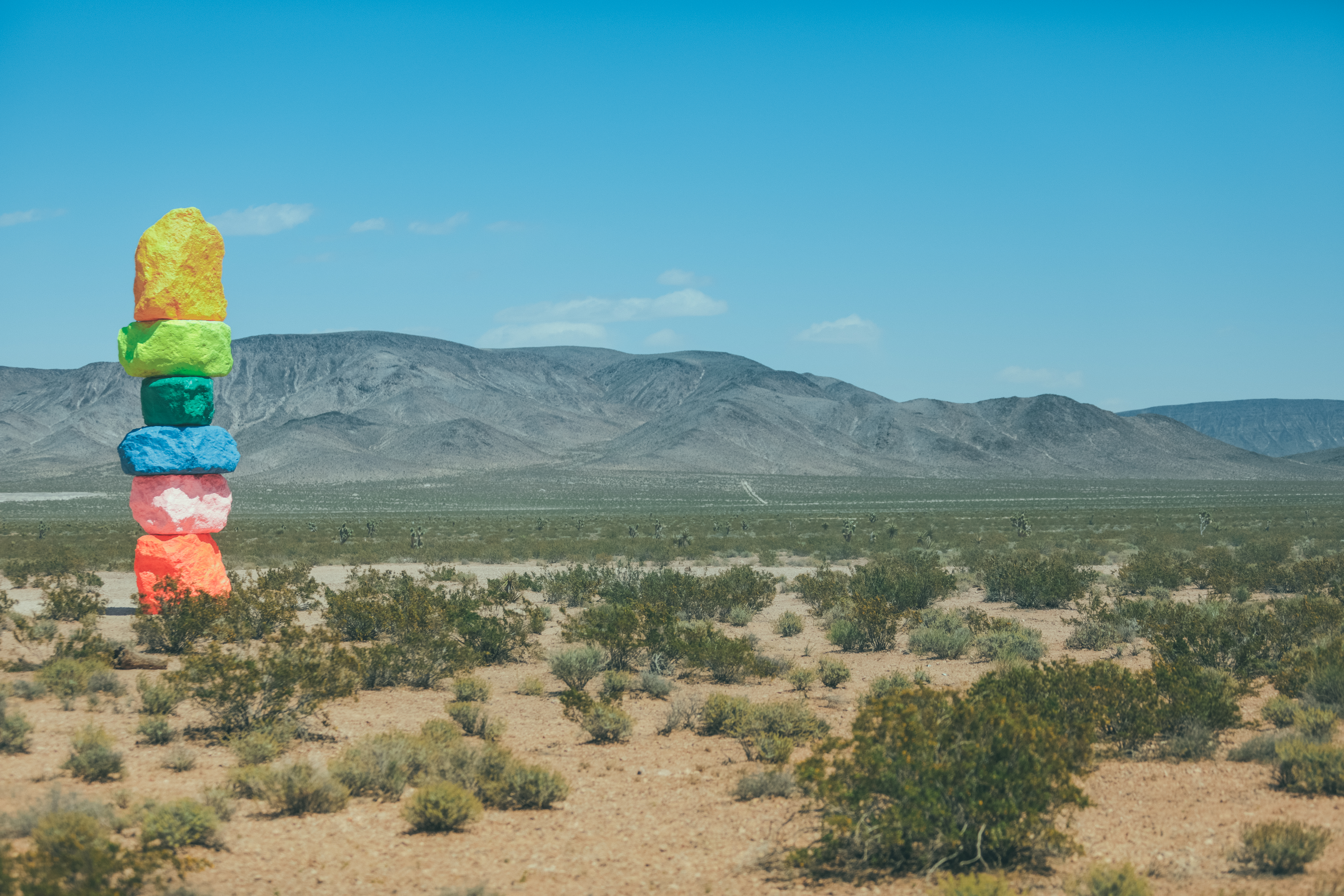
Seven Magic Mountains

== Culture and the arts ==
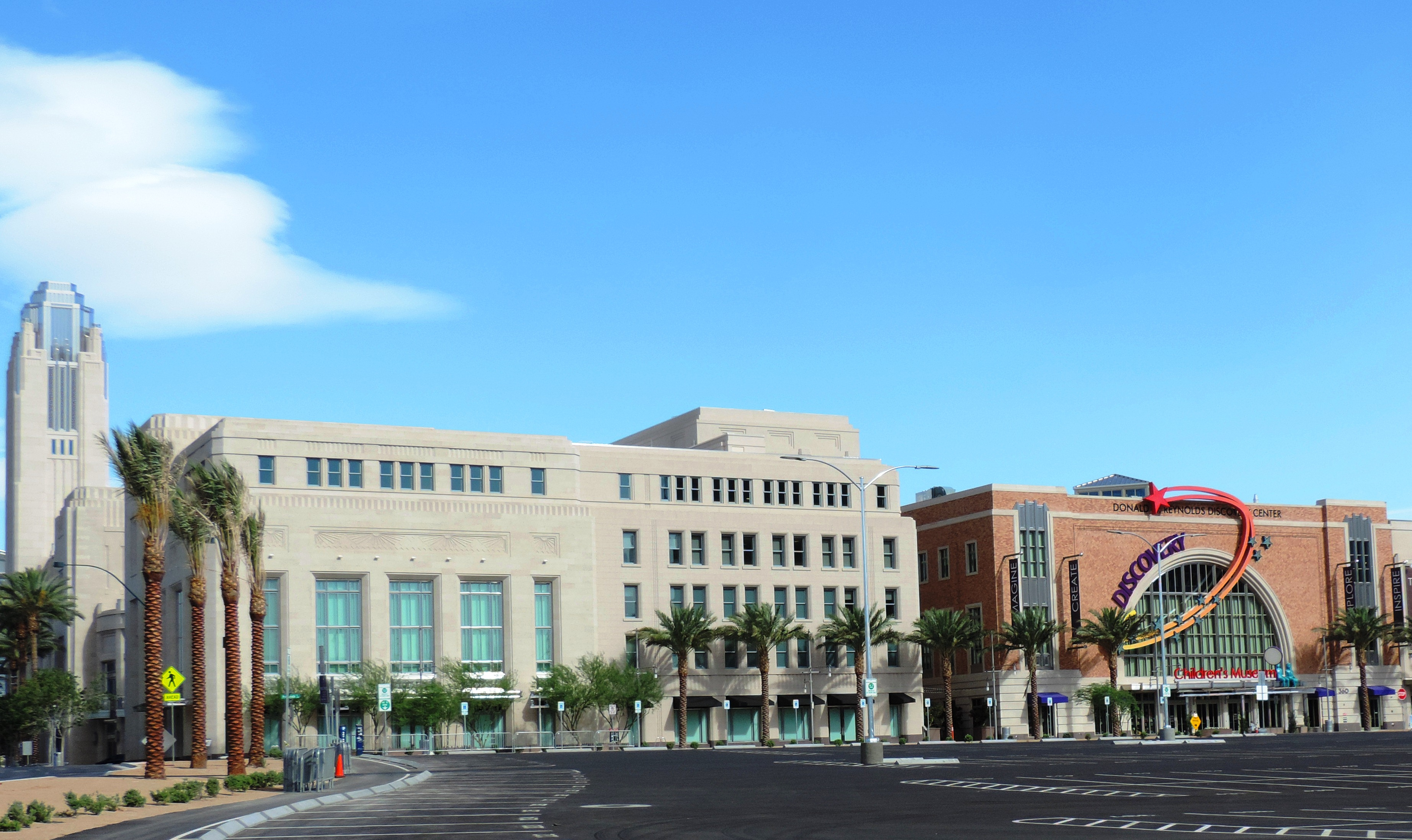
The Smith Center for the Performing Arts located in downtown Las Vegas

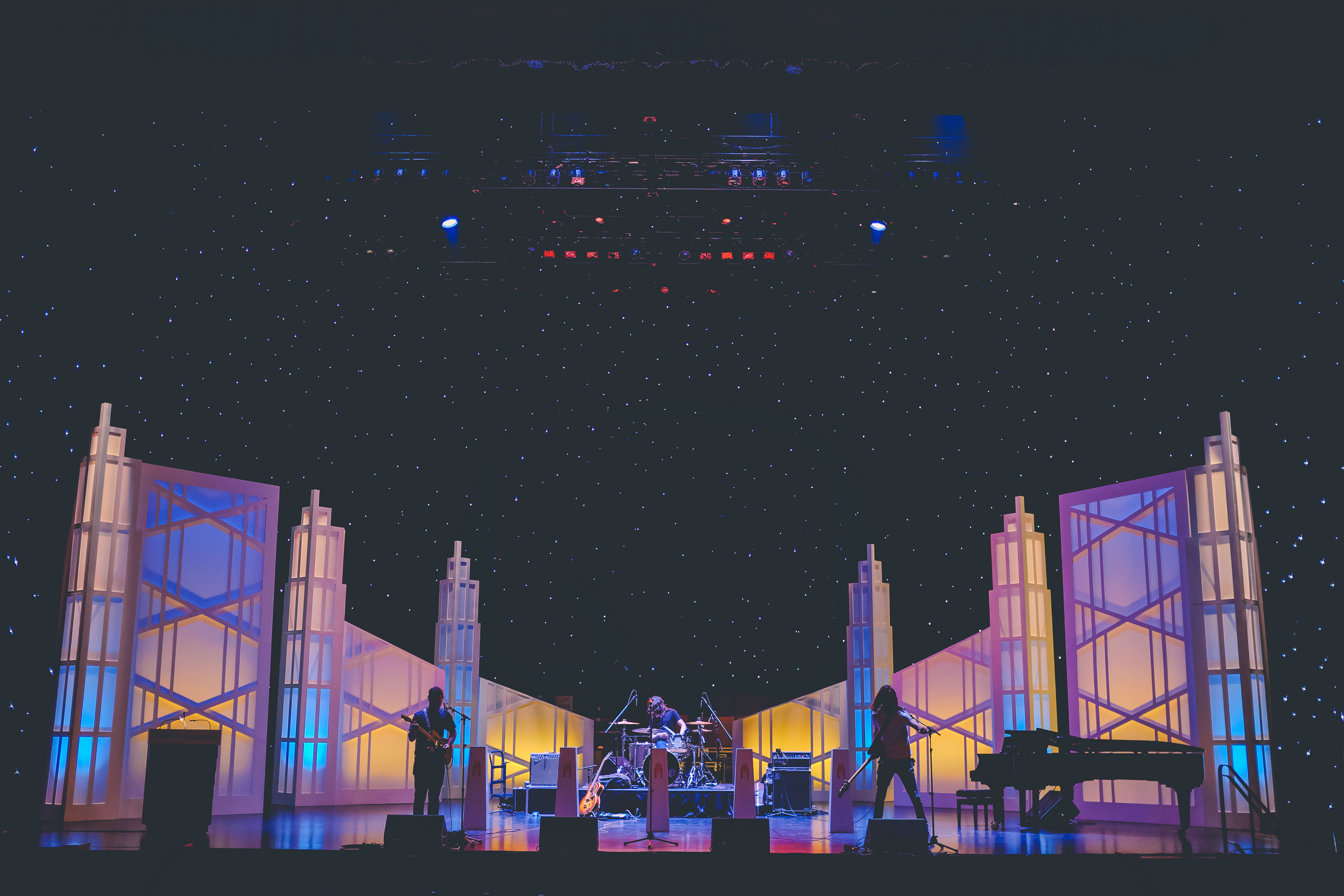
Reynolds Hall main stage at The Smith Center

The "First Friday" celebration, held on the first Friday of each month, exhibits the works of local artists and musicians in an area just south of downtown. The city is home to an extensive Downtown Arts District which hosts numerous galleries, film festivals, and events.

The Southern Nevada Zoological-Botanical Park, also known as the Las Vegas Zoo, used to exhibit over 150 species of animals and plants. The Zoo closed its doors in September 2013.

The Shark Reef Aquarium at Mandalay Bay is the only aquarium that is accredited by the Association of Zoos and Aquariums in the state of Nevada. It features over 2,000 animals and 1,200 species in 1.6 million gallons of seawater.

The $485 million Smith Center for the Performing Arts is located downtown in Symphony Park. The center is appropriate for Broadway shows and other major touring attractions as well as orchestral, opera, choir, jazz, and dance performances.

Bellagio Gallery of Fine Art is a facility presenting high-quality art exhibitions from major national and international museums. Past exhibits have included the works of Andy Warhol, Alexander Calder, and Peter Carl Fabergé. A self-guided audio tour is also offered.

The Las Vegas Natural History Museum features robot dinosaurs, live fish, and more than 26 species of preserved animals. There are several "hands-on" areas where animals can be petted.

The Atomic Testing Museum, affiliated with the Smithsonian Institution, houses artifacts from the Nevada Test Site and records the dramatic history of the atomic age through a series of interactive modules, timelines, films, and actual equipment and gadgets from the site.

In 2019, The New York Times noted that there was a "burgeoning literary scene" at Las Vegas centered around the Black Mountain Institute, a literature organization at the University of Nevada, Las Vegas, and its literary magazine, The Believer.

The valley is home to numerous other art galleries, orchestras, ballets, theaters, sculptures, and museums as well.

=== Festivals ===
- CineVegas
- Helldorado Days
- Electric Daisy Carnival
- Feast of San Gennaro
- Las Vegas Pride Festival
- The Dam Short Film Festival (Note: While outside of the Valley, considered to be a Las Vegas destination due to close proximity.)
- Life is Beautiful

=== Gardens ===
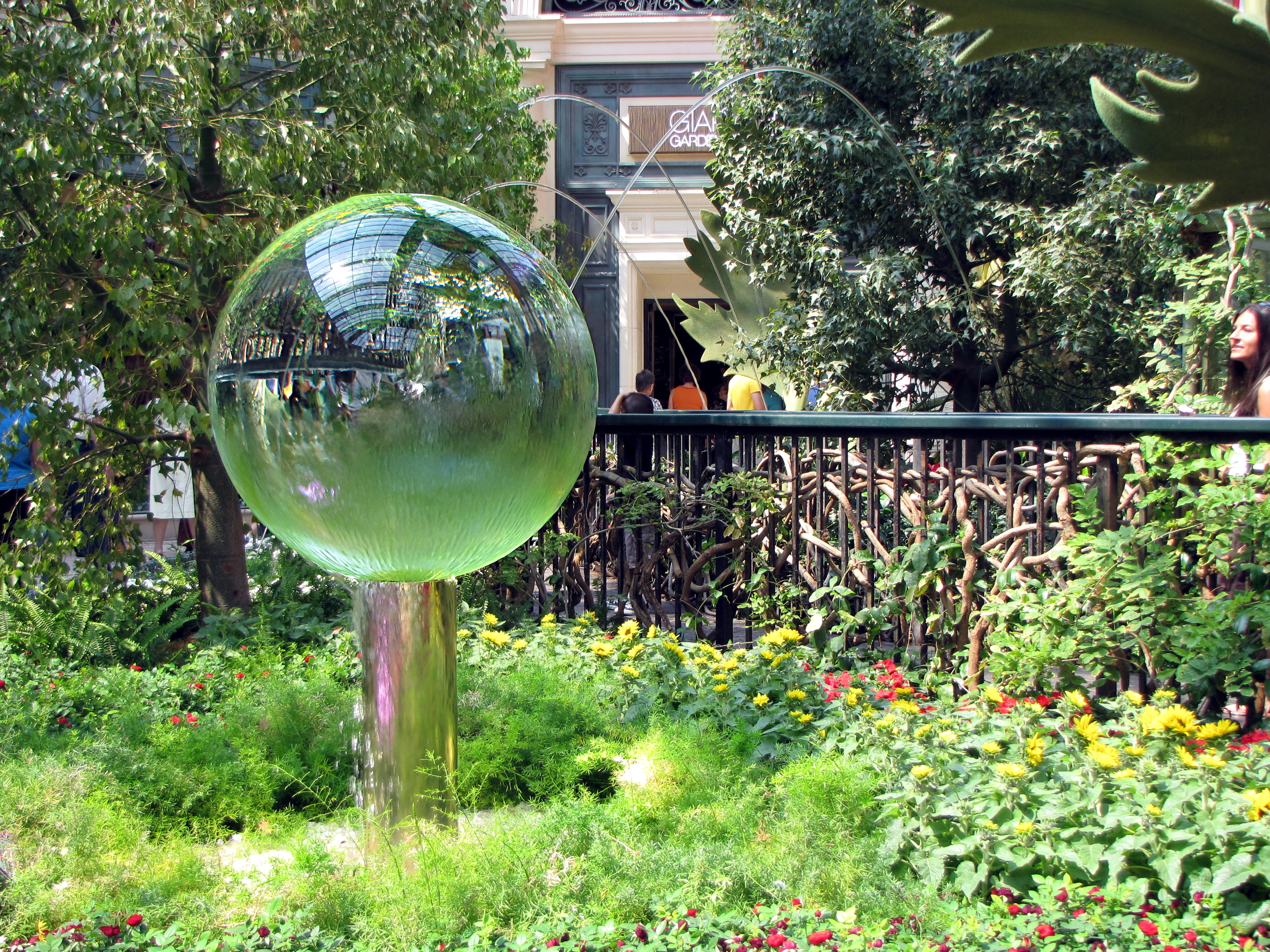
The Bellagio Conservatory & Botanical Gardens

- Alan Bible Botanical Garden
- Ethel M Botanical Cactus Garden
- Bellagio Conservatory & Botanical Gardens
- The Gardens at the Las Vegas Springs Preserve
- UNLV Arboretum

=== Libraries and bookstores ===
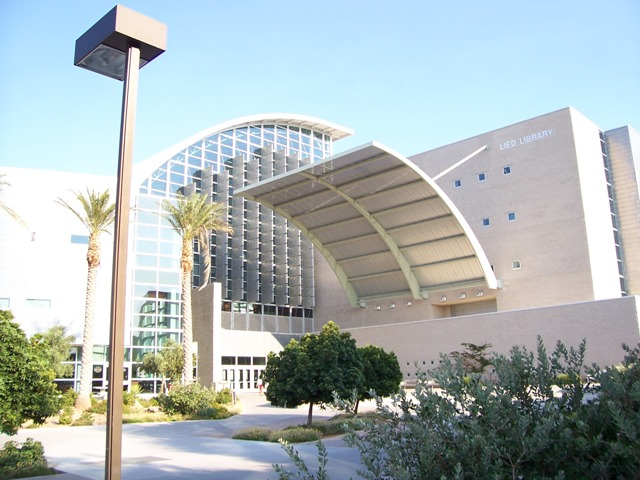
The Lied Library

- The Writer's Block
- Architecture Studies Library
- Las Vegas–Clark County Library District
- Lied Library (at UNLV)
- North Las Vegas Library District
- Henderson District Public Libraries

=== Museums ===
- Atomic Testing Museum
- Burlesque Hall of Fame
- Clark County Heritage Museum
- Discovery Children's Museum
- Erotic Heritage Museum
- Howard W. Cannon Aviation Museum
- The Linq Auto Collection
- Las Vegas Art Museum
- Las Vegas Museum of Organized Crime and Law Enforcement
- Las Vegas Natural History Museum
- Liberace Museum
- Lost City Museum
- Madame Tussauds
- Marjorie Barrick Museum (at UNLV)
- Neon Museum
- Nevada State Museum
- Nevada Southern Railroad Museum
- Pinball Hall of Fame
- Shelby Museum
- Southern Nevada Museum of Fine Art
- Thunderbirds Museum

=== Parks and attractions ===
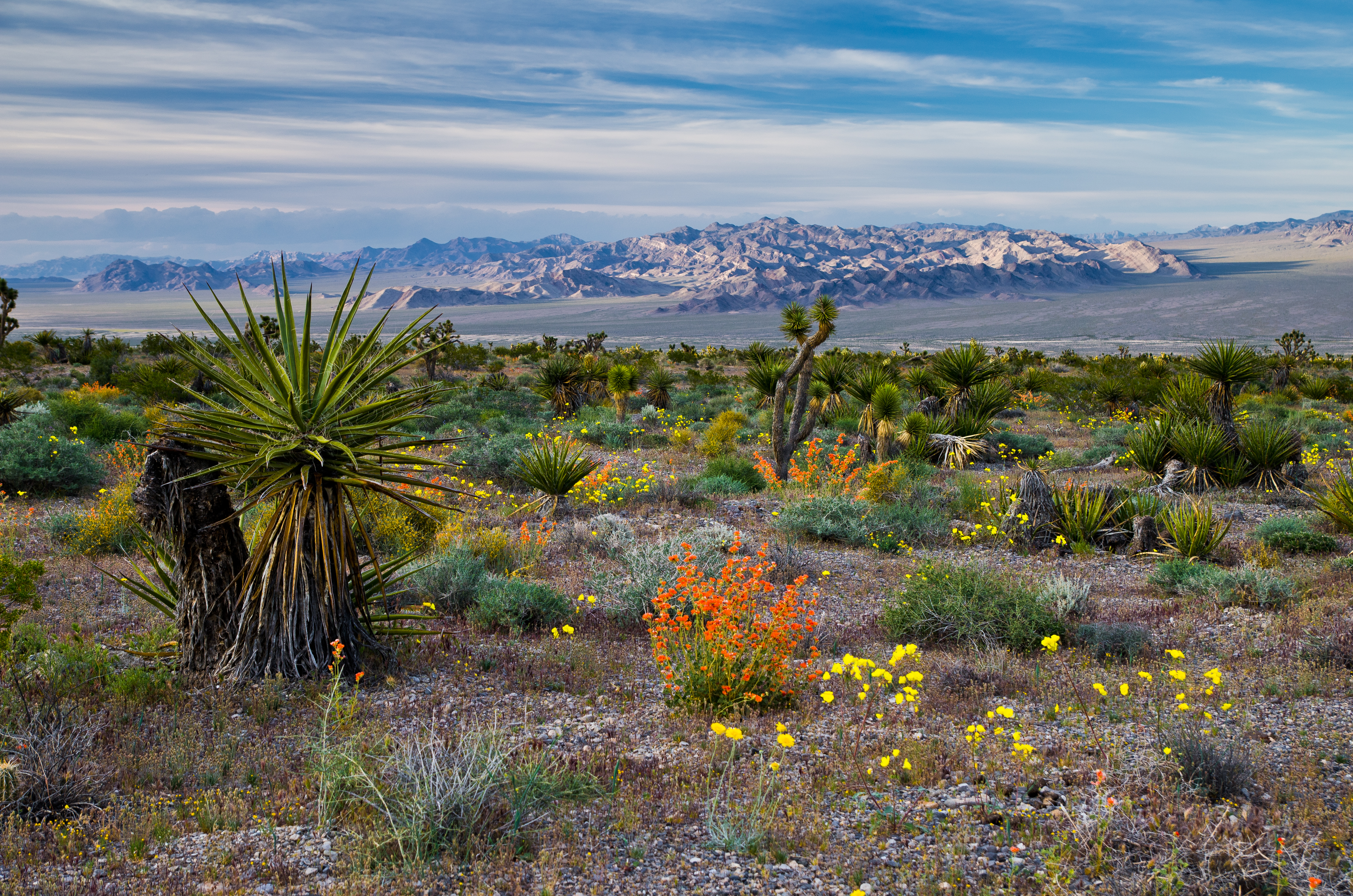
Wildflowers in Red Rock Canyon National Conservation Area

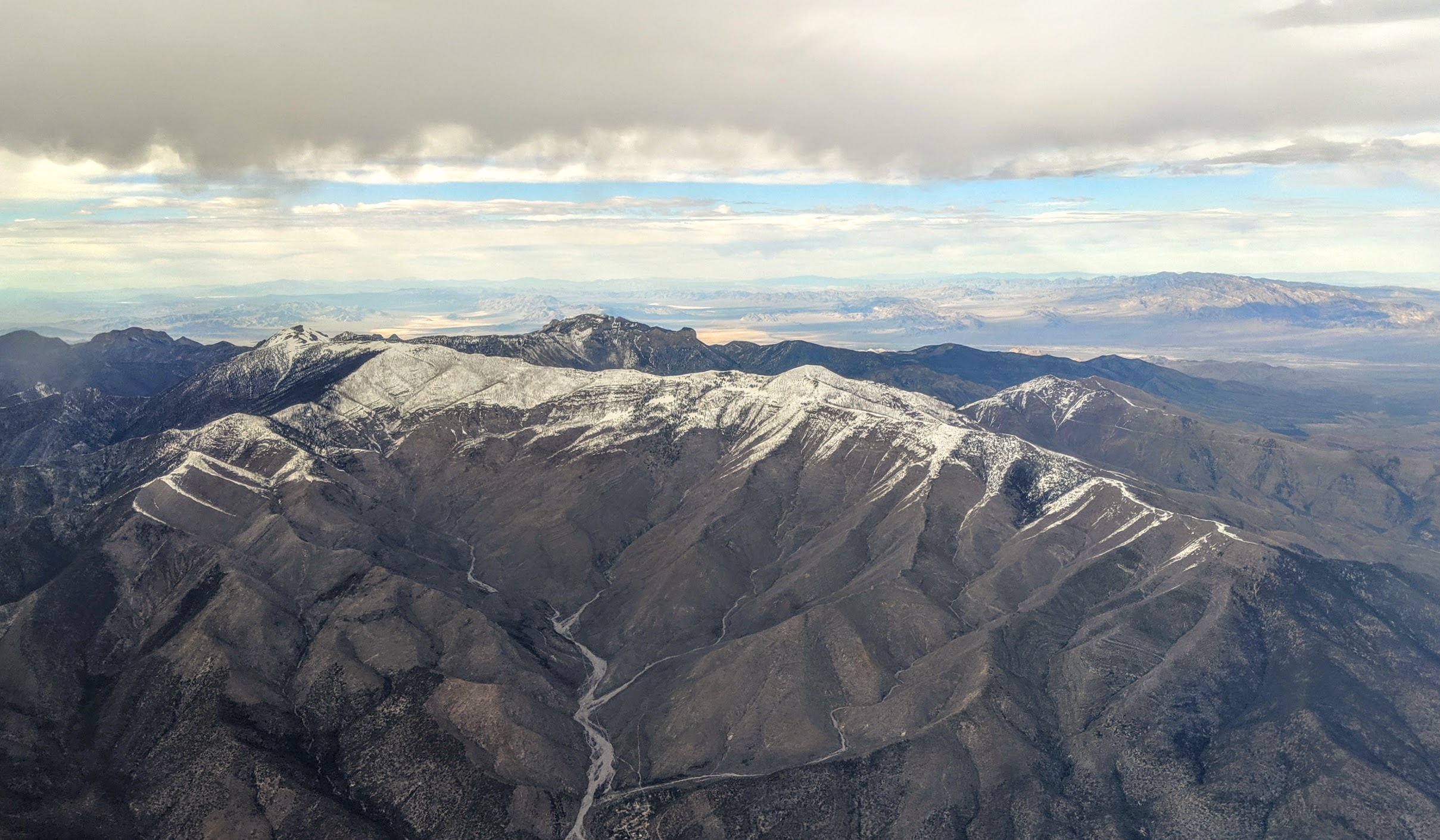
Mount Charleston

- Acacia Demonstration Gardens
- The Amanda & Stacy Darling Memorial Tennis Center
- Bettye Wilson Soccer Complex
- Clark County Shooting Park
- Clark County Wetlands Park
- Floyd Lamb Park at Tule Springs
- Hoover Dam
- Lake Mead National Recreation Area
- Las Vegas Motor Speedway
- Las Vegas Springs Preserve
- Mount Charleston
- Old Las Vegas Mormon Fort State Historic Park
- Red Rock Canyon National Conservation Area
- Spring Mountains National Recreation Area
- Sunset Park
- Tule Springs Fossil Beds National Monument
- Valley of Fire State Park
- Cowabunga Canyon Waterpark

=== Theaters ===
- Huntridge Theater
- Lance Burton Theatre
- Las Vegas Little Theater
- The Smith Center for the Performing Arts
- Theatre for the Performing Arts

=== Wildlife ===
- Southern Nevada Zoological-Botanical Park
- Shark Reef at Mandalay Bay
- Siegfried & Roy's Secret Garden and Dolphin Habitat

== Communities ==
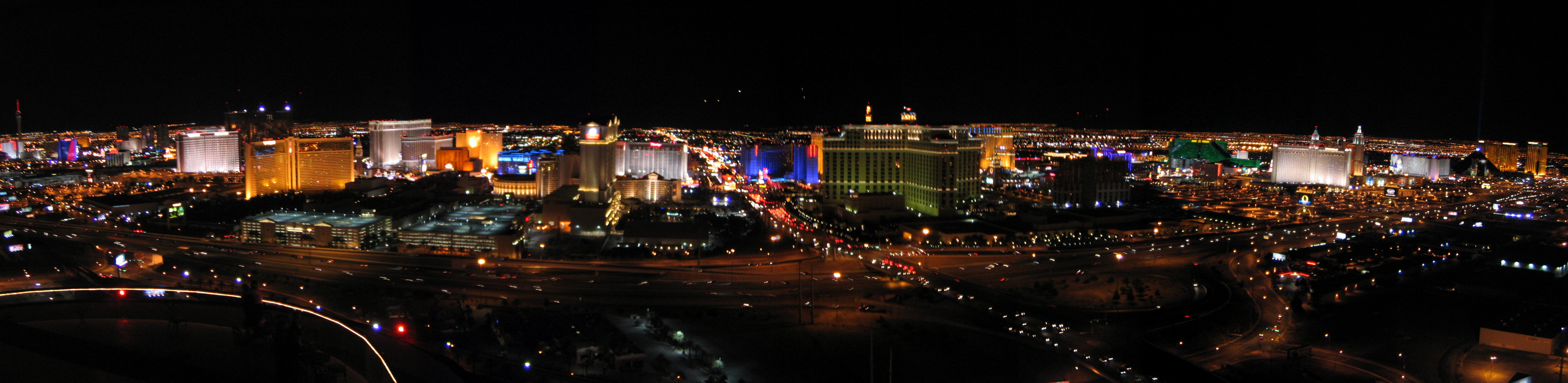
The Las Vegas Strip in 2004, as seen from the top of the Rio. The Strip is largely within Paradise.

=== Cities ===
- Boulder City
- Henderson
- Las Vegas
- North Las Vegas

=== Notable Las Vegas neighborhoods ===
- Aliante
- Anthem/Anthem Country Club
- Cadence
- Centennial Hills
- Chinatown
- Downtown Las Vegas
- Green Valley/Green Valley Ranch
- Lake Las Vegas
- Las Vegas Country Club
- MacDonald Highlands
- Mountain's Edge
- Paradise Palms
- Queensridge
- Rancho Circle
- Red Rock Country Club
- Rhodes Ranch
- Seven Hills
- Silverado Ranch
- Skye Canyon
- Southern Highlands
- Southern Highlands Golf Club
- Spanish Trail
- Summerlin
- Summerlin South
- The Lakes
- The Ridges
- Tuscany Village
- West Las Vegas

=== Census-designated places ===
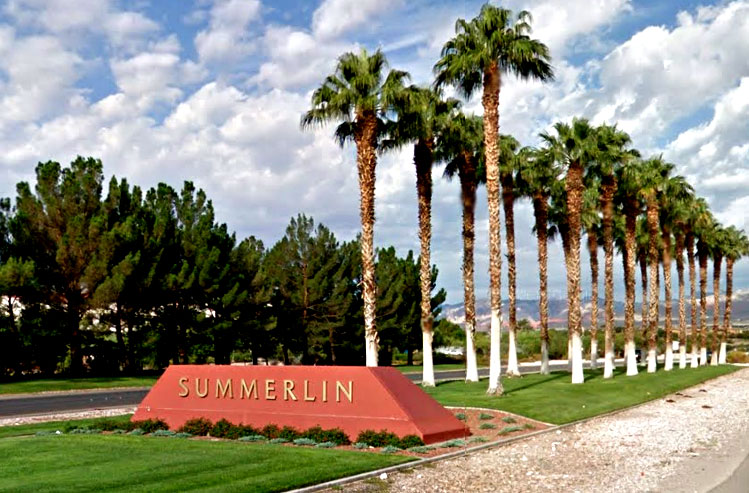
The entrance to Summerlin, a local planned community

- Blue Diamond
- Enterprise
- Paradise
- Spring Valley
- Summerlin South
- Sunrise Manor
- Whitney
- Winchester

=== Other communities ===
- Sloan

== Media ==
=== Newspapers ===
- Las Vegas Review-Journal, the area's largest daily newspaper, is published every morning. It was formed in 1909 but has roots back to 1905. It is the largest newspaper in Nevada and is ranked as one of the top 25 newspapers in the United States by circulation. In 2000, the Review-Journal installed the largest newspaper printing press in the world. It cost $40 million, weighs 910 tons and consists of 16 towers. The newspaper was owned by casino magnate Sheldon Adelson, who purchased the newspaper for $140 million in December 2015. In 2018, the Review-Journal received the Sigma Delta Chi Award from the Society of Professional Journalists for reporting the 2017 Las Vegas shooting. In 2018, Editor & Publisher magazine named the Review-Journal as one of 10 newspapers in the United States "doing it right".
- Las Vegas Sun is a daily 8-page newspaper distributed as a section of the Review-Journal. It is owned by the Greenspun family and is affiliated with Greenspun Media Group. The Sun was founded in 1950 and in 1989 entered into a Joint Operating Agreement with the Review-Journal, which runs through 2040. It has been described as "politically liberal." In 2009, the Sun was awarded a Pulitzer Prize for Public Service for coverage of the high death rate of construction workers on the Las Vegas Strip amid lax enforcement of regulations.
- Las Vegas Weekly is a free alternative weekly newspaper based in Henderson, Nevada. It covers Las Vegas arts, entertainment, culture and news. Las Vegas Weekly was founded in 1992 and is published by Greenspun Media Group.

=== Broadcast ===
Las Vegas is served by 22 television and 46 radio stations. The area is also served by two NOAA Weather Radio transmitters (162.55 MHz located in Boulder City and 162.40 MHz located on Mount Potosi).

- Radio stations in Las Vegas
- Television stations in Las Vegas

=== Magazines ===
- Desert Companion
- Las Vegas Weekly
- Luxury Las Vegas

== Transportation ==
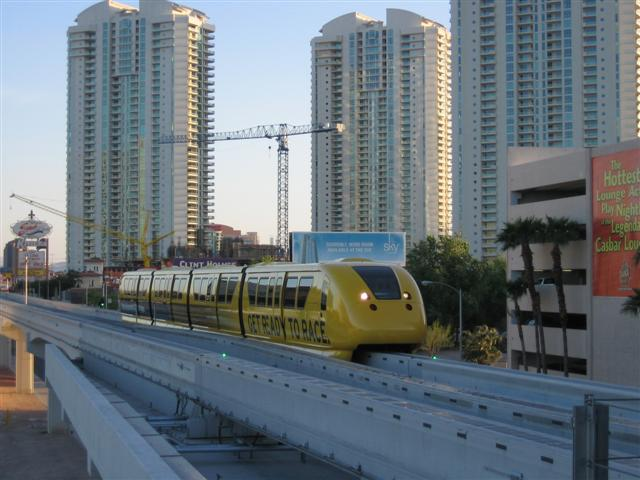
The Las Vegas Monorail pulling into the Sahara station in Paradise

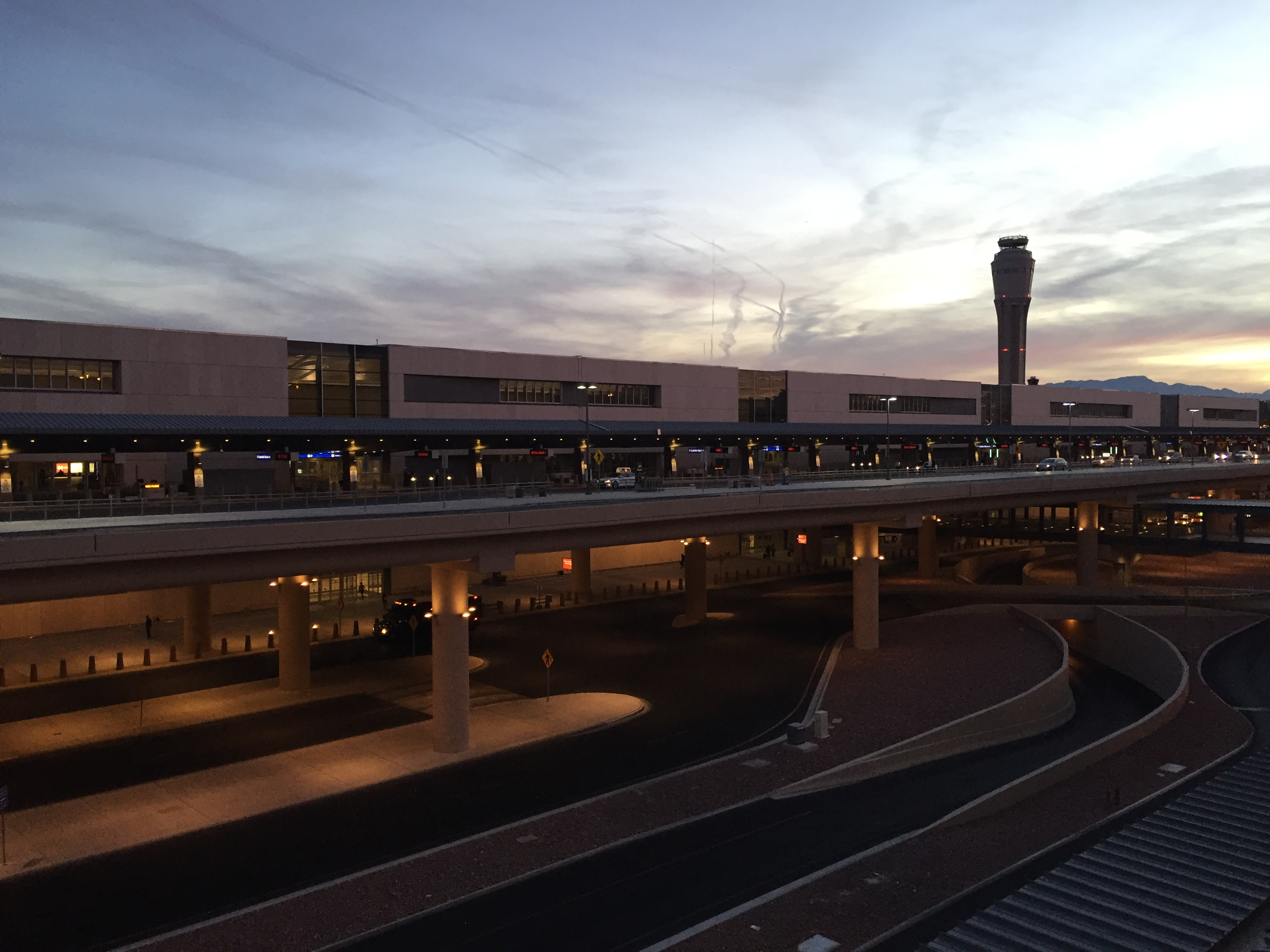
Harry Reid International Airport Terminal 3

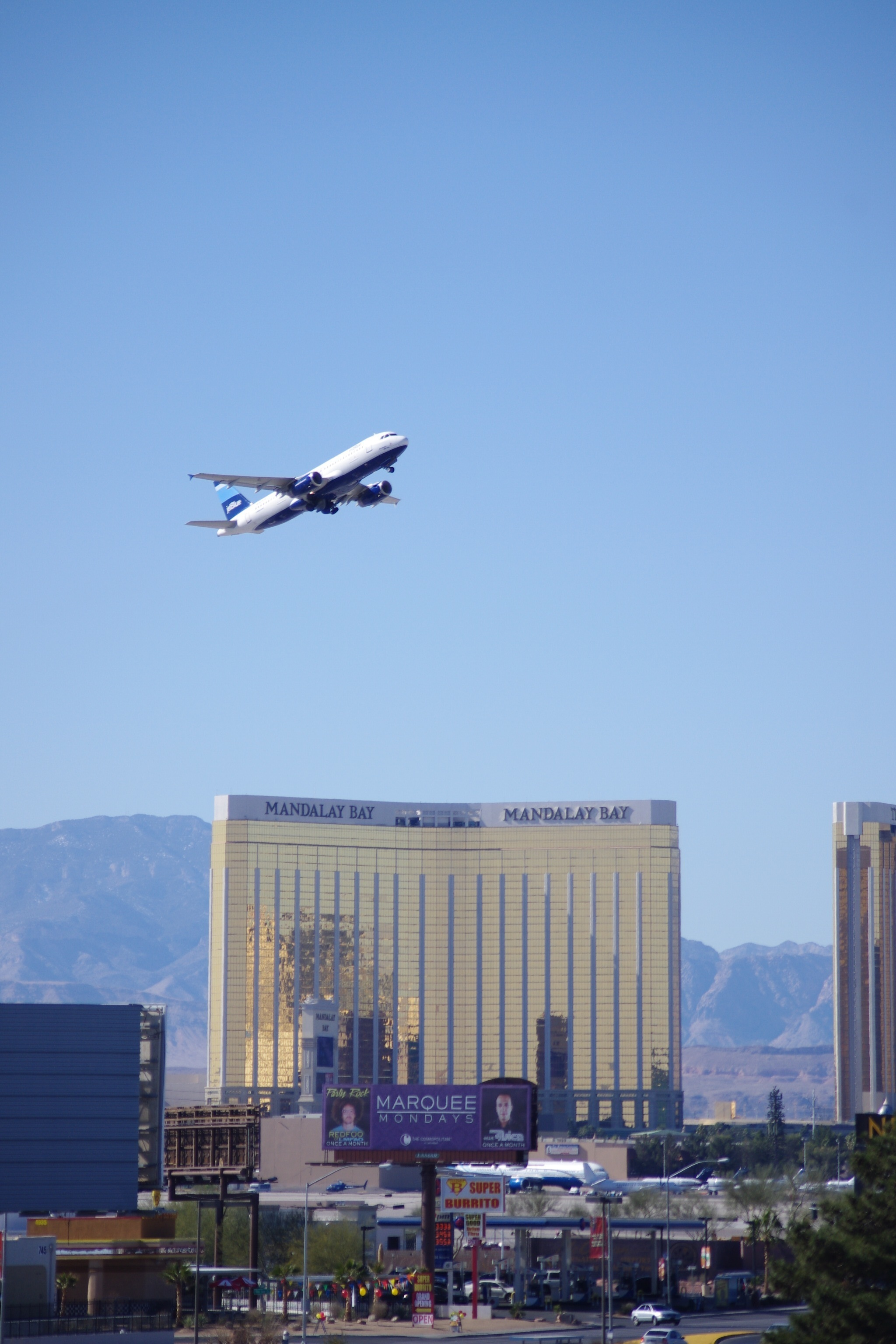
A JetBlue Airbus A320 taking off from Harry Reid International Airport

Harry Reid International Airport (LAS) provides commercial flights into the Las Vegas Valley. The airport serves domestic, international and cargo flights, as well as some private aircraft. General aviation traffic, however, will typically use the much smaller North Las Vegas Airport or other airfields in the county. Public transportation is provided by RTC Transit. Numerous bus routes cover Las Vegas, Henderson, North Las Vegas and other suburban areas.

The Las Vegas Monorail runs from MGM Grand Las Vegas at the south end of the Strip to the Sahara Las Vegas at the north end of the Strip. The street numbering system is divided by the following streets:

- Westcliff Drive, US 95, Fremont Street and Charleston Boulevard divide the north–south block numbers from west to east.
- Las Vegas Boulevard divides the east–west streets from the Las Vegas Strip to near the Stratosphere, then Main Street becomes the dividing line from the Stratosphere to the North Las Vegas border, after which the Goldfield Street alignment officially divides east and west.
- On the east side of Las Vegas, block numbers between Charleston Boulevard and Washington Avenue are different along Nellis Boulevard, which is the eastern border of the city limits.
- All city street signs begin with a N, S, W or E designation.

Until 1997, the Amtrak Desert Wind train service ran through Las Vegas using the Union Pacific Railroad (UP) rails that run through the city; Amtrak service to Las Vegas has since been replaced by Amtrak's Thruway Motorcoach bus service. Plans to restore Los Angeles to Las Vegas Amtrak service using a Talgo train have been discussed but no plan for a replacement has been implemented. The Las Vegas Amtrak station was located in the Plaza Hotel. It had the distinction of being the only train station located in a casino.

=== Airports ===
- Harry Reid International Airport
- Henderson Executive Airport
- North Las Vegas Airport
- Southern Nevada Supplemental Airport (planned)

=== Rail and bus ===
While the Las Vegas area does not have any passenger rail service, Brightline West intends to revive passenger trains with a high-speed train between the Las Vegas station and the Rancho Cucamonga station in Greater Los Angeles.

Las Vegas receives about 30 freight trains per day as of 2004, and serves as a district crew change point, requiring all trains to stop in downtown. Freight traffic was 179,284 cars in 2004.

==== Existing services ====
- RTC Transit
  - Las Vegas Monorail

===== Resort trams =====
- Aria Express
- Mandalay Bay Tram
- Hard Rock-Treasure Island Tram

=== Roads ===
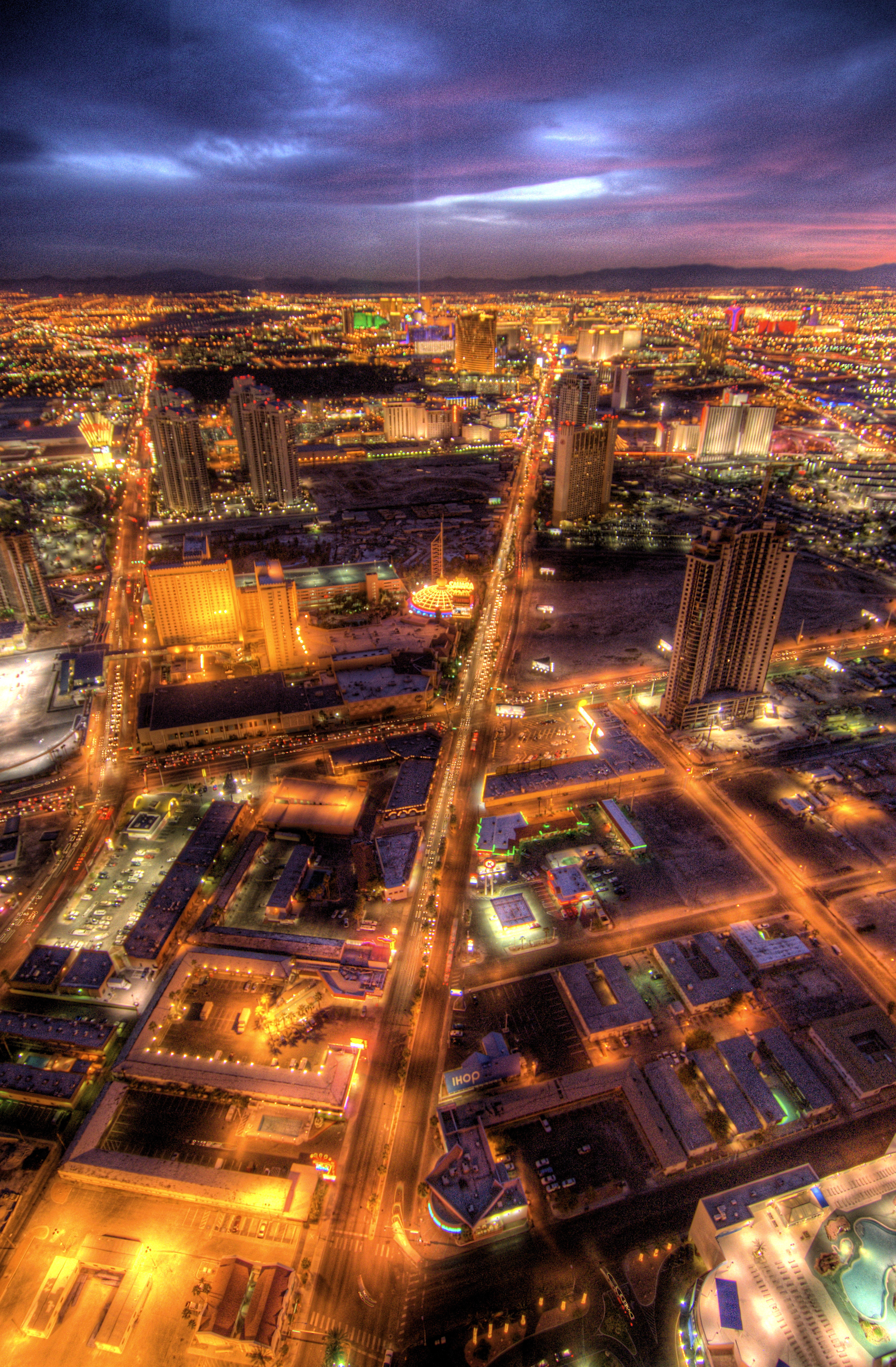
Las Vegas Boulevard looking south from the Stratosphere

Two major freeways—Interstate 11 (including US 93 and US 95) and Interstate 15—cross in downtown Las Vegas. I-11 goes northwest to the Las Vegas city limits and southeast to Henderson, bypassing downtown Boulder City just to the south, and then to the Mike O'Callaghan–Pat Tillman Memorial Bridge over the Colorado River, from there U.S. Route 93 continues towards Phoenix, Arizona. I-11 will eventually be the connection from Nogales, Arizona to Interstate 80 in Fernley (near the Reno and Sparks area). US 95 connects the city to northwestern Nevada, including Carson City (the state capitol) and Reno. US 93 splits from I-15 northeast of Las Vegas and goes north through the northeastern part of the state, serving Ely and Wells and US 95 heads south from I-11 and US 93 in Boulder City through far southeastern California. I-15 connects Las Vegas to Los Angeles (via San Bernardino) and San Diego, and heads northeast to Salt Lake City and beyond. A three-quarters of the Las Vegas Beltway has been built, consisting of Interstate 215 on the south and Clark County 215 on the west and north. Other radial routes include SR 160 to Pahrump and SR 147 and SR 564 (former SR 146) to Lake Mead.

With the notable exceptions of Las Vegas Boulevard, Boulder Highway and Tonopah Highway (better known as the northern part of Rancho Drive), the majority of surface streets outside downtown Las Vegas are laid out along Public Land Survey System section lines. Many are maintained, in part, by the Nevada Department of Transportation (NDOT) as state highways.

East–west roads, north to south

- Elkhorn Road
- Las Vegas Beltway (CC 215)
- Ann Road
- Craig Road (SR 573)
- Cheyenne Avenue (SR 574)
- Carey Avenue
- Lake Mead Boulevard (SR 147)
- Washington Avenue (SR 578)
- Summerlin Parkway (SR 613) – on the west side past Rainbow Boulevard
- Bonanza Road (SR 579)
- Interstate 11 and US 95 – on the west side of the valley
- – Interstate 11, US 93 and US 95 on the east side of the valley
- Charleston Boulevard (SR 159)
- Sahara Avenue (former SR 589)
- Desert Inn Road
- Spring Mountain Road (former SR 591)
- Flamingo Road (SR 592)
- Tropicana Avenue (SR 593)
- Russell Road (SR 594)
- Sunset Road (SR 562)
- Warm Springs Road
- Blue Diamond Road (SR 160)
- Las Vegas Beltway (I-215)
- Lake Mead Parkway (formerly Lake Mead Drive) (SR 564)
- Horizon Ridge Parkway
- Saint Rose Parkway (formerly Lake Mead Drive) (SR 146)

North–south roads, west to east

- Las Vegas Beltway (CC 215)
- Durango Drive
- Buffalo Drive
- Rainbow Boulevard (SR 595)
- Jones Boulevard (SR 596)
- Decatur Boulevard
- Valley View Boulevard
- Dean Martin Drive (formerly Industrial Road)
- Interstate 15
- Las Vegas Boulevard (SR 604)
- Rancho Drive (SR 599)
- Paradise Road (SR 605)
- Maryland Parkway
- Eastern Avenue (SR 607)
- Pecos Road
- – Interstate 11, US 93 and US 95 south of Charleston Boulevard
- Lamb Boulevard (SR 610)
- Nellis Boulevard (SR 612)

Major Freeways

- Interstate 11 and US 95
- Interstate 15
- Las Vegas Beltway (I-215 and CC 215)
- Summerlin Parkway (SR 613)

=== Fuel ===
The Las Vegas area is dependent on imported gasoline, diesel and aviation fuel as is most of Nevada, which has only one refinery. The region is dependent on the Calnev Pipeline and Unev pipeline as its two main sources of supply. Limited diesel is delivered to a dedicated terminal in North Las Vegas by rail. Diversified supply was provided by the completion of construction on the Unev pipeline in 2011 and its full operational status in 2012.

=== Electricity ===
About 25% of the electric power from Hoover Dam goes to Nevada, and about 70% of power to Southern Nevada comes from natural gas fired power stations.

== Sports ==
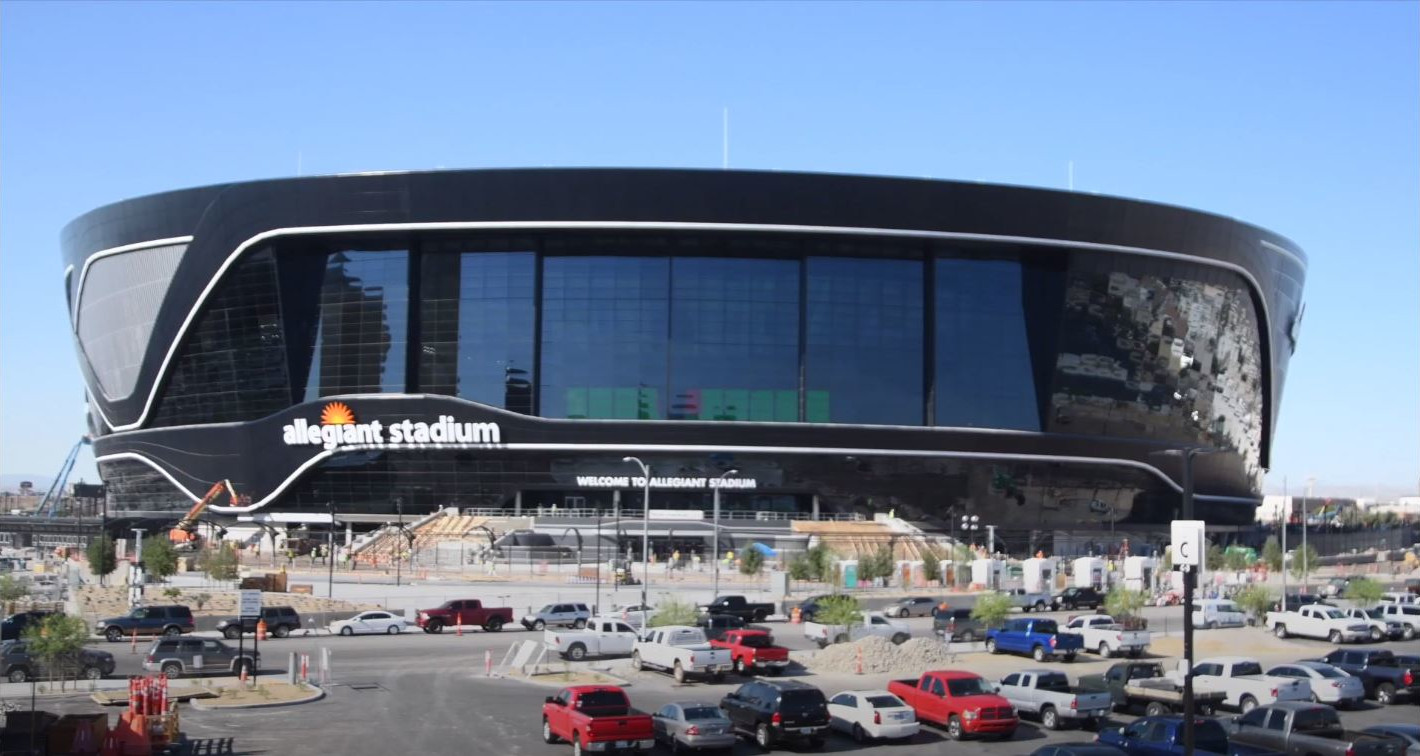
Allegiant Stadium

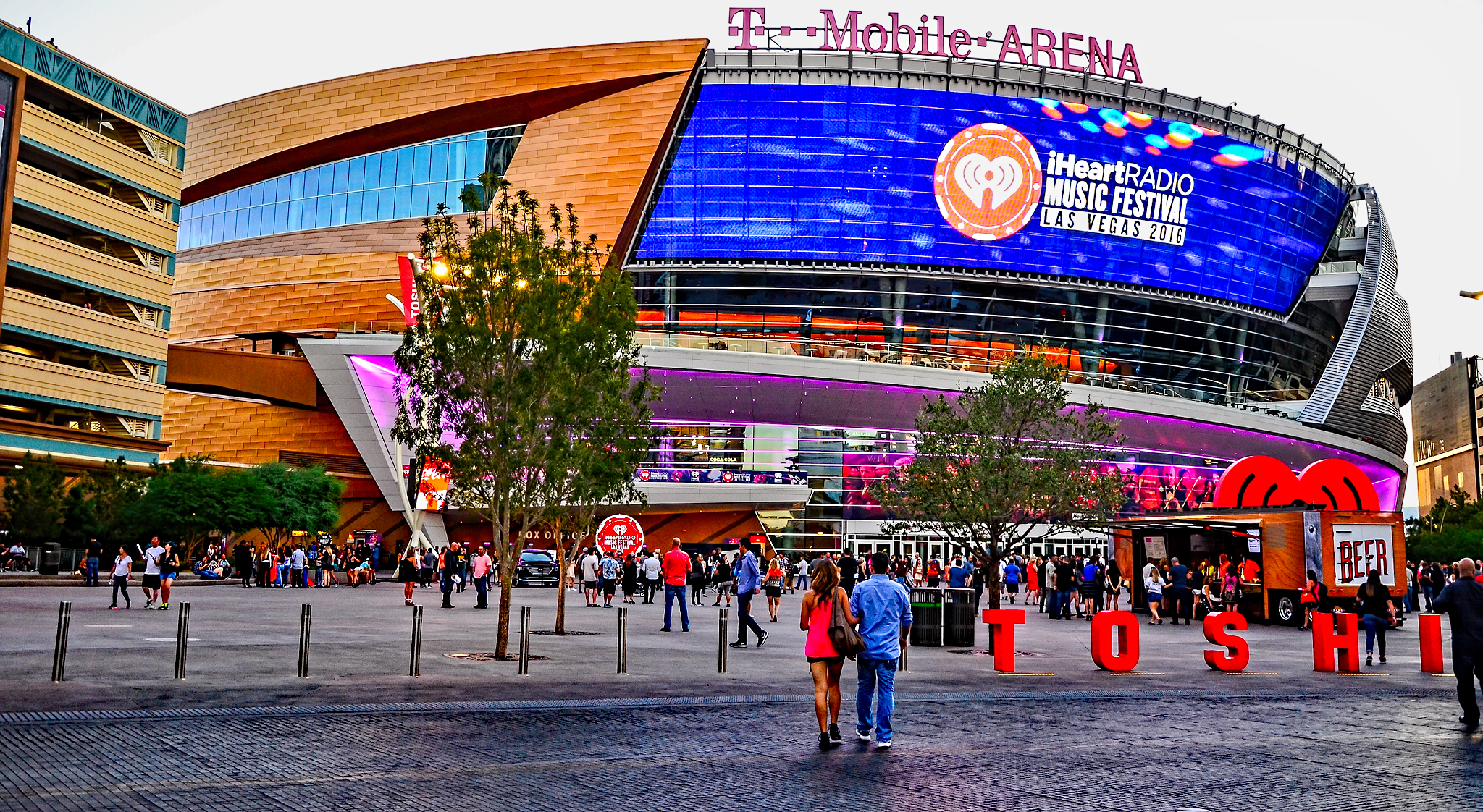
T-Mobile Arena as seen from Toshiba Plaza

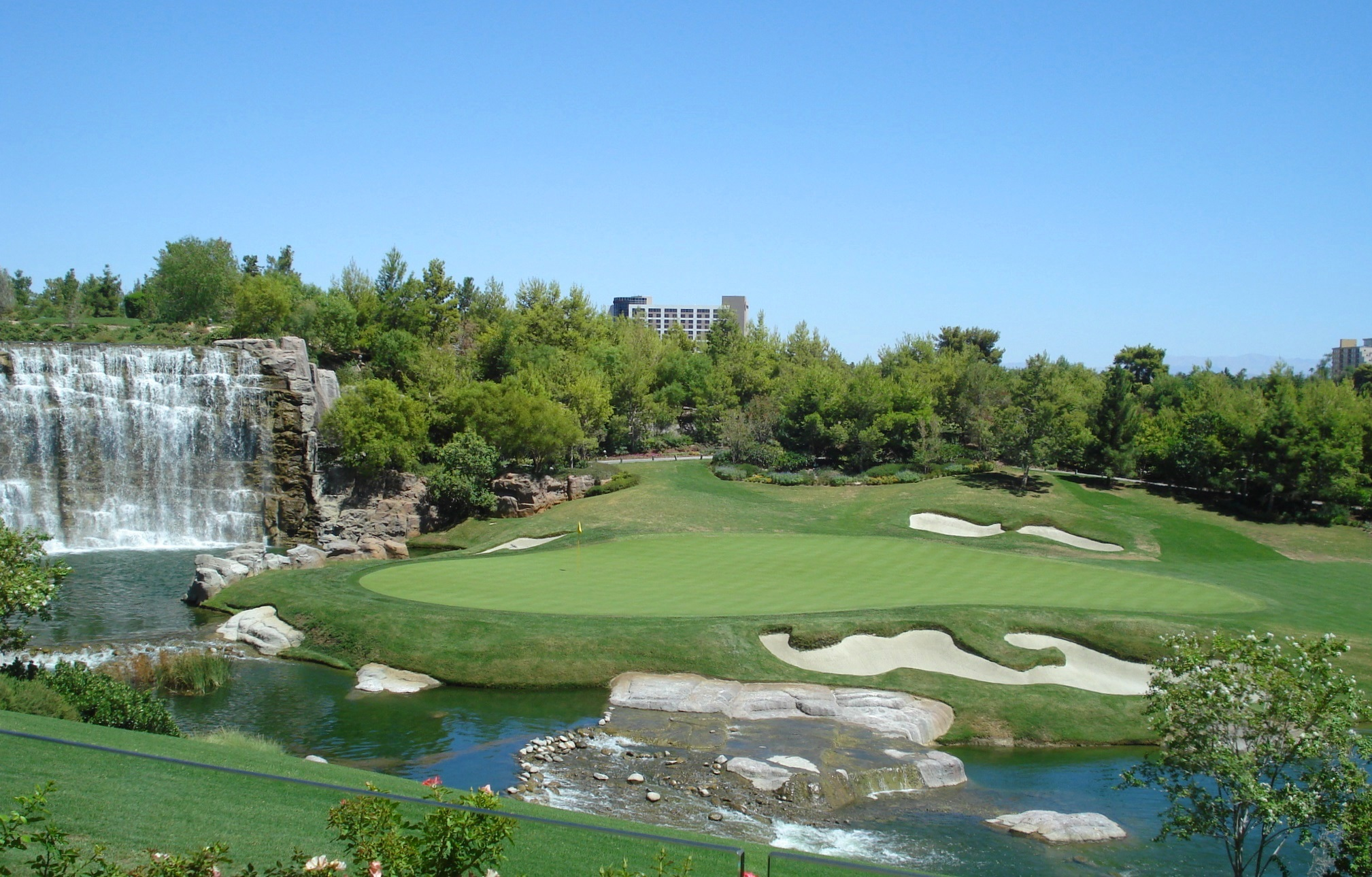
The Wynn Golf Club

Las Vegas is home to several notable minor league teams, as well as the UNLV Rebels, and three major professional teams, the Las Vegas Raiders of the National Football League, the Vegas Golden Knights of the National Hockey League, and the Las Vegas Aces of the Women's National Basketball Association. The Athletics of Major League Baseball plan to move to Las Vegas in 2028. The Las Vegas Valley also hosts the headquarters of UNLV's primary conference, the Mountain West Conference.

Professional sports teams
Club	Sport	League	Venue (capacity)	Since	Titles
Las Vegas Raiders	Football	NFL	Allegiant Stadium (65,000)	1960	3 (Note: Two titles were won when the team was based in Oakland, California and one was won when they were based in Los Angeles, California.)
Athletics	Baseball	MLB	New Las Vegas Stadium (33,000)	1901	9
Vegas Golden Knights	Ice hockey	NHL	T-Mobile Arena (17,368)	2017	1
Vegas Vanguards	Ice hockey	PWHL	T-Mobile Arena (17,368)	2026	0
Las Vegas Aces	Basketball	WNBA	Michelob Ultra Arena (12,000)	2018	3
Las Vegas Aviators	Baseball	PCL	Las Vegas Ballpark (10,000)	1983	2
Henderson Silver Knights	Ice hockey	AHL	Dollar Loan Center (5,567)	2021	0
Vegas Knight Hawks	Indoor football	IFL	Dollar Loan Center (5,567)	2021	1
Las Vegas Lights FC	Soccer	USLC	Cashman Field (9,300)	2018	0
Las Vegas Desert Dogs	Box Lacrosse	NLL	Dollar Loan Center (5,567)	2021	1
Vegas Thrill	Volleyball	MLV	Dollar Loan Center (5,567)	2023	0

== Recreation ==
Las Vegas has many natural outdoor recreational options.

There are several multi-use trail systems within the valley operated by multiple organizations. The River Mountains Loop Trail is a 35-mile-long (56 km) trail that connects the west side of the valley with Hoover Dam and Lake Mead. Summerlin offers more than 150 miles of award-winning trails within the 22,500-acre (9,100 ha) community. There are also the 3-mile (4.8 km) Angel Park Trail, Bonanza Trail, and the county's Flamingo Arroyo Trail, I-215 West Beltway Trail (5 miles (8.0 km)), I-215 East Beltway Trail (4 miles (6.4 km)), Tropicana/Flamingo Washes Trail and the Western Trails Park Area Equestrian Trails (4 miles).

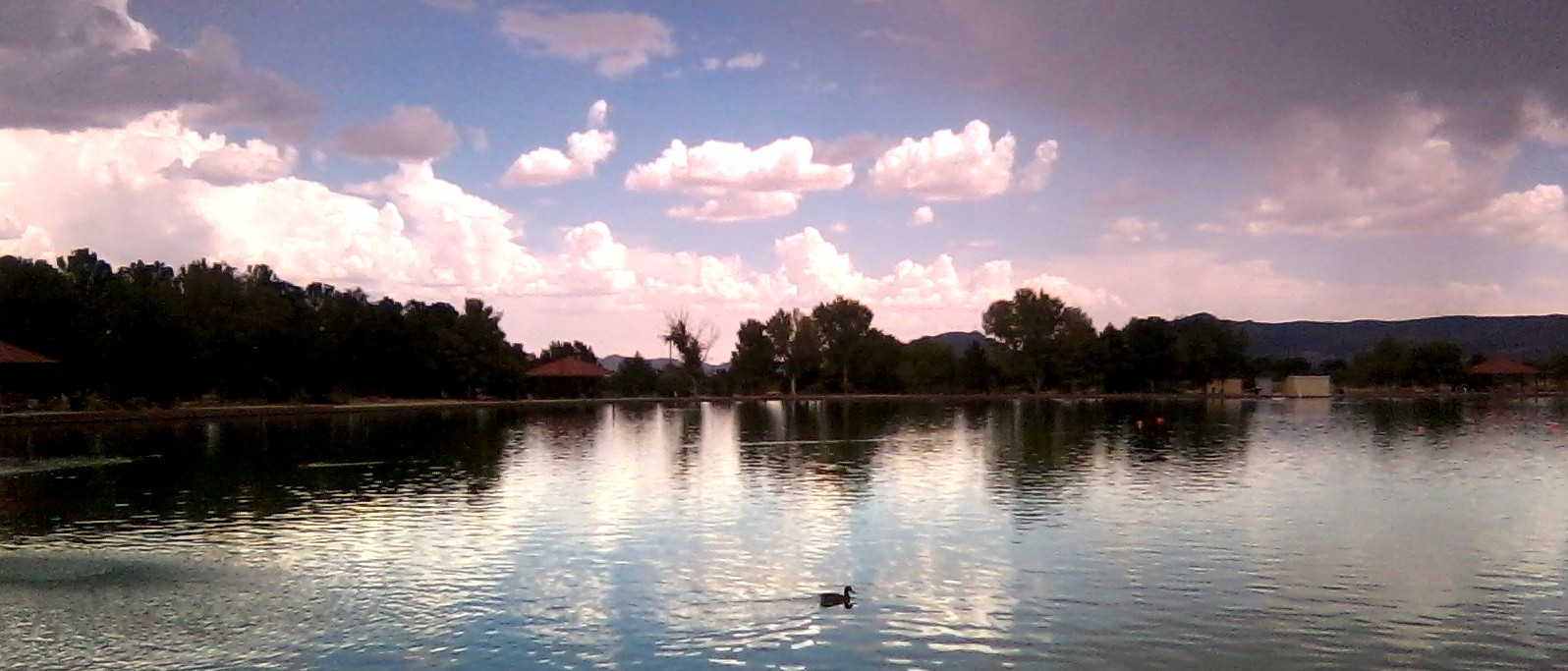
Sunset Park at dusk

The Las Vegas Valley also hosts world class mountain biking including Bootleg Canyon Mountain Bike Park located in Boulder City which boasts itself as one of the International Mountain Biking Association's "epic rides".

== Education ==
=== Primary and secondary ===
The Clark County School District operates all of the public primary and secondary schools in the county with the exception of 37 sponsored public charter schools.

Selected private schools
Alexander Dawson School
Bishop Gorman High School
Faith Lutheran Jr/Sr High School
The Meadows School

=== Colleges and universities ===
The University of Nevada, Las Vegas (UNLV) is in Paradise, about three miles (5 km) south of the Las Vegas city limits and roughly two miles east of the Strip. Several national colleges, including the University of Phoenix and Le Cordon Bleu, have campuses in the Las Vegas area. Nevada State University, National University and Touro University Nevada are nearby Henderson. The College of Southern Nevada has campuses in Las Vegas, North Las Vegas and Henderson. Henderson also is home to DeVry University, as well as the Roseman University of Health Sciences. The for-profit Carrington College also has a location in the Las Vegas valley.

== Venues in Las Vegas ==
- Music venues in Las Vegas
- Sports venues in Las Vegas
- City of Rock (Las Vegas)

== See also ==
- Architecture of Las Vegas
- List of Las Vegas Strip hotels
- List of people from Las Vegas
- List of restaurants in the Las Vegas Valley
- Las Vegas shows
