= Desert Inn Road =

Road in Las Vegas, Nevada

- Desert Inn Road Expressway in blue, remainder of Desert Inn Road in red

Route information
- Maintained by Clark County
- Length: 17.49 mi (28.15 km)

Major junctions
- West end: Red Rock Ranch Road / Flamingo Road in Summerlin South
- SR 595 in Spring Valley SR 582 in Sunrise Manor SR 612 in Whitney
- East end: Hollywood Boulevard in Whitney

Desert Inn Road, also known as Wilbur Clark D.I. Road, is a major west–east road in the Las Vegas metropolitan area, Nevada, United States. It is named after the former Desert Inn hotel and casino.

== Desert Inn Expressway ==
Desert Inn Expressway tunnel heading eastbound in 2026.

For the majority of its route, Desert Inn Road is a typical stroad with access to residential, commercial, and industrial areas. However, the route features a 2.5-mile-long (4.0-kilometer) expressway in the Las Vegas Strip with grade separations and partial interchanges, acting as a border for Paradise and Winchester. Although it is officially called the Desert Inn Road Super Arterial (also commonly referred to as the Desert Inn Expressway or DIE), it is signed as Wilbur Clark D.I. Road. Construction of the expressway was completed in 1996 with a cost of US$84 million. It is primarily used to bypass The Strip, passing over I-15 and under Las Vegas Boulevard.

== Route ==
Desert Inn Road eastbound just prior to the expressway tunnel in 2026. The Encore is visible in the background.

Desert Inn Road is disconnected from all freeways it crosses, with bridges over Clark County 215 (CC 215; Bruce Woodbury Beltway) and I-15 and is overpassed by I-11/US 93/US 95. It is also disconnected from Las Vegas Boulevard, with a tunnel passing under it, which makes it the only major east–west surface street on the Strip to not intersect with Las Vegas Boulevard.

Desert Inn Road begins in Summerlin South at Red Rock Ranch Road before crossing over CC 215 with no direct access and then crossing Hualapai Way and entering Las Vegas. The road intersects Rainbow Boulevard (SR 595), Jones Boulevard (former SR 596), Decatur Boulevard, and Valley View Boulevard, where the Desert Inn Road Super Arterial expressway begins.

The Desert Inn Expressway begins with driveways and minor roads connecting to it before forming a partial interchange (eastbound exit, westbound entrance) with Rancho Drive. A right-in/right-out (RIRO) on the eastbound side connects the expressway to Highland Drive, Western Avenue, and Spring Mountain Road before the expressway overpasses Highland Drive, the Union Pacific Railroad, and Sammy Davis Junior Drive. The Desert Inn Expressway then lowers from the viaduct to pass through a tunnel under Las Vegas Boulevard, where an eastbound entrance ramp leading from Wynn Boulevard connects. The expressway then crosses a signalized intersection with Paradise Road, underpasses the Las Vegas Monorail and Las Vegas Convention Center, and terminates at an intersection with University Center Drive and Joe W. Brown Drive. Desert Inn Road continues east as a standard arterial road.

Eventually, Desert Inn Road passes under I-11/US 93/US 95 and then intersects SR 582 (Boulder Highway) where it continues north as Lamb Boulevard, creating a short gap in the route. Desert Inn Road restarts off Lamb Boulevard, continues east, and crosses SR 612 (Nellis Boulevard). Near its eastern terminus, the road bridges over the Las Vegas Wash, which opened on September 19, 2022, and connected two dead-end segments of Desert Inn Road. Desert Inn Road ends at an intersection with Hollywood Boulevard on the eastern edge of the Sunrise Manor–Whitney border.

== Major intersections ==
The entire route is in Clark County.

Location	mi	km	Destinations	Notes
Summerlin South	0.00	0.00	Red Rock Ranch Road / Flamingo Road	Western terminus
Summerlin South	0.33– 0.39	0.53– 0.63	Bridge over CC 215	
Summerlin South	0.59	0.95	Golden Willow Lane	Serves The Alexander Dawson School at Rainbow Mountain
Summerlin South	0.93	1.50	Town Center Drive	
Las Vegas–Spring Valley line	1.46	2.35	Hualapai Way	
Las Vegas–Spring Valley line	1.96	3.15	Grand Canyon Drive	
Las Vegas–Spring Valley line	2.47	3.98	Fort Apache Road	
Las Vegas–Spring Valley line	2.94	4.73	Crystal Water Way	Southern terminus of Crystal Water Way
Las Vegas–Spring Valley line	2.98	4.80	El Capitan Way	Northern terminus of southern segment of El Capitan Way
Las Vegas–Spring Valley line	3.48	5.60	Durango Drive	Serves Desert Breeze Park
Spring Valley	3.98	6.41	Cimarron Road	
Spring Valley	4.48	7.21	Buffalo Drive	
Spring Valley	4.99	8.03	Tenaya Way	
Spring Valley	5.49	8.84	SR 595 (Rainbow Boulevard)	
Spring Valley	5.99	9.64	Torrey Pines Drive	
Spring Valley	6.49	10.44	Jones Boulevard	Former SR 596
Spring Valley	6.97	11.22	Lindell Road	
Las Vegas–Paradise line	7.44	11.97	Decatur Boulevard	
Las Vegas–Paradise line	7.94	12.78	Arville Street	
Las Vegas–Paradise line	8.44	13.58	Valley View Boulevard	Western terminus of Desert Inn Expressway
Las Vegas–Paradise line	8.63– 8.72	13.89– 14.03	Rancho Drive	Interchange; eastbound exit and westbound entrance
Las Vegas–Paradise line	8.93– 9.02	14.37– 14.52	Bridge over Rancho Drive and I-15	
Las Vegas–Paradise line	8.98– 9.09	14.45– 14.63	Highland Drive	Interchange; eastbound exit and entrance; provides access to Western Avenue and Spring Mountain Road; I-15 northbound exit 39 also provides access to Desert Inn Road
Winchester–Paradise line	8.93– 9.02	14.37– 14.52	Bridge over Highland Drive, Union Pacific Railroad, and Sammy Davis Junior Drive	
Winchester–Paradise line	9.79– 9.90	15.76– 15.93	Tunnel under Las Vegas Boulevard	Desert Inn Road changes signing from West Desert Inn Road to East Desert Inn Road
Winchester–Paradise line	9.95	16.01	Wynn Boulevard	Interchange; eastbound entrance only
Winchester–Paradise line	10.48	16.87	Paradise Road	Serves Las Vegas Convention Center and Las Vegas Monorail
Winchester–Paradise line	10.48– 10.98	16.87– 17.67	Corridor under Las Vegas Convention Center	
Winchester–Paradise line	10.98	17.67	Joe W. Brown Drive / University Center Drive	Eastern terminus of Desert Inn Expressway
Winchester–Paradise line	11.23	18.07	Cambridge Street	Cambridge Street terminus
Winchester–Paradise line	11.48	18.48	Maryland Parkway	Serves Sunrise Hospital & Medical Center
Winchester–Paradise line	11.62	18.70	Onieda Way	
Winchester–Paradise line	11.75	18.91	La Canada Street	
Winchester–Paradise line	12.51	20.13	Eastern Avenue	
Winchester–Paradise line	12.75	20.52	Topaz Road	
Winchester–Paradise line	13.00	20.92	McLeod Drive	
Winchester–Paradise line	13.14– 13.16	21.15– 21.18	Bridge over Flamingo Arroyo	
Winchester–Paradise line	13.25	21.32	Mojave Road	
Winchester–Paradise line	13.50	21.73	Pecos Road	
Winchester–Paradise line	14.00	22.53	Sandhill Road	
Winchester–Paradise line	14.15– 14.18	22.77– 22.82	Underpass under I-11/US 93/US 95	
Sunrise Manor–Paradise line	14.45	23.26	SR 582 (Boulder Highway) / Lamb Boulevard north	Eastern terminus; road continues north as Lamb Boulevard
Sunrise Manor–Paradise line	Gap in route			
Sunrise Manor–Paradise line	14.45	23.26	Lamb Boulevard	Western terminus
Whitney	15.48	24.91	SR 612 (Nellis Boulevard)	
Whitney	15.98	25.72	Cabena Drive	
Whitney	17.21	27.70	Bridge over the Las Vegas Wash	
Whitney	17.49	28.15	Hollywood Boulevard	Eastern terminus
1.000 mi = 1.609 km; 1.000 km = 0.621 mi: Incomplete access; Route transition

== Places along Desert Inn Road ==
The following are sorted by west-east location along Desert Inn Road.

- The Alexander Dawson School at Rainbow Mountain
- Desert Breeze Park (access via Durango Drive)
- Trump International Hotel Las Vegas (no direct access from Desert Inn Road)
- Resorts World Las Vegas (no direct access from Desert Inn Road)
- Encore Las Vegas (no direct access from Desert Inn Road)
- Las Vegas Convention Center (access via Paradise Road)
- Sunrise Hospital & Medical Center (access via Maryland Parkway)
- Las Vegas National Golf Club
- Boulder Station (access via Boulder Highway and Lamb Boulevard)
