= Jones Boulevard =

Road in Nevada

State Route 596
- Jones Boulevard
- SR 596 in blue, former SR 596 in green, remainder of Jones Boulevard in red

Route information
- Maintained by NDOT
- Length: 4.088 mi (6.579 km)
- Existed: July 1, 1976–present

Southern segment
- South end: Sahara Avenue at Las Vegas–Spring Valley line
- Major intersections: I-11 / US 95 in Las Vegas
- North end: Clarice Avenue in Las Vegas

Northern segment
- South end: Smoke Ranch Road in Las Vegas
- North end: US 95 Bus. / SR 599 / Alexander Road in Las Vegas

Location
- Country: United States
- State: Nevada
- County: Clark

Highway system
- Nevada State Highway System; Interstate; US; State; Pre‑1976; Scenic
← SR 595	→ SR 599

Jones Boulevard is a section line arterial that runs north and south through the Las Vegas Valley. A 4.088-mile (6.579 km) portion of the road is designated State Route 596 (SR 596).

== Route description ==
Jones Boulevard begins at the intersection of West Erie Ave as the continuation of Star Hills Avenue. It continues north from there towards Blue Diamond Road (SR 160) where Jones Boulevard continues across the Las Vegas Valley to Rancho Drive, where Jones Boulevard ends as the roadway turns east to continue as Alexander Road. Jones Boulevard resumes again just north of here, at another intersection of Rancho Drive and Alexander Road, and continues northward until reaching its final terminus just north of its intersection with Jalisco Avenue.

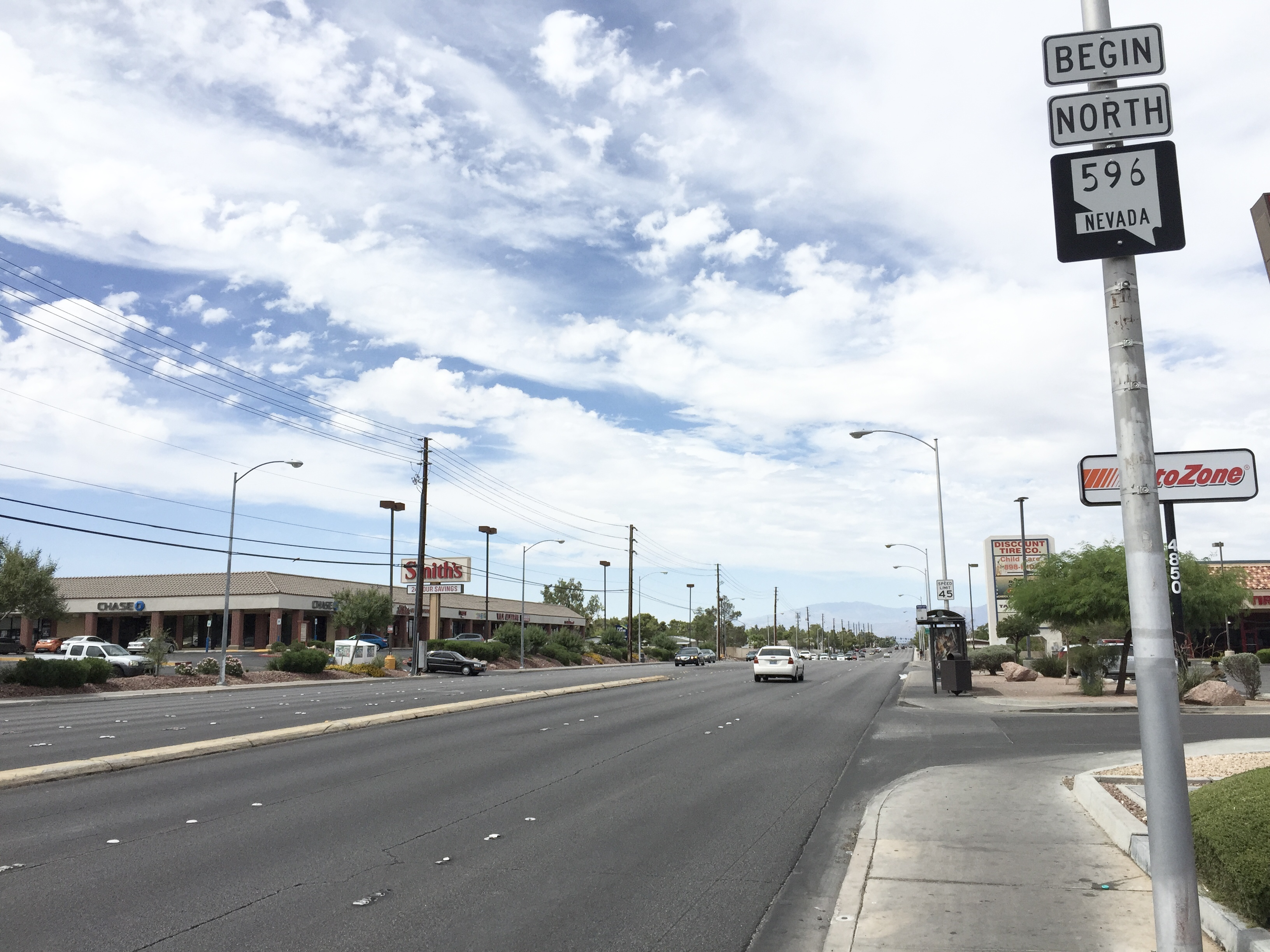
View north from the south end of SR 596 as seen in 2015

State Route 596 begins at Sahara Avenue (former SR 589) and runs north along Jones Boulevard until reaching an intersection with Aldebaran Avenue, just north of I-11/U.S. 95. SR 596 resumes at Smoke Ranch Road and continues on Jones Boulevard until reaching its northern terminus at SR 599 (Rancho Drive). State Route 596's length is 4.119 miles (6.629 km).

== History ==
In 1996, SR 596 was defined to extend from Tropicana Avenue (SR 593) north to Rancho Drive (SR 599).

By 2001, SR 596 was decommissioned between Sahara Avenue and Charleston Boulevard. As late as 2006, SR 596 was officially defined to exist in two sections. The southern section began at Tropicana Avenue and ran north along Jones Boulevard 3.061 miles (4.926 km) to the Las Vegas city limits at Sahara Avenue. The northern section resumed at Charleston Boulevard (SR 159) and continued 3.026 miles (4.870 km) north to its terminus at Smoke Ranch Road. As of 2008, the discontinuous section was reincorporated into the route mileage.

The Nevada Department of Transportation (NDOT) removed the portion of SR 596 between Tropicana Avenue and Sahara Avenue from its maintenance logs in 2019 and had begun the process of transferring ownership of this portion of the roadway to Clark County. By at most 2025, the segment between Smoke Ranch Road and Rancho Drive was re-designated SR 596, with the segment between Clarice Avenue (just north of I-11) and Smoke Ranch Road being removed from the state highway.

== Major intersections ==
The entire route is in Clark County.

Location	mi	km	Destinations	Notes
Enterprise	0.0	0.0	Starr Hills Avenue south	Continuation beyond southern terminus
Enterprise	0.0	0.0	Erie Avenue west / Shinnecock Hills Avenue east	Western terminus of Shinnecock Hills Avenue; southern terminus of Jones Boulevard
Enterprise	0.3	0.48	Levi Avenue west / Somerset Hills Avenue east	
Enterprise	0.5	0.80	Cactus Avenue	
Enterprise	1.5	2.4	Silverado Ranch Boulevard east	Western terminus of Silverado Ranch Boulevard
Enterprise	2.4	3.9	SR 160 (Blue Diamond Road)	Intersection opened in 2025
Enterprise	3.5	5.6	Windmill Lane	
Enterprise	4.0	6.4	Robindale Road	
Enterprise	4.5	7.2	Warm Springs Road	
Enterprise	4.9	7.9	Badura Avenue	
Enterprise	5.2– 5.3	8.4– 8.5	Future I-215 / CC 215 – Henderson	CC 215 exit 14
Enterprise–Spring Valley line	5.5	8.9	Sunset Road	
Spring Valley	6.0	9.7	Patrick Lane	
Spring Valley	6.5	10.5	Russell Road	
Spring Valley	6.8	10.9	Bridge over Tropicana Wash	
Spring Valley	7.0	11.3	Hacienda Avenue	
Spring Valley	7.5	12.1	Tropicana Avenue	Former southern terminus of SR 596
Spring Valley	7.8	12.6	Bridge over Flamingo Wash	
Spring Valley	8.0	12.9	Harmon Avenue	
Spring Valley	8.5	13.7	SR 592 (Flamingo Road)	
Spring Valley	9.0	14.5	Twain Avenue	
Spring Valley	9.3	15.0	Spring Mountain Road	
Spring Valley	9.5	15.3	Desert Inn Road	
Spring Valley	10.1	16.3	Edna Avenue	
Las Vegas–Spring Valley line	10.6	17.1	Sahara Avenue	Southern terminus of SR 596; former SR 589
Las Vegas	11.1	17.9	Oakey Boulevard	Serves College of Southern Nevada (Charleston Campus)
Las Vegas	11.5	18.5	Transverse Drive	Serves Desert Regional Center
Las Vegas	11.7	18.8	Charleston Boulevard	Former SR 159
Las Vegas	12.1	19.5	Alta Drive	
Las Vegas	12.6– 12.7	20.3– 20.4	I-11 / US 95 / Upland Boulevard south – Downtown Las Vegas, Tonopah, Reno	Interchange; I-11/US 95 exit 80; Jones Boulevard changes signage from "South" to "North"
Las Vegas	12.8	20.6	Clarice Avenue	Northern terminus of southern segment of SR 596
Las Vegas	13.1	21.1	Washington Avenue	
Las Vegas	13.7	22.0	Vegas Drive	
Las Vegas	14.2	22.9	Lake Mead Boulevard	
Las Vegas	14.7	23.7	Smoke Ranch Road	Southern terminus of northern segment of SR 596
Las Vegas	15.7	25.3	Cheyenne Avenue	Former SR 574
Las Vegas	16.7	26.9	US 95 Bus. / SR 599 (Rancho Drive) / Alexander Road east	Northern terminus of SR 596
Las Vegas	Gap in route			
Las Vegas	16.7	26.9	US 95 Bus. / SR 599 (Rancho Drive) / Alexander Road west	
1.000 mi = 1.609 km; 1.000 km = 0.621 mi

== Public transport ==
RTC Transit Route 102 functions on this road.
