= Andesite Vineyard =

Vineyard in Napa Valley, California

Andesite Vineyard is a Spring Mountain District, Napa Valley vineyard at the 2000-foot level of Spring Mountain, 5 miles up Spring Mountain Road from St. Helena.

== Soils ==
Soil at the top of Spring Mountain is very rocky and excellent for grapes. Andesite is one of the most abundant volcanic rocks in the Bay Area, and the top of Spring Mountain is primarily composed of Andesite. The Andesite Vineyard property is the 14-acre heart of the old Robinson property.

== Vines ==
The planted area is a mountain saddle of three acres of Merlot and Cabernet Sauvignon. The Merlot is primarily east- and a bit south-facing; the Cab primarily north and a bit west.

== Wines ==
Andesite Vineyard's three-acre annual production is about 150 cases.
