= Nevada State Route 599 =

Highway in Nevada

State Route 599/U.S. Route 95 Business
- Rancho Drive
- SR 599 in red, former section in blue

Route information
- Maintained by NDOT
- Length: 6.788 mi (10.924 km)
- Existed: July 1, 1976–present

Major junctions
- South end: Desert Inn Road at the Las Vegas–Paradise–Winchester tripointe
- I-15; SR 589 east; SR 599; Future I-215 / CC 215
- North end: I-11 / US 95

SR 599
- South end: Mesquite Avenue in Las Vegas
- Major intersections: I-11 / US 95 in Las Vegas; SR 579 east; SR 596 south; SR 574
- North end: I-11 / US 95 / 0.171 mi (275 m) north of Rainbow Boulevard

US 95 Bus.
- South end: I-11 / US 95 in Las Vegas
- Major intersections: SR 579 east; SR 596 south; SR 574; Future I-215 / CC 215
- North end: I-11 / US 95

Location
- Country: United States
- State: Nevada
- County: Clark

Highway system
- United States Numbered Highway System; List; Special; Divided; Nevada State Highway System; Interstate; US; State; Pre‑1976; Scenic
← SR 596	→ SR 602

Rancho Drive
- Entire route of Rancho Drive in gray
- Part of: SR 599 US 95 Bus.
- Type: Primary road
- Length: 10.8 mi (17.4 km)
- Addresses: 3300 S to 5000 N
- South end: Desert Inn Road at Las Vegas–Paradise line
- North end: I-11 / US 95 / Ann Road in Las Vegas

State Route 599 (SR 599) is a 7.049-mile (11.344 km) state highway in Clark County, Nevada. The route follows Rancho Drive, a major arterial connecting downtown Las Vegas to the northwest part of the city. Much of SR 599 was previously designated as U.S. Route 95 (US 95) prior to completion of the Las Vegas Expressway. The route is also designated as U.S. Route 95 Business (US 95 Bus.).

== Route description ==
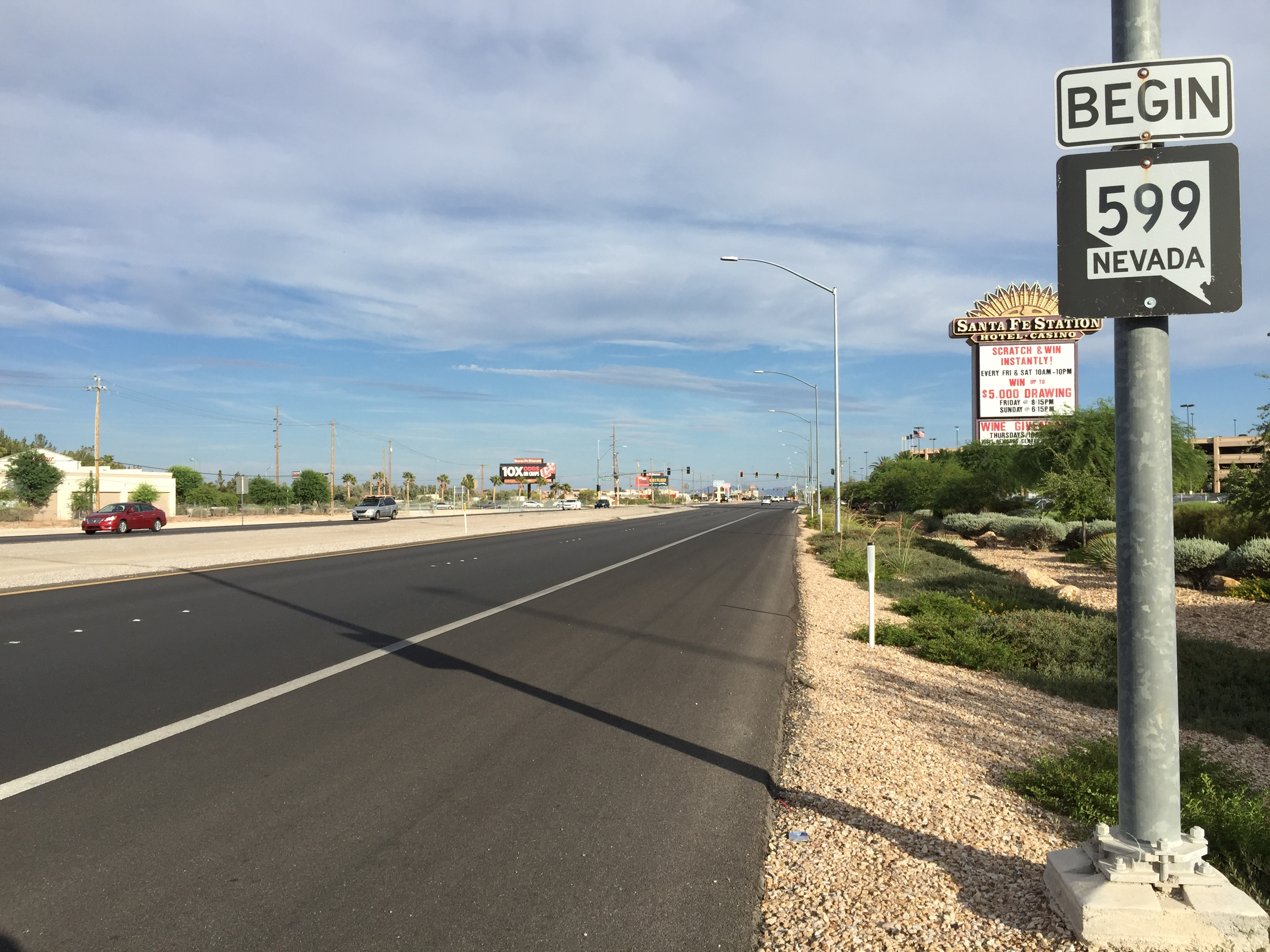
View at the north end of SR 599 looking southbound as seen in 2015

SR 599 begins at the intersection of Rancho Drive and Mesquite Avenue in the city of Las Vegas. From there, the route heads north along Rancho Drive to intersect the I-11/US 95 freeway (at exit 38). The highway continues heading northwest for several miles, briefly skirting the western edge of North Las Vegas and providing access to the North Las Vegas Airport. The route reaches its northern terminus at the end of Rancho Drive, at the interchange with I-11/US 95 north and Ann Road (at exits 48 and 50).

I-11 and US 95 freeway signs for Rancho Drive designate the route as U.S. Route 95 Business, a distinction noted on many maps (including those published by the Nevada Department of Transportation (NDOT)). However, no business route signs are posted along the highway itself and relatively few SR 599 shields can be found on the route.

== History ==
Rancho Drive originally carried State Route 5 from Bonanza Road (present–day State Route 579) northwest out of Las Vegas towards Tonopah—this destination contributed to the road's alternate name of Tonopah Highway. When US 95 was extended into Nevada on January 1, 1940, it was routed concurrently with SR 5 on Rancho Drive. The U.S. route remained on Rancho Drive until it was relocated onto the completed Las Vegas Expressway in the early 1980s. SR 599 was designated along the former US 95/SR 5 at this time, in accordance with the 1976 renumbering of Nevada's State Routes.

SR 599 lost mileage between 1996 and 2000. In 2006, the route was pending removal from the state highway system to be transferred to the City of Las Vegas for maintenance, but this has not happened as of January 2008. By October 2011, the southern terminus of SR 599 had been moved from Sahara Avenue to Redondo Avenue, shortening the overall mileage to the current length.

== Major intersections ==
The entire route is in Clark County. All exits are unnumbered.

Location	mi	km	Destinations	Notes
Las Vegas	0.000	0.000	Rancho Drive south	Continuation beyond southern terminus; former SR 599 south/US 95 Alt. south
Las Vegas	0.000	0.000	Mesquite Avenue	Southern terminus of SR 599
Las Vegas			I-11 / US 95 (Purple Heart Highway) to I-15	Interchange; southern terminus of US 95 Business; I-11/US 95 exit 77
Las Vegas			Bonanza Road (SR 579 east)	Former US 95 south
Las Vegas–North Las Vegas line			Lake Mead Boulevard	
Las Vegas–North Las Vegas line			Decatur Boulevard	
Las Vegas			Cheyenne Avenue (SR 574)	
Las Vegas			Craig Road (SR 573)	
Las Vegas			Rainbow Boulevard	Serves Santa Fe Station
Las Vegas			Southern end of freeway	
Las Vegas	6.788	10.924	Ann Road	Northbound exit and southbound entrance; Ann Road provides access to I-11/US 95 north exit 90B and south exit 91B
Las Vegas	6.788	10.924	I-11 north / US 95 north (Purple Heart Highway)	Northern terminus; I-11/US 95 north exit 90A and south exit 91B
1.000 mi = 1.609 km; 1.000 km = 0.621 mi

== Public transport ==
RTC Transit Routes 106A, 106B, and 119 function on this road.

== See also ==
- List of U.S. Routes in Nevada
