= Flamingo Road (Las Vegas) =

Road in Las Vegas

State Route 592
- Flamingo Road
- SR 592 in red, remainder of Flamingo Road in blue

Route information
- Maintained by NDOT
- Length: 8.471 mi (13.633 km)
- Existed: July 1, 1976–present

Section 1
- Length: 3.577 mi (5.757 km)
- West end: SR 595 in Spring Valley
- East end: I-15 in Paradise

Section 2
- Length: 4.894 mi (7.876 km)
- West end: Paradise Road in Paradise
- Major intersections: I-11 / US 93 / US 95 in Paradise
- East end: SR 582 in Whitney

Location
- Country: United States
- State: Nevada
- County: Clark

Highway system
- Nevada State Highway System; Interstate; US; State; Pre‑1976; Scenic
← SR 589	→ SR 593

Flamingo Road is an east–west section line arterial in the Las Vegas Valley. The road is named after Flamingo Las Vegas, which is located on Las Vegas Boulevard near where it intersects with Flamingo Road. Two discontinuous segments of the road totaling 8.487 miles (13.659 km) are designated State Route 592 (SR 592).

== SR 592 route description ==
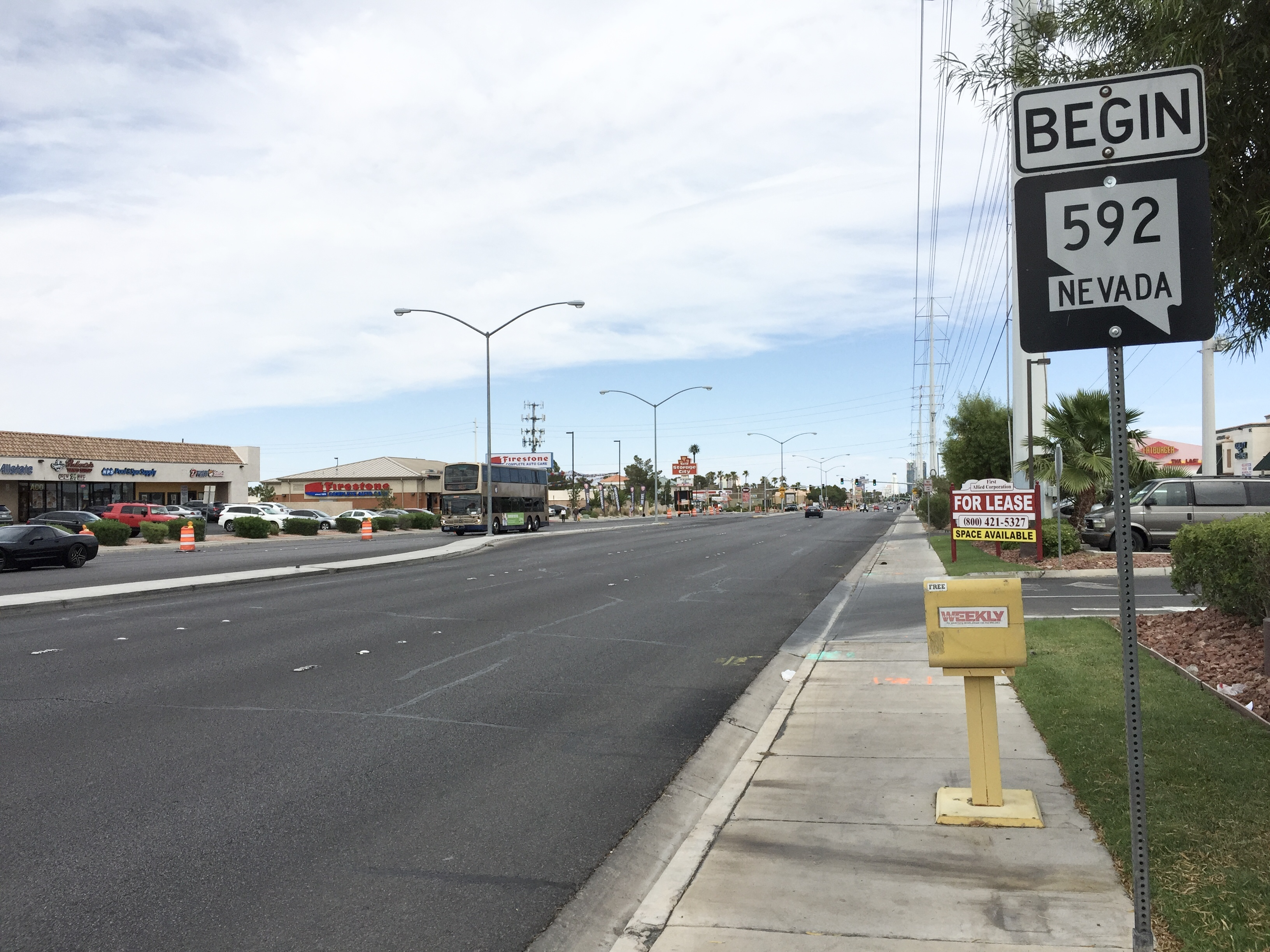
View at the west end of SR 592 looking eastbound as seen in 2015

The first portion of SR 592 begins at Rainbow Boulevard (SR 595) and extends easterly to Interstate 15. The second section resumes at Paradise Road and continues east, skirting the northern edge of the University of Nevada, Las Vegas (UNLV) campus before reaching its terminus at Boulder Highway (SR 582).

== History ==
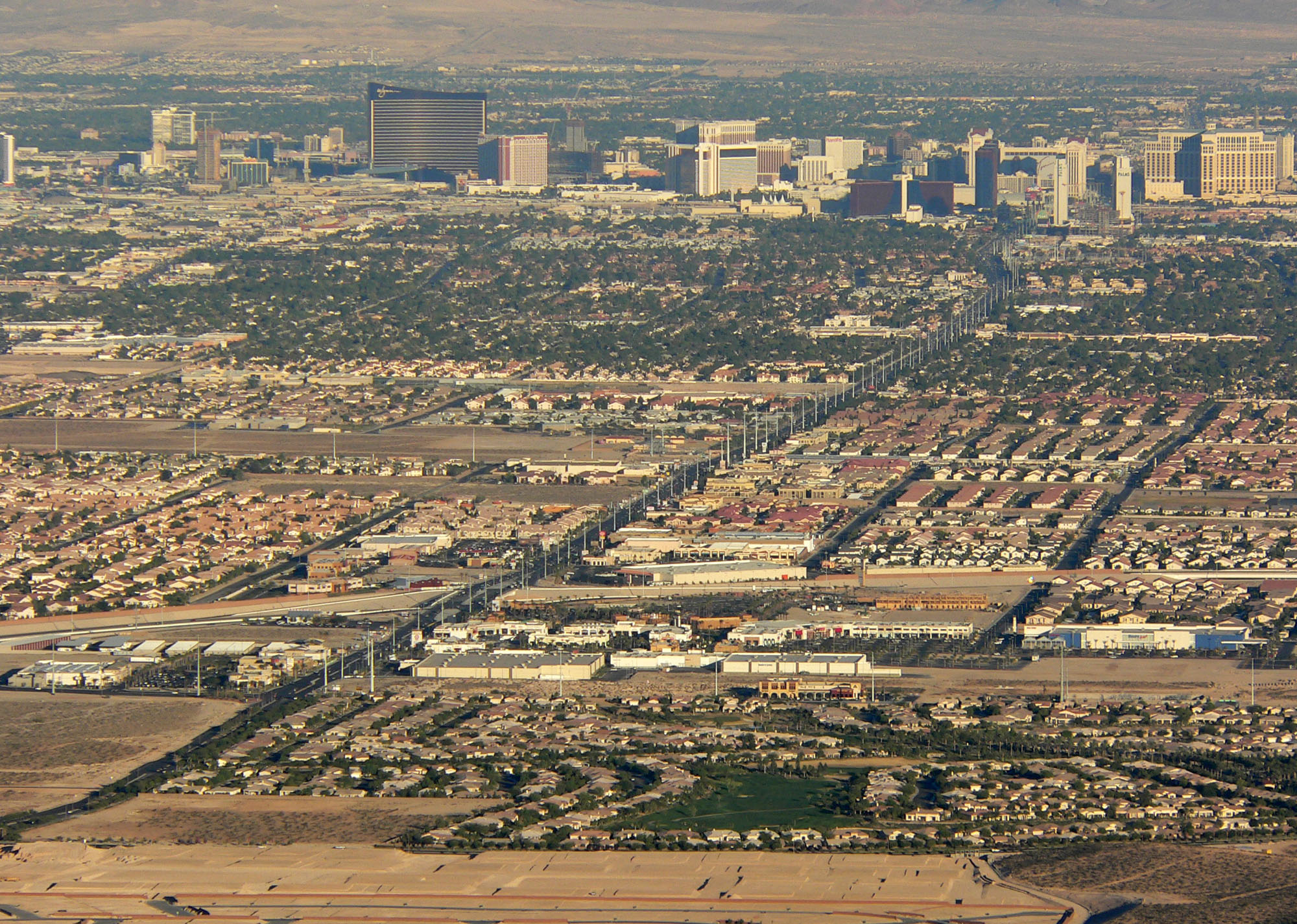
Western half of Flamingo Road from the Strip to I-215 as seen in 2006

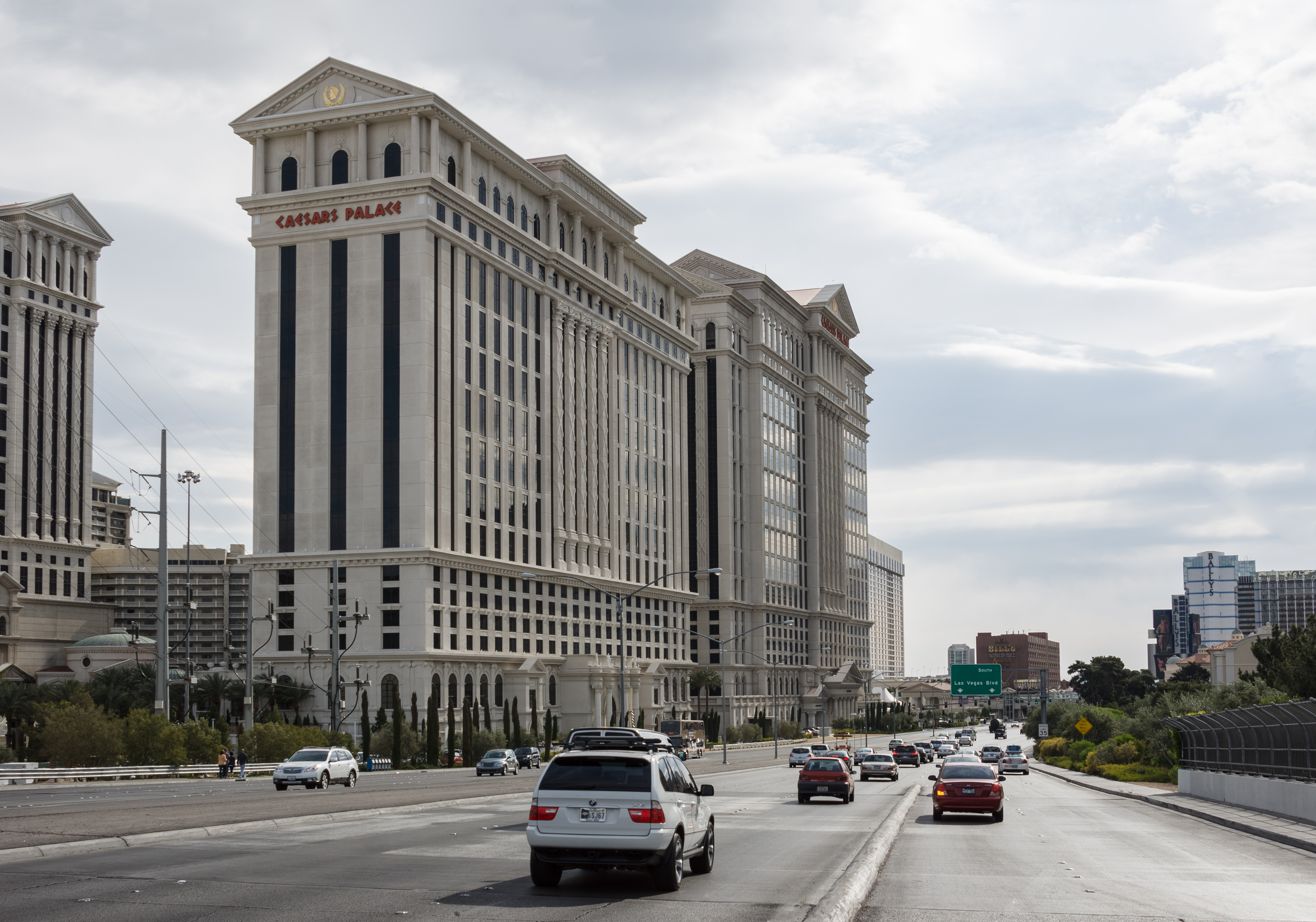
Flamingo Road near Caesars Palace as seen in 2012

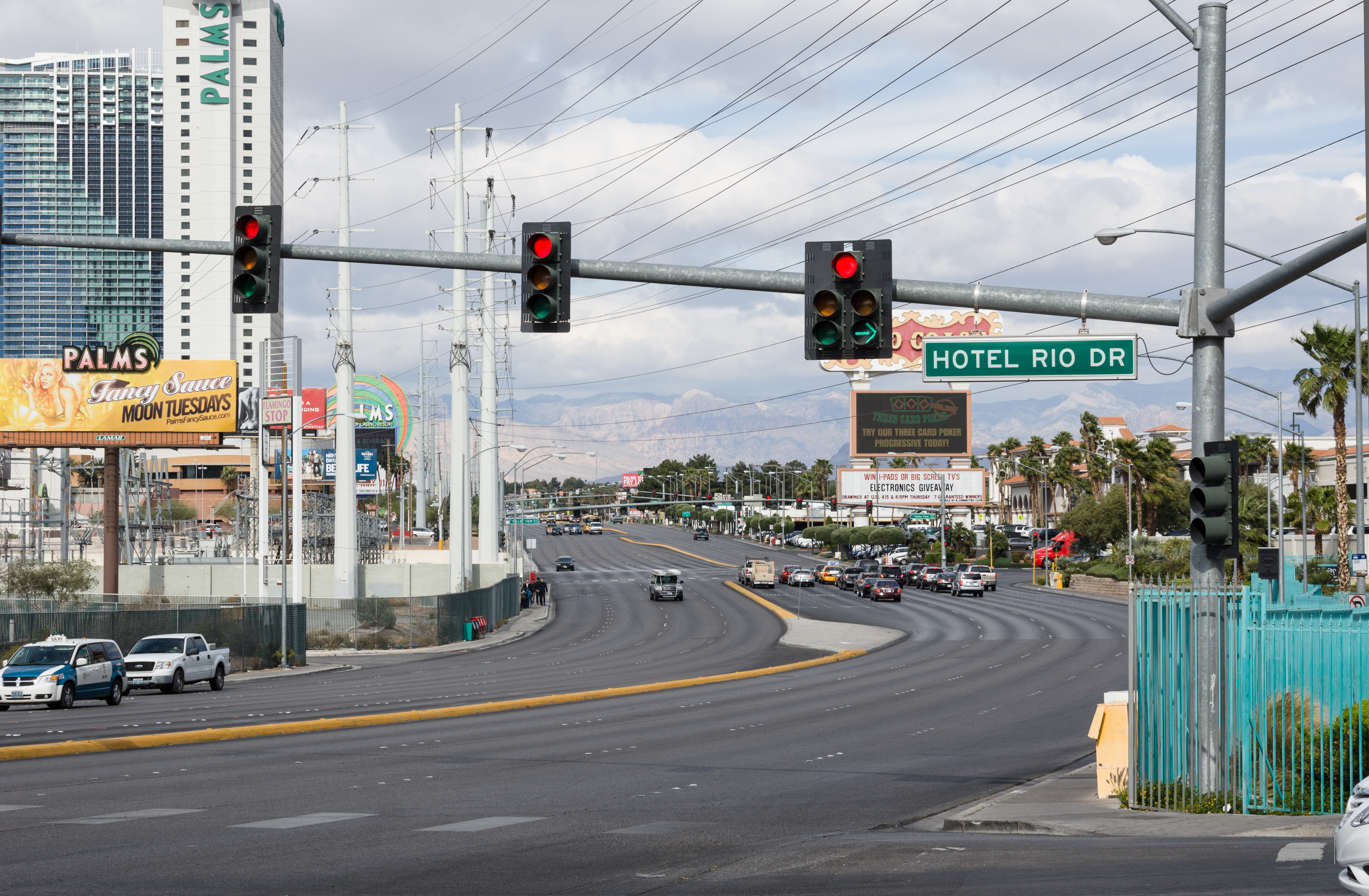
Flamingo Road and Hotel Rio Drive intersection as seen in 2012

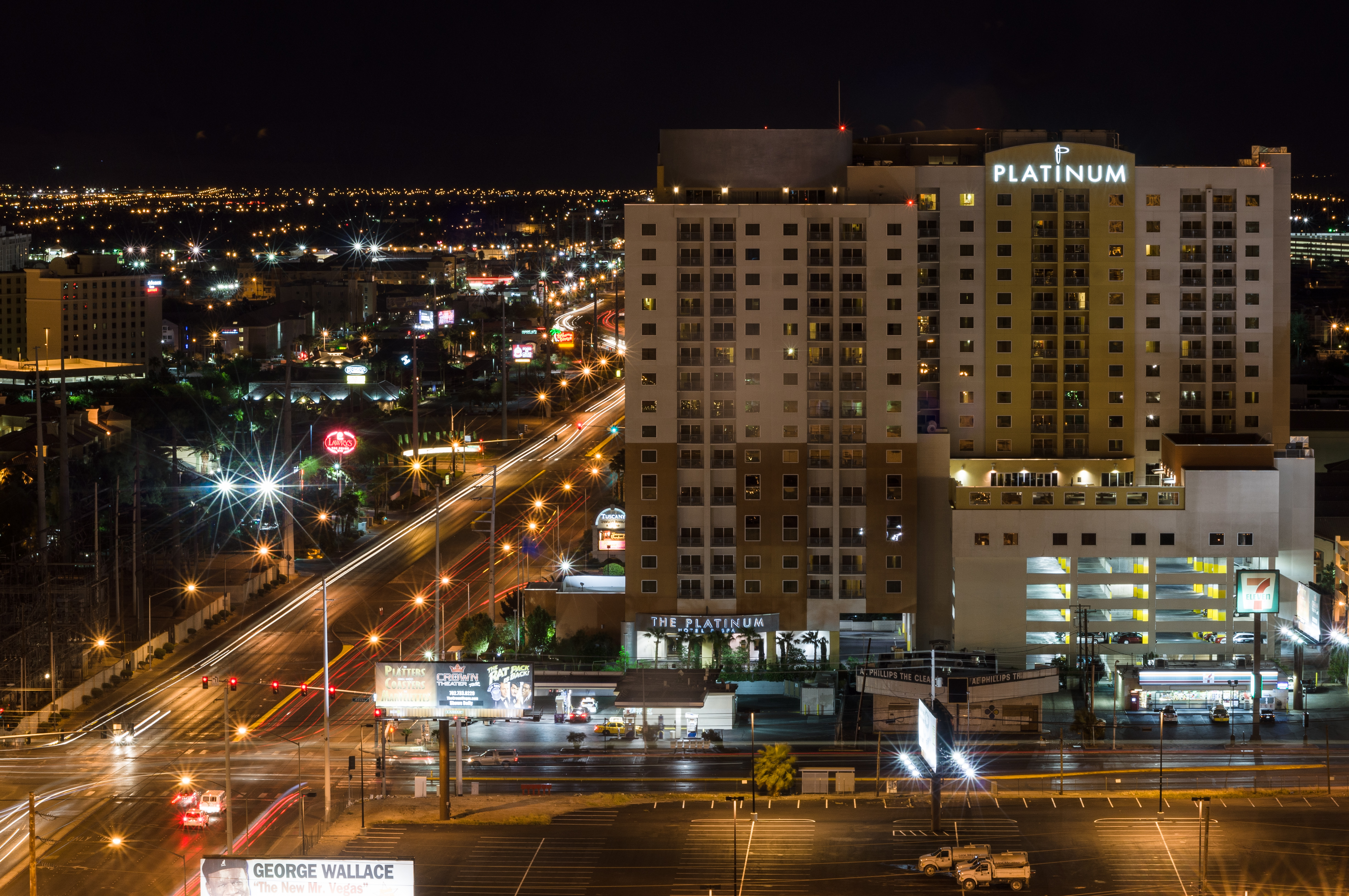
Flamingo Road near The Platinum condo hotel as seen in 2012

Flamingo Road originally was called Monson Road, and only existed east of Las Vegas Boulevard, with a nearby street, Dunes Road connecting Las Vegas Boulevard with Interstate 15 (I-15). In the early 1980s, the Nevada Department of Transportation rebuilt the Dunes interchange at I-15, and constructed a six-lane Flamingo Road west to Rainbow Boulevard.

The segment between I-15 and Las Vegas Boulevard remained named Dunes-Flamingo Road until 1995.

The portion of SR 592 between I-15 and Paradise Road was decommissioned by 2008.

The route is a candidate to be decommissioned with control given to Clark County; however, only the above section located in the resort corridor has been relinquished in January 2008.

== Major intersections ==
The entire route is in Clark County.

Location	mi	km	Destinations	Notes
Spring Valley	0.000	0.000	Flamingo Road west	Continuation beyond western terminus
Spring Valley	0.000	0.000	Rainbow Boulevard (SR 595)	Western terminus
Spring Valley			Jones Boulevard (SR 596)	
Paradise–Spring Valley line			Decatur Boulevard	
Paradise	3.577	5.757	I-15 (Las Vegas Freeway) – Los Angeles, Salt Lake City	Interchange; I-15 exit 38
Gap in route
Paradise	0.000	0.000	Paradise Road	Former SR 605
Paradise			I-11 / US 93 / US 95 (Purple Heart Highway)	Interchange; I-11/US 95 exit 69; former I-515
Whitney	4.894	7.876	Boulder Highway (SR 582)	Eastern terminus; former US 93/US 95/US 466
Whitney	4.894	7.876	Flamingo Road east	Continuation beyond eastern terminus
1.000 mi = 1.609 km; 1.000 km = 0.621 mi

== Attractions ==
- Palms Casino Resort
- Gold Coast Hotel and Casino
- Bellagio (resort)
- Caesars Palace
- Bally's Las Vegas
- The Cromwell Las Vegas

== Public transport ==
RTC Transit Route 202 functions on this road. Bus-only lanes operate between Rainbow Boulevard and Arville Street, and Koval Lane and Boulder Highway.
