= Tropicana Avenue =

Highway in Nevada

State Route 593
- Tropicana Avenue
- SR 593 in blue, remainder of Tropicana Avenue in red

Route information
- Maintained by NDOT
- Length: 4.893 mi (7.875 km)
- Existed: July 1, 1976–present

Major junctions
- West end: Town Center Drive in Summerlin South
- Future I-215 / CC 215 in Spring Valley; SR 595 north in Spring Valley; SR 593 (western segment); LAS in Paradise; SR 593 (eastern segment)
- East end: Broadbent Boulevard / Wetlands Park Lane in Whitney near the Clark County Wetlands Park

SR 593 (western segment)
- West end: Dean Martin Drive in Paradise
- Major intersections: I-15 in Paradise
- East end: Las Vegas Boulevard in Paradise

SR 593 (eastern segment)
- West end: Maryland Parkway in Paradise
- Major intersections: I-11 / US 93 / US 95 in Paradise; SR 612 north at the Paradise–Whitney line
- East end: SR 582 in Whitney

Location
- Country: United States
- State: Nevada
- County: Clark

Highway system
- Nevada State Highway System; Interstate; US; State; Pre‑1976; Scenic
← SR 592	→ SR 595

Tropicana Avenue is a major east–west section line arterial in the Las Vegas area. The road is named after the former Tropicana Las Vegas which was located on Las Vegas Boulevard where it intersects with Tropicana Avenue. Part of it is signed as Nevada State Route 593 (SR 593).

== Route description ==
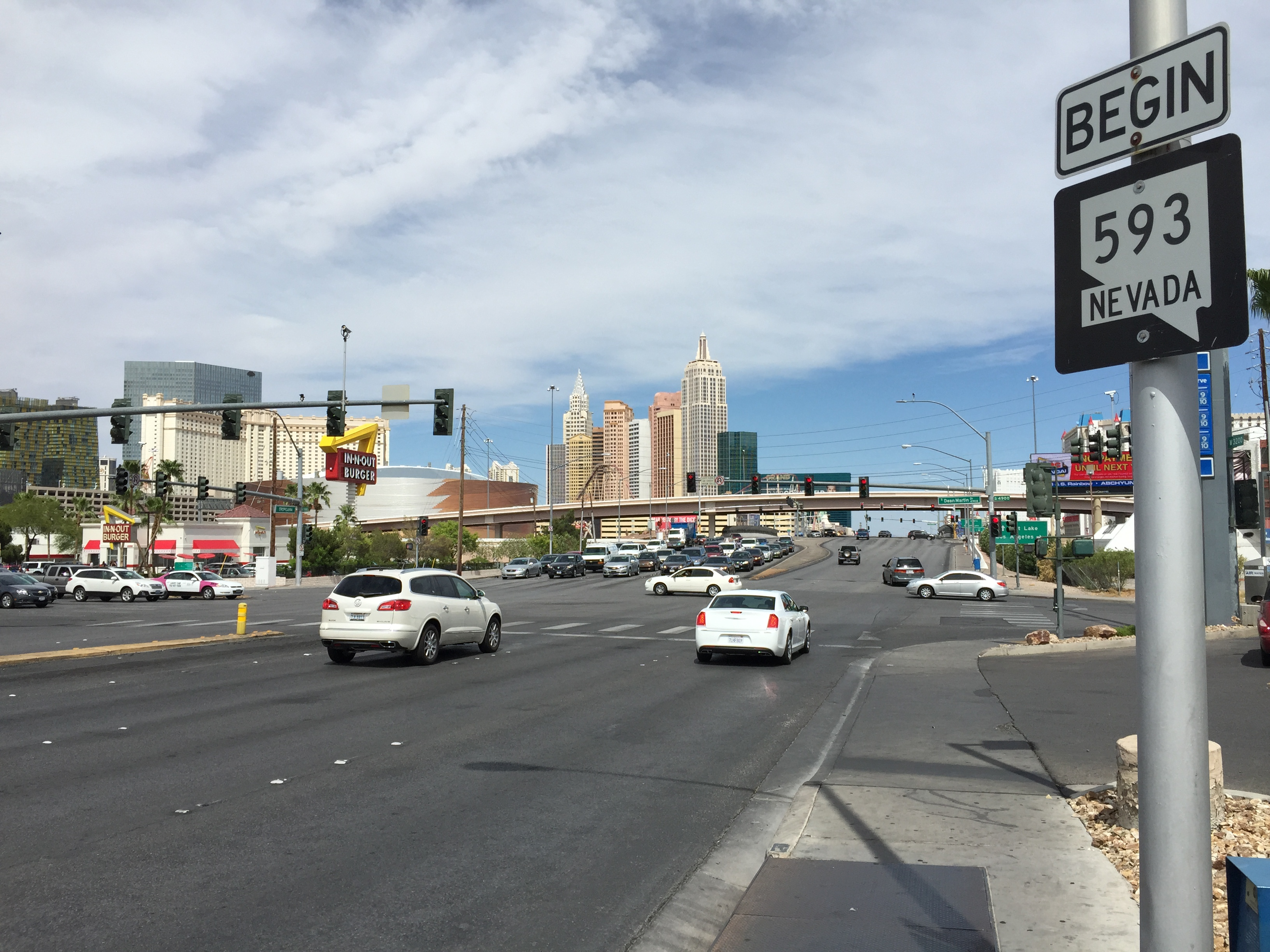
View east from the west end of SR 593 as seen in 2015

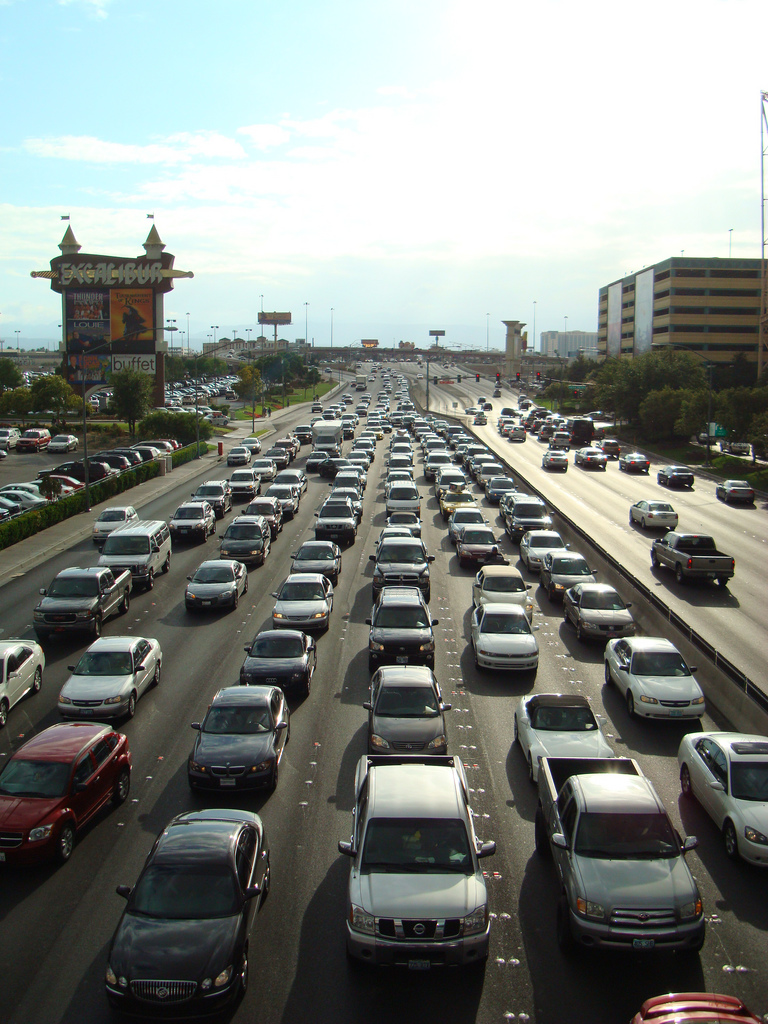
Looking west on Tropicana Avenue (SR 593) from the Las Vegas Strip as seen in 2008

SR 593 begins at Dean Martin Drive (formerly Industrial Road) in the unincorporated town of Paradise. From there, the highway travels east over Interstate 15 and crosses Las Vegas Boulevard (former SR 604) in the Las Vegas Strip. The highway continues east past the Las Vegas Strip where the highway intersects at Paradise Road (southbound) (former SR 605)/Swenson Street (northbound). Paradise Road provides access to Harry Reid International Airport (south of the Tropicana Avenue and Paradise Road intersection) and SR 593 serves as the southern end of the University of Nevada, Las Vegas (UNLV) campus (including the Thomas & Mack Center). SR 593 continues following Tropicana Avenue east at the junction of Interstate 11 and U.S. Routes 93 and 95. About a mile from the I-11, U.S. Route 93 and U.S. Route 95 junction, SR 593 has an intersection at Nellis Boulevard (SR 612) where the highway enters the unincorporated town of Whitney just before terminating at Boulder Highway (SR 582).

Much of Tropicana Avenue is designated as a part of the National Highway System (NHS). SR 593 from Dean Martin Drive to Boulder Highway comprises the state maintained portion of this NHS routing. Tropicana Avenue between Rainbow Boulevard (SR 595) and Dean Martin Drive is a locally maintained part of the NHS.

== History ==
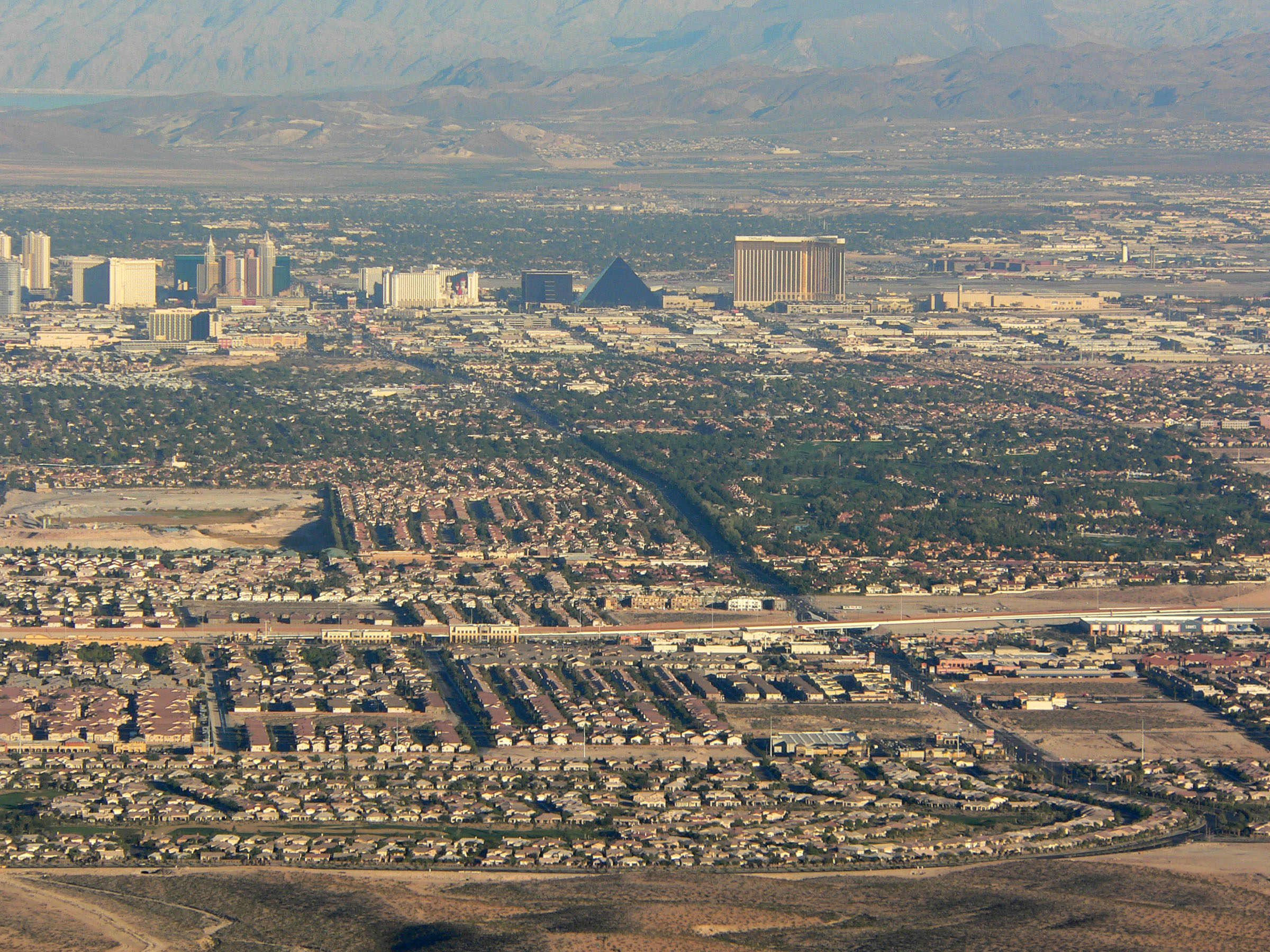
Western half of Tropicana Avenue as seen in 2006

Tropicana was originally named Bond Road before it was renamed after a hotel and casino adjacent to the street.

The state maintained portion of Tropicana Avenue previously extended from its current terminus west to Rainbow Boulevard (SR 595). This portion of SR 593 had been relinquished to Clark County in 2006.

== Major intersections ==
The entire route is in Clark County.

Location	mi	km	Destinations	Notes
Paradise	0.000	0.000	Tropicana Avenue west	Continuation beyond western terminus; former SR 593 west
Paradise	0.000	0.000	Dean Martin Drive	Western terminus; formerly Industrial Road
Paradise			I-15 (Las Vegas Freeway) – Los Angeles, Salt Lake City	Interchange; I-15 exits 36 and 37
Paradise			Las Vegas Boulevard	Former SR 604/US 91/US 466
Paradise			Paradise Road	One-way southbound; former SR 605; serves Harry Reid International Airport
Paradise			I-11 / US 93 / US 95 (Purple Heart Highway)	Interchange; I-11/US 95 exit 68; former I-515
Paradise			Nellis Boulevard (SR 612)	
Whitney	4.893	7.875	Boulder Highway (SR 582)	Eastern terminus; former US 93/US 95/US 466
Whitney	4.893	7.875	Tropicana Avenue east	Continuation beyond eastern terminus
1.000 mi = 1.609 km; 1.000 km = 0.621 mi

== Attractions ==
Notable attractions along the road include:

- The Orleans
- Excalibur Hotel and Casino
- New York-New York Hotel and Casino
- MGM Grand Las Vegas
- Oyo Hotel & Casino
- Liberace Museum Collection

== Public transport ==
RTC Transit Routes 201, 601 & 602 function on this road.
