= Interstate 11 =

Interstate Highway in the U.S. state of Nevada

Interstate 11
- Purple Heart Highway
- I-11 highlighted in red

Route information
- Maintained by NDOT
- Length: 54.193 mi (87.215 km)
- Existed: August 16, 2017–present
- NHS: Entire route

Major junctions
- South end: Future I-11 / US 93 at the Arizona state line
- US 95 / SR 173 in Boulder City; US 93 Bus. in Henderson; I-215 / SR 564 in Henderson; I-15 / US 93 in Las Vegas; SR 613 / SR 595 in Las Vegas; US 95 Bus. / SR 599 in Las Vegas; CC 215 in Las Vegas
- North end: Future I-11 / US 95 / SR 157 in Las Vegas

Location
- Country: United States
- State: Nevada
- Counties: Clark

Highway system
- Interstate Highway System; Main; Auxiliary; Suffixed; Business; Future; Nevada State Highway System; Interstate; US; State; Pre‑1976; Scenic
← US 6	→ I-15

Interstate 11 (I-11), officially known as the Purple Heart Highway, is an Interstate Highway that runs for 54.193 miles (87.215 km) on a predominantly northwest–southeast alignment in the U.S. state of Nevada. It runs concurrently with either or both US 93 and US 95 from the Arizona state line (at the Mike O'Callaghan–Pat Tillman Memorial Bridge over the Colorado River within the Lake Mead National Recreation Area outside of the city limits of Boulder City) to Kyle Canyon Road (SR 157) and Sunstone Parkway in Las Vegas.

The freeway is tentatively planned to run from Nogales, Arizona, to Fernley, Nevada, generally following the current routes of I-19, I-10, US 93, and US 95. Planners anticipate upgrading four existing highway segments to carry future I-11: US 93 in Arizona (from Kingman to the Nevada state line and from Kingman to Wickenburg), US 95 in Nevada (from the Las Vegas Valley to Schurz), and either US 95 (via Fallon) or US 95 Alt (via Yerington) from Schurtz to Fernley. The most recent extension came in 2024, when officials replaced I-515 signs in Las Vegas with I-11 signs and added I-11 signs on US 95 north of Downtown Las Vegas, which extended I-11 northward about 30.5 miles (49.1 km). An extension of the Interstate northward along US 95 to Mercury, Nevada, is planned after that. An exact alignment for I-11 south of Wickenburg has yet to be determined; a number of corridor alternatives, however, have been identified for further study and refinement.

The building of I-11 in Arizona as a freeway bypass from I-19 in Sahuarita to US 93 in Wickenburg is controversial. It is currently facing fierce local opposition and backlash from conservation groups and others, citing costs and environmental, traffic, economic, and safety concerns. The project is on hold pending litigation as of 2025.

The numbering of this highway did not initially fit within the usual conventions of the existing Interstate Highway grid, as the whole route was east of I-15. This was because I-17 was already built to the east of the I-11 alignment in Arizona, leaving no odd number between 15 and 17 as would be required by the conventions. I-11's extension along US 95 through Las Vegas and crossing over I-15 remedied this situation since it put a portion of I-11 west of I-15, in line with the national grid numbering conventions.

== Route description ==
The highway currently begins at the Arizona state line at the Mike O'Callaghan–Pat Tillman Memorial Bridge, then runs along the 15-mile (24 km) Boulder City Bypass around Boulder City, which opened on August 9, 2018. It is signed concurrently with US 93 throughout. An at-grade intersection just north of the Buchanan Boulevard overpass is for emergency vehicles only. At mile 14, I-11 intersects and joins with US 95 heading north. Continuing northwest, the highway runs along the former I-515 around Henderson to the Henderson Spaghetti Bowl interchange with I-215 and Lake Mead Parkway (SR 564).

On May 21, 2024, I-11 was extended through the Las Vegas Valley along US 93/US 95 (the rest of the alignment of former I-515) to Downtown Las Vegas and I-15, then running concurrently with US 95 northwest to SR 157. When this segment was designated, I-515 was decommissioned. Studies to extend I-11 from SR 157 northward to Mercury were started in late 2023.

From I-15 to Elkhorn Road, I-11 and US 95 have HOV lanes that are currently enforced by both LVMPD (aka Metro) and NSP (formerly NHP).

== History ==
As recently as 1997, US 93 was mostly a two-lane road between Wickenburg and Hoover Dam and was known for its dangerous curves and hills in the stretch between Wickenburg and I-40. In the late 1990s, the Arizona Department of Transportation (ADOT) began widening US 93 to four lanes and, in some areas, building a completely new roadway. In other places along the route, ADOT simply repaved the old highway and built two new lanes parallel to it. ADOT also began studying the possibility of adding grade separations to US 93 near the Santa Maria River to make the road a full freeway.

At the same time, Nevada and Arizona began looking at US 93's crossing of Hoover Dam, a major bottleneck for regional commerce, with hairpin turns, multiple crosswalks for pedestrians, and steep grades. Plans for a bridge to bypass the dam became even more urgent when the road was closed to trucks after the September 11 attacks in 2001, forcing commercial traffic to detour through Bullhead City, Arizona, and Laughlin, Nevada, causing major transport delays as a result.

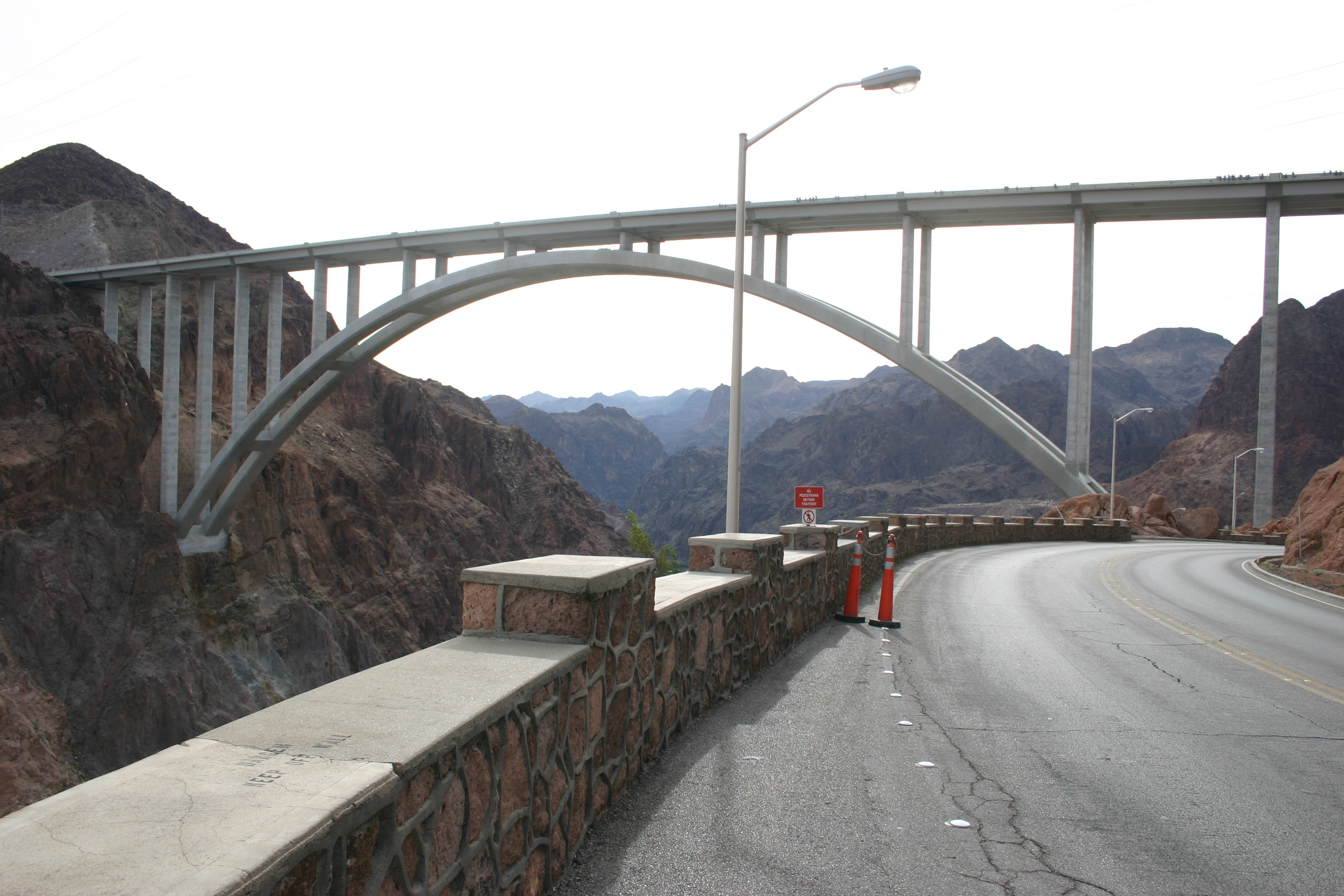
The Mike O'Callaghan–Pat Tillman Memorial Bridge, a completed alignment of I-11 near Hoover Dam in 2010

With the completion of the Mike O'Callaghan–Pat Tillman Memorial Bridge on October 14, 2010, the vast majority of the roadway was now a four-lane divided highway. Still, with Phoenix and Las Vegas as the two largest neighboring cities in the U.S. not connected by an Interstate, leaders in both cities lobbied to include I-11 in the next Transportation Equity Act for the 21st Century re-authorization. With the rise of the concept of "megapolitan" urban regions, I-11 is considered a key connector to unify the triangle formed by Las Vegas, Phoenix, and the Los Angeles area (the triangle consisting of I-15 to the north/west, I-10 to the south, and I-11 on the east). The Federal Highway Administration (FHWA) approved the Nevada Department of Transportation (NDOT)'s environmental review of a bypass around Boulder City, which would connect the end of the recently-constructed Hoover Dam Bypass bridge east of Boulder City to I-515 west of the town.

In December 2013, University of Nevada, Las Vegas, researchers discovered naturally-occurring asbestos along the route of the Boulder City Bypass. Containing the asbestos and monitoring the surrounding air to keep workers safe was estimated to cost at least an additional $12 million (equivalent to $15.9 million in 2024). Work was completed without any Occupational Safety and Health Administration incidents, with 14,000 air samples taken during the construction.

On March 21, 2014, "Future I-11 Corridor" signs were installed along the US 93 corridor. On May 21, 2014, NDOT submitted an application to the American Association of State Highway and Transportation Officials (AASHTO) to request the creation of the I-11 designation between the Arizona state line and the I-215/I-515 Interchange in Henderson. AASHTO approved this request at their Spring 2014 Special Committee on US Route Numbering meeting, contingent on FHWA approval. On June 13, 2017, the advisory question regarding the extension of Buchanan Boulevard to I-11—including interchange plans—via Boulder City Question 2 were opposed by voters. On August 16, 2017, the first southbound segment was opened to traffic, with its accompanying northbound segment opening on January 27, 2018. On February 20, 2018, NDOT opened additional ramps connecting the new Railroad Pass Casino Road to both the Boulder City Parkway (formerly US 93 and US 95, now US 93 Business) and to I-11 (southbound exit and northbound entrance). The final portion of Phase 1—between the new casino access road and US 95—opened on May 23, 2018. On August 9, 2018, Phase 2 was opened to traffic, officially completing the Boulder City Bypass.

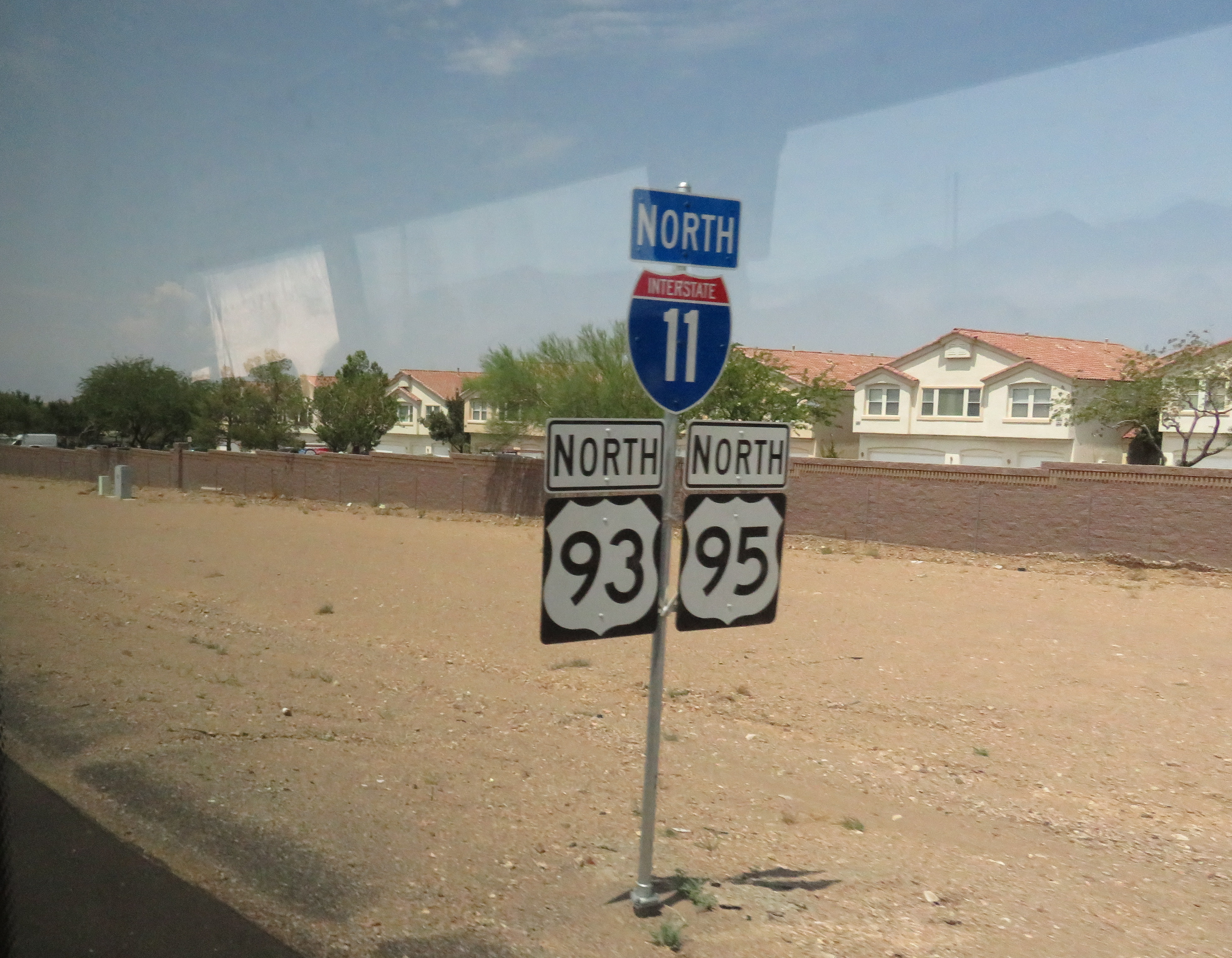
I-11 sign in Henderson with US 93/US 95 shields in 2018

Phase 2, which began construction on April 6, 2015, was expected to open by October 2018; in May 2018, however, the Regional Transportation Commission of Southern Nevada (RTC) announced that the section would be open by June 2018, three months ahead of schedule. That opening date was subsequently pushed back to August 9, 2018, as it was still in the post-construction stage. In March 2019, NDOT replaced I-515 signs along its southernmost five miles (8.0 km) with I-11 signs.

The 80th session of the Nevada Legislature unanimously passed a bill designating the entire route of I-11 in the state as the Purple Heart Highway, which went into effect on July 1, 2019.

On June 20, 2022, NDOT decided to route I-11 along the existing alignments of I-515/US 93/US 95 to Downtown Las Vegas, then running concurrently with US 95 northwest to SR 157 rather than use I-215 or construct a new corridor as had been proposed but abandoned due to opposition. NDOT replaced I-515 shields with I-11 shields within the Las Vegas Valley in 2024 and 2025. This extended I-11 northward about 30.5 miles (49.1 km) and eliminated the I-515 designation.

Beginning in 2022, several construction projects were started or planned to improve the I-515 corridor before it became I-11. The projects included soundwall and retaining wall reconstruction, bridge rehabilitation and interchange improvements. All the projects are expected to be started by 2027.

== Current status ==
As of January 2026, I-11 is entirely in Clark County, Nevada, extending from the Arizona state line on the Hoover Dam Bypass through Las Vegas to SR 157 northwest of the city. An extension to Mercury is currently being planned. The Nevada portion of the original I-11 corridor is a full freeway that meets current Interstate Highway standards from the Mike O'Callaghan–Pat Tillman Memorial Bridge on US 93 to the northwest of Las Vegas on US 95. While the bulk of US 93 through Arizona has been widened to four lanes, some portions of the corridor are not built to Interstate Highway standards, as there are scattered at-grade intersections, substandard roadway and shoulder widths, median crossovers, and other deficiencies. Part of these dual roadways are repaved, restriped sections of very old parts of US 93. Farther south, a direct system interchange with US 93 and I-40 is planned to eliminate the bottleneck at Beale Street in western Kingman; once this interchange is completed and all at-grade intersections of US 93 between Kingman and Hoover Dam are eliminated, I-11 will be extended south into Arizona to I-40 in Kingman. The first phase of construction began in 2024 and will finish in 2026. It will construct direct connectors from westbound I-40 to northbound US 93 and from southbound US 93 to eastbound I-40. The remaining movements between US 93 and I-40 will continue to use the existing Beale Street interchange until traffic demands warrant and the second phase can be funded.

Phase 4 of the US 93 Corridor Improvement Project will finish what was started in 1998 and connect the four sections of the divided highway to Wickenburg, allowing more traffic on these congested roads. US 93 will be cosigned as I-11 once it is built to Interstate standards.

=== Funding ===
The funding bill for the U.S. Department of Transportation, which replaced stopgaps that expired on June 30, 2012, officially designated I-11. This bill sped up funding for studying, engineering, and possibly building the highway. The Arizona State Legislature passed a law in 2009 that allowed private investors to team up with ADOT. In July 2012, Nevada's Transportation Board awarded $2.5 million (equivalent to $3.37 million in 2024) in contracts to a team of consultants to study I-11's feasibility and its environmental and economic consequences.

=== Intermountain West corridor plans ===
I-11 was previously projected to serve as an Intermountain West part of the U.S.'s long-term CANAMEX Corridor transportation plans, with potential extensions south from Casa Grande to the Sonoran border, and north from Las Vegas through northern Nevada (potentially passing through Reno or Elko) and onward through either eastern Oregon–Washington or western Idaho before terminating at the Canadian border. I-11 is projected to become the Intermountain West Corridor, extending from Phoenix and Las Vegas through Reno to the Pacific Northwest via central or eastern Oregon and central Washington to the Canada–United States border. Feasibility studies for these corridor extensions began in July 2013 and were published in November 2014.

=== Arizona extension plans ===
Officials in Pima County, Arizona, supported an extension of the planned I-11 from Casa Grande, which would wrap southwest of the Tucson Mountains before meeting with I-19 in Sahuarita, south of Tucson, and continuing east to I-10. Over 800 residents signed a petition opposing that west-side bypass because it would impact the Arizona-Sonora Desert Museum, Saguaro National Park, and Ironwood Forest National Monument. They recommended that I-11 be concurrent with existing I-10 route through Tucson. The additional segment would create the Tucson bypass route identified as a critical need by ADOT based upon I-10 traffic projections. In 2019, the draft tier 1 environmental impact statement selected the Tucson bypass route as the recommended corridor alternative, with the corridor parallel to I-10 until Casa Grande and a connection to I-10 in Marana. Although seen as beneficial to some people, the plan to build I-11 in Arizona as a whole is still receiving pushback and conservation groups are currently suing the FHWA over the construction of the route.

=== Northern Nevada extension plans ===
The proposal to extend I-11 to the Reno area was supported by both of Nevada's U.S. Senators, Harry Reid and Dean Heller, as well as the rest of Nevada's delegation to the U.S. Congress. Heller stated that connecting the Phoenix area with Las Vegas and Northern Nevada would "spur long-term economic development, create jobs and bolster international trade". As originally proposed in the 2012 Moving Ahead for Progress in the 21st Century Act, the highway would run only from Casa Grande, Arizona, to Las Vegas. This was to provide a Las Vegas–Phoenix freeway link. Extensions of the corridor to the north toward Reno and to the south toward Nogales, however, have since been approved by the 2015 Fixing America's Surface Transportation Act (FAST Act) but not to extensions north of I-80.

The Reno City Council was informed of potential I-11 corridor plans on March 15, 2018.

North of its current terminus, I-11 is expected to follow and become co-signed with US 95 from Las Vegas to Schurz or Fallon pending upgrades to Interstate standards.

North of Tonopah, the route is undecided, with various different proposed routings through Northern Nevada. These include a route through Yerington that roughly parallels SR 208 until just before the Topaz Lake area, then takes a new route into Gardnerville and Minden before meeting up with current I-580 in Carson City, which it follows to its terminus of I-80 in Reno. The other potential corridors stick closer to US 95, with one following US 95 Alternate (US 95 Alt.) through Silver Springs to meet I-80 in Fernley, while another would take a new route east of Silver Springs to Fernley, meeting current US 50 Alt. west of Fallon, which would then go to I-80 and US 95 Alt in Fernley. Another proposed route would go east of Mina and Luning and go north through Salt Wells before meeting US 95 north of Fallon, which then meets I-80 farther north. Other minor alterations to these routes were also shown.

On July 26, 2018, NDOT selected the future northbound terminus of I-11 to I-80 and US 95 Alt. in Fernley near Reno and Sparks as there are only 2 options under consideration: US 95, US 50 and US 50 Alt. (Fernley East Connection aka Fallon option) and US 95 Alt. and US 50 Alt. (Fernley West Connection aka Yerington option) as the rest of them were removed from consideration.

== Exit list ==
Old exits on I-11 were formerly exits on I-515 and US 95 numbered according to US 95 mileposts.

County	Location	mi	km	Old exit	New exit	Destinations	Notes
Colorado River		0.000	0.000			Future I-11 south / US 93 south – Kingman, Phoenix	Southern end of US 93 concurrency; southern terminus; continuation into Arizona as US 93
Colorado River		0.000	0.000	Mike O'Callaghan–Pat Tillman Memorial Bridge			
Clark	Lake Mead NRA	2.029	3.265		2	US 93 Bus. north (Boulder City Parkway) / SR 172 east (Hoover Dam Access Road) – Boulder City, Hoover Dam	Southern terminus of US 93 Bus.; western terminus of SR 172; former US 93/US 466
Clark	Boulder City	13.590	21.871		14	US 95 south / SR 173 north – Searchlight, Boulder City	Southern end of US 95 concurrency; southern terminus of SR 173; SR 173 north was formerly part of US 95 north
Clark	Henderson	14.8	23.8		15A	Railroad Pass Casino Road	
Clark	Henderson	15.3	24.6		15B	US 93 Bus. south (Boulder City Parkway)	Southbound exit and northbound entrance; northern terminus of US 93 Bus.; former US 93/US 95 south/US 466 east
Clark	Henderson	17.238	27.742	56A	17A	Wagon Wheel Drive / Nevada State Drive	Signed as exit 17 southbound; serves Nevada State College
Clark	Henderson	17.238	27.742	56B	17B	Boulder Highway (SR 582 north)	Northbound exit and southbound entrance; southern terminus of SR 582; former US 93/US 95 north/US 466 west
Clark	Henderson	18.935	30.473	57	19	College Drive	Serves College of Southern Nevada, Henderson Campus
Clark	Henderson	20.791	33.460	59	20	Horizon Drive	Diverging diamond interchange
Clark	Henderson	22.818– 22.845	36.722– 36.765	61	23	I-215 west / SR 564 east (Lake Mead Parkway)	Eastern terminus and exit 1 on I-215; western terminus of SR 564; former SR 146; serves St. Rose Dominican Hospital – Rose de Lima Campus
Clark	Henderson	23.8	38.3		62	Auto Show Drive	
Clark	Henderson	25.1	40.4	64	64A	Sunset Road	Former SR 562
Clark	Henderson	25.7	41.4		64B	Galleria Drive	Opened on November 4, 2009; serves Henderson Hospital
Clark	Henderson	26.9	43.3		65	Russell Road	Serves Sam Boyd Stadium
Clark	Paradise	29.1	46.8		68	Tropicana Avenue (SR 593) – Harry Reid International Airport	
Clark	Paradise	30.1	48.4		69	Flamingo Road (SR 592)	
Clark	Sunrise Manor–Winchester line	31.6	50.9		70	Boulder Highway (SR 582)	Former US 93/US 95/US 466
Clark	Las Vegas–Sunrise Manor line	33.2	53.4		72	Charleston Boulevard (SR 159)	
Clark	Las Vegas	34.9	56.2		73	Eastern Avenue	Former SR 607
Clark	Las Vegas	36.3	58.4		75A	Las Vegas Boulevard – Downtown Las Vegas, Cashman Center	Signed as exit 36 northbound; former SR 604/US 91/US 93/US 95
Clark	Las Vegas	36.5	58.7		75B	Casino Center Boulevard (SR 602 south) – Downtown Las Vegas	Southbound exit only; northbound entrance is via 4th Street
Clark	Las Vegas	37.262	59.967		76	I-15 / US 93 north – Los Angeles, Salt Lake City	Northern end of US 93 concurrency; Spaghetti Bowl; signed as exits 76A (south) and 76B (north); signed as the reverse southbound; exit 42 on I-15
Clark	Las Vegas	37.262	59.967		♦	I-15 south	Southern end of HOV lane; Spaghetti Bowl; HOV access only; southbound exit and northbound entrance
Clark	Las Vegas	37.6	60.5		76C	Martin L. King Boulevard	
Clark	Las Vegas	38.4	61.8		77	US 95 Bus. north / SR 599 (Rancho Drive)	Former US 95 Alt.; serves North Las Vegas Airport, University Medical Center and Valley Hospital Medical Center
Clark	Las Vegas	39.4	63.4		78	Valley View Boulevard	Southbound exit is part of exit 79
Clark	Las Vegas	40.2	64.7		79	Decatur Boulevard	
Clark	Las Vegas	41.2	66.3		80	Jones Boulevard (SR 596)	
Clark	Las Vegas	42.4	68.2		81C	SR 613 west (Summerlin Parkway)	HOV access only; northbound exit and southbound entrance
Clark	Las Vegas	42.4	68.2		81	SR 613 west (Summerlin Parkway) / SR 595 south (Rainbow Boulevard)	Signed as exits 81A (Summerlin) and 81B (Rainbow) northbound
Clark	Las Vegas	43.7	70.3		82	Lake Mead Boulevard	Signed as exits 82A (east) and 82B (west/Rainbow Boulevard) northbound
Clark	Las Vegas	45.2	72.7		83	Cheyenne Avenue (SR 574 east)	Serves MountainView Hospital and North Las Vegas Airport
Clark	Las Vegas	46.8	75.3		85	Craig Road (SR 573 east)	
Clark	Las Vegas	47.8	76.9		90A	US 95 Bus. south / SR 599 south (Rancho Drive)	No southbound entrance; southbound exit is part of exit 91B; former US 95 south
Clark	Las Vegas	48.5	78.1		90B	Ann Road	Southbound exit is part of exit 91B
Clark	Las Vegas	49.6	79.8		91B	Centennial Center Boulevard	Southbound exit and entrance
Clark	Las Vegas	49.7	80.0		91A	Future I-215 / CC 215	Centennial Bowl; CC 215 exit 38; system interchange conversion completed on December 4, 2023
Clark	Las Vegas	49.8	80.1		91B	Buffalo Drive	Northbound exit and entrance
Clark	Las Vegas	50.9	81.9		♦	Elkhorn Road	HOV access only; northbound exit and southbound entrance; northern end of HOV lane
Clark	Las Vegas	51.5	82.9		93	Durango Drive	Serves Centennial Hills Hospital
Clark	Las Vegas	52.9	85.1		95	Skye Canyon Park Drive	Formerly Horse Drive and Fort Apache Road
Clark	Las Vegas	54.193	87.215		96	SR 157 west (Kyle Canyon Road) / Sunstone Parkway – Mount Charleston	Diverging diamond interchange; eastern terminus of SR 157
Clark	Las Vegas	54.193	87.215			Future I-11 north / US 95 north – Tonopah, Reno	Current northern end of US 95 concurrency; current northern terminus
Clark	Las Vegas Paiute Indian Reservation	57.5	92.5	99	57	Nu-Wav Kaiv Boulevard / Paiute Drive – Snow Mountain Reservation	Proposed interchange upgrade
Nye	Mercury	100.0	160.9		100	Mercury Highway – Mercury	Proposed interchange upgrade; restricted area; serves Nevada National Security Sites
1.000 mi = 1.609 km; 1.000 km = 0.621 mi: Concurrency terminus; HOV only; Incomplete access; Unopened

== See also ==
- Carson and Colorado Railway
- Las Vegas and Tonopah Railroad
- Tonopah and Goldfield Railroad
