= Spring Mountain Road =

Section-line arterial in Nevada, United States

State Route 591
- Spring Mountain Road
- Spring Mountain Road highlighted in blue; former SR 591 in red

Route information
- Length: 0.242 mi (389 m)
- Existed: 1976–2008

Major junctions
- West end: Hualapai Way at Summerlin South–Spring Valley line
- SR 595 in Spring Valley; I-15 in Paradise
- East end: Las Vegas Boulevard / Sands Avenue in Paradise

Location
- Country: United States
- State: Nevada
- County: Clark

Highway system
- Nevada State Highway System; Interstate; US; State; Pre‑1976; Scenic

Spring Mountain Road is a major east–west road in the Las Vegas Valley. It runs from Hualapai Way at its western terminus to Las Vegas Boulevard in the east. East of Las Vegas Boulevard, Spring Mountain becomes Sands Avenue, and then jogs south to join Twain Avenue. State Route 591 (SR 591) was a state highway that comprised a 0.242-mile (0.389 km) section of Spring Mountain at Interstate 15. The roadway is named after Hoot Gibson's Spring Mountain Ranch, which is located where Chinatown is currently. The Spring Mountain Ranch was also known as the D-4-C Ranch due to the number of people who took advantage of Nevada's lax divorce laws in the period before the 1950s.

The street is located in the unincorporated towns of Paradise (east of Decatur Boulevard) and Spring Valley (west of Decatur). It is the main thoroughfare of Las Vegas's Chinatown.

== State highway route ==
SR 591 began at the intersection of Spring Mountain Road and Aldebaran Avenue. From there, it proceeded east under Interstate 15 and terminated near Highland Drive. Highland Drive intersects Spring Mountain Road in the form of a ramp from southbound Highland to westbound Spring Mountain, underneath I-15.

In January 2008, SR 591 had been decommissioned. Although not maintained as a state route, Nevada DOT still maintains the former highway as a frontage road (FR CL 51).

== Major intersections ==
The entire route is in Clark County.

Location	mi	km	Destinations	Notes
Summerlin South–Spring Valley line	0.0	0.0	Hualapai Way	Western terminus
Spring Valley	1	1.6	Fort Apache Road	
Spring Valley	2	3.2	Durango Drive	
Spring Valley	3	4.8	Buffalo Drive	
Spring Valley	4	6.4	SR 595 (Rainbow Boulevard)	
Spring Valley	5	8.0	Jones Boulevard	Former SR 596
Spring Valley–Paradise line	6	9.7	Decatur Boulevard	Western end of Chinatown
Paradise	7	11	Valley View Boulevard	
Paradise	7.375	11.869	Aldebaran Avenue north	Western terminus of former SR 591; no access to Aldebaran Avenue from Spring Mountain Road eastbound
Paradise	7.5	12.1	I-15 – Los Angeles, Salt Lake City	I-15 exit 39
Paradise	7.7	12.4	Bridge over Sammy Davis Junior Drive	
Paradise	8.0	12.9	Mel Tormé Way	Eastern terminus of former SR 591
Paradise	8.21	13.21	Las Vegas Boulevard	Former US 91 / SR 604; eastern terminus of Spring Mountain Road
Paradise	8.21	13.21	Sands Avenue east	Continuation beyond eastern terminus
1.000 mi = 1.609 km; 1.000 km = 0.621 mi: Incomplete access

== Landmarks ==
- Chinatown
- Desert Breeze Park
- Fashion Show Mall
- MSG Sphere Las Vegas
- The Palazzo
- Sands Expo
- Treasure Island Hotel and Casino
- Wynn Las Vegas

== Public transport ==
RTC Transit Routes 119 & 203 function on this road.
