= Sahara Avenue =

Highway in Nevada

- Current portion of SR 589 highlighted in blue; original portions highlighted in green; remainder of Sahara Avenue highlighted in red.

Major junctions
- West end: Red Rock Ranch Road / Desert Foothills Drive in Summerlin South
- Future I-215 / CC 215 in Summerlin South; SR 595 at Las Vegas–Spring Valley line; SR 596 north at Las Vegas–Spring Valley line; I-15 in Las Vegas; SR 582 in Las Vegas; SR 612 in Sunrise Manor
- East end: Dead end 0.5 mi (0.80 km) east of Hollywood Boulevard in Sunrise Manor

Sahara Avenue is a major east-west roadway in the Las Vegas Valley. State Route 589 (SR 589) comprised a large portion of the street. The roadway is named after Sahara Las Vegas, which itself is named after the Sahara Desert. The casino is located on Las Vegas Boulevard where the boulevard intersects with Sahara Avenue.

== Route description ==
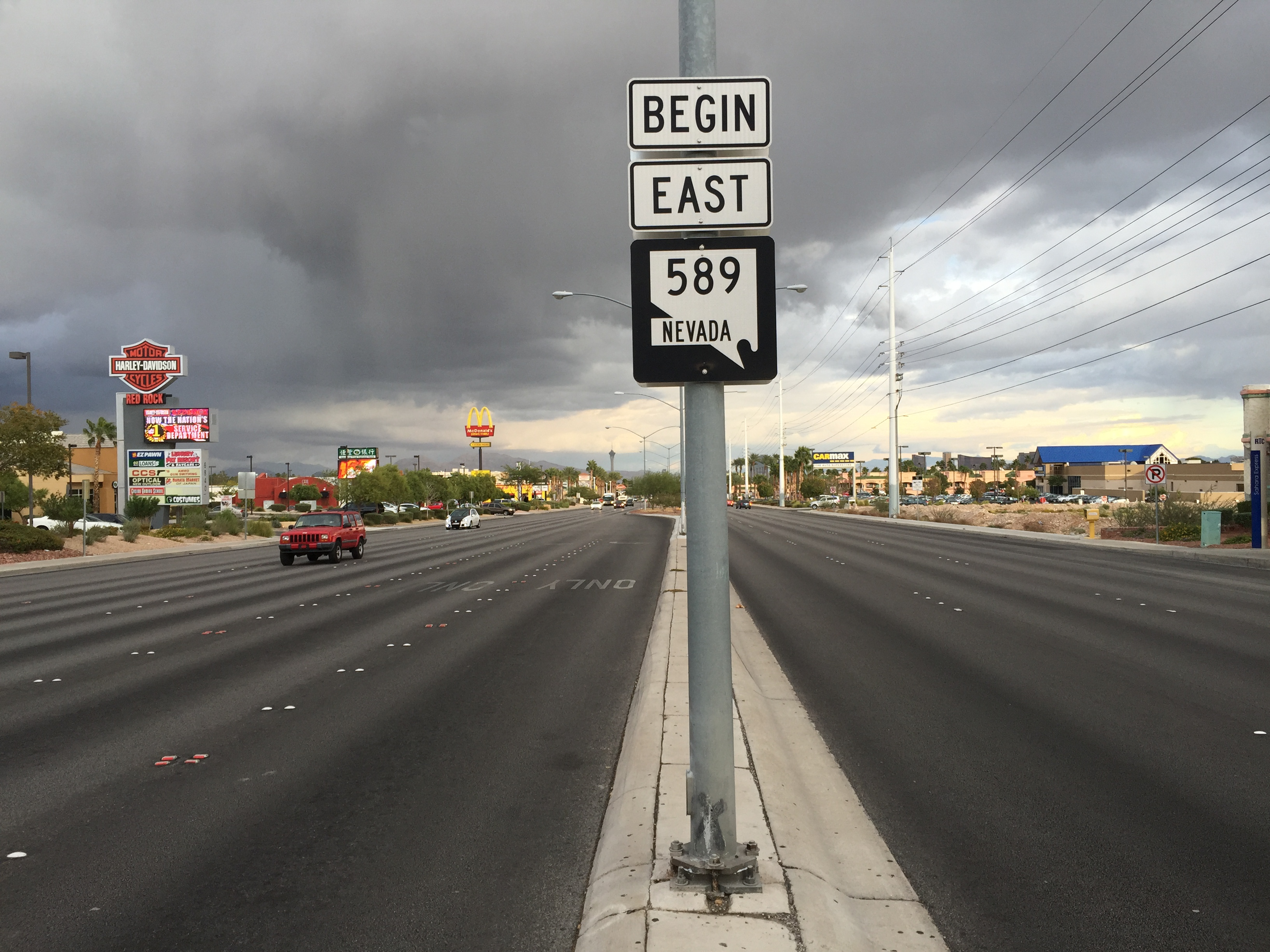
View at the west end of SR 589 looking eastbound as seen in 2015

Sahara Avenue begins in the western valley at Red Rock Ranch Road as the continuation of Desert Foothills Drive west of the Las Vegas Beltway. SR 589 began in the western Las Vegas Valley at its intersection with Rainbow Boulevard (SR 595). From there, the route continued due east to cross Interstate 15 and Las Vegas Boulevard. SR 589 proceeded further east to cross Fremont Street/Boulder Highway (SR 582), entering the unincorporated town of Sunrise Manor, passing under I-515/US 93/US 95 and terminated at Nellis Boulevard (SR 612). Sahara Avenue ends at the Hollywood Regional Park, just east of Hollywood Boulevard.

Through much of the Las Vegas area, Sahara Avenue comprises the southern boundary of the City of Las Vegas. At the intersection of Las Vegas Boulevard, Sahara Avenue marks what is typically considered the northern boundary of the Las Vegas Strip.

== History ==
The road was originally called San Francisco Avenue and served as the southern city limit for Las Vegas.

In the 1960s, city planners envisioned construction of an expressway along Sahara to Rainbow Boulevard.

The Nevada Department of Transportation (NDOT) removed SR 589 from its maintenance logs in 2019 and had begun the process of turning ownership of the roadway over to the City of Las Vegas and Clark County.

As of February 2, 2026, SR 589 still exists, running between Rancho Drive and North Bridge Lane.

== State Route 589 ==
State Route 589
- Location: Las Vegas, Nevada
- Length: 0.471 mi (758 m)
- Existed: 1976–present

A short section of Sahara Avenue is still designated SR 589. According to NDOT, it exists between Rancho Drive (former SR 599) and Northbridge Lane.

=== Major intersections ===
The entire route is in Clark County.

Location	mi	km	Destinations	Notes
Las Vegas–Spring Valley line	0.000	0.000	Sahara Avenue west	Continuation beyond former western terminus
Las Vegas–Spring Valley line	0.000	0.000	SR 595 (Rainbow Boulevard)	Former western terminus
Las Vegas–Spring Valley line			SR 596 (Jones Boulevard)	
Las Vegas–Spring Valley line			Decatur Boulevard	
Las Vegas			Valley View Boulevard	
Las Vegas			Rancho Drive	Western terminus; former SR 599 north
Las Vegas			I-15 (Las Vegas Freeway) – Los Angeles, Salt Lake City	Interchange; I-15 exit 40
Las Vegas			Highland Drive / Western Avenue	Interchange; Highland Drive only accessible from SR 589 eastbound; Western Avenue only accessible from SR 589 westbound
Las Vegas			North Bridge Lane	Interchange; no access from SR 589 eastbound; eastern terminus of SR 589; provides access to Sammy Davis Junior Drive / Industrial Road
Las Vegas			South Bridge Lane	Interchange; no access from Sahara Avenue westbound; provides access to Sammy Davis Junior Drive
Las Vegas–Winchester line			Las Vegas Boulevard	Former SR 604/US 91/US 466
Las Vegas–Sunrise Manor line			SR 582 (Boulder Highway)	Former US 93/US 95/US 466
Sunrise Manor	10.023	16.130	SR 612 (Nellis Boulevard)	Former eastern terminus
Sunrise Manor	10.023	16.130	Sahara Avenue east	Continuation beyond former eastern terminus
1.000 mi = 1.609 km; 1.000 km = 0.621 mi

== Attractions ==
- Sahara Las Vegas
- Palace Station
- Bonanza Gift Shop
- The Golden Steer Steakhouse
- The Historic Commercial Center District

== Public transport ==
Current RTC Route Sahara Avenue Express (SX) operates on this road. Bus-only lanes operate from Hualapai Way to Richfield Boulevard and from Paradise Road to Boulder Highway.
