= Nevada State Route 582 =

Highway in Nevada

State Route 582
- SR 582 highlighted in red; former segments highlighted in blue

Route information
- Maintained by NDOT
- Length: 15.392 mi (24.771 km)
- Existed: 1999–present

Major junctions
- South end: I-11 / US 93 / US 95 in Henderson
- SR 564 in Henderson; SR 593 in Whitney; SR 612 in Whitney; SR 592 in Whitney; I-11 / US 93 / US 95 in Las Vegas–Sunrise Manor line
- North end: Charleston Boulevard in Las Vegas

Location
- Country: United States
- State: Nevada
- County: Clark

Highway system
- Nevada State Highway System; Interstate; US; State; Pre‑1976; Scenic
← I-580	→ SR 589

State Route 582 (SR 582) is a major 15.392-mile-long (24.771 km) highway in the Las Vegas Valley. The highway is the former route of U.S. Route 93 (US 93) and US 95 (and, historically, US 466) before they were moved to the current freeway alignment shared with Interstate 11 (I-11) formerly Interstate 515 (I-515). Known primarily as Boulder Highway, the route connects downtown Las Vegas with Henderson and (now indirectly) Boulder City to the southeast.

== Route description ==
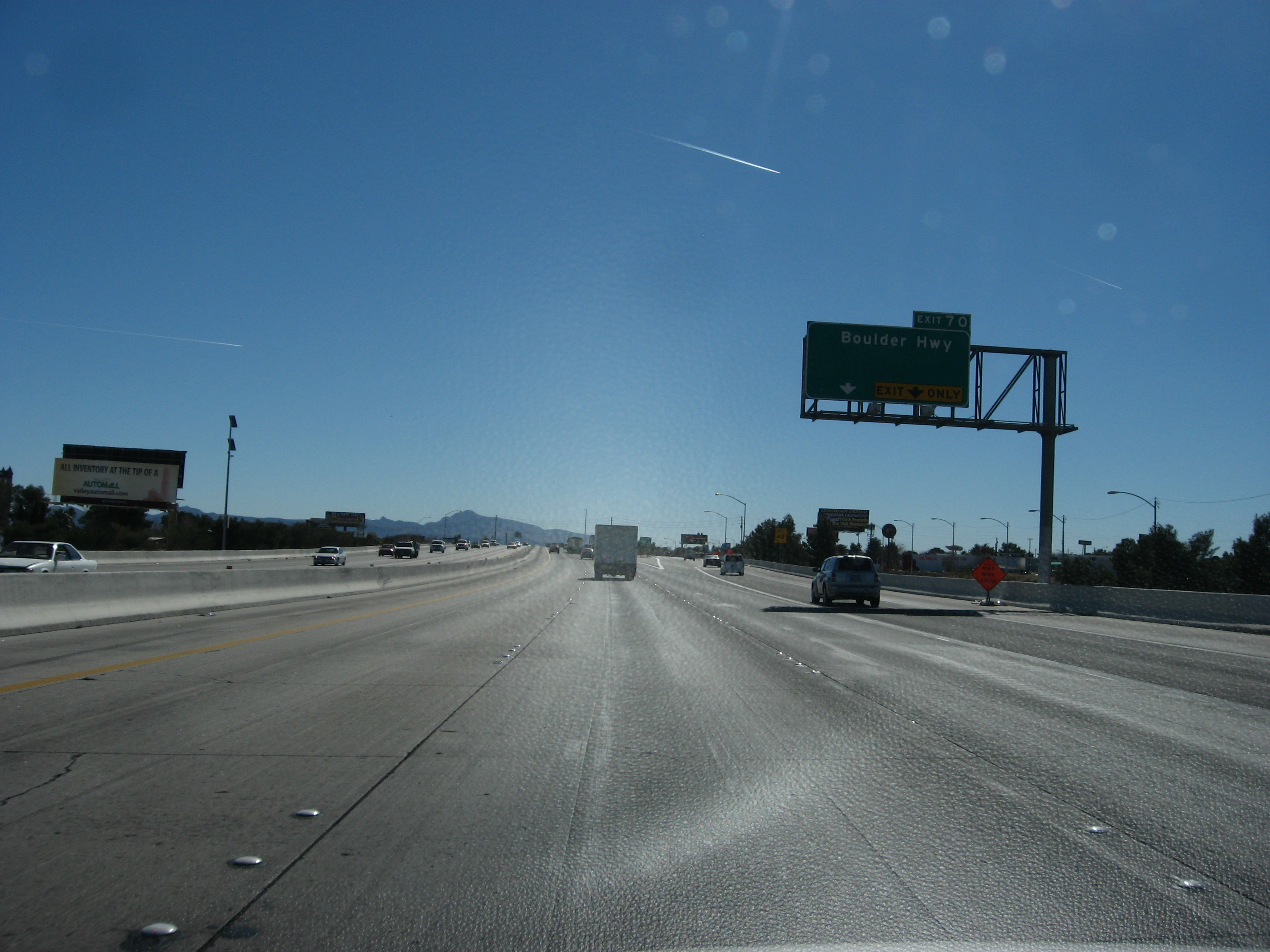
Exit 70 for Boulder Highway (SR 582) from I-515 (now I-11)/US 93/US 95 southbound as seen in 2011

Present-day SR 582 officially begins at the I-11/US 93/US 95 interchange at Wagon Wheel Drive in Henderson, although the highway itself actually starts at the intersection of Boulder Highway and Wagon Wheel Drive just east of the interchange. From its southern terminus, SR 582 quickly transitions to an urban divided highway lined with businesses as it heads northwest through Henderson.

The portion of SR 582 between Tropicana Avenue (SR 593) and the I-11/US 93/US 95 freeway is sometimes referred to as the "Boulder Strip", playing off the more-famous Las Vegas Strip to the west. This section of Boulder Highway features a landscaped median and is adjacent to several local casinos, including Boulder Station and Sam's Town Hotel and Gambling Hall.

North of the Boulder Strip area, SR 582 changes names from Boulder Highway to Fremont Street as it crosses the Las Vegas city limits at Sahara Avenue. Just south of Charleston Boulevard (SR 159), Fremont Street transitions from divided highway to a multi-lane arterial. SR 582 reaches its northern terminus at the "Five-Points" intersection with Charleston Boulevard (SR 159) and Eastern Avenue. North from here, Fremont Street continues beyond the state highway terminus, curving slightly more westward as it heads into Downtown Las Vegas.

== History ==
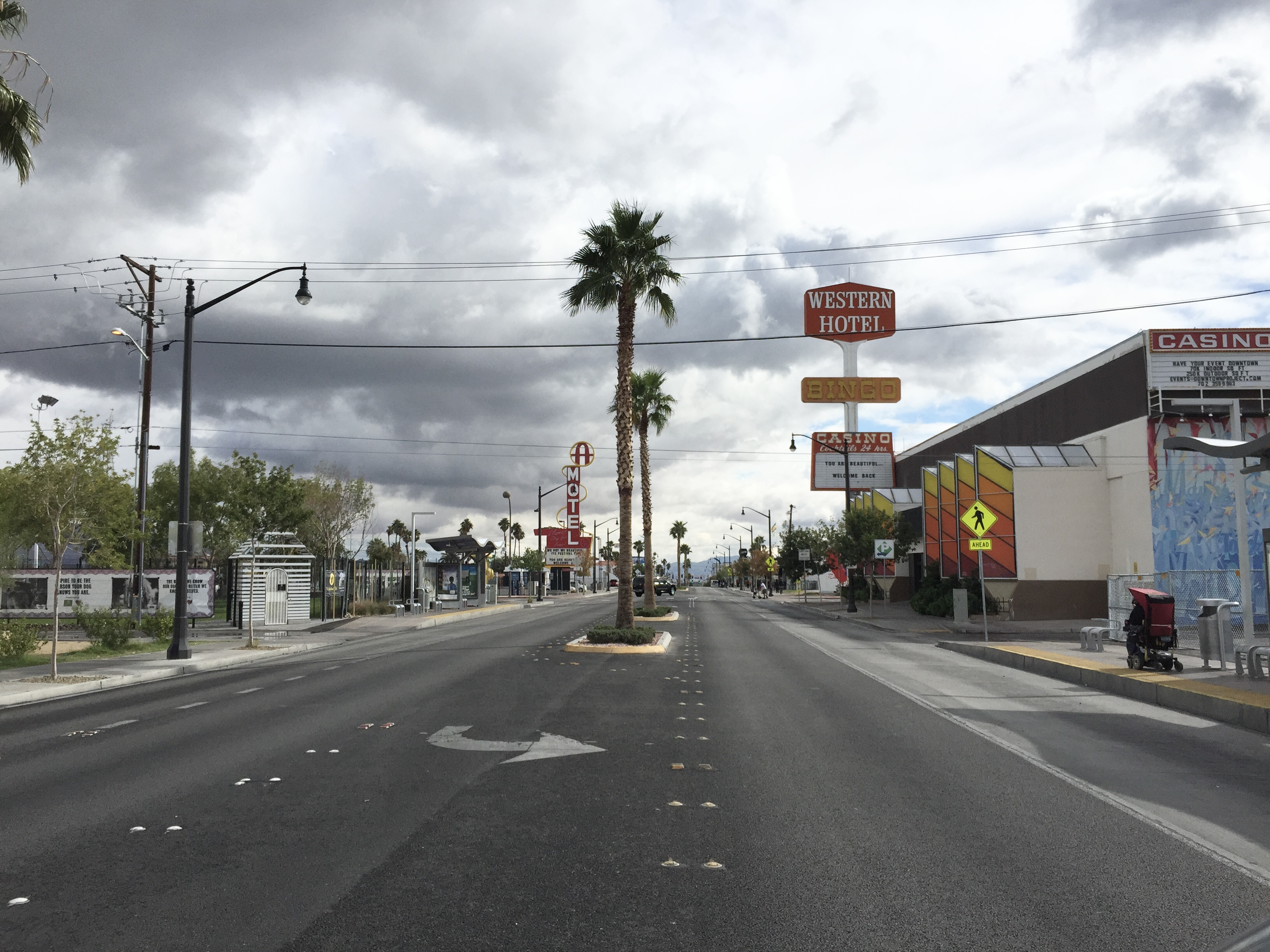
Looking southbound as seen in 2015, from the then-current north end of SR 582 at Eighth Street

Boulder Highway was constructed in 1931, and carried SR 5 from 1932 to 1939. It later carried US 93, US 95, and US 466 from near Boulder City through Henderson and into downtown Las Vegas. The US 466 designation was later removed in 1971. During the late 1980s, the Nevada Department of Transportation (NDOT) worked to extend the US 95 (Oran K. Gragson Expressway) southeast from downtown to Henderson. As portions of the freeway opened, the US 93 and US 95 designations were gradually relocated from Fremont Street and Boulder Highway, relegating the highway to state route status. In 1995, the freeway was completed to the Wagonwheel Drive interchange, and US 93 and US 95 had been completely removed from Fremont Street and Boulder Highway.

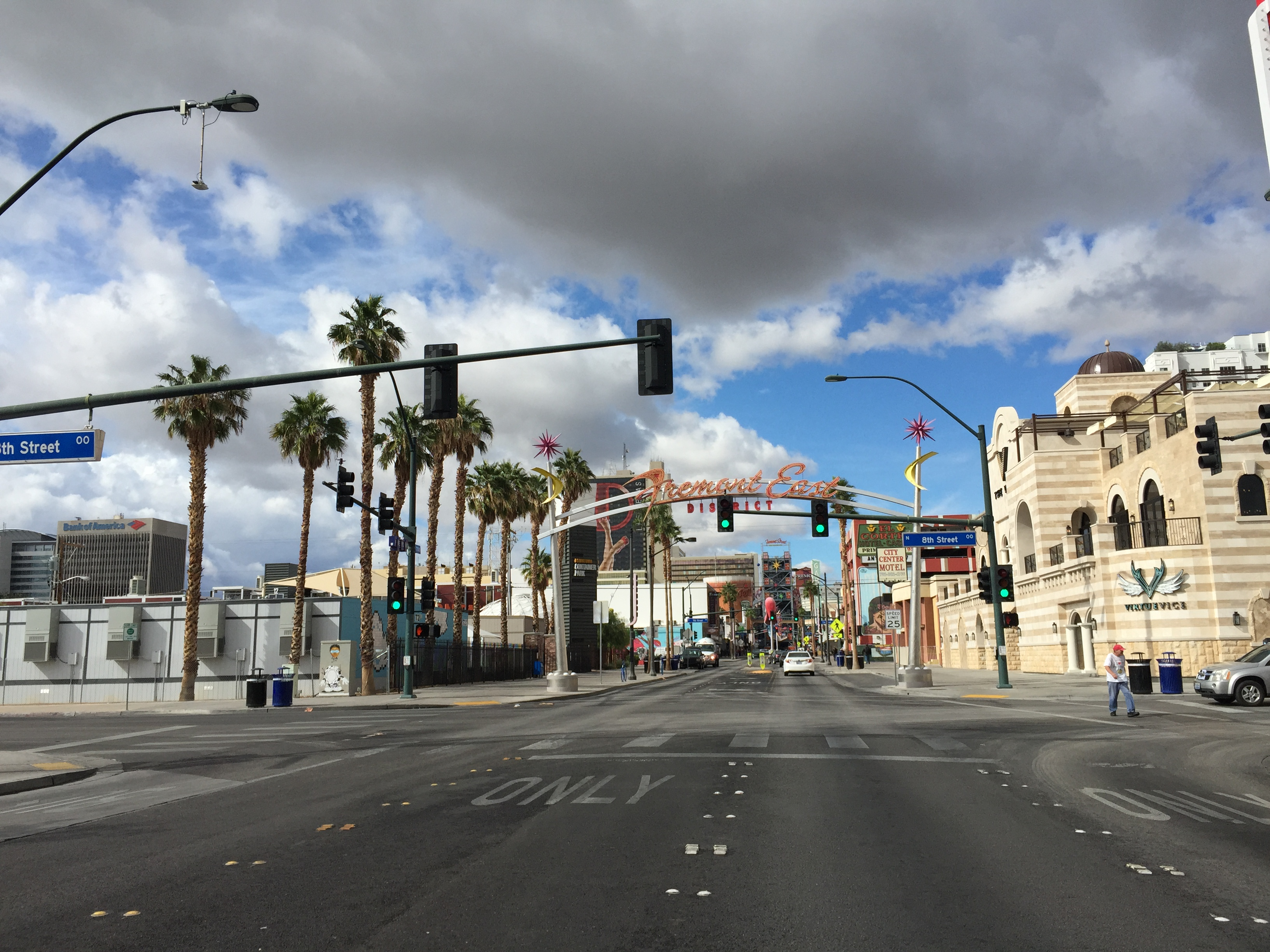
Looking northbound as seen in 2015, from the then-current northern terminus at Eighth Street; the Fremont East District is directly ahead

SR 582 first appeared on NDOT's 1999 map, likely indicating that it was created at that time. NDOT removed the portion of SR 582 between Charleston Boulevard and 8th Street from its maintenance logs by the beginning of 2019, and had begun the process of transferring ownership of that section of roadway to the City of Las Vegas. In 2023, the segment between the Wagonwheel Drive interchange and the Henderson city limits at Tulip Falls Drive was removed from the highway, leaving it in two sections.

== Major intersections ==
The entire route is in Clark County.

Location	mi	km	Destinations	Notes
Henderson	0.000	0.000	I-11 / US 93 / US 95 (Purple Heart Highway) / Wagon Wheel Drive	Interchange; southern terminus; former I-515/US 466 east; I-11 exit 17
Henderson	4.2	6.8	SR 564 (Lake Mead Parkway)	Former SR 146
Henderson	6.7	10.8	Sunset Road	Former SR 562 west
Whitney	8.5	13.7	Russell Road	Serves Sam Boyd Stadium
Whitney	9.9	15.9	SR 593 (Tropicana Avenue)	
Whitney	11.0	17.7	SR 612 (Nellis Boulevard)	
Whitney	11.2	18.0	SR 592 (Flamingo Road)	
Las Vegas–Sunrise Manor line	13.2	21.2	I-11 / US 93 / US 95 (Purple Heart Highway)	Interchange; I-11/US 95 exit 70; former I-515
Las Vegas–Sunrise Manor line	14.1	22.7	Sahara Avenue	Former SR 589 west
Las Vegas–Sunrise Manor line	15.392	24.771	SR 159 (Charleston Boulevard)	Northern terminus; former US 95 Alt. north
Las Vegas–Sunrise Manor line	15.392	24.771	Fremont Street north	Continuation beyond northern terminus; former SR 582 north/US 93 north/US 95 north/US 466 west
1.000 mi = 1.609 km; 1.000 km = 0.621 mi
