= Rainbow Boulevard (Las Vegas) =

Highway in Nevada

State Route 595
- Rainbow Boulevard
- SR 595 in blue, remainder of Rainbow Boulevard in red

Route information
- Maintained by NDOT
- Length: 5.656 mi (9.102 km)
- Existed: July 1, 1976–present

Major junctions
- South end: Starr Avenue in Enterprise
- SR 160 in Enterprise; Future I-215 / CC 215 at Enterprise–Spring Valley line; SR 595; SR 573 in Las Vegas; US 95 Bus. / SR 599 in Las Vegas
- North end: Horse Drive in Las Vegas

SR 595
- South end: Tropicana Avenue in Spring Valley
- Major intersections: SR 592 east in Spring Valley; I-11 / US 95 in Las Vegas
- North end: Washington Avenue in Las Vegas

Location
- Country: United States
- State: Nevada
- County: Clark

Highway system
- Nevada State Highway System; Interstate; US; State; Pre‑1976; Scenic
| ← SR 593 | → SR 596 |

Rainbow Boulevard is a north–south section line arterial in the Las Vegas Valley. A portion of the road is designated State Route 595 (SR 595).

== Rainbow Boulevard description ==
Rainbow Boulevard begins south of Blue Diamond Road (SR 160) in Clark County and continues north to Horse Drive in northern Las Vegas. Prior to the completion of Durango Drive north of Blue Diamond Road, Rainbow Boulevard was one of only two roads west of I-15 that connected Blue Diamond Road with the developed areas to the north. The other road was Dean Martin Drive (formerly Industrial Road). Decatur Boulevard and Fort Apache Road would soon join them in this distinction.

=== SR 595 description ===
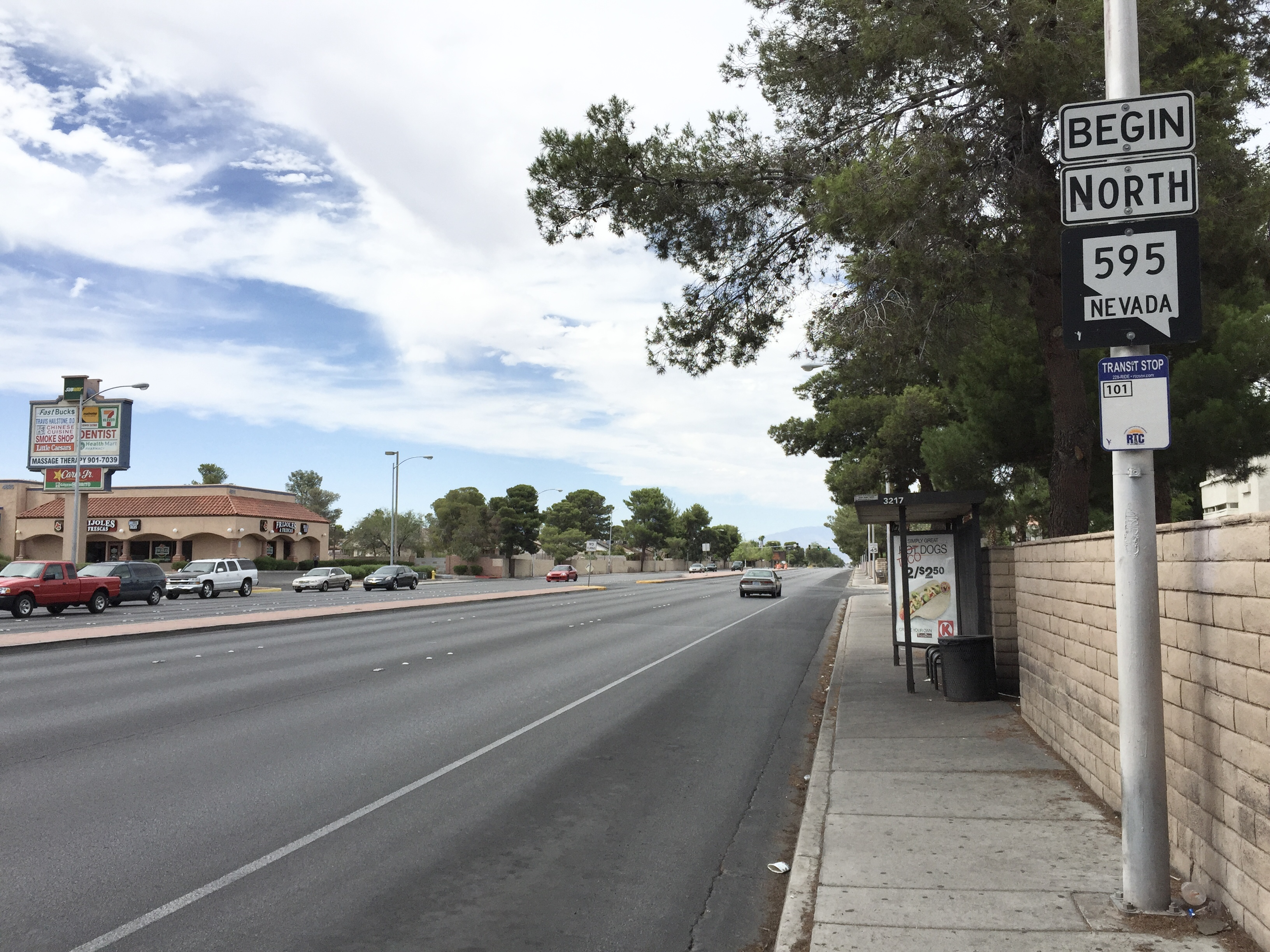
View north from the south end of SR 595 in 2015

SR 595 begins at Tropicana Avenue and proceeds north along Rainbow Boulevard for 5.495 miles (8.843 km) to Interstate 11/U.S. Route 95 (at the interchange locally known as the "Rainbow Curve"). The state-maintained portion of Rainbow Boulevard is a designated portion of the National Highway System.

== History ==
Rainbow Boulevard was originally known as Lorenzi Boulevard north of Westcliff Drive. The road got its current name sometime after US 95 was built within the area (a separate Lorenzi Street exists just east of it, from Westcliff to Charleston).

In January 2003, the southern terminus of SR 595 was at State Route 160 (Blue Diamond Road), giving the highway a total distance of 10.846 miles (17.455 km).

In January 2006, the highway had been truncated to its current terminus at Tropicana Avenue.

== Major intersections ==
The entire route is in Clark County.

| Location | mi | km | Destinations | Notes |
|---|---|---|---|---|
| Spring Valley | 0.000 | 0.000 | Rainbow Boulevard south | Continuation beyond southern terminus; former SR 595 south |
| Spring Valley | 0.000 | 0.000 | Tropicana Avenue | Southern terminus; former SR 593 east |
| Spring Valley | | | Flamingo Road (SR 592 east) | |
| Las Vegas–Spring Valley line | | | Sahara Avenue | Former SR 589 east |
| Las Vegas | | | Charleston Boulevard | Former SR 159 |
| Las Vegas | 5.495 | 8.843 | I-11 / US 95 (Purple Heart Highway) | Interchange; northern terminus; I-11/US 95 north exit 81B and south exit 81; SR 613 east exit 6A; ramps from I-11 south include direct exit and entrance from SR 613 |
| Las Vegas | 5.495 | 8.843 | Rainbow Boulevard north | Continuation beyond northern terminus; formerly Lorenzi Boulevard |
1.000 mi = 1.609 km; 1.000 km = 0.621 mi

== Public transport ==
RTC Transit Routes 101: Rainbow and 219: Craig (continuations of each other north and west respectively) function on this road.
