= U.S. Route 95 Alternate (Las Vegas) =

Former highway in Nevada

U.S. Route 95 Alternate
- Charleston Boulevard & Rancho Road
- US 95 Alternate highlighted in red

Route information
- Length: 4.40 mi (7.08 km)
- Existed: by 1953–by 1989

Major junctions
- South end: US 93 / US 95 / US 466 in Las Vegas
- US 91 / US 466 in Las Vegas
- North end: US 95 in Las Vegas

Location
- Country: United States
- State: Nevada
- County: Clark

Highway system
- United States Numbered Highway System; List; Special; Divided; Nevada State Highway System; Interstate; US; State; Pre‑1976; Scenic

U.S. Route 95 Alternate (Alternate US 95, US 95A) was an alternate route of U.S. Route 95 in Las Vegas, Nevada that provided a bypass of the downtown area. The route was also designated as State Route 5C (SR 5C), a branch of State Route 5.

== Route description ==
US 95A and SR 5C began at the intersection of Charleston Boulevard and Fremont Street (then US 93, US 95, US 466 and SR 5; now SR 582) in Las Vegas. From there, the highway proceeded along Charleston Boulevard, crossing US 91 and US 466, to a junction approximately 2.87 miles (4.62 km) to the west. At this point, Charleston Boulevard continued west along then-SR 85 while Alternate US 95 curved northward to follow Rancho Road (now Rancho Drive) to a terminus at Bonanza Road (then US 95 and SR 5; now SR 579).

== History ==
It is unclear when State Route 5C and Alternate US 95 were first designated. A 1952 map of downtown Las Vegas (depicting road layouts as of late-1950) shows the highway alignment with the state route number and without the US highway designation. Another map, produced by a Las Vegas realty company in 1955, depicts Alternate US 95 on this alignment, but no state highways. In the Las Vegas area inset of Nevada's official 1953 state map (the first version of the map to have city insets), US 95A and SR 5C are shown prominently, but without any highway labels. State highway maps would frequently display the route as a major thoroughfare up through the 1987–88 version. With the 1976 renumbering of Nevada's state routes and US 95 freeway construction throughout the 1970s and 1980s, the State Route 5C and Alternate US 95 designations were likely eliminated prior to this time.
