= Desert Breeze Park =

Park in Spring Valley, Nevada, US

Coordinates: 36.1241°N 115.27517°W

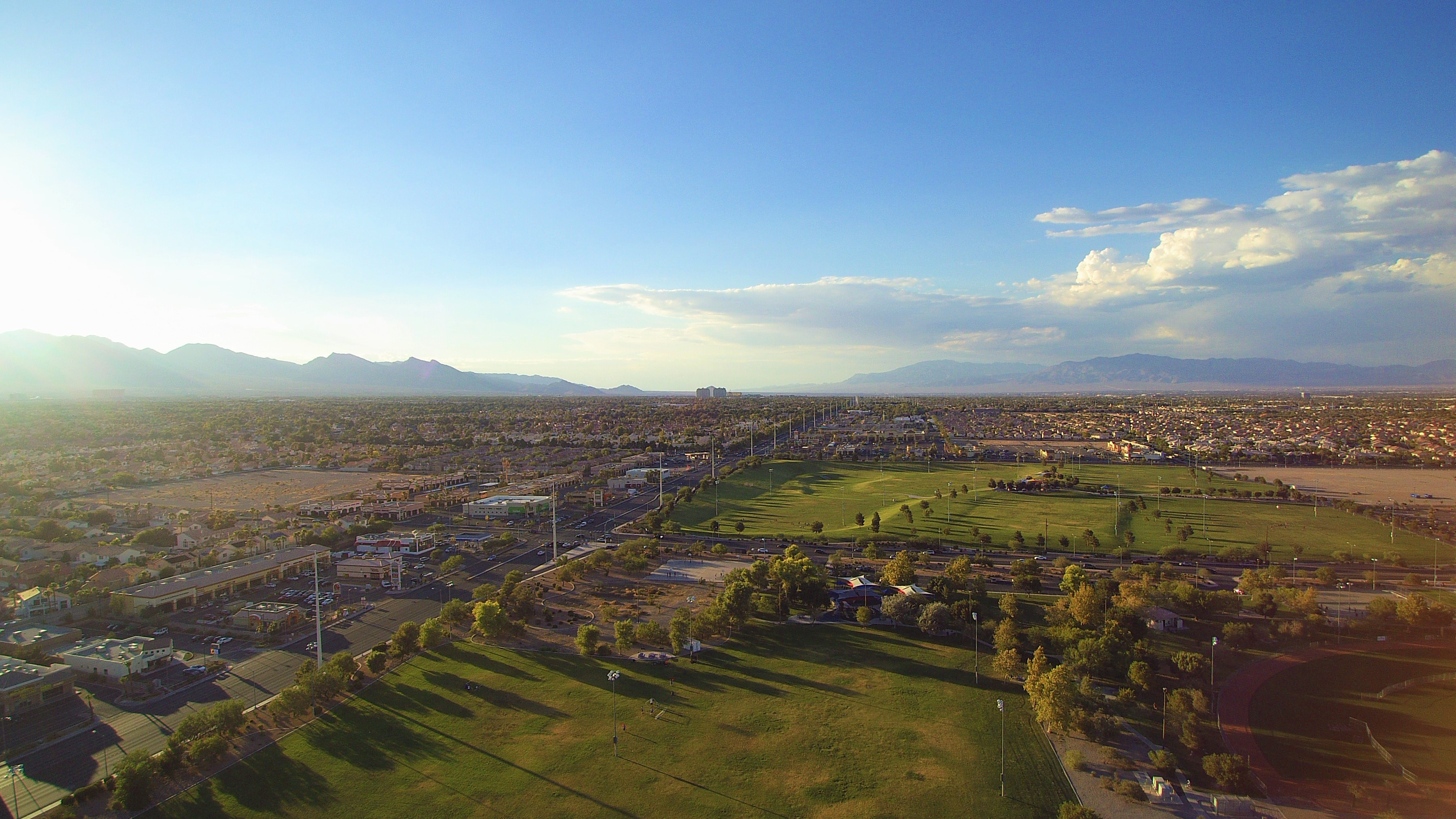
Desert Breeze Park

Desert Breeze Park located in Spring Valley, Nevada, is one of the largest parks in the Clark County park system. The regional park is a 240-acre (97 ha) facility that is not fully developed.

== Community Center ==
The community center offers meeting space, a pool and a water play area.

== Other facilities ==
- Baseball diamonds
- Basketball courts
- Children's play area
- Dog Park
- Picnic areas
- The Skate Park
- Soccer fields

== Special events ==
Dessert Breeze is the host for many events, including Bite of Las Vegas.

== Transportation ==
The park is served by the 202 and 203 RTC bus routes.
