= Spring Valley, Nevada =

Unincorporated town in the State of Nevada, United States

- Unincorporated town
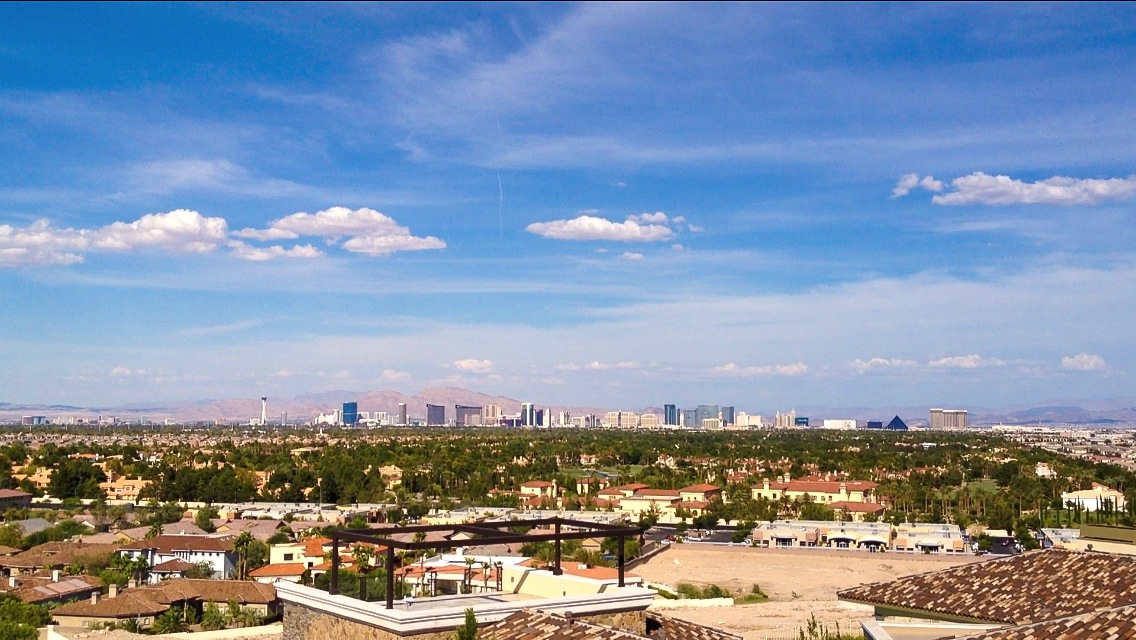
- Spring Valley, as seen from the Spanish Hills community, 2016. The Las Vegas Strip is in the background.

- Location of Spring Valley in Clark County, Nevada

- Location in the United States
- Coordinates: 36°6′45″N 115°15′1″W
- Country: United States
- State: Nevada
- County: Clark
- Founded: May 1981; 45 years ago
- Founder: Clark County Commission
- Named for: Spring Mountains

Government
  - Type: Advisory Board
  - Commissioner: Michael Naft (D)

Area
  - Total: 35.51 sq mi (91.96 km^{2})
  - Land: 35.51 sq mi (91.96 km^{2})
  - Water: 0 sq mi (0.00 km^{2})
- Elevation: 2,365 ft (721 m)

Population (2020)
  - Total: 215,597
  - Density: 6,072.3/sq mi (2,344.51/km^{2})
- Time zone: UTC-8 (PST)
  - Summer (DST): UTC-7 (PDT)
- Area codes: 702 and 725
- FIPS code: 32-68585
- GNIS feature ID: 1867350
- Website: sites.google.com/view/springvalley

Spring Valley is an unincorporated town and census-designated place in Clark County, Nevada, United States, located 2 miles (3 km) west of the Las Vegas Strip. The population was 215,597 at the 2020 census. Spring Valley was formed in May 1981.

== History ==
In 1965, the Stardust International Raceway was built by the Stardust Resort and Casino. In 1969, the Stardust was sold to the Parvin-Dohrmann Corporation, which had little interest in the raceway and then leased it until 1970, when Pardee Homes purchased the land. They began developing a master-planned housing community called Spring Valley. The community was named by Doug Pardee and sales manager Jack Whiteman, in reference to its views of the Spring Mountains and its location in the Las Vegas Valley. In 1981, residents grouped together to solicit the Clark County Commission to create an unincorporated town, which it did that May. The residents wanted to create the town due to hypothetical annexations into other communities in the Las Vegas Valley, and because they claimed they did not pay their taxes fairly for county services. The town originally encompassed 1 square mile (3 km^{2}), but now occupies much of the southwest quarter of the Las Vegas Valley, totaling 33.4 square miles (90 km^{2}).

== Geography ==
According to the United States Census Bureau, the census-designated place (CDP) of Spring Valley (which may not exactly coincide with the town boundaries) has a total area of 33.4 sq mi (87 km^{2}), all of it land.

The predominant boundaries of Spring Valley are Sahara Avenue on the north, Decatur Boulevard on the east, Warm Springs Road on the south, and Hualapai Way on the west.

The area mostly consists of housing subdivisions, with strip malls lining the large boulevards that connect suburban Las Vegas to the Strip. The northern part of Spring Valley includes areas of rural-estate zoning, with large parcels of land on blocks of 1/64 square mile (40,000 m^{2}). The southern part of Spring Valley is quickly developing – fifteen years ago, very little south of W Hacienda Ave was developed within Spring Valley.

A large park, Desert Breeze Park, is located in the north-central part of the town. Next to the park is Roger M. Bryan Elementary School.

== Demographics ==
Historical population
Census	Pop.	Note	%±
1990	51,726		—
2000	117,390		126.9%
2010	178,395		52.0%
2020	215,597		20.9%

Spring Valley CDP, Nevada – Racial composition Note: the US Census treats Hispanic/Latino as an ethnic category. This table excludes Latinos from the racial categories and assigns them to a separate category. Hispanics/Latinos may be of any race.
Race (NH = Non-Hispanic)	2020	2010	2000	1990
White alone (NH)	37.1% (80,031)	48.1% (85,768)	65.4% (76,766)	84.7% (43,819)
Black alone (NH)	12.3% (26,517)	9.4% (16,767)	5.1% (6,011)	3% (1,555)
American Indian alone (NH)	0.3% (599)	0.4% (676)	0.5% (537)	0.4% (213)
Asian alone (NH)	21.1% (45,433)	17.1% (30,527)	11.1% (13,042)	4.9% (2,544)
Pacific Islander alone (NH)	0.9% (1,960)	0.8% (1,368)	0.5% (540)	
Other race alone (NH)	0.6% (1,199)	0.2% (424)	0.2% (218)	0.1% (31)
Multiracial (NH)	5.8% (12,422)	3.5% (6,174)	3.5% (4,111)	—
Hispanic/Latino (any race)	22% (47,436)	20.6% (36,691)	13.8% (16,165)	6.9% (3,564)

At the census of 2010, there were 178,395 people living in the CDP. The racial makeup was 57.9% White, 9.8% African American, 0.6% Native American, 17.4% Asian, 0.8% Pacific Islander, and 5.0% from two or more races. Hispanic or Latino of any race were 20.6% of the population and 48.1% of the population was non-Hispanic White.

As of the census of 2000, there were 117,390 people, 47,964 households, and 29,929 families living in the CDP. The population density was 3,519.4/sq mi (1,358.8/km^{2}). There were 52,870 housing units at an average density of 1,585/sq mi (612/km^{2}). The racial makeup of the CDP was 72.60% White, 5.29% African American, 0.60% Native American, 11.21% Asian, 0.48% Pacific Islander, 5.14% from other races, and 4.67% from two or more races. Hispanic or Latino of any race were 13.77% of the population.

There were 47,964 households, out of which 27.0% had children under the age of 18 living with them, 46.7% were married couples living together, 10.5% had a female householder with no husband present, and 37.6% were non-families. 25.9% of all households were made up of individuals, and 5.9% had someone living alone who was 65 years of age or older. The average household size was 2.44 and the average family size was 2.98.

In the CDP, the population was spread out, with 21.2% under the age of 18, 9.4% from 18 to 24, 33.7% from 25 to 44, 25.0% from 45 to 64, and 10.7% who were 65 years of age or older. The median age was 36 years. For every 100 females, there were 99.6 males. For every 100 females age 18 and over, there were 98.4 males.

The median income for a household in the CDP was $48,563, and the median income for a family was $55,021. Males had a median income of $37,068 versus $28,288 for females. The per capita income for the CDP was $26,321. About 4.8% of families and 6.7% of the population were below the poverty line, including 6.9% of those under age 18 and 7.7% of those age 65 or over.

== Culture ==
=== Chinatown ===
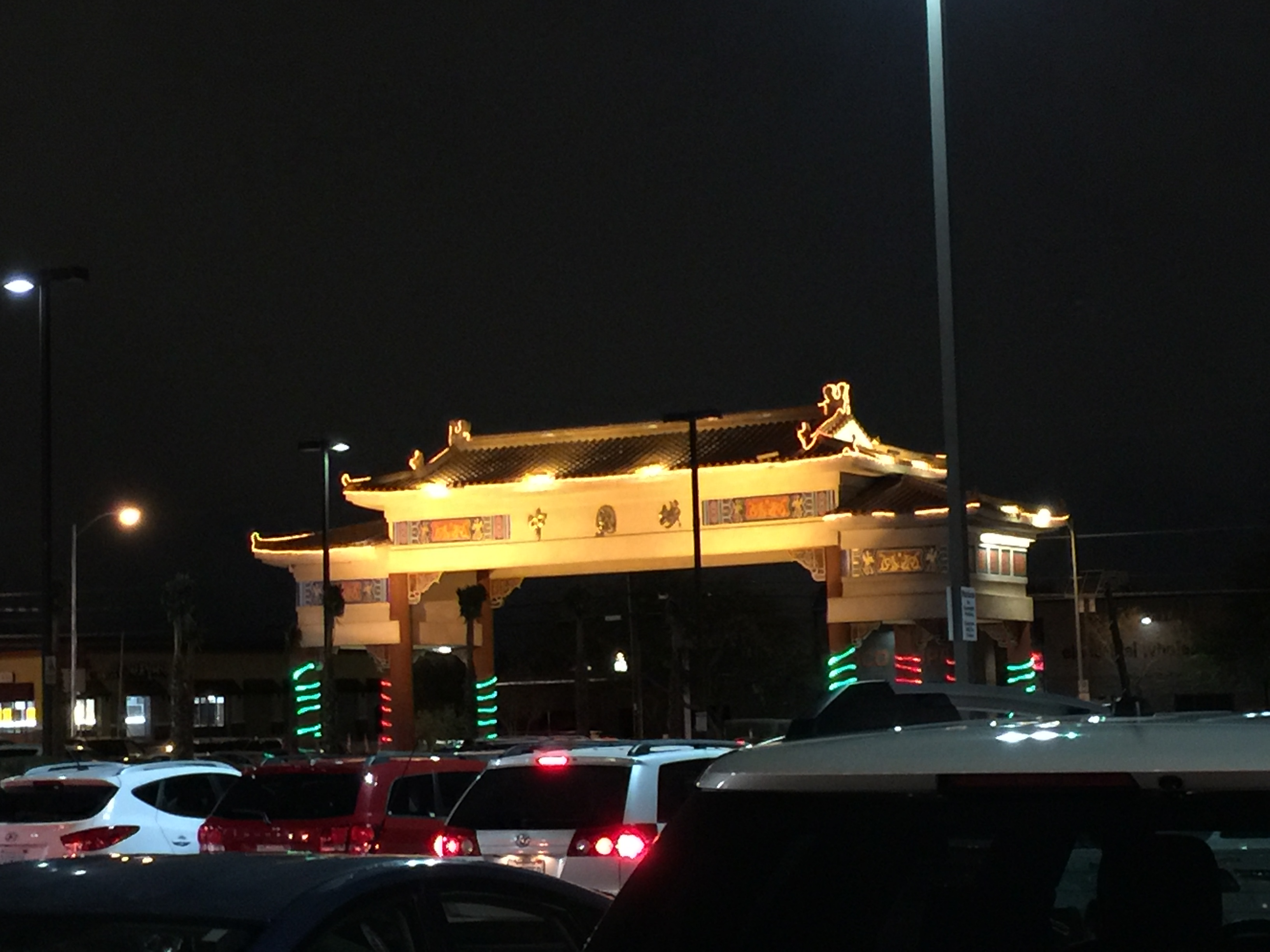
Las Vegas Chinatown Plaza paifang

The strip malls along Spring Mountain Road and surrounding streets, from Valley View to Jones Boulevard in Spring Valley into Paradise, house many ethnic Chinese and other pan-Asian businesses, with the original called Chinatown Plaza. The district is primarily a retail destination, rather than a residential enclave, catering to Asian Americans.

The Chinatown Plaza strip mall was conceived by Taiwanese American James Chih-Cheng Chen and opened in February 1995 at the corner of Spring Mountain and Wynn; it has 85,000 ft (26,000 m) of space and was designed by Simon Lee in a style inspired by Tang dynasty buildings. Chen called it "America's first master-planned Chinatown". The plaza was funded by JHK Investment Group, Inc., which Chen had formed with two high school classmates: Henry Chen-Jen Hwang and K.C. Chen (no relation). James Chen, an emigrant from Taiwan who arrived in Los Angeles in 1971 with $30, saw a demand for Asian food and restaurants: "I see so many Asian tourists here [in Las Vegas], but I see no Asian business people. They're happy with everything in Las Vegas except the food." Sharon Hwang, Henry's daughter, recalled her father was similarly inspired by stories he would hear from tourists returning from Las Vegas to Los Angeles: "... We figured all the Southern California Chinese, they love to come to Vegas, gambling; that was the thing. So they would come average, I would say, once or twice a year at least. But everybody's thing was, there's no Chinese food; there's no good Chinese food in Las Vegas, nothing authentic, just nothing really. It was kind of a joke almost in California." By 1996, the plaza was visited by approximately 3,000 to 5,000 daily, and Chen was planning to open the Far East Trade Center later that year for manufacturers to exhibit their goods.

Clark County designated Chinatown Plaza as the Asian Pacific American Cultural Center on May 7, 1996, the first official recognition of the new district. Nevada Governor Kenny Guinn officially designated the 3 mi long (4.8 km) district along Spring Mountain from Las Vegas Boulevard to Rainbow Boulevard as Chinatown in October 1999 and it continues to grow as the Asian population in Las Vegas expands rapidly. The Chinatown area has gained much popularity, receiving national attention in a 2004 article by The Wall Street Journal. Huffington Post classifies the Chinatowns in Las Vegas, Atlanta-Chamblee, Dallas-Richardson, and North Miami Beach as "modern" styled Chinatown, in contrast with the historic core Chinatowns in New York and San Francisco. The Las Vegas Chinatown is pan-Asian in nature instead of being completely Chinese according to the previous source. The official website for the Chinatown Plaza indicates that Spring Mountain Road is the general corridor for the neighborhood.

The history of Chinese population in the Las Vegas Valley shows that the Chinese population remained small throughout most of its history. As a result, a Chinatown could only be created with initiative from entrepreneurs that would in essence fabricate a scenario that came naturally in other large cities that have historically important Chinatowns. According to Bonnie Tsui, Las Vegas's Chinese population boomed starting from the 1960s and by the 1990s, the Chinese population grew to 15,000 with the majority working in the casino industry. Even as the population grew, the "Chinatown experiment" could not rely on the local Chinese population to create it, but relied on a label on the plaza itself before people knew it was "Chinatown". In addition, Senator Harry Reid "... ordered a sign to be put up for Chinatown [along Interstate 15]..." but was taken down by the order of the governor of Nevada Bob Miller.

== Education ==
All public schools within Spring Valley are part of the Clark County School District.

Elementary schools

- Roger M. Bryan Elementary School
- Patricia A. Bendorf Elementary School
- C.H. Decker Elementary School
- Harvey Dondero Elementary School
- Marion Earl Elementary School
- Wayne Tanaka Elementary School
- Pat Diskin Elementary School
- Helen Jydstrup Elementary School

Middle schools

- Wilbur & Theresa Faiss Middle School
- Victoria Fertitta Middle School
- Kenny Guinn Middle School
- Clifford J. Lawrence Middle School
- Grant Sawyer Middle School
- Lawrence & Heidi Canarelli Middle School

High schools

- Durango High School
- Spring Valley High School
- Bonanza High School
- Ed W. Clark High School
- Sierra Vista High School

Spring Valley has a public library, a branch of the Las Vegas-Clark County Library District.

== See also ==
- List of census-designated places in Nevada
