= Centennial Hills, Las Vegas =

Neighborhood in Las Vegas, Nevada, U.S.

Centennial Hills
- Neighborhood
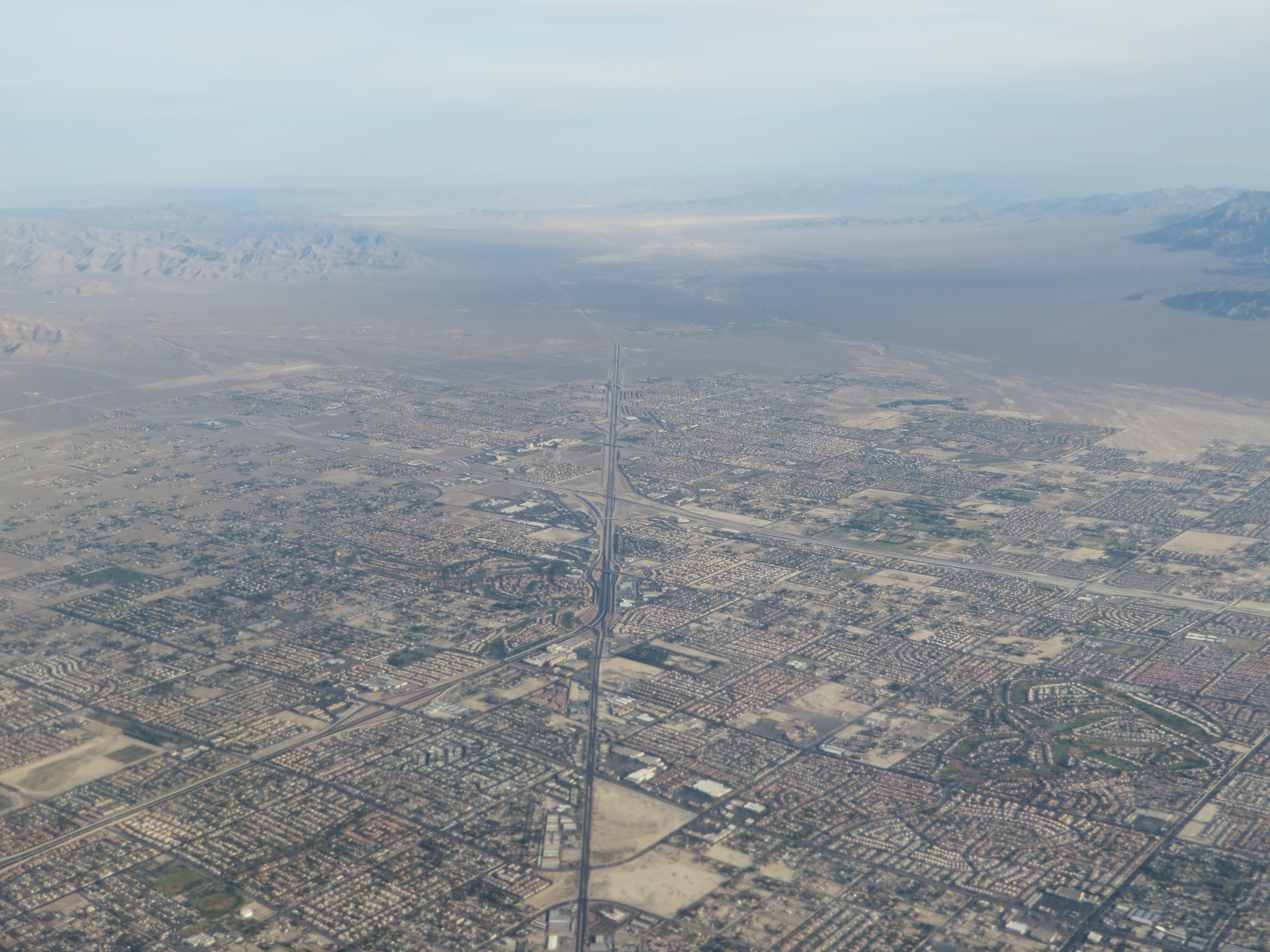
- Aerial view of Centennial Hills in 2014
- Etymology: Name chosen through contest
- Country: United States
- State: Nevada
- County: Clark County
- City: Las Vegas
- Named: January 17, 2001

Centennial Hills is a neighborhood in northwest Las Vegas, Nevada, United States. It is bordered by the Snow Mountain Paiute Reservation and Tule Springs Fossil Beds National Monument to the north, Lower Kyle Canyon and the Red Rock Canyon National Conservation Area to the west, Summerlin to the south, and North Las Vegas to the east. The Spring Mountains are visible to the west with Gass Peak in the Las Vegas Range to the north. Lone Mountain lies within the neighborhood.

== History ==
On January 17, 2001, northwest Las Vegas, which occupies over a third of the city's area, was unofficially given the name Centennial Hills in a contest, which won with 2,222 votes. Other proposed names for the area were Arrow Canyon with 1,784 votes, Tule Springs with 111 votes, and Cielo de Oro, chosen by Mayor Oscar Goodman, with 35 votes.

On January 21, 2008, the Centennial Hills Hospital opened in Centennial Hills on Durango Drive, as the first tobacco-free campus in Nevada. The campus has 226 beds an area of 354,000 sq ft (32,900 m^{2}) and includes two medical office buildings.

== Parks and recreation ==
Tule Springs Lake at Floyd Lamb Park

Located just north of Centennial Hills, Tule Springs Fossil Beds National Monument is accessible from the neighborhood at Moccasin Road and Durango Drive. Further south off Durango is Tule Springs, an urban retreat which is the location of Floyd Lamb Park, Tule Springs Ranch Historic Site, and Tule Springs Archeological Site.

Among the other parks and playgrounds in the area is the main Centennial Hills Park, which features an amphitheater and has ice age fossil-themed trails and is built around a historic inverted riverbed.

== Transportation ==
Centennial Hills is centered around the interchange of I-11/U.S. 95 and the Las Vegas Beltway (CC 215), built in 2003. In 2015, upgrades to the junction (in preparation for I-11 to pass through it) proceeded, and it was named the Centennial Bowl. Completion of the Centennial Bowl project finished in 2023.

The RTC Centennial Hills Transit Center Park & Ride began construction in June 2009 and opened January 2010.

=== Roads ===
Centennial Hills is served by the following roads:

Highways

- Interstate 11/U.S. Route 95
- Clark County Route 215 (Las Vegas Beltway)
- Nevada State Route 157 (Kyle Canyon Road)
- Nevada State Route 573 (Craig Road)
- Nevada State Route 574 (Cheyenne Avenue)
- Nevada State Route 599/U.S. Route 95 Business (Rancho Drive)

Major roads

- Ann Road
- Decatur Boulevard
- Durango Drive
- Elkhorn Road
- Jones Boulevard
- Lone Mountain Road

== Education ==
Notable high schools in Centennial Hills are the Centennial High School, Arbor View High School, and Shadow Ridge High School. Centennial Hills Library, next to Centennial Hills Park, serves the neighborhood. Centennial Hills also has a private preschool, Merryhill School, for children ages 6 weeks through Pre-K.
