= Durango Drive =

Arterial in Las Vegas, Nevada

- Durango Drive in red.

Route information
- Maintained by Clark County and City of Las Vegas
- Length: 21.85 mi (35.16 km)

Southern segment
- South end: Dead end 600 ft (200 m) south of Cactus Avenue in Enterprise
- Major intersections: SR 160 in Enterprise; Future I-215 / CC 215 in Enterprise; SR 613 in Las Vegas
- North end: Vegas Drive in Las Vegas

Northern segment
- South end: Cheyenne Avenue / Rampart Boulevard in Las Vegas
- Major intersections: Future I-215 / CC 215 in Las Vegas; I-11 / US 95 in Las Vegas
- North end: Moccasin Road at Las Vegas–Tule Springs Fossil Beds National Monument line

Location
- Country: United States
- States: Nevada
- Counties: Clark

Highway system

Durango Drive is a major north–south section line arterial road in the Las Vegas metropolitan area, Nevada, United States. It is located in the western part of the city.

== Route ==
=== Southern half ===
Durango Drive's southern terminus is at an intersection with Starr Avenue in Enterprise. From here, Durango Drive heads north and intersects with Blue Diamond Road (SR 160) followed by serving as a section line road dividing Spring Valley and Enterprise for one mile from Windmill Lane to Warm Springs Road. Entering Spring Valley, Durango Drive continues north to its first interchange with CC 215 (exit 17). Just north of this interchange is Nevada's first IKEA furniture store, opened in 2016, and the future site of the UnCommons mixed-use development by Matter Real Estate. Durango Drive continues through Spring Valley before crossing into Las Vegas. Once in Las Vegas, Durango Drive crosses Charleston Boulevard before making an S-curve to the east, like most other major north-south grid roads in the Las Vegas metropolitan area west of I-15 do. After this, Durango Drive meets Summerlin Parkway (SR 613) at an interchange before the northern terminus of Durango Drive's southern segment at Vegas Drive.

=== Northern half ===
The southern terminus of Durango Drive's northern segment is at an intersection with Cheyenne Avenue. Here, Durango Drive's roadway continues south as Rampart Boulevard into the Summerlin neighborhood. Heading north, Durango Drive meets its second interchange with CC 215 (exit 37) before another interchange, this time with I-11/US 95 (exit 51). Farther north, Durango Drive intersects Brent Lane, which provides access to Tule Springs Road and Floyd Lamb Park at Tule Springs, before reaching its northern terminus at an intersection with Moccasin Road on the border between Las Vegas and Tule Springs Fossil Beds National Monument.

== Major intersections ==
The entire route is in Clark County.

Location	mi	km	Destinations	Notes
Enterprise	0.00	0.00	Cactus Avenue	Southern terminus
Enterprise	0.50	0.80	Mountain's Edge Parkway	Access to Mountain's Edge Regional Park
Enterprise	1.55	2.49	SR 160 (Blue Diamond Road)	
Enterprise	1.95	3.14	Pebble Road	
Enterprise	2.96	4.76	Windmill Lane east	Western terminus of Windmill Lane
Enterprise	3.43	5.52	Rhodes Ranch Parkway / Robindale Road	
Enterprise	3.98	6.41	Warm Springs Road	
Spring Valley	4.69	7.55	Future I-215 east / CC 215 east / Roy Horn Way	Durango Drive accessible from CC 215 southbound via Roy Horn Way; CC 215 west exit 17
Spring Valley	4.79	7.71	Future I-215 west / CC 215 west / Rafael Rivera Way	CC 215 northbound accessible from Durango Drive via Rafael Rivera Way; CC 215 south exit 18
Spring Valley	5.05	8.13	Sunset Road	Access to and from northbound and southbound CC 215
Spring Valley	6.10	9.82	Russell Road	
Spring Valley	6.60	10.62	Hacienda Avenue	
Spring Valley	7.10	11.43	Tropicana Avenue	
Spring Valley	7.60	12.23	Peace Way	
Spring Valley	8.10	13.04	Flamingo Road	
Spring Valley	8.85	14.24	Spring Mountain Road	
Spring Valley	9.10	14.65	Desert Inn Road	
Spring Valley	10.10	16.25	Sahara Avenue	
Las Vegas	10.60	17.06	Oakey Boulevard east	Western terminus of Oakey Boulevard
Las Vegas	11.10	17.86	Charleston Boulevard	Former SR 159
Las Vegas	11.70	18.83	Alta Drive	
Las Vegas	12.20	19.63	Westcliff Drive	Durango Drive changes signing from South Durango Drive to North Durango Drive; access to RTC park and ride lot
Las Vegas	12.39– 12.53	19.94– 20.17	SR 613 east (Summerlin Parkway)	Interchange; eastbound entrance and westbound exit; SR 613 exit 4
Las Vegas	12.70	20.44	Washington Avenue east	Western terminus of Washington Avenue
Las Vegas	13.30	21.40	Vegas Drive	Northern terminus of southern segment
Las Vegas	Gap in route			
Las Vegas	13.30	21.40	Rampart Boulevard	Continuation beyond southern terminus of northern segment
Las Vegas	13.30	21.40	Cheyenne Avenue	Southern terminus of northern segment
Las Vegas	13.85	22.29	Gowan Road	
Las Vegas	14.35	23.09	Alexander Road	
Las Vegas	14.85	23.90	Craig Road	
Las Vegas	15.35	24.70	Lone Mountain Road	
Las Vegas	16.35	26.31	Ann Road	
Las Vegas	16.85	27.12	Tropical Parkway	
Las Vegas	17.02	27.39	Grand Montecito Parkway	
Las Vegas	17.63	28.37	Centennial Parkway / Centennial Center Boulevard	
Las Vegas	17.75– 17.85	28.57– 28.73	Future I-215 / CC 215	Diamond interchange; CC 215 exit 37
Las Vegas	18.13	29.18	Deer Springs Road	Access to Centennial Hills Hospital
Las Vegas	18.63	29.98	Elkhorn Road	
Las Vegas	18.85	30.34	Oso Blanca Road	Access to RTC park and ride lot
Las Vegas	19.01– 19.20	30.59– 30.90	I-11 / US 95 – Downtown Las Vegas, Tonopah, Reno	Five-ramp partial cloverleaf interchange; I-11/US 95 exit 93
Las Vegas	19.38	31.19	El Capitan Way / Farm Road	
Las Vegas	19.85	31.95	Grand Teton Drive	
Las Vegas	20.59	33.14	Brent Lane	Access road to Tule Springs Road and Floyd Lamb Park at Tule Springs
Las Vegas	21.85	35.16	Moccasin Road	Northern terminus; access to Tule Springs Fossil Beds National Monument
1.000 mi = 1.609 km; 1.000 km = 0.621 mi: Incomplete access; Route transition

== Buildings and parks along Durango Drive ==
The following locations are sorted from south to north.

=== Buildings ===
- Durango Resort
- Centennial Hills Hospital

=== Parks ===
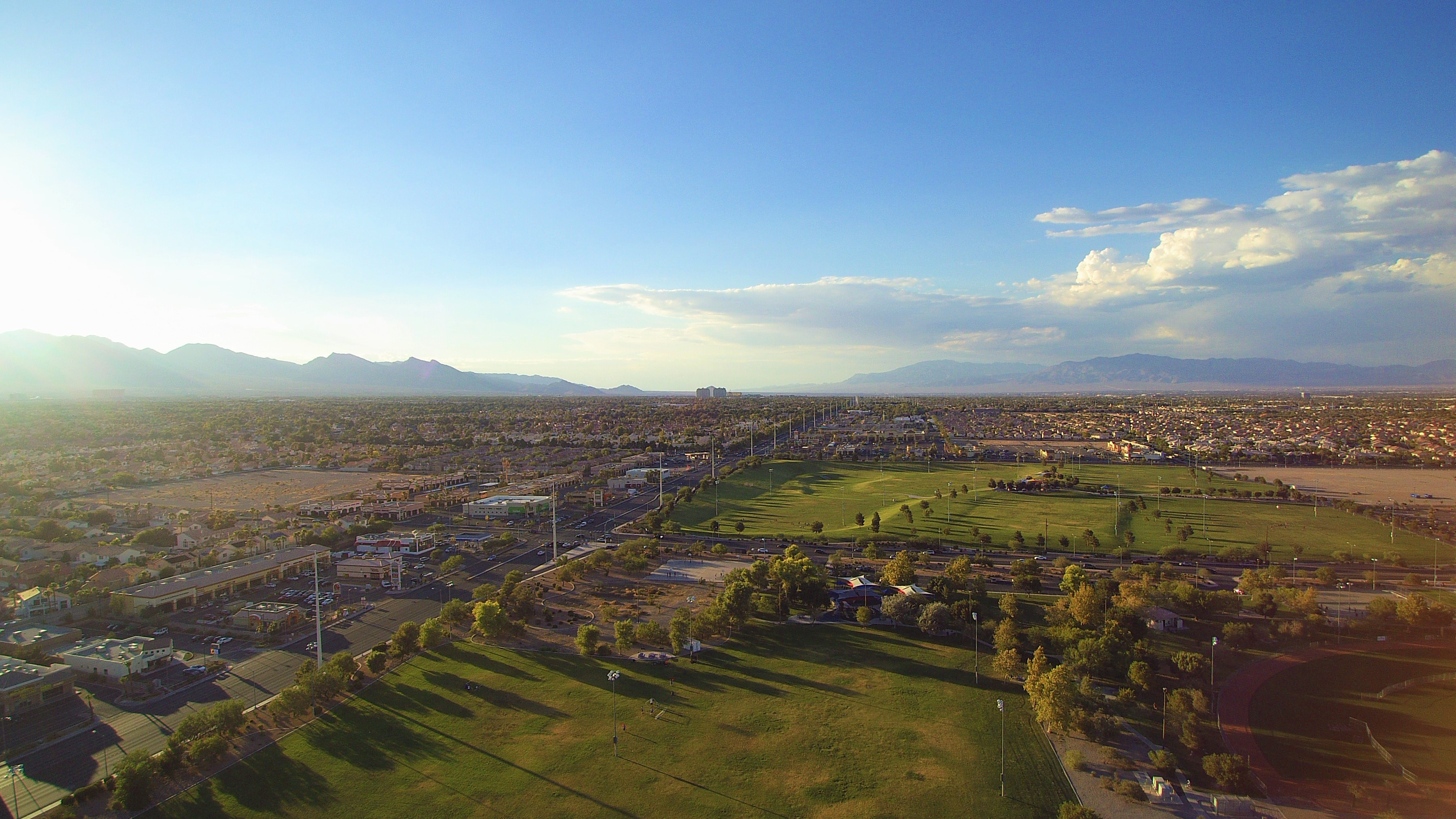
Desert Breeze Park with Durango Drive to the left

- Mountain's Edge Regional Park (nearby, along Mountain's Edge Parkway)
- Desert Breeze Park
- Angel Park
  - Angel Park Golf Club
- Las Vegas Sports Park (nearby, along Rampart Boulevard)
- Durango Hills Park
  - Durango Hills Golf Club
- Mountain Crest Park
- Raptor Play Park
- Viper Lacrosse Fields
- Tule Springs
  - Tule Springs Ranch
  - Floyd Lamb Park at Tule Springs
- Tule Springs Fossil Beds National Monument (nearby, accessible from Moccasin Road)
