= Elkhorn Road =

Major west-east road in the Las Vegas metropolitan area

- Maintained by: Clark County, City of Las Vegas and City of North Las Vegas
- Length: 8.37 mi (13.47 km)
- Location: Las Vegas and North Las Vegas; Clark County
- West end: Egan Crest Drive in Las Vegas
- Major junctions: I-11 / US 95 in Las Vegas
- East end: Tule Springs Parkway in North Las Vegas (future extension to Clayton Street)

Elkhorn Road is a minor west–east arterial road in the Las Vegas metropolitan area, Nevada, United States.

== Route ==
Elkhorn Road begins at Egan Crest Drive in the northwestern corner of Las Vegas. The road heads east to the Centennial Hills neighborhood where it forms a major intersection with Durango Drive near the RTC park and ride lot. Elkhorn Road eventually has an interchange with I-11/U.S. 95 via an HOV ramp completed in 2019. It serves as an entrance to I-11/U.S. 95 southbound and an exit from I-11/U.S. 95 northbound. The road continues eastward through residential areas and past farms and ranches before entering the North Las Vegas city limits at Decatur Boulevard. The road runs through North Las Vegas; for 2 miles (3.2 kilometers), Elkhorn Road passes through the Aliante community and the Aliante Casino and Hotel before ending Tule Springs Parkway. From the dead end, Elkhorn Road will be extended to the soon-to-be extended Clayton Street. (Note: Clayton Street ends at Dorrell Lane, just south of the Las Vegas Beltway (CC 215); due to the way Clayton Street and Elkhorn Road are configured, it is impossible for Elkhorn Road to end at Clayton Street.)

A disconnected segment of Elkhorn Road also exists between Elaine Street and Commerce Street, serving as a residential street for the area.

== Major intersections ==
The entire route is in Clark County.

Location	mi	km	Destinations	Notes
Las Vegas	0.00	0.00	Egan Crest Drive	Western terminus of Elkhorn Road
Las Vegas	0.25	0.40	Hualapai Way	
Las Vegas	0.75	1.21	Grand Canyon Drive	
Las Vegas	1.25	2.01	Fort Apache Road	
Las Vegas	1.75	2.82	Durango Drive	
Las Vegas	1.96	3.15	Grand Montecito Parkway	Access to RTC park and ride lot Access to Mountain Ridge Park
Las Vegas	2.21	3.56	I-11 south / US 95 south	Interchange; HOV access only; southbound entrance and northbound exit
Las Vegas	2.79	4.49	Cimarron Road	
Las Vegas	3.30	5.31	Buffalo Drive	
Las Vegas	3.80	6.12	Tenaya Way	
Las Vegas	4.30	6.92	Rainbow Boulevard	
Las Vegas	5.30	8.53	Jones Boulevard	
Las Vegas	5.80	9.33	Bradley Road	
North Las Vegas	6.30	10.14	Decatur Boulevard	
North Las Vegas	6.80	10.94	Aviary Way	
North Las Vegas	7.60	12.23	Aliante Parkway	Access to Aliante Casino and Hotel
North Las Vegas	8.37	13.47	Dead end	Eastern terminus of Elkhorn Road; Future extension to Clayton Street
1.000 mi = 1.609 km; 1.000 km = 0.621 mi: HOV only

== Places along Elkhorn Road ==
The following lists are in order of west-east location along Elkhorn Road.

=== Buildings ===
- Aliante Casino and Hotel

=== Parks ===
- Promenade Park (at western terminus of Elkhorn Road)
- Winding Trails Park
- Mountain Ridge Park (access via Grand Montecito Parkway)
- Centennial Hills Park (access via Buffalo Drive)
- Aliante Golf Club
