= White poppy =

Flower used as a symbol of peace

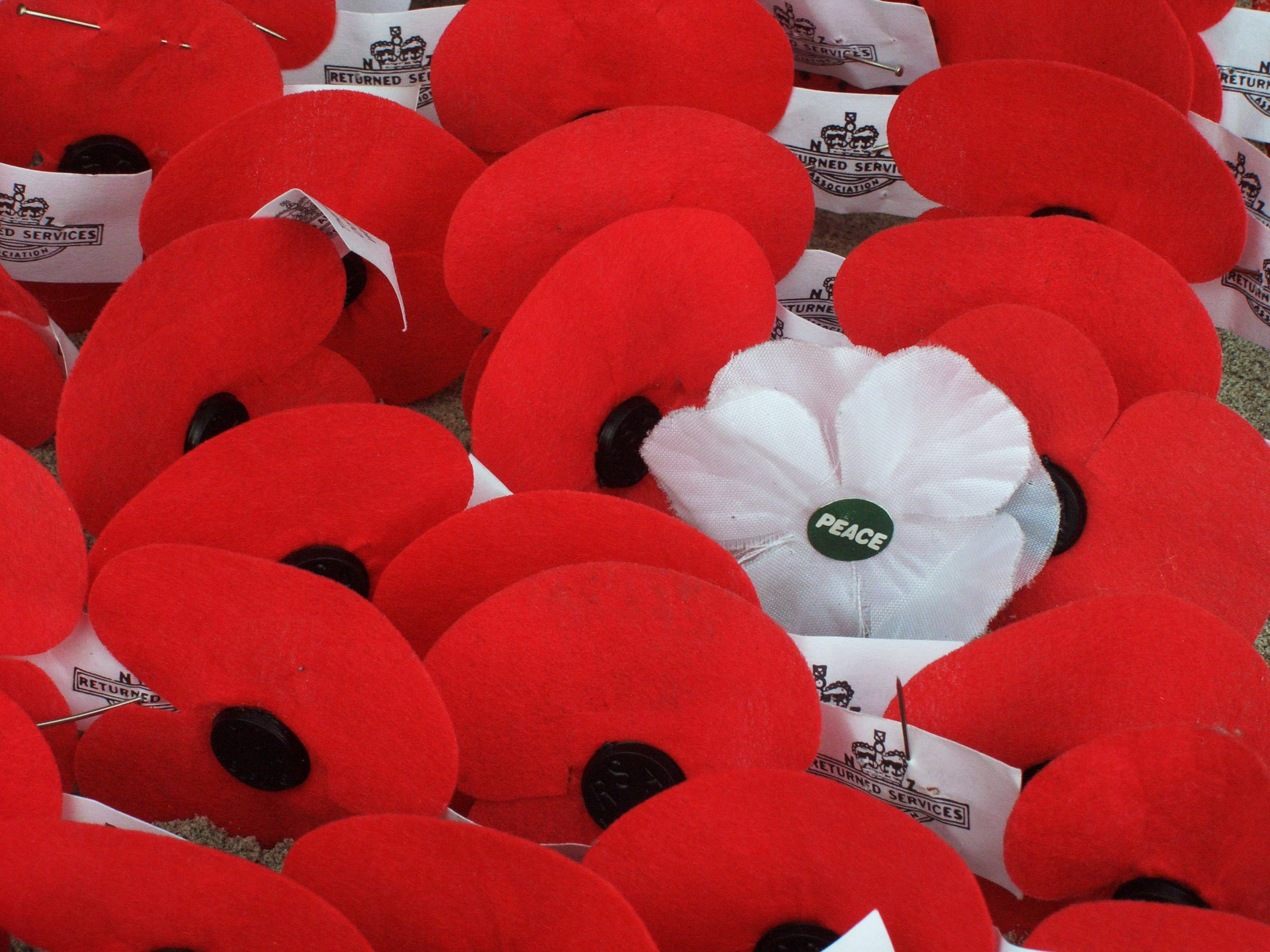
Artificial poppies placed as Anzac Day tributes on a cenotaph in New Zealand; mostly Papaver rhoeas marketed by the Royal New Zealand Returned and Services' Association, with a lone White Poppy

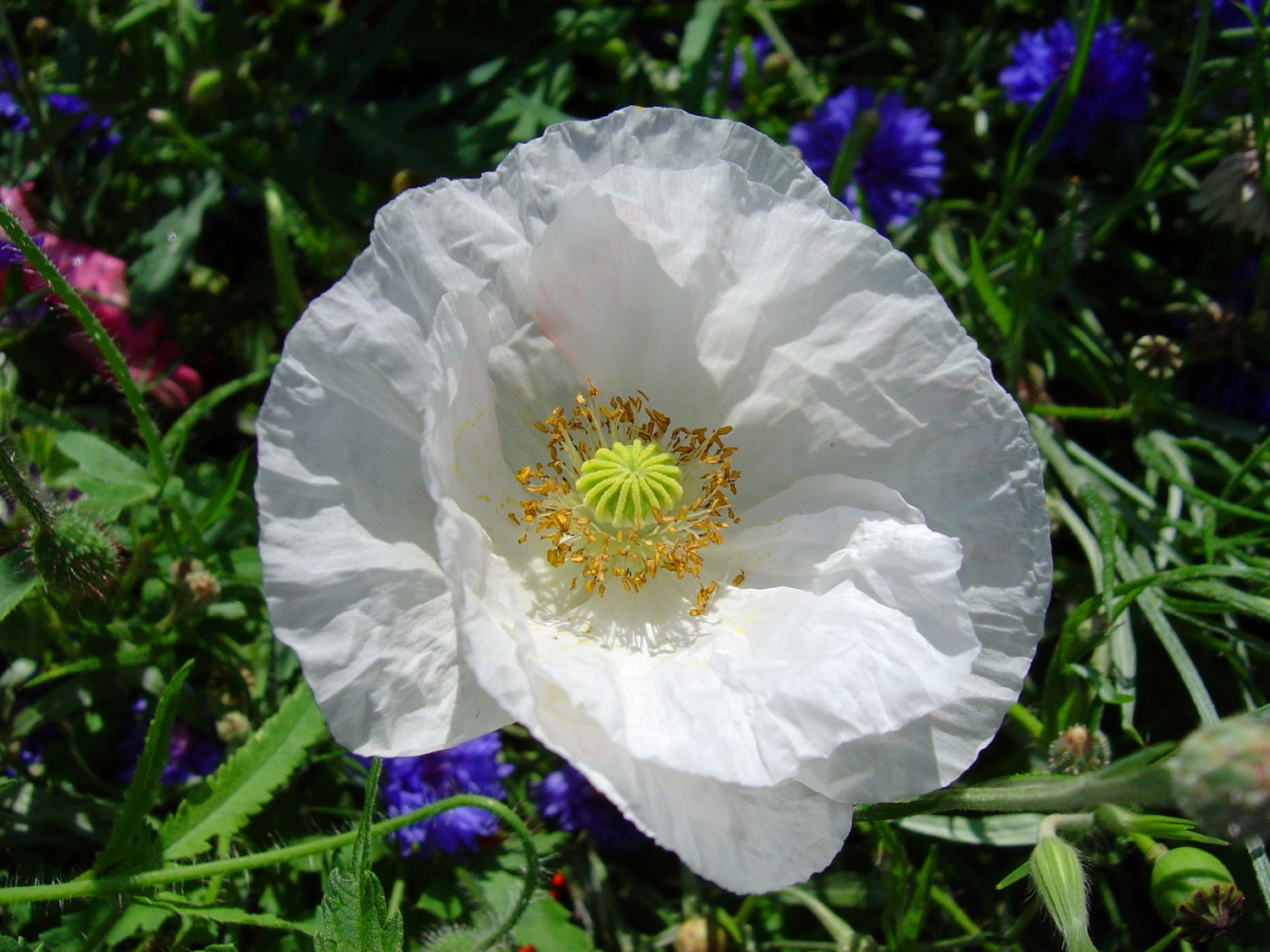
White poppy (Arctomecon merriamii)

The white poppy is a flower used as a symbol of peace, worn either in place of or in addition to the red remembrance poppy for Remembrance Day or Anzac Day.

== History ==
=== United Kingdom ===
In 1926, a few years after the introduction of the red poppy in the UK, the idea of pacifists making their own poppies was put forward by a member of the No More War Movement (as well as the proposal that the black centre of the British Legion's red poppies should be imprinted with "No More War"). Their intention was to remember casualties of all wars, with the added meaning of a hope for the end of all wars. However, they did not pursue the idea. The first white poppies were sold by the Co-operative Women's Guild in 1933. The Peace Pledge Union (PPU) took part in their distribution from 1936, and white poppy wreaths were laid from 1937 as a pledge to peace that war must not happen again. Anti-war organisations such as the Anglican Pacifist Fellowship now support the White Poppy Movement.

Those who promote the wearing of white poppies argue that the red poppy also conveys a specific political standpoint, and point to the divisive nature of the red poppy in Northern Ireland, where it is worn mainly by unionists but boycotted by Irish republicans.

Sales of white poppies steadily rose throughout the 2010s, often causing supporters of the PPU to become targets of abuse. On 1 November 2018 sales of white poppies were higher than in any previous year since white poppies were founded in 1933. As of 7 November 2018, 119,555 white poppies had been sold. The final figure was 122,385. The previous record was 110,000 white poppies in 2015. Until 2014, the record was around 80,000 in 1938.

In 2018, St John Ambulance in England allowed its volunteers to wear white poppies for the first time.

Those who endorse the white poppy campaign include actor Mark Rylance, poet Benjamin Zephaniah and rapper Lowkey.

Children's author Michael Morpurgo described his decision to wear a white poppy alongside his red one in a Radio Times article:

Wearing the red poppy for me is not simply a ritual, not worn as a politically correct nod towards public expectation. It is in honour of them, in respect and in gratitude for all they did for us. But I wear a white poppy alongside my red one, because I know they fought and so many died for my peace, our peace. And I wear both side by side because I believe the nature of remembrance is changing, and will change, as the decades pass since those two world wars.

=== New Zealand ===
In New Zealand, a White Poppy Annual Appeal has been run since 2009 by Peace Movement Aotearoa in the week preceding Anzac Day, with all proceeds going to White Poppy Peace Scholarships. The appeal was controversial for some, with Veterans' Affairs Minister Judith Collins describing the white poppy appeal as "incredibly disrespectful to those who served their country".

White poppies have also been worn in New Zealand to mark Remembrance Day. In previous years, the annual white poppy appeal was run as a fundraiser for the Campaign for Nuclear Disarmament around the time of Hiroshima Day in August. Responsibility for organising the annual appeal was transferred to Peace Movement Aotearoa, as the Campaign for Nuclear Disarmament in New Zealand closed down in 2008.

== Controversies ==
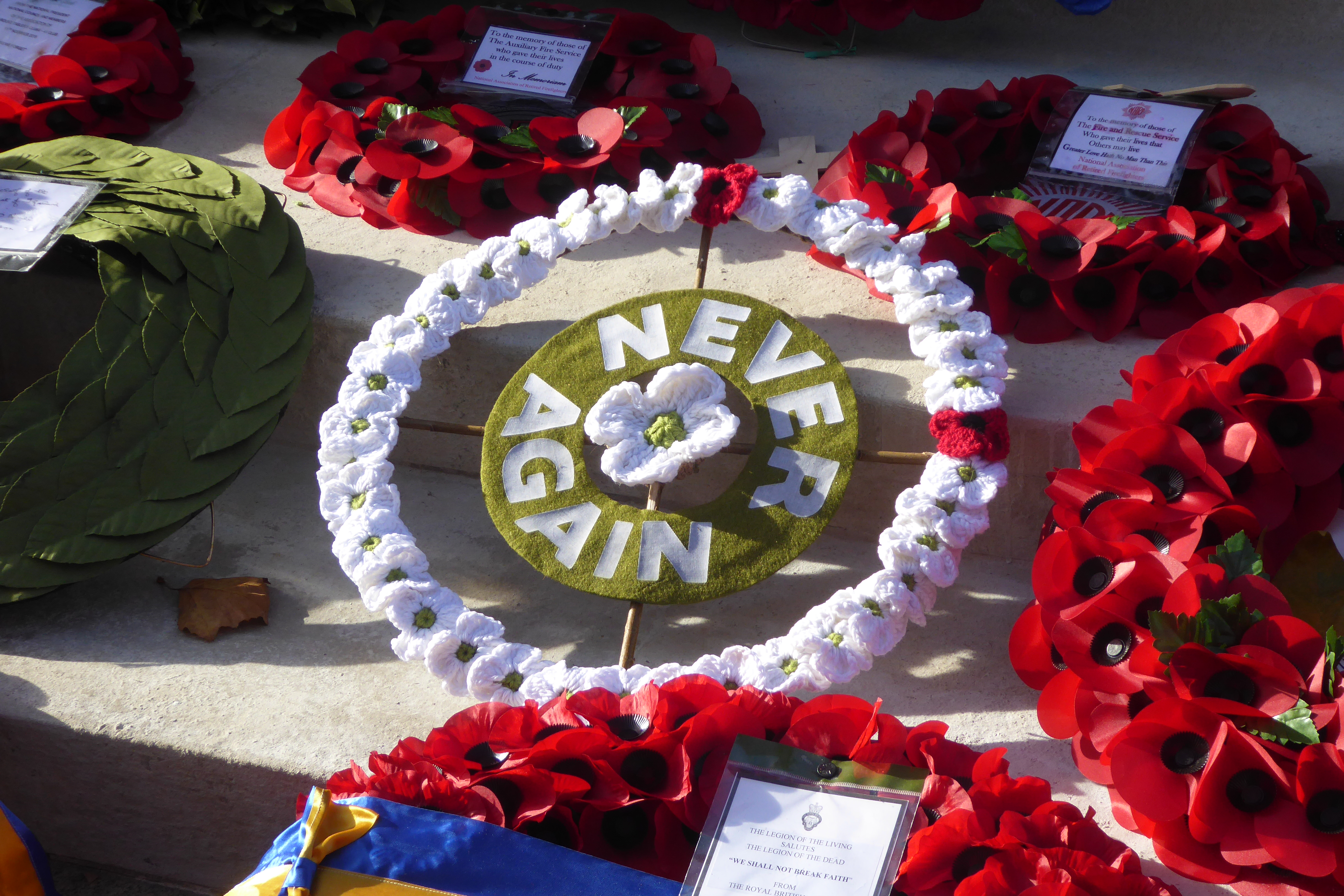
White poppy wreath at The Cenotaph, Whitehall in 2018, the centenary of the end of the First World War

The Royal British Legion has no official opinion on the wearing of white poppies, stating that it "is a matter of choice, the Legion doesn't have a problem whether you wear a red one or a white one, both or none at all", and that it defends the right to wear different poppies. Opponents of the white poppy argue that the traditional red poppy already encompasses the sentiments claimed for the white poppy, such as "remembering all victims of war", and consider that it undermines the message of remembrance. In the 1930s, when the white poppy was first established, some women lost their jobs for wearing them. Others are concerned that the money raised by the white poppy appeal may affect the funds raised for the Royal British Legion by the red poppy appeal.

In 1986, John Baker, Bishop of Salisbury, stated in his diocesan newsletter that he had been asked about the appropriateness of the white poppy. Baker responded "let's not be hurt if we see a white poppy...there is plenty of space for red and white to bloom side by side." Salisbury MP Robert Key disagreed, and later that year asked British prime minister Margaret Thatcher her opinion on the issue. Thatcher expressed her "deep distaste" for the symbol during prime minister's questions. In response, the White Poppy campaign received much media coverage in Britain. The Daily Star ran several articles criticising the White Poppy campaign. In The Guardian, artist Steve Bell published a cartoon satirising Thatcher's opposition to white poppies, which he allowed the Peace Pledge Union to republish.

In November 2014, white poppy wreaths on the Aberystwyth War Memorial had to be replaced after they were removed from the Memorial and thrown in a bin. There were similar reports of a white poppy wreath being removed from war memorials in Bath in 2018.

In 2018, UK Conservative MP Johnny Mercer tweeted that he thought white poppies were "attention seeking rubbish". Mercer's comments led to widespread media debate around the appropriateness of white poppies, with the Peace Pledge Union later crediting Mercer's comments as being responsible for the record level of sales that year. Mercer repeated these views in 2019, after being appointed as Minister for Defence People and Veterans in Boris Johnson's government, accusing white poppy wearers of “hijacking symbolism for their own ends”. His comments led to an open letter from multiple military veterans and the organisations that support calling on Mercer to apologise for his comments, and instead "spend energy on addressing homelessness and mental health among ex-servicemen and women".

In 2022 Scottish National Party politician Michelle Thomson MSP sparked controversy over wearing a homemade white poppy with a "Yes!" logo in the centre. Critics accused Thomson of being “tacky and tasteless” by using a commemorative poppy to campaign for Scottish independence. Thomson claimed that she had used the "Yes!" pin to secure the poppy to her lapel after her poppy "fell apart over the weekend", and that she had not intended to cause any offence.

== See also ==
- Purple poppy
