= Ice Age Fossils State Park =

State park in North Las Vegas, Nevada, United States

- Interactive map of Ice Age Fossils State Park
- Location: North Las Vegas, Nevada, United States
- Coordinates: 36°19′07″N 115°12′22″W
- Area: 315 acres (127 ha)
- Established: 2017
- Etymology: Ice age-era fossils found in the area
- Operator: Nevada Division of State Parks
- Open: Weekends 8am - 4:30pm
- Designation: Nevada state park
- Website: Official website

Ice Age Fossils State Park is a 315-acre state park in North Las Vegas, Nevada, United States, on the northernmost fringe of the metropolitan area. It is located adjacent to the Tule Springs Fossil Beds National Monument near Willie McCool Regional Park. The park saw its grand opening on January 20, 2024.

== History ==
Ice Age Fossils State Park was announced in January 2017 as part of Governor Brian Sandoval's $15 million "Explore Your Nevada" initiative. The grand opening of the visitor center and the park was January 20th, 2024. The park plans on adding to the visitor experience by adding a parking lot with restrooms near the Big Dig Trailhead and building a fossil repository and lab space behind the visitor center. The park originally was to be named Tule Springs State Park, but was named Ice Age Fossils State Park to avoid confusion with the Tule Springs Fossil Beds National Monument.

The park is located on land that was wetlands during the last Ice Age of Prehistoric Nevada between roughly 100,000 to 11,700 years ago. It is the site of excavations of fossils from animals that called this area home, such as Columbian mammoths, American lions, dire wolves, saber-toothed cats, ancient bison, camels, ground sloths, horses, and llamas. These animals and more have been found during the 1962–1963 "Big Dig" excavation and over the 120 year history of scientific exploration in the area.

== Vegetation ==
Rare bear poppies among other endemic plant species can be found within the park.

== Activities and amenities ==
The park features a visitor center and network of trails leading to fossil beds and archaeological sites.
