= Centennial Hills Hospital =

Centennial Hills Hospital Medical Center
- Universal Health Services; Valley Health System

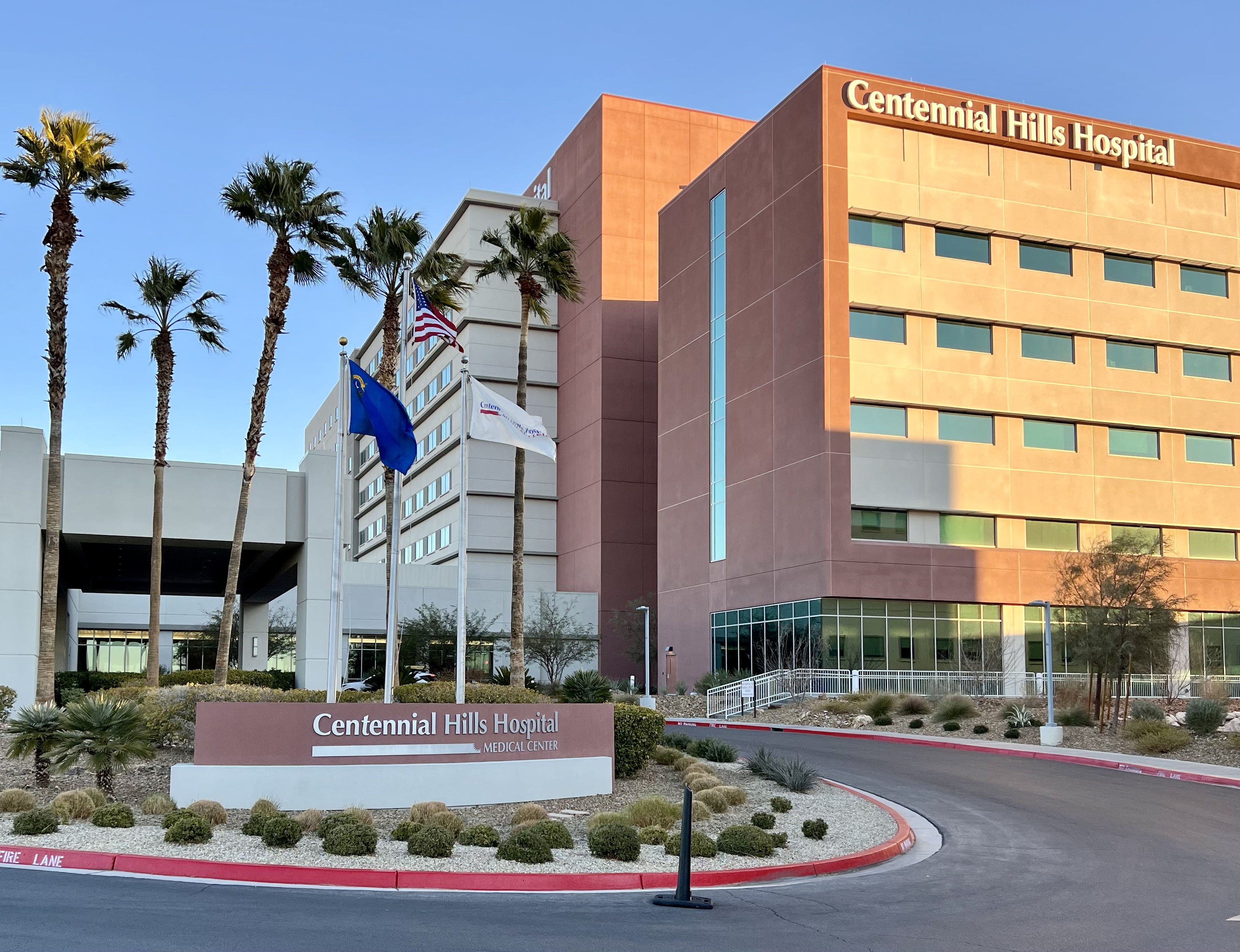
- Centennial Hills Hospital

Geography
- Location: 6900 North Durango Drive; Las Vegas, Clark County, Nevada, U.S.
- Coordinates: 36°17′12″N 115°17′10″W

Organisation
- Care system: Private
- Type: Community
- Affiliated university: None
- Network: Universal Health Services; Valley Health System

Services
- Standards: Joint Commission
- Emergency department: Yes
- Beds: 226

Helipads
- Helipad: Yes

History
- Founded: January 21, 2008; 18 years ago

Links
- Website: centennialhillshospital.com
- Lists: Hospitals in U.S.

Centennial Hills Hospital Medical Center is a for-profit hospital owned by Universal Health Services and operated by Valley Health System located in the Centennial Hills neighborhood in Las Vegas, Nevada, United States at 6900 North Durango Drive near Interstate 11/U.S. Route 95 and Clark County 215. The hospital has 226 beds and an area of 354,000 sq ft (32,900 m^{2}), The campus includes two medical office buildings.

== History ==
The hospital opened its eight-story tower on January 21, 2008, having originally planned to open in Autumn 2007. The building included 52,000 square feet (4,800 m^{2}) of space for future expansion. It is the first tobacco-free campus in Nevada. Centennial Hills Hospital Medical Center was the first medical facility in the state to offer the scanning system known as the O-arm.

In 2015 the daughter of Amy Vilela was turned away from Centennial Hills Hospital because of a lack of health insurance after having presented symptoms of a deep vein thrombosis. She later died when the blood clot broke off and became a pulmonary embolism This led to Vilela fighting for single-payer healthcare system or commonly called as "Medicare for All".

== Services ==
- Emergency department and Fast Track staffed with emergency medicine-trained physicians and registered nurses certified in ACLS and PALS.
- Accredited chest pain center with PCI
- Accredited primary stroke center
- Accredited heart failure center
- Therapeutic hypothermia certified medical center
- Women's center with level II NICU
- ICU
- Computed tomography
- MRI
- Nuclear medicine
- Respiratory therapy
- Minimally invasive surgical center
- Endoscopy
- Cardiology
- Radiology
- Orthopedic surgery

== Heliport ==
A helipad is available for emergency air ambulance service.

== Awards and accolades ==
- Certified by The Joint Commission for Primary Stroke Centers as an Advanced Primary Stroke Center
- Accredited Chest Pain Center
- Accreditation from the American Heart Association and American Stroke Association for success in using "Get with the Guidelines" program to improve quality of care for heart disease and stroke patients
- 2014 Leader in LGBT Healthcare Equality by the Human Rights Campaign (HRC) Foundation.
