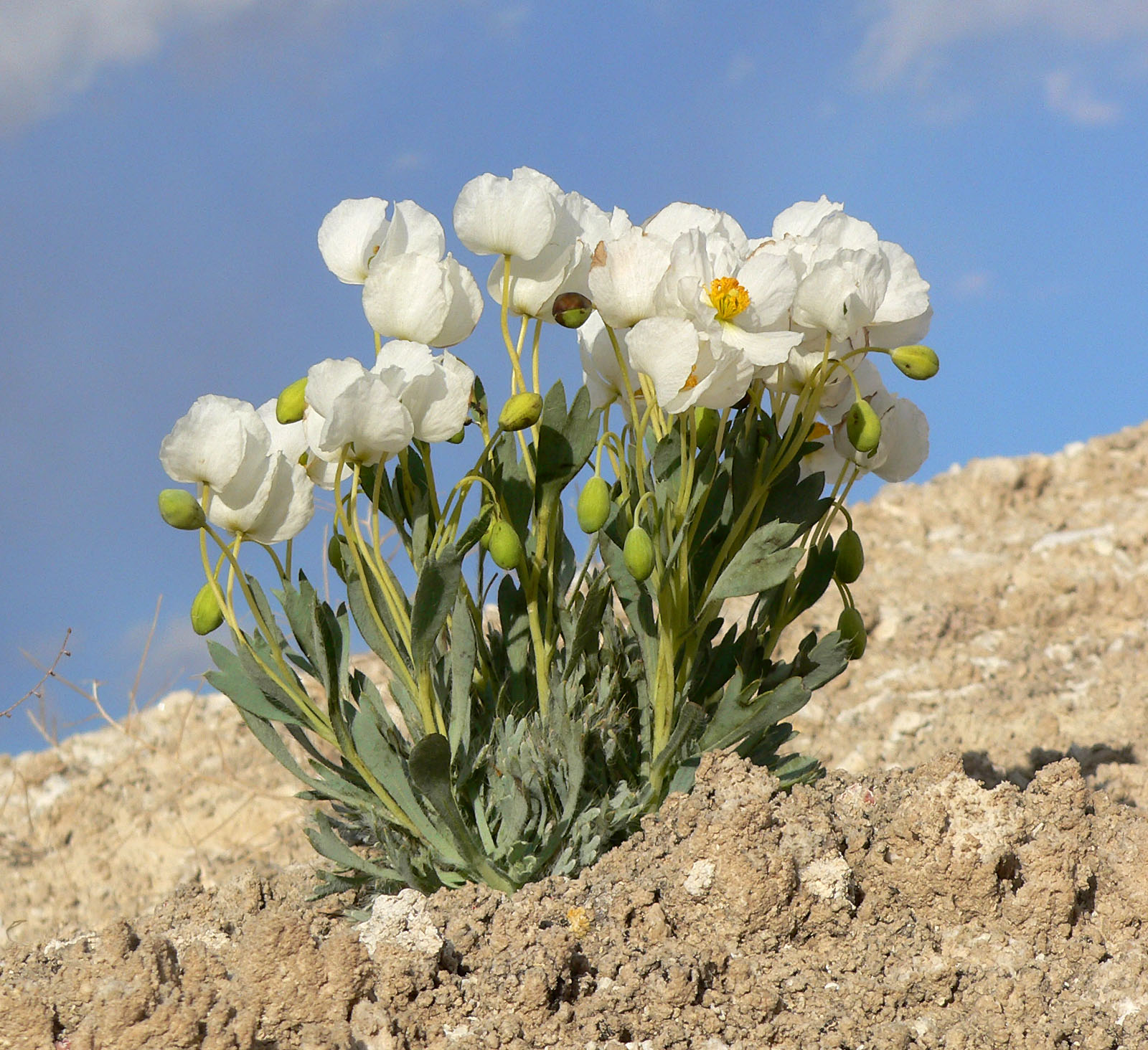

Conservation status
- Endangered (ESA)

Scientific classification
- Kingdom: Plantae
- Clade: Tracheophytes
- Clade: Angiosperms
- Clade: Eudicots
- Order: Ranunculales
- Family: Papaveraceae
- Genus: Arctomecon
- Species: A. humilis

Binomial name
- Arctomecon humilis Coville

= Arctomecon humilis =

Arctomecon humilis Dwarf bear-poppy

Species of flowering plant

Arctomecon humilis is an endangered flowering plant species in the family Papaveraceae. It is endemic to the Dixie Corridor in southwest Utah. A. humilis grows in a very harsh desert environment, requiring a specific soil type. The plant's common name is dwarf bear-poppy, which is indicative of the plant's jagged, three-"clawed" leaves. The poppy is a perennial plant, blooming annually. The dwarf bear-poppy is protected under the Endangered Species Act as of 1979. The plant is threatened by urban development, off-road vehicle use, and mining. Although hard to estimate, its population has diminished significantly over the years. There are several plans to protect the poppy, including making the land it occurs on a protected area.

== Description ==
The sage-green leaves of the dwarf bear-poppy are covered in small, soft hairs. At the tip of each leaf there are three ridges, which can either be rounded or pointed. Each ridge has a larger, sharper hair that sticks out. The ridges are smaller and more rounded than those higher up the stem. The plant gets its name from the resemblance the leaves have to a bear paw. The stems of the plant are a light yellow-green color. The stems grow between 2 and 9 cm (0.8 and 3.5 in) tall and lift the flowers above the leaves of the plant.

Dwarf bear-poppy plants form in individual clusters. These clusters, which include the stems and flowers, can grow up to 25 cm (10 in) in height. Each cluster can produce around 20-30 flowers, while the largest plants can produce up to 400 flowers. The flowers often cover the entire top of the plant. Each flower of the dwarf bear-poppy consists of four circular, white petals that surround the yellow stamens and green pistil in the center. Flower buds may be seen drooping while waiting to bloom.

== Life history ==
The dwarf bear-poppy is a perennial flower. This means that the poppy lives longer than two years. The life cycle of these plants is separated into four main growing seasons. The poppy produces flowers for the first time in April and May during its second growing season. At this stage, a quarter of dwarf bear-poppies can produce 1-4 flowers per plant. In the third season, under a third of the plants have blossomed and produced 23 flowers per plant on average. By the fourth growing season, almost all plants have produced around 34 flowers. Seeds can be produced between the second and fourth growing seasons during periods of high rainfall. The dwarf bear-poppy has a short lifespan and rarely lives over ten years.

== Ecology ==
=== Pollinators ===
The pollinators of the dwarf bear-poppy have shifted over time. The Mojave poppy bee (Perdita meconis) and the bee Eucera quadricincta once helped the poppy cross-pollinate. These bees are specialist pollinators, meaning they only pollinate certain plants. However, the poppy now relies on an invasive generalist pollinator, the Africanized honey bee (Apis mellifera scutellata). Generalist pollinators have no plant preference but prefer areas with high flower densities. The Africanized honey bee uses more food and land resources. Thus, the Africanized honey bee outcompetes native bee species. As a result, the native bees are no longer present in the range of the dwarf bear-poppy.

=== Reproductive strategies ===
The dwarf bear-poppy reproduces sexually by seeds. Seeds can be produced through self-fertilization or cross-pollination. This means that the plant can both pollinate itself and other plants of the same species. While beneficial for a plant to pollinate itself, it is not as productive. More seeds and fruit are produced through cross pollination than through self-fertilization.

Seeds of a dwarf bear-poppy can be dispersed by wind, but are usually dispersed by ants and rodents. Animals and ants are attracted to the fleshy covering over the seeds called the aril. After dispersal, the seeds stay dormant, or inactive, in the soil to continue developing. Remaining in the soil for long periods of time is important to the survival of the species. The maturation stages of the seeds vary so that they begin to grow during ideal conditions. These mechanisms allow the dwarf bear-poppy to survive the harsh, dry conditions of the desert environment.

Large distances between poppy plants have a negative effect on reproductive success. More than three quarters of all poppies are not near another poppy plant. This limits the plants reproductive ability and seed production. In order to have high reproductive success, population density must be high.

=== Habitat ===
The dwarf bear-poppy is found in areas of southwestern Utah around St. George. In these areas, parts of the Moenkopi Formation are present. The Moenkopi Formation is a geologic formation that occurs across several southwestern states and is characterized by mineral-rich soil. This soil, called "badland" soil, is prone to erosion and rich in gypsum. The dwarf bear-poppy requires this soil type. The plant also requires a biological soil crust composed of microscopic plants and fungi. Biological soil crusts help the poppy grow. The crust is effective at carbon cycling and nitrogen cycling and is more resistant to erosion. However, these soil crusts, which take hundreds of years to form, are easily damaged by off-road vehicle use and construction.

The dwarf bear-poppy lives in hilly, unvegetated habitat at high elevations. Poppies can be found at an elevation around 850–910 meters (2,800–3,000 ft). Although precipitation varies across the poppy's limited range, the average precipitation is 20 mm (0.8 in) annually. Precipitation is one of the key requirements of the poppy, followed by geology and soil content.

=== Range ===
The dwarf bear-poppy's range is limited by its habitat requirements. Currently, the poppy grows in the undeveloped areas around St. George, Utah.

== Conservation ==
=== Population size ===
There is no set number for the population size of the dwarf bear-poppy. Calculating the total population size is difficult due to the inability to determine the number of dormant seeds in the soil. There is also a large area of land that has not been searched for the presence of the dwarf bear-poppy. However, there are around eight distinct populations of the poppy, which are spread throughout the St. George, Utah area.

=== Past and current geographical distribution ===
The dwarf bear-poppy is only present in areas surrounding St. George, Utah. The dwarf bear-poppy once grew extensively throughout southwest Utah, where it was discovered in 1874. In 1960, I-15 highway construction split the population in half. Plant populations continued to decline as urbanization in the area increased. This decrease is due to human development and obstacles to pollen transfer. As a result, the dwarf bear-poppy is only found in Washington County. The poppy's range is restricted to a half-circle boundary around the city of St. George. In theory there is a large area of land that would suit the poppy, but many human factors restrict the dwarf bear-poppy's range. The plant currently occupies all viable habitat.

=== Major threats ===
==== Past ====
The dwarf bear-poppy has faced several major threats in the past. When the dwarf bear-poppy was listed, Utah had no laws protecting endangered plants. Since the dwarf bear-poppy is located in Utah it could not be protected. The Bureau of Land Management (BLM) then became responsible for the protection of the dwarf bear-poppy. The BLM created and enforced legislation for conservation. However, this legislation was typically enforced poorly or completely ignored. There was little enforcement of off-road vehicle use. This allowed for off-road vehicles to drive through dwarf bear-poppy land, resulting in a decline in population size. Additionally, construction of the I-15 highway and other roads caused severe habitat fragmentation. This development resulted in smaller, poor quality habitats for the dwarf bear-poppy and split the existing populations in half. Strip miners in St. George harvested the gypsum from the soil, leaving the dwarf bear-poppy with nutrient poor soil. The dwarf bear-poppy has also been exploited in the past for its decorative value. Gardeners in Utah tried to transplant the dwarf bear-poppy into their own home gardens. These attempts usually failed and further reduced the plant's population.

==== Current ====
The dwarf bear-poppy's current threats are related to human interference. The soil of the dwarf bear-poppy has a thick outer-crust. This crust comes from microbes and takes hundreds of years to form. Off-road vehicles and recreation have begun to erode the crust, leading to habitat and soil degradation.

Climate change is also a threat to the dwarf bear-poppy. Scientists suggest that warming between 2 and 5 degrees Celsius could threaten these plants. However, there is currently not enough evidence to know how the dwarf bear-poppy will respond to this increased temperature. Development and urbanization continue to threaten the dwarf bear-poppy.

The dwarf bear-poppy is also harmed by natural changes. Utah has between 800 and 1000 wildfires per year. These fires have been a major threat to these plants. The dwarf bear-poppy also faces competition with other plant species. Invasive plants like the red brome (Bromus rubens) and cheatgrass (Bromus tectorum) take up nutrients and space. Because the dwarf bear-poppy has very specific biological requirements, it is often out-competed.

==== Future ====
Pollinator diversity is not currently a threat to the species but may be in the future. Over time the number of specialist pollinators for the dwarf bear-poppy has declined due to competition. The dwarf bear-poppy now has to rely on generalist pollinators. Generalist pollinators also prefer to pollinate a wide range of species. Generalist pollinators prefer to visit areas of high floral density. The dwarf bear-poppy plant distribution is very sparse. This means that generalist pollinators are less likely to visit the dwarf bear-poppy. As the dwarf bear-poppy population continues to decline, pollination is less likely to occur. A decrease in pollination leads to less reproductive success. The pollinator that the dwarf bear-poppy now relies on, the Africanized honey bee, is also experiencing a decline in population size. This change will negatively impact the dwarf bear-poppy population even further.

Another future threat to this dwarf bear-poppy comes from changes in its remaining habitat. Continued erosion and soil compaction, due to human activities, poses a serious threat for this species. Compaction of soil is harmful because it damages root systems and reduces the plant's ability to get nutrients. Additionally, the top crust that the dwarf bear-poppy depends on is beginning to erode and deteriorate. Both of these threats create an uninhabitable area for the poppy. If soil quality continues to decline, the dwarf bear-poppy will face extinction.

=== Listing under the ESA ===
The dwarf bear-poppy was formally listed as endangered by the Endangered Species Act (ESA) on December 6, 1979. It has no International Union for Conservation of Nature (IUCN) listing.

=== 5-Year review ===
The most recent 5-Year Review was published on September 29, 2016. This review includes information about the dwarf bear-poppy as well as threats and potential recovery plans. The most significant threats were land development, recreation, and loss of pollinators. Other threats included invasive species, small mammal predation, transplanting, mining, and insufficient regulations. The recovery plans were requested to be updated in this review. These factors will be reevaluated in the 2021 review, which is currently in progress. The review selected three criteria for recovery: reducing threats, protecting existing plants, and creating awareness for the dwarf bear-poppy.

At the time of the review, 8 populations of dwarf bear-poppy were considered. However, there is some uncertainty about other populations due to the plant's constantly changing abundance. Additionally, dormant dwarf bear-poppy seeds also make population sizes hard to estimate.

The review states that land development continues to be a problem. Sudden changes in Utah bee populations was also listed as a potential threat. Specifically, the review was concerned about the loss of specialist pollinators as generalist pollinators have been proven to be unreliable. The review also found that recreation was a threat that would persist in the future. The majority of dwarf bear-poppy populations were threatened by recreational use. Over 119,000 meters (74 miles) of habitat have been disturbed.

The review addressed how lands owned by the Bureau of Land Management (BLM) are now protected areas for these plants. Fences have been put up by the BLM to prevent off-highway vehicle use in areas where the dwarf bear-poppy is present. However, no laws exist to protect dwarf-bear poppies on private land or reservations.

The review suggests that the Endangered Species Act listing alone has not been enough to enforce the protection of these plants. The listing of the dwarf bear-poppy by the BLM has contributed significantly to its conservation. The review states that land management designations by the BLM (through the Federal Land Policy and Management Act of 1976) have been very helpful for the poppy. However, this protection requires that the BLM continues to categorize the dwarf bear-poppy as a special status species.

Recommendations for the future were included in this review. The main goal is recovering the dwarf bear-poppy so that it can be removed from the endangered species list. The first steps include protection from development, reducing habitat loss, supporting pollinators, promoting research, growing seeds, and updating the recovery plan. Complete counts of smaller populations, reducing heavy land use, better law enforcement, research on species response, and working with city planners were all brought up as recommendations for future conservation efforts.

=== Species status assessment ===
No information currently available.

=== Recovery plan ===
The recovery plan was published on December 31, 1985. The plan supports stricter enforcement of the Bureau of Land Management regulations using investigations and fines. This is because many issues once stood in the way of conservation policies. For example, Utah had no laws protecting endangered plants. Another issue was that there was not enough information to support these laws. The recovery plan addressed this issue by encouraging better mapping and the further study of poppy populations. These efforts are meant to help create informed laws.

The recovery plan also suggested preserving the Moenkopi Formation, the habitat of the dwarf bear-poppy. The plan also claimed that future efforts should focus on growing more dwarf-bear poppies from seeds and plant tissues. The final focus of the recovery plan was to raise awareness of the dwarf bear-poppy. Awareness was raised by creating educational programs to inform the public on conservation efforts for the dwarf bear-poppy.

However, no updates have been made to the recovery plan since 1985. Since the recovery plan was published, there have been several actions to protect the dwarf bear-poppy. Mapping existing populations, posting informative signs at nature trails, and preventing off-highway vehicle use are just a few of these actions.

A critical habitat was not listed by the recovery plan due to insufficient mapping. However, it was implied that Washington County, Utah was a concern. While implementation of this plan is incomplete, it is in its final stages in most areas. Some actions taken include mapping existing populations, posting informative signs, and preventing off-highway vehicle use. Additionally, there have already been successes. New populations have been found in Warner Valley, Utah. Utah has also begun putting protections on dwarf-bear poppies in a desired development area called the Tonaquint block.
