= Prosper Goumond =

Prosper Goumond (December 10, 1876 – November 24, 1954), was a businessman who received the first gaming license issued in Las Vegas.

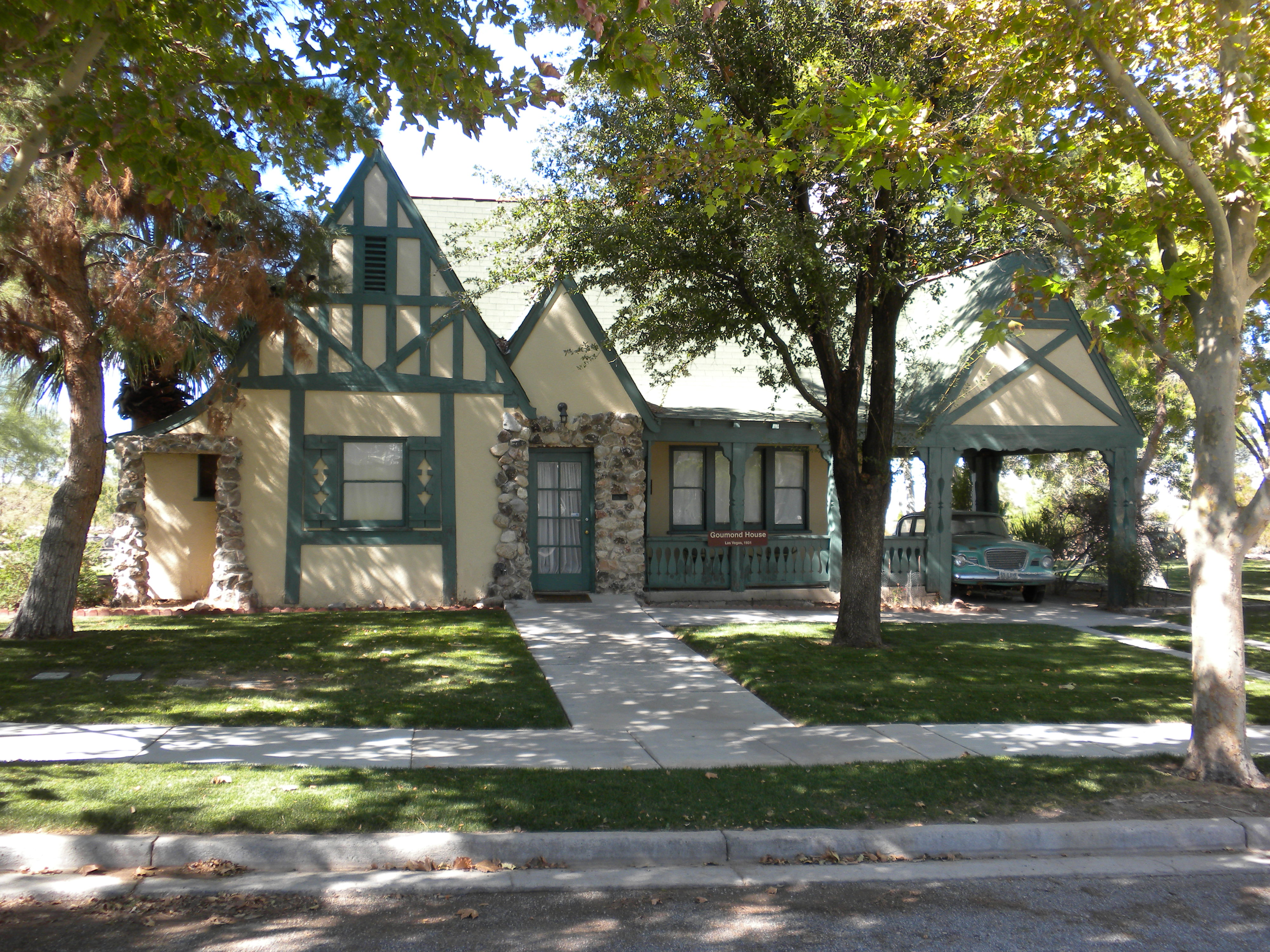
Prosper Goumond home at Clark County Heritage Museum

== Boulder Club ==
Goumond received the first gaming license issued in Las Vegas. He was a partner in the Boulder Club on Fremont Street; the club was established in 1929. In 1945, Yesco installed first neon sign in Las Vegas at the Boulder Club. A fire on November 25, 1956, caused extensive damage to the building which was by then the oldest gaming establishment in Las Vegas. The Boulder Club closed in 1960 when it was purchased by Benny Binion and became part of the Horseshoe Club.

Goumond was also a partner in the Hitchin' Post Motel.

== Tule Springs Ranch ==
On December 7, 1941, Goumond completed the purchase of property at Tule Springs Ranch. During the 1940s he developed the site into a dude ranch that catered to women taking advantage of Nevada's six-week residency requirement for divorce.

== Home ==
The Goumond house, built in 1931, was moved to the Clark County Museum in 1984.
