= Summerlin Parkway =

Highway in Nevada

State Route 613
- Summerlin Parkway
- SR 613 highlighted in red

Route information
- Maintained by NDOT
- Length: 5.513 mi (8.872 km)
- Existed: 1989–present
- History: Opened in 1989 as Summerlin Parkway; designated as SR 613 by January 2019

Major junctions
- West end: Future I-215 / CC 215 in Las Vegas
- SR 595 in Las Vegas
- East end: I-11 / US 95 in Las Vegas

Location
- Country: United States
- State: Nevada
- County: Clark

Highway system
- Nevada State Highway System; Interstate; US; State; Pre‑1976; Scenic
← SR 612	→ SR 647

Summerlin Parkway is a freeway in the western portion of the city of Las Vegas, Nevada, United States. It connects Clark County Route 215 (CC 215) to Interstate 11/U.S. Route 95 (I-11/US 95) and serves the master-planned community of Summerlin. In January 2019, the entire freeway was designated State Route 613 (SR 613) by the Nevada Department of Transportation (NDOT).

== Route description ==
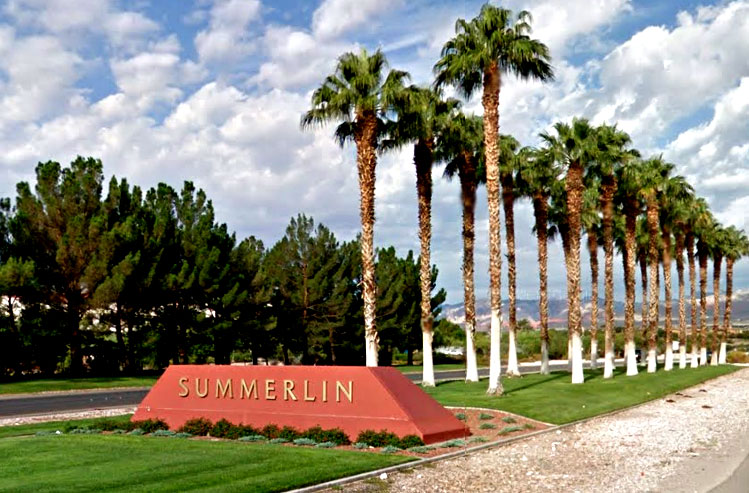
Summerlin community sign in the median of Summerlin Parkway as seen in 2016

Summerlin Parkway begins at the convergence of a one-way pair (Note: Sunset Run Drive for westbound traffic; Sky Vista Drive for eastbound traffic.) near a signalized junction with access ramps to the Las Vegas Beltway (CC 215) and partial access to Far Hills Avenue. The highway becomes a full freeway just east of the intersection and maintains this status as it heads eastward through Summerlin and Las Vegas. It has interchanges with (from west to east) Anasazi Drive, Town Center Drive, Rampart Boulevard, Durango Drive (albeit incomplete), and Buffalo Drive. The freeway terminates at the interchange with Rainbow Boulevard (SR 595) and I-11/US 95, locally known as the "Rainbow Curve" interchange.

== History ==
Summerlin Parkway was initially constructed by the developers of Summerlin through the Summerlin Homeowners Association. The first construction along the parkway, completed in 1989, consisted of rebuilding the US 95 interchange and constructing the divided highway west to Town Center Drive. Later projects funded by the Regional Transportation Commission of Southern Nevada brought freeway interchanges to Buffalo Drive in 1992 and Rampart Boulevard in 1994.

By 2000, Summerlin Parkway was built up to expressway standards to a western end at Anasazi Drive. By 2004, the expressway terminated at the Las Vegas Beltway. A half-interchange was added at Durango Drive by 2005, and the Anasazi Drive intersection was converted to an interchange by 2006. Also in 2005, the Nevada Department of Transportation (NDOT) had reconstructed the US 95/Rainbow Boulevard interchange as part of its US 95 widening project (including a new direct connection from eastbound Summerlin Parkway to US 95 north that was not constructed in 1989).

An HOV flyover has been constructed to facilitate HOV movements between Summerlin Parkway and US 95 heading to and from Downtown. The direct connection ramps opened in July 2012, even though Summerlin Parkway does not yet have HOV lanes.

In 2016, the City of Las Vegas installed a median cable barrier system in the median of Summerlin Parkway. The $2-million project ($2.63 million in 2025) was designed to reduce impacts from drivers losing control of vehicles into the landscaped median and prevent crossover collisions.

In early 2017, several operational improvements along Summerlin Parkway were completed. The HOV lanes from US 95 were extended westward from Buffalo Drive to Durango Drive, and new auxiliary lanes were completed westbound to Rampart Boulevard, both directions between Rampart Boulevard and Town Center Drive, and eastbound between the CC 215 interchange and Anasazi Drive.

By January 2019, maintenance responsibility for Summerlin Parkway had been transferred from the City of Las Vegas to NDOT; NDOT designated the freeway as SR 613.

In February 2025, construction began at the interchange of Summerlin Parkway, the Las Vegas Beltway, and Far Hills Avenue. The interchange upgrade project will add a new flyover ramp between CC 215 south and SR 613 east, eliminate most traffic lights, (Note: However, Summerlin Parkway eastbound and the off-ramp from CC 215 northbound to Sunset Run Drive westbound will have an at-grade intersection with traffic signals) directly connect Far Hills Avenue to CC 215 north, connect Summerlin West to Summerlin Parkway, and add new pedestrian bridges that will connect the Western Beltway Trail to the Bonanza Trail. As of June 2026, the interchange is under construction. It is expected to be finished by 2028.

== Exit list ==
The entire route is in Las Vegas, Clark County.

mi	km	Exit	Destinations	Notes
0.0	0.0		Sunset Run Drive west / Sky Vista Drive east	Closed to through traffic until the interchange upgrade project is completed; westbound lanes continue as Sunset Run Drive; Sky Vista Drive feeds into eastbound lanes
0.0– 0.2	0.0– 0.32		Future I-215 / CC 215	At-grade intersection; western terminus; CC 215 exit 28; interchange upgrade under construction as of April 2026
0.0– 0.2	0.0– 0.32	Western end of freeway		
0.42	0.68		Far Hills Avenue	Under construction as of June 2026; westbound exit and eastbound entrance
1.3	2.1	0	Anasazi Drive	
2.4	3.9	1	Town Center Drive	Serves Summerlin Hospital
3.7	6.0	3	Rampart Boulevard	
4.2	6.8		Durango Drive	Western end of HOV lane; westbound exit and eastbound entrance
5.2	8.4		Buffalo Drive	No westbound exit from HOV lane; serves Darling Tennis Center and Kellogg Zaher Sports Complex
5.7	9.2	♦	I-11 south / US 95 south	Eastbound exit and westbound entrance; I-11/US 95 north exit 81C
6.0	9.7		Rainbow Boulevard (SR 595)	Eastbound exit only; I-11/US 95 north exit 81B and south exit 81
6.1	9.8		I-11 north / US 95 north – Reno	Eastbound exit and westbound entrance; I-11/US 95 south exit 81
6.1	9.8		I-11 south / US 95 south – Las Vegas	Eastern terminus; I-11/US 95 north exit 81A
1.000 mi = 1.609 km; 1.000 km = 0.621 mi: HOV only; Incomplete access; Unopened
