= Centennial Hills Park =

Regional park in Las Vegas, Nevada, United States

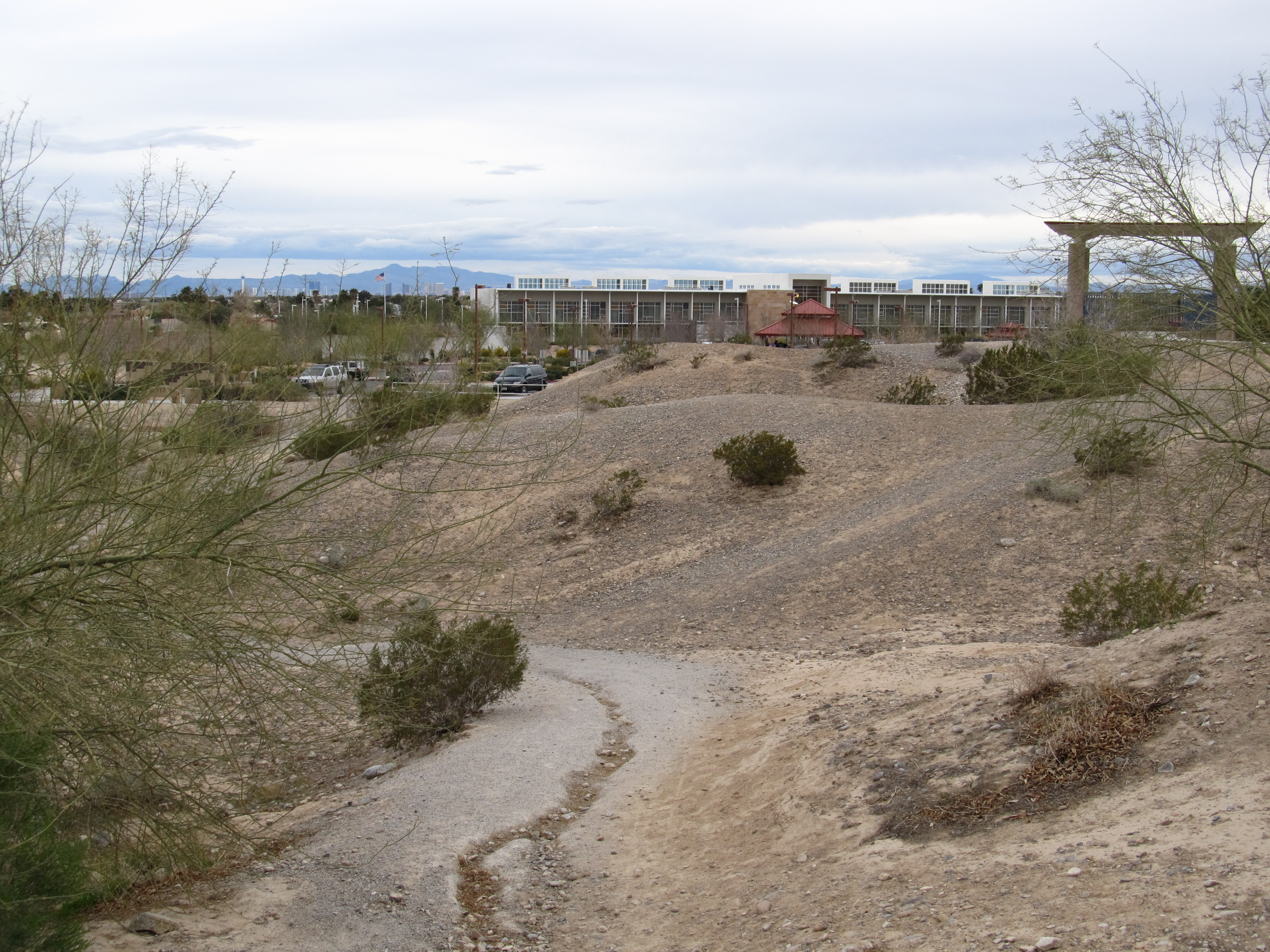
- Tule Springs Wash in Centennial Hills Park
- Interactive map of Centennial Hills Park
- Type: Regional park
- Location: 7101 North Buffalo Drive, Las Vegas, Nevada, United States 89131
- Coordinates: 36°17′13″N 115°15′46″W
- Area: 160 acres (65 ha)
- Etymology: Centennial Hills
- Operator: City of Las Vegas
- Website: Centennial Hills Park

Centennial Hills Park, formerly known as Deer Springs Park, is a 120-acre regional park in Las Vegas, Nevada, United States, located in the neighborhood of Centennial Hills. It is located next to the Centennial Hills Library.

== Activities and amenities ==
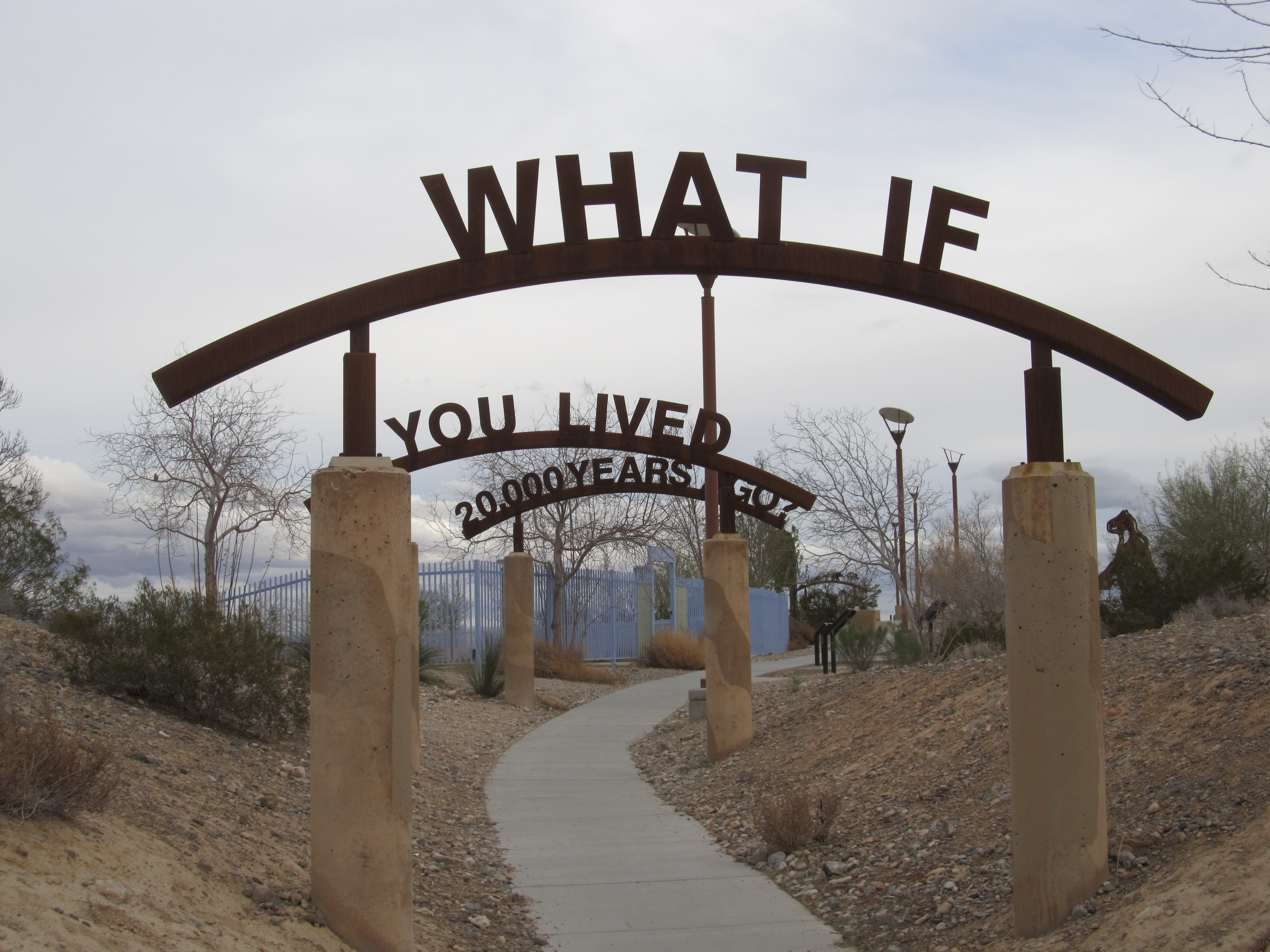
A trail in Centennial Hills Park

Centennial Hills Park is built on an inverted riverbed, the Tule Springs Wash and features prehistoric-themed trails, as well as two playgrounds, including a shaded playground near the trails for older children known by locals as the "dinosaur playground" and a garden-themed playground for younger children known as the "butterfly playground", each one featuring a splash pad. An amphitheater, a dog park, and soccer and football fields are also included within the park.
