= Willie McCool Regional Park =

Regional park in North Las Vegas, Nevada, United States

- Interactive map of Willie McCool Regional Park
- Type: Regional park
- Location: 4400 East Horse Drive, North Las Vegas, Nevada, United States 89131
- Coordinates: 36°18′49″N 115°11′56″W
- Area: 160 acres (65 ha)
- Created: 1991
- Etymology: William C. McCool
- Operator: City of North Las Vegas
- Website: Willie McCool Regional Park

Willie McCool Regional Park is a 160-acre regional park in North Las Vegas, Nevada, United States, located next to the Tule Springs Fossil Beds National Monument and Ice Age Fossils State Park. It is the northernmost park of the city park system.

== History ==
The original park was established in 1991. In 2004, it was named after US Navy Commander William Cameron "Willie" McCool, the pilot of Space Shuttle Columbia mission STS-107, in which he and the six other crew members were killed. Vacant land within the park is available for the development of future recreational uses, such as sports fields, picnic areas, and playgrounds.

== Amenities ==
=== Flying field ===
The Willie McCool Flying Field is a model airfield for radio-controlled aircraft located within the park. It is accessed with an Academy of Model Aeronautics (AMA) membership and the $20 annual flying field pass which can be purchased from the North Las Vegas Parks and Recreation Department after obtaining an AMA membership.

=== Experimental garden ===
The Master Gardener Orchard is an experimental garden located on the western side of the park, established by the University of Nevada, Reno (NUR) and the Cooperative State Research, Education, and Extension Service (CSREES) to test water usage and the adaptability of non-native plants in the desert climate of the Las Vegas Valley. CSREES was dissolved in 2009 and the garden is now operated by a group of UNR volunteers known as "Master Gardeners".
