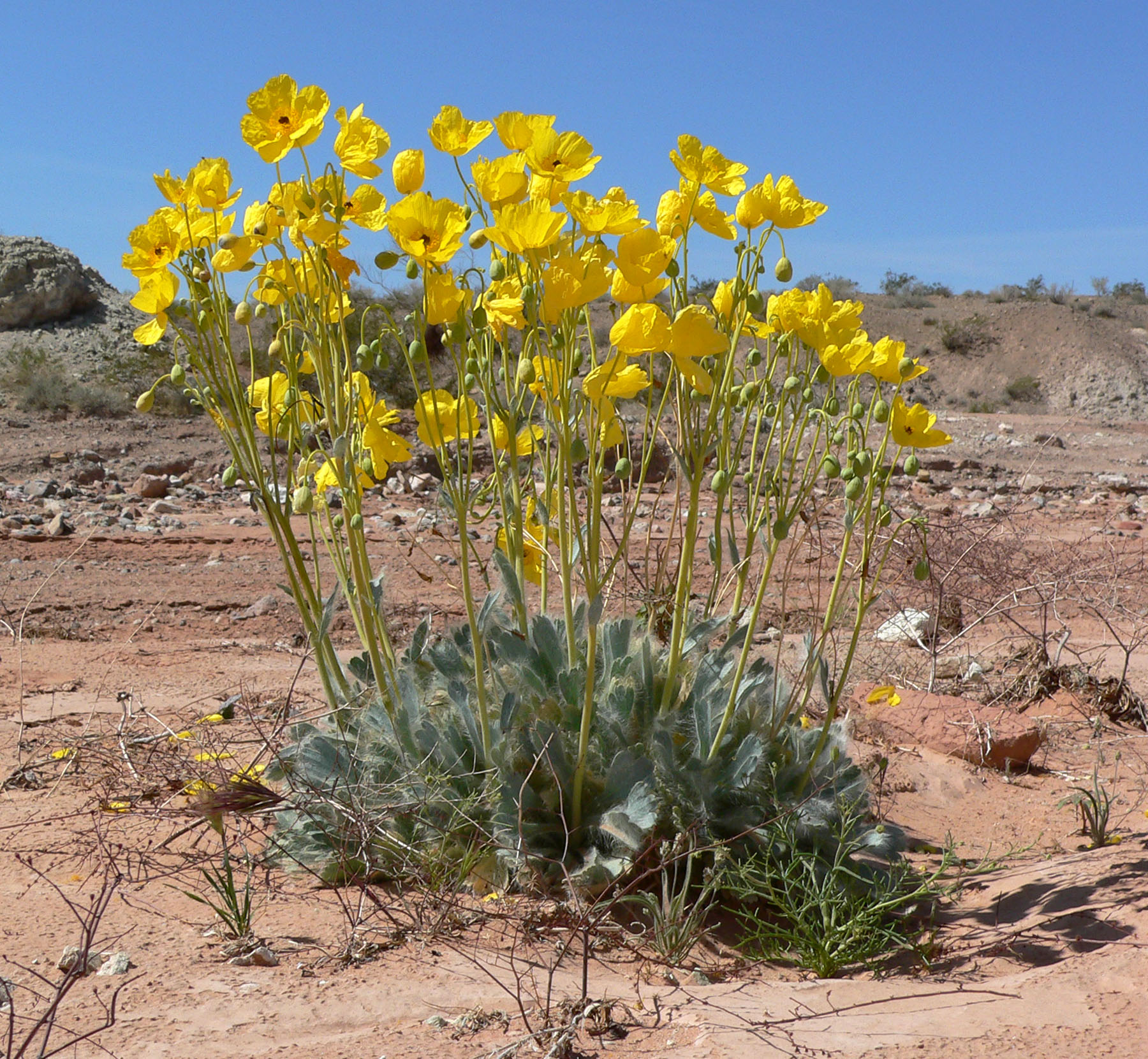

Conservation status
- Critically Imperiled (NatureServe)

Scientific classification
- Kingdom: Plantae
- Clade: Tracheophytes
- Clade: Angiosperms
- Clade: Eudicots
- Order: Ranunculales
- Family: Papaveraceae
- Genus: Arctomecon
- Species: A. californica

Binomial name
- Arctomecon californica Torr. & Frém.

= Arctomecon californica =

California bearpoppy

Species of flowering plant

Arctomecon californica is a species of poppy known by several common names, including California bearpoppy, Las Vegas bearpoppy, golden bearpoppy, and yellow-flowered desert poppy. It is a perennial herb that is native to the eastern Mojave Desert.

== Description ==
Arctomecon californica is a herbaceous perennial found in Creosote bush (Larrea tridentata) habitats, in barren shales with gypsum substrates, at 500–1,000 metres (1,600–3,300 ft) in elevation.

The plant flowers in mid spring with deep yellow petals from large buds on tall 1–3 feet branching inflorescences. Fruiting occurs in early summer.

== Distribution and habitat ==
Arctomecon californica is native to the eastern Mojave Desert: in areas around Las Vegas, Nevada such as Tule Springs; the Lake Mead area; in and around Las Vegas; and in extreme Mohave County in Northwestern Arizona. It is also known in Utah from a single collection in Washington County, characterized as having "apparently occurred in cultivation on private property".

== Conservation ==
The species has declined dramatically in recent decades. It was petitioned for listing on the US Endangered Species list, but the US Fish and Wildlife Service declared the listing Not Warranted in 2024. It is listed as a critically endangered and fully protected species in Nevada and is also protected in Arizona due to its rarity. It is declining in its primary habitat in Nevada. Populations have undergone a serious decline associated with land development and grazing and the growth in the European and Africanized honeybee population associated with the latter. Habitat fragmentation is a possible contributing factor to reduced levels of genetic variation in populations in the Las Vegas Valley.

== Ecology ==
Arctomecon californica is pollinated by a specialist bee, the Mojave poppy bee. Pollination occurs by female Mojave poppy bees who collect pollen from the plants to feed their young. The Mojave poppy bee is imperiled due to habitat loss.
