= Tule Springs Archaeological Site =

Coordinates: 36°19′20.84″N 115°16′9.6″W

- Tule Springs Archeological Site
- U.S. National Register of Historic Places
- Nevada Historical Marker
- Nearest city: Las Vegas
- NRHP reference No.: 79001461
- No.: 86
- Added to NRHP: April 20, 1979

Tule Springs Archaeological Site is an archaeological site listed on the National Register of Historic Places that is located in the Las Vegas Valley of Nevada, United States. It is one of a few sites in the United States where humans were once thought to have lived alongside, and potentially hunted, extinct Ice Age megafauna, although this view is not supported by the available scientific data and is no longer generally accepted.

The archaeological site is marked as Nevada Historical Marker 86 and is located within the Floyd Lamb Park at Tule Springs which is operated by the City of Las Vegas.

== History ==
In 1933, the Tule Springs Expedition, led by Fenley Hunter, was the first major effort to explore the archaeological importance of the area surrounding Tule Springs. Hunter and his team identified an unworked obsidian flake in apparent association with extinct Pleistocene faunal remains at Tule Springs

The Nevada State Museum explored the springs area in 1962 and 1963 confirming that the area was home to Ice Age species as well as early North American Paleo-Indian peoples. Richard Shutler directed the project, and Vance Haynes studied the sedimentary layers, using radiocarbon dating to determine their ages. Animals discovered include ground sloths, mammoths, prehistoric horses, American camels and the first giant condors found in Nevada.

The springs site was listed on the National Register of Historic Places on April 20, 1979.

== Notes ==
Preceded by Sutro	Nevada Historical Markers; 86	Succeeded by Savage Mansion
