= Lower Kyle Canyon, Nevada =

Unincorporated community in Nevada, US

Coordinates: 36.3154°N 115.2974°W

Lower Kyle Canyon is an unincorporated community in Clark County, Nevada.
