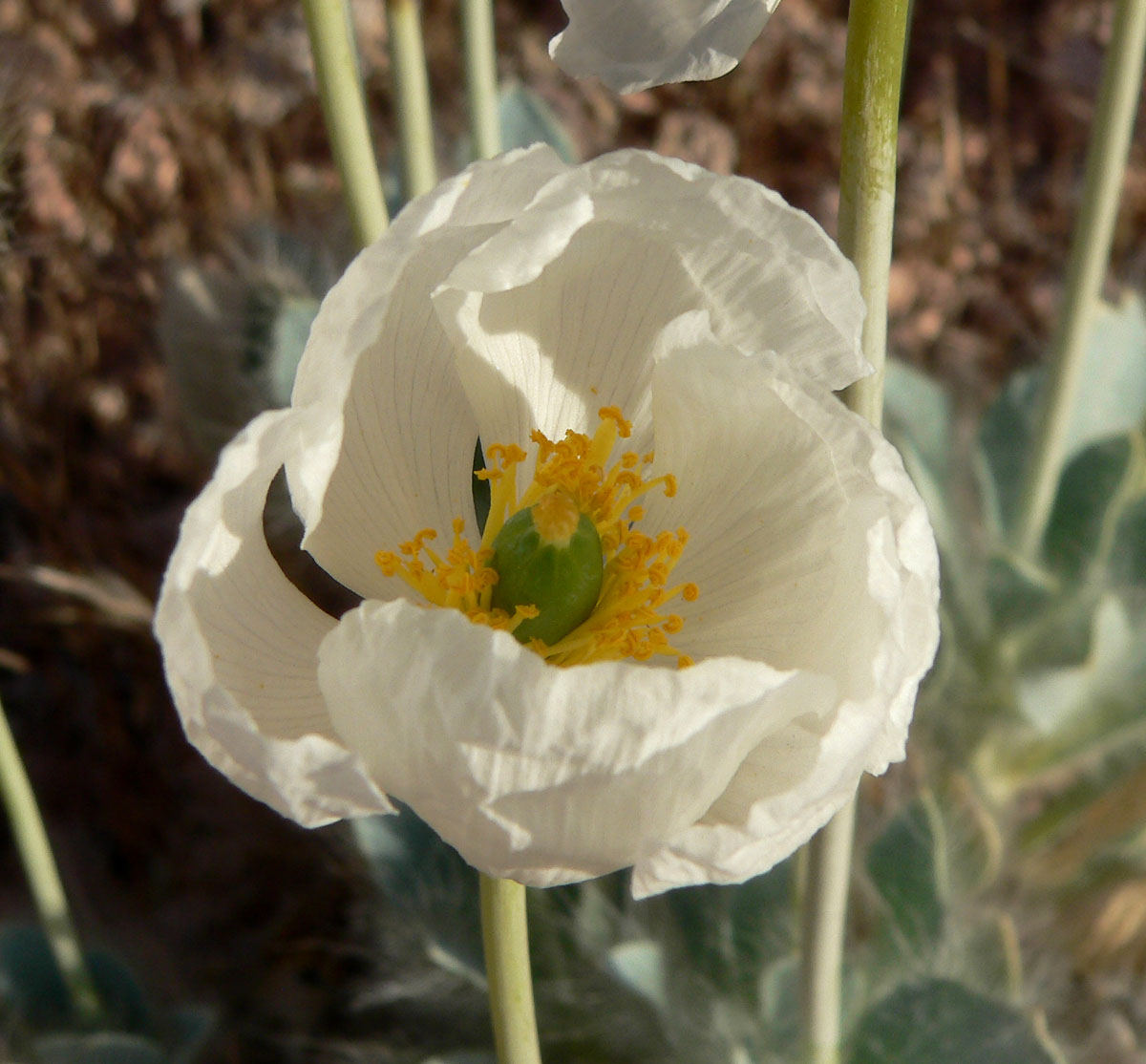

Conservation status
- Vulnerable (NatureServe)

Scientific classification
- Kingdom: Plantae
- Clade: Tracheophytes
- Clade: Angiosperms
- Clade: Eudicots
- Order: Ranunculales
- Family: Papaveraceae
- Genus: Arctomecon
- Species: A. merriamii

Binomial name
- Arctomecon merriamii Coville

= Arctomecon merriamii =

Species of flowering plant

Arctomecon merriamii is a species of poppy known by several common names, including desert bearpoppy, white bearpoppy, and great bearclaw poppy. It is native to the Mojave Desert of California and Nevada, and parts of southwestern Utah.

This is a taprooted perennial herb producing stout, waxy stems 20 to 50 centimetres (7.9 to 19.7 in) tall. Hairy pale green leaves with rounded teeth are located around the base of the plant. The inflorescence at the tip of each stem is composed of one white poppy flower with six petals up to 4 centimetres (1.6 in) long and green sepals covered in long, white hairs. The fruit is a capsule up to 3.5 centimetres (1.4 in) long containing many tiny seeds.

Botanist Frederick Vernon Coville was first to identify the plant, and named it after naturalist Clinton Hart Merriam, who accompanied Coville on the Death Valley Expedition, the first of a series of expeditions funded by the US Congress to map the flora (phytogeography) and fauna of the United States.
