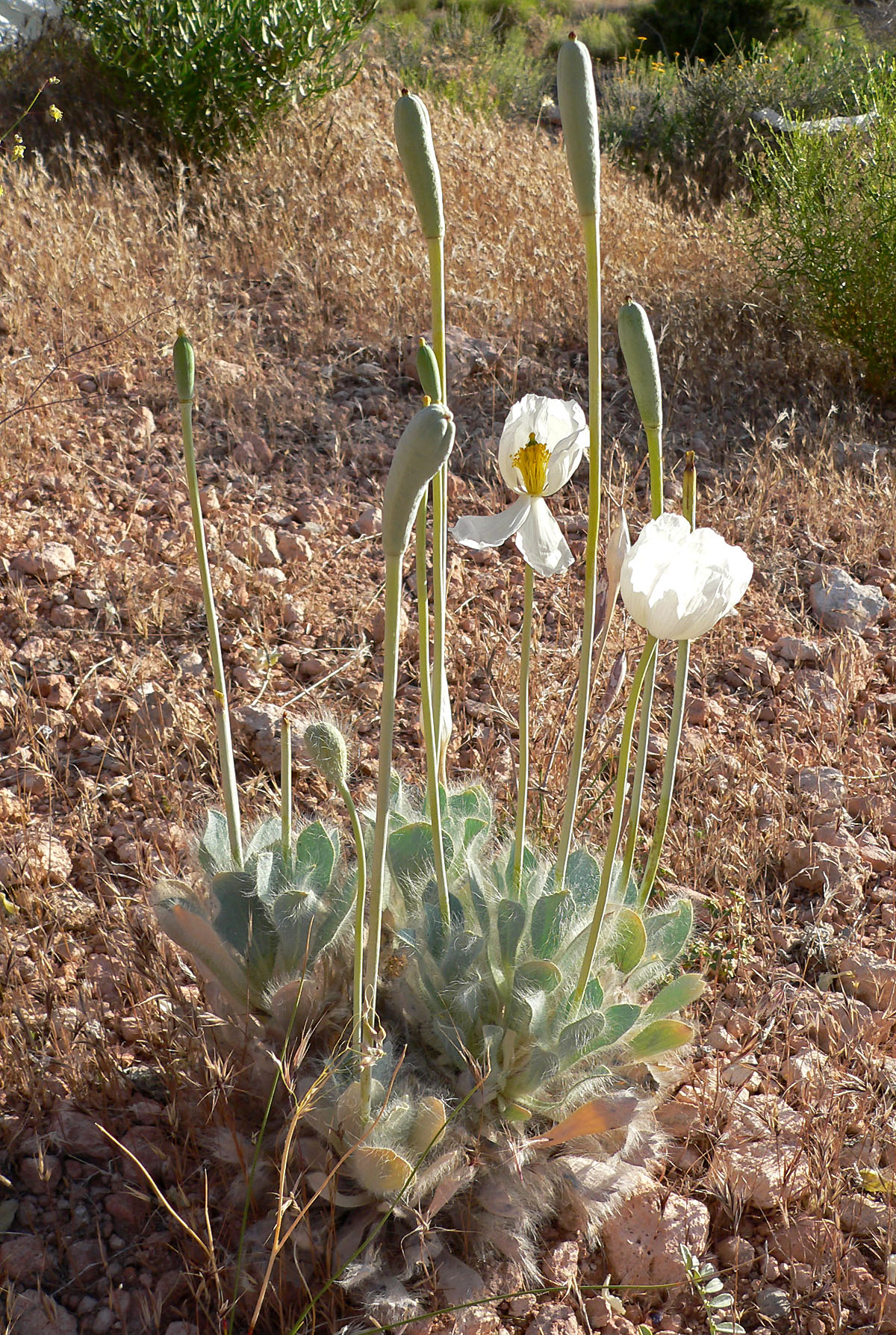
- Arctomecon merriamii

Scientific classification
- Kingdom: Plantae
- Clade: Tracheophytes
- Clade: Angiosperms
- Clade: Eudicots
- Order: Ranunculales
- Family: Papaveraceae
- Subfamily: Papaveroideae
- Tribe: Papavereae
- Genus: Arctomecon; Torr. & Frém.

Species
- Arctomecon californica; Arctomecon humilis; Arctomecon merriamii

= Arctomecon =

Genus of flowering plants

Arctomecon is a genus of the poppy family Papaveraceae commonly called the bear poppies or bear-paw poppies, after the distinctive appearance of the leaves. The three species occur only in the northeastern part of the Mojave Desert of North America, and are all uncommon.

The plants consist of one or a cluster of basal rosettes of leaves with a generally light blue or grey appearance. Closer examination shows the leaves to be generally wedge-shaped, with the end of each divided into several teeth, and entirely covered with long hairs 5–15 mm in length. The effect is that of a hairy bear paw, whence both common and scientific name (arktos bear + mecon poppy). The solitary terminal flowers are typical of poppies, with 2-3 sepals and 4-6 petals, either white or yellow, and starting out as nodding bud before become erect. The fruit capsule has 4-6 valves, opens from the top as it dries, releasing a handful of small wrinkled black seeds.

Arctomecon habitat is typically the harshest and driest soils of the Mojave, where few other plants survive. They especially seem to favor soils with a high gypsum content.

== Species ==
Image	Name	Description	Distribution
	Arctomecon californica, also known as the "Las Vegas bear poppy"	Largest of the genus, with stems up to 2 feet high and bright yellow flowers up to 3 inches across.	Its range centers around the hills east of Las Vegas, Nevada, in the Grand Canyon National Park, and in the Lake Mead National Recreation Area; it may occasionally be seen growing in vacant lots in the city
	Arctomecon humilis	White flowers, but is much smaller and shorter, and only sparsely hirsute.	It occurs only a small area near St. George, Utah.
	Arctomecon merriamii	Similar to A. californica, but has white flowers.	It occurs in the Mojave west and north of Las Vegas, as far as Death Valley.
