= Tule Springs Ranch =

- U.S. National Register of Historic Places
- U.S. Historic district
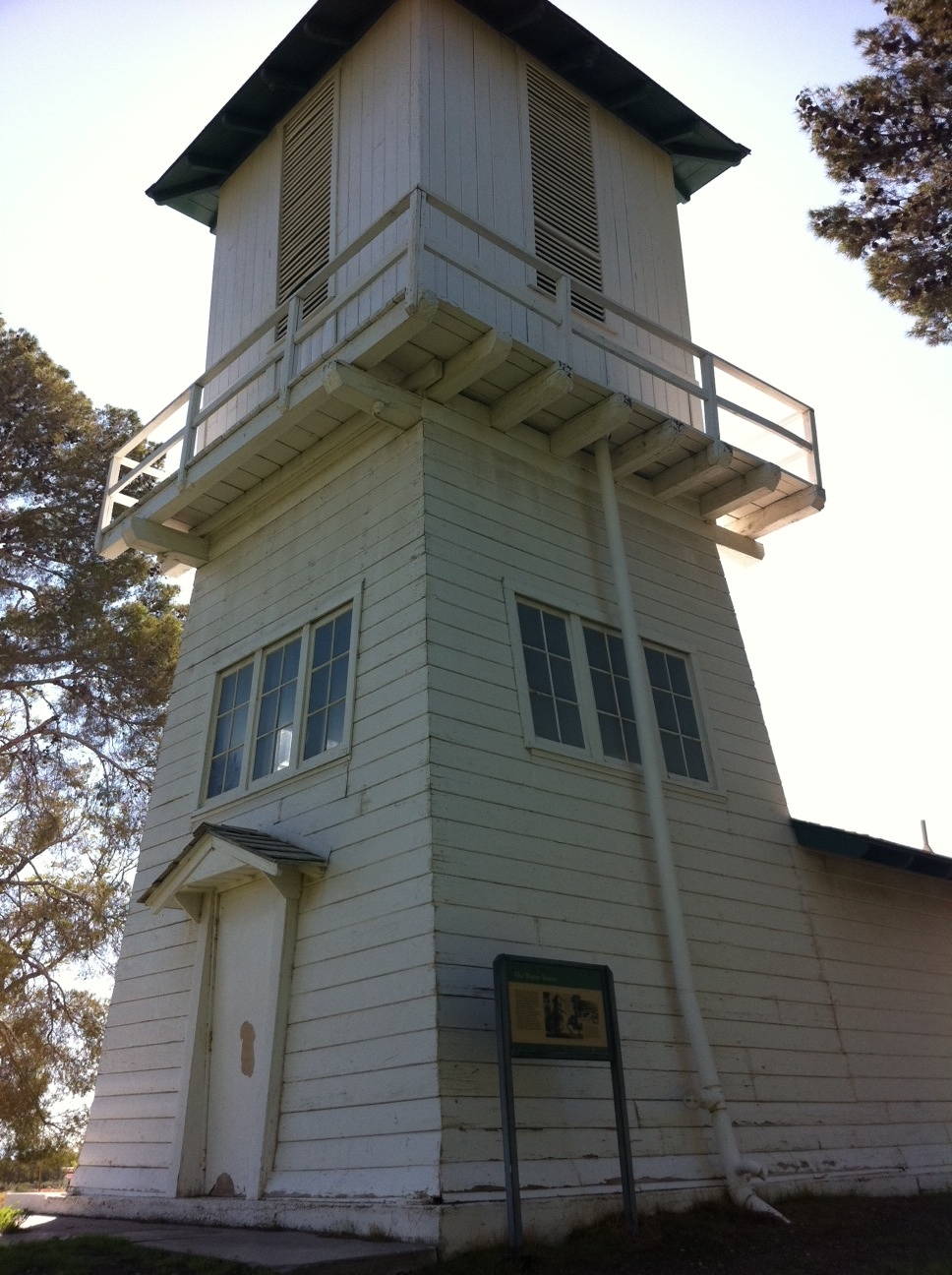
- Water tower at Tule Springs Ranch

- Location within Nevada Location within the United States
- Location: 9200 Tule Springs Road; Las Vegas, Nevada
- Coordinates: 36°19′11″N 115°16′05″W
- Architect: Prosper Goumond
- Architectural style: Colonial Revival
- NRHP reference No.: 81000383
- Added to NRHP: September 23, 1981

Tule Springs Ranch and the remaining buildings are listed as a district on the United States National Register of Historic Places in Las Vegas, Nevada. Part of the area is included in the Tule Springs Archaeological Site and is listed on the U.S. National Register of Historic Places. The building are part of the Floyd Lamb Park at Tule Springs which is operated by the City of Las Vegas. Located about 20 miles from the Strip off U.S. Highway 95 north.

== History ==
The ranch district was listed on the National Register of Historic Places on September 23, 1981.

The first establishment at Tule Springs may have been the U.S. Hotel owned by a Mr. Levandowski (ca. 1905). In 1916 a Mormon settler, Bert Nay, filed for water rights on the site. Nay sold the ranch to Gilbert Hefner in 1928, who owned the property until 1941 when he sold it to Sheriff Gene Ward, who in turn sold it to Prosper Jacob Goumond. Most of the buildings on the ranch date from the 1940s, when Goumond was developing the Tule Springs Ranch into a "divorce ranch."
