= Lone Mountain, Las Vegas =

Unincorporated community in Nevada, US

Lone Mountain
- Neighborhood
- Lone mountain and the Las Vegas Beltway in 2026.

- Location within Nevada
- Coordinates: 36°14′18″N 115°18′59″W
- Country: United States
- State: Nevada
- County: Clark
- City: Las Vegas

Lone Mountain is a neighborhood and hill in Las Vegas, Nevada.

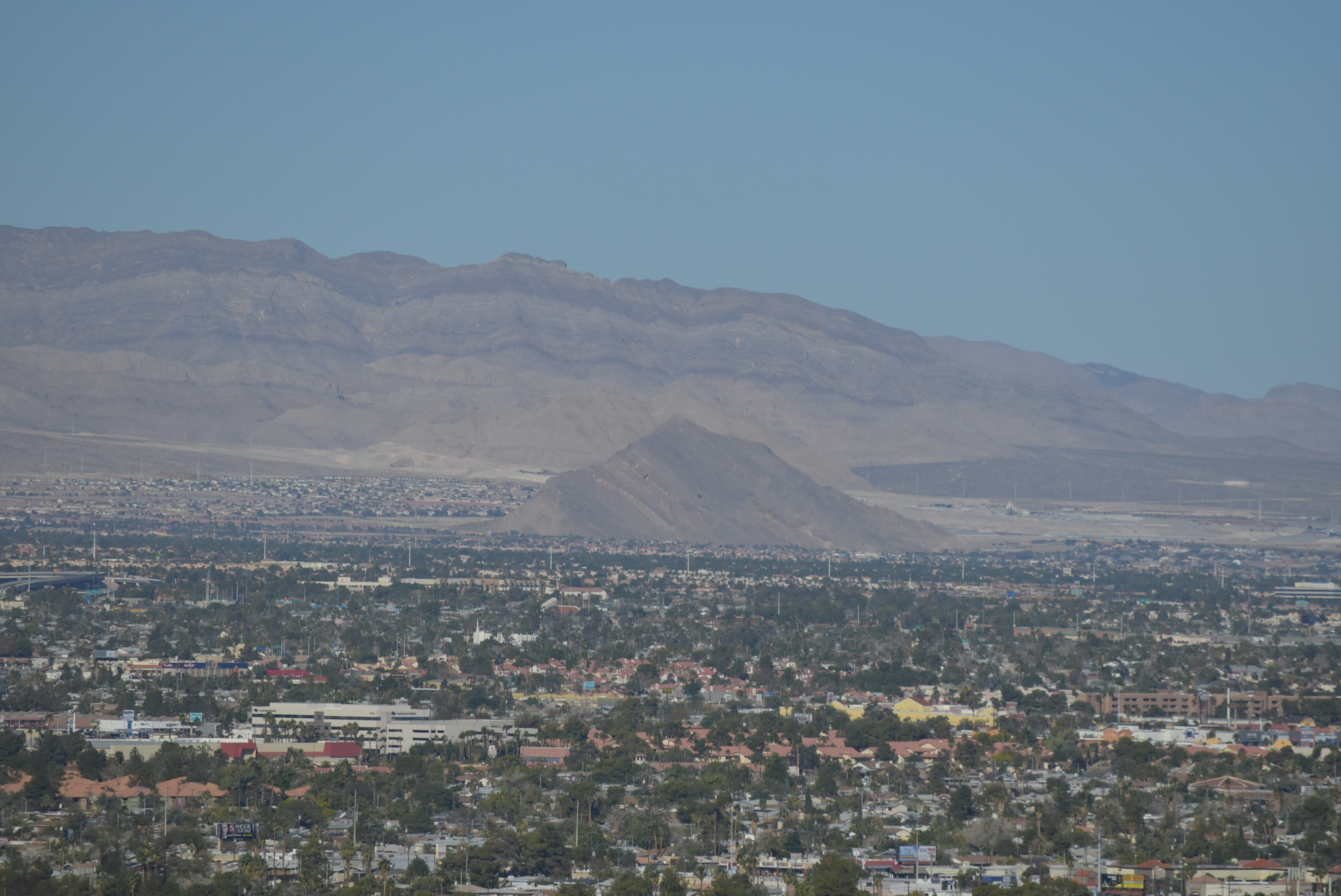
Lone Mountain and the surrounding neighborhood.

The area was named after a solitary hill that is detached from the Red Rock National Conservation Area, known as "Lone Mountain," which is an isolated, rocky butte northwest of central Las Vegas. The summit stands 560 ft (170 m) above the surrounding area and from which visitors can observe the nearby Spring Mountains, and Mount Charleston. Lone Mountain itself is encircled by a 10-foot-wide (3.0 m), 3.2-mile (5.1 km) perimeter trail for joggers, hikers, and horseback riders.

It is the neighboring community immediately north of Summerlin and roughly bordered on the west by the Red Rock Canyon National Conservation Area, on the south by Cheyenne Avenue, on the east by I-11/U.S. 95, and on the north by West Lone Mountain Road. While there is a proliferation of new construction at the western foothills, there are still a number of horse ranches and natural terrain and parks which remain.

The Las Vegas Metropolitan Police Department academy is located in the neighborhood. The area is also the location of the Police Memorial Park. The park includes a memorial dedicated to Southern Nevada law enforcement officers killed in the line of duty as well as officers of the New York City Police Department who died as a result of the September 11, 2001 attacks.

Prominent recreational areas within the area include Lone Mountain Discovery Park (a green space with a roller hockey rink, basketball, tennis courts, and a picnic area), Majestic Park (a full-service softball facility with twelve playing fields), and Trigono Hills Park (a $6.5 million recreational facility, which opened in the spring of 2020.

On October 2, 2022, the Church of Jesus Christ of Latter-day Saints announced its intention to build a temple on a 20.0-acre (8.1 ha) site between North Grand Canyon Drive and Tee Pee Lane. On May 15, 2024, the Las Vegas City Planning Commission voted unanimously (6-0, with 1 abstention) to recommend plans for the proposed temple at a meeting where thousands turned out in favor of the temple. Thereafter, on July 17, 2024, the Las Vegas City Council voted unanimously (7-0) to approve the building of the temple. A legal challenge to the temple project was dismissed by the Nevada Supreme Court in September 2026. Although no exact construction timeline was announced, it is hoped to be completed in 2029.
