= Floyd Lamb Park at Tule Springs =

City park in Las Vegas, Nevada

Coordinates: 36.323917°N 115.26603°W

- View of Tule Springs Lake looking north
- Interactive map of Floyd Lamb Park at Tule Springs
- Location: Las Vegas, Nevada
- Area: 830 ha (2,100 acres)
- Designated: 1964

Floyd Lamb Park at Tule Springs is a 2,040-acre (830 ha) park in Las Vegas, Nevada. The park is centered on Tule Springs, a series of small natural spring-fed lakes that form an oasis in this part of the Mojave Desert. One of the larger urban retreats in the Las Vegas Valley, Tule Springs was once considered to be far out of town but is now encroached by development. The park includes the Tule Springs Ranch, Tule Springs Archaeological Site, Tule Springs Wash and four ponds available for fishing.

== History ==
Tule Springs was first designated as a park when it was acquired by the city of Las Vegas in 1964. It was renamed Floyd Lamb State Park in 1977 when the state assumed control. The park was named after Nevada state senator Floyd Lamb, who was later convicted of taking a $23,000 bribe from an undercover FBI agent in 1983.

The city took control of the park for a second time when the legislature and state in 2005 agreed to release control and ownership of Floyd Lamb State Park to the City of Las Vegas. The park was transferred to the city on July 2, 2007, and renamed to Floyd Lamb Park at Tule Springs. In addition to the park, the city received control of 1,300 acres (5 km^{2}) of Bureau of Land Management land. It was placed on the National Register of Historic Places in 1981 and later on placed on the Las Vegas Register of Historic Places in 2008.

== Ponds ==
There are four public ponds at the park that are stocked for fishing. Tule Springs Lake is the largest of these lakes, followed by Mulberry Lake, Cottonwood Lake, and Desert Willow Lake. In addition to abundant fishing, the lake area is home to a diverse population of ducks, herons, and peacocks.
