= Tule Springs =

Landform in Nevada, USS

Coordinates: 36.323917°N 115.26603°W

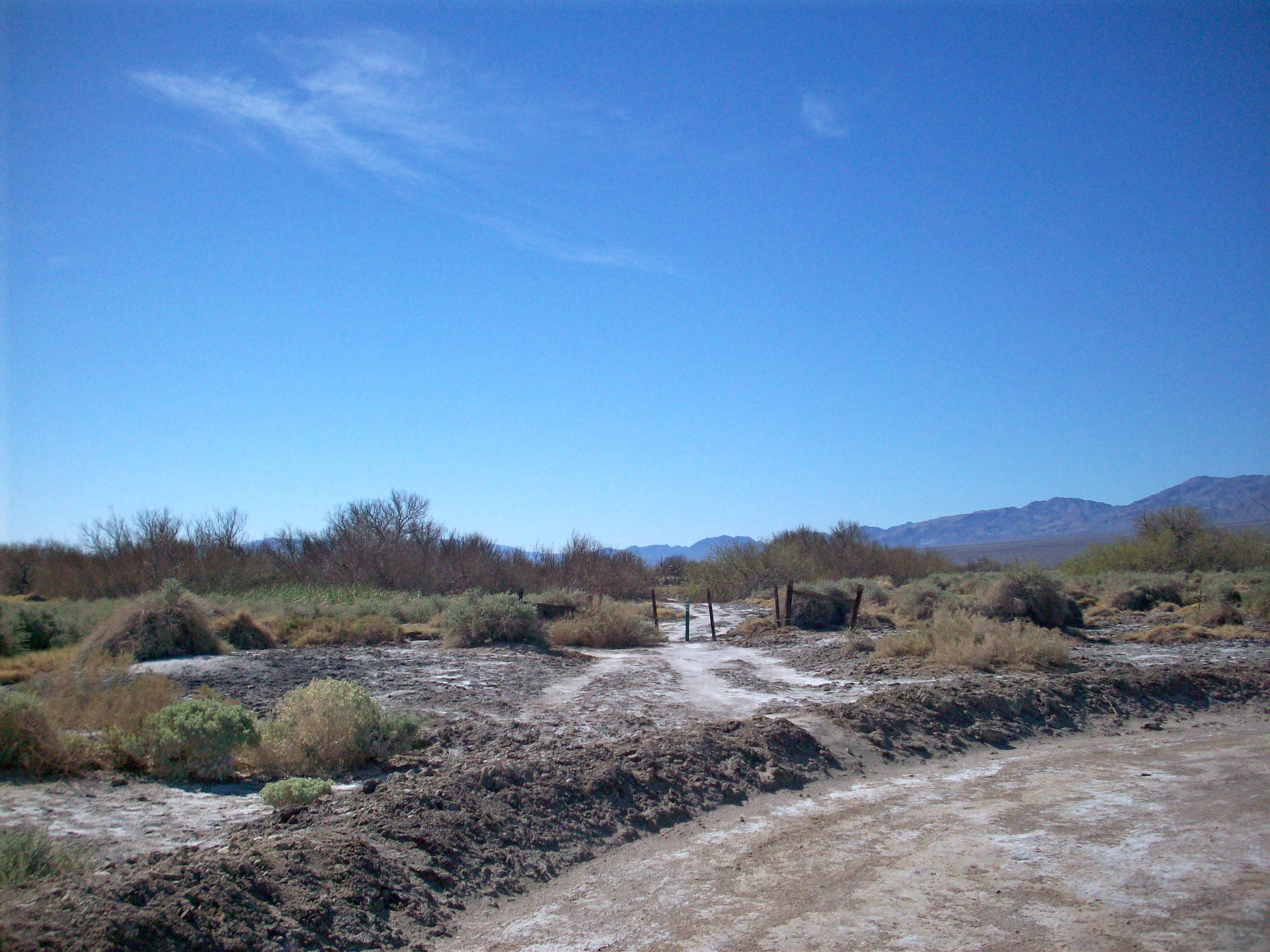
Tule Springs, Nevada

Tule Springs is one of the larger urban retreats in Las Vegas, Nevada, and the Las Vegas Valley. It is a significant desert ecosystem consisting of a series of small lakes that formed an oasis in this area of the Mojave Desert. Both the springs and the ranch are located within the Floyd Lamb Park at Tule Springs which is operated by the City of Las Vegas.

== Tule Springs Ranch ==
Tule Springs Ranch and the associated buildings are listed as a district on the United States National Register of Historic Places and located within this area. The ranch district was listed on the National Register of Historic Places on September 23, 1981.

== Tule Springs Archaeological Site ==
The area was home to numerous Native American visitors in the pre-Columbian period. More recently, it served as a guest ranch for out-of-state residents seeking to "live" in Nevada and gain access to its easy divorce requirements. Several of the ranch's buildings remain, as do a few peacocks.

The springs archeological site was listed on the National Register of Historic Places on April 20, 1979.

== Tule Springs Wash ==
The wash, also known as the Upper Las Vegas Wash feeds into the Las Vegas Wash. The wash area also includes several patches of the rare Las Vegas bear poppy.

This area is part of Ice Age Fossils State Park, a 23,000-acre (9,300 ha) conservation area, and Tule Springs Fossil Beds National Monument, established in 2014.
