= Summerlin Hospital =

Summerlin Hospital Medical Center
- Universal Health Services; Valley Health System
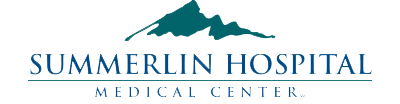

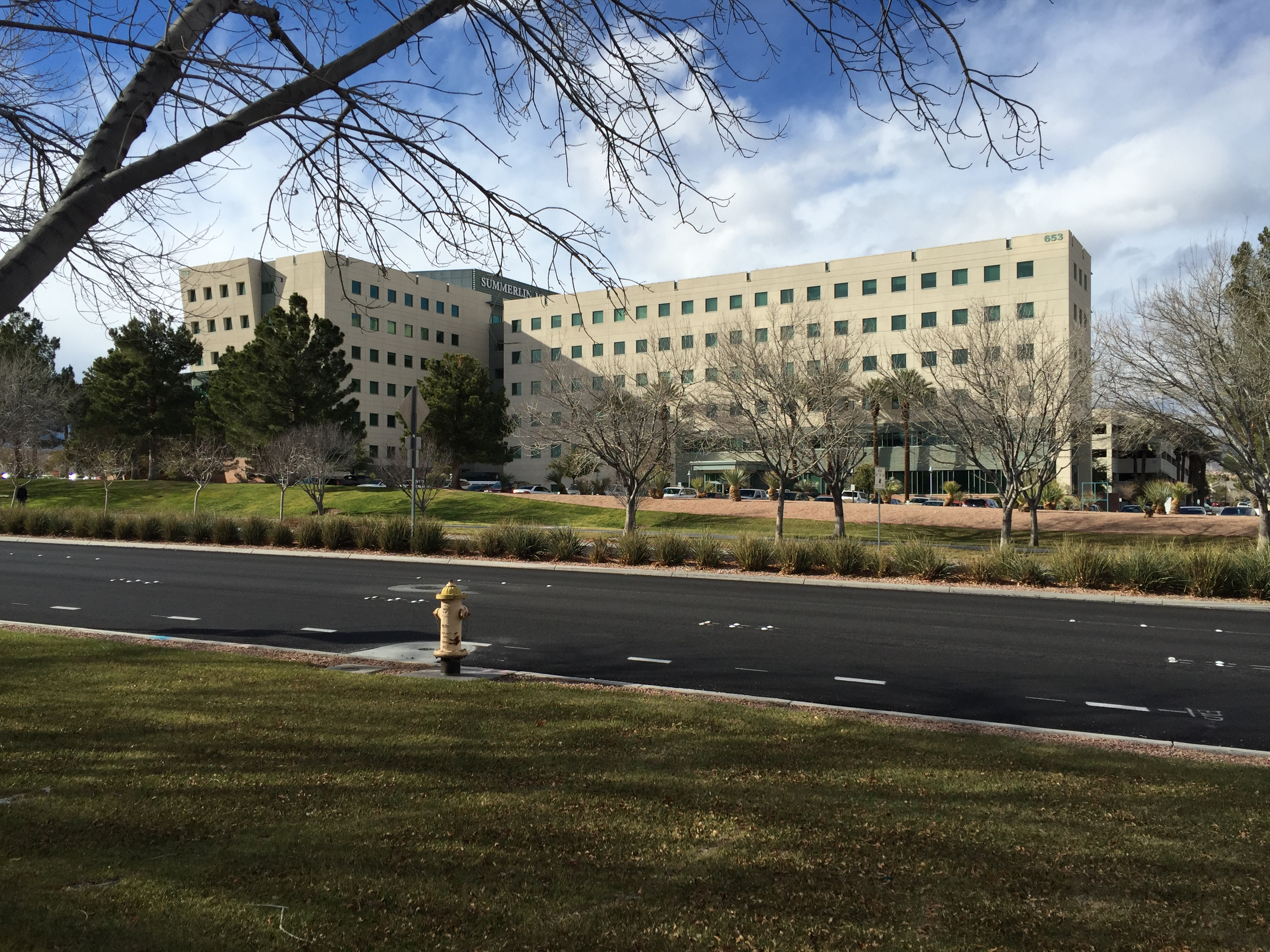
- Summerlin Hospital, viewed from Town Center Drive

Geography
- Location: 657 North Town Center Drive; Summerlin, Clark County, Nevada, United States
- Coordinates: 36°10′51″N 115°19′05″W

Organization
- Care system: Private
- Type: Community
- Affiliated university: None
- Network: Universal Health Services; Valley Health System

Services
- Standards: Joint Commission
- Emergency department: Yes
- Beds: 485

Helipads
- Helipad: FAA LID: 0NV1

History
- Founded: October 16, 1997; 28 years ago

Links
- Website: summerlinhospital.com
- Lists: Hospitals in Nevada

The Summerlin Hospital Medical Center is a private, for-profit hospital owned by Universal Health Services and operated by the Valley Health System. It is located in the Summerlin neighborhood of Las Vegas, Nevada.

As of 2018, the Summerlin Hospital offers 485 beds with private rooms. It is an accredited Chest Pain Center and Primary Stroke Center. The 40-acre (16 ha) campus also includes two medical office towers that provide a variety of outpatient services.

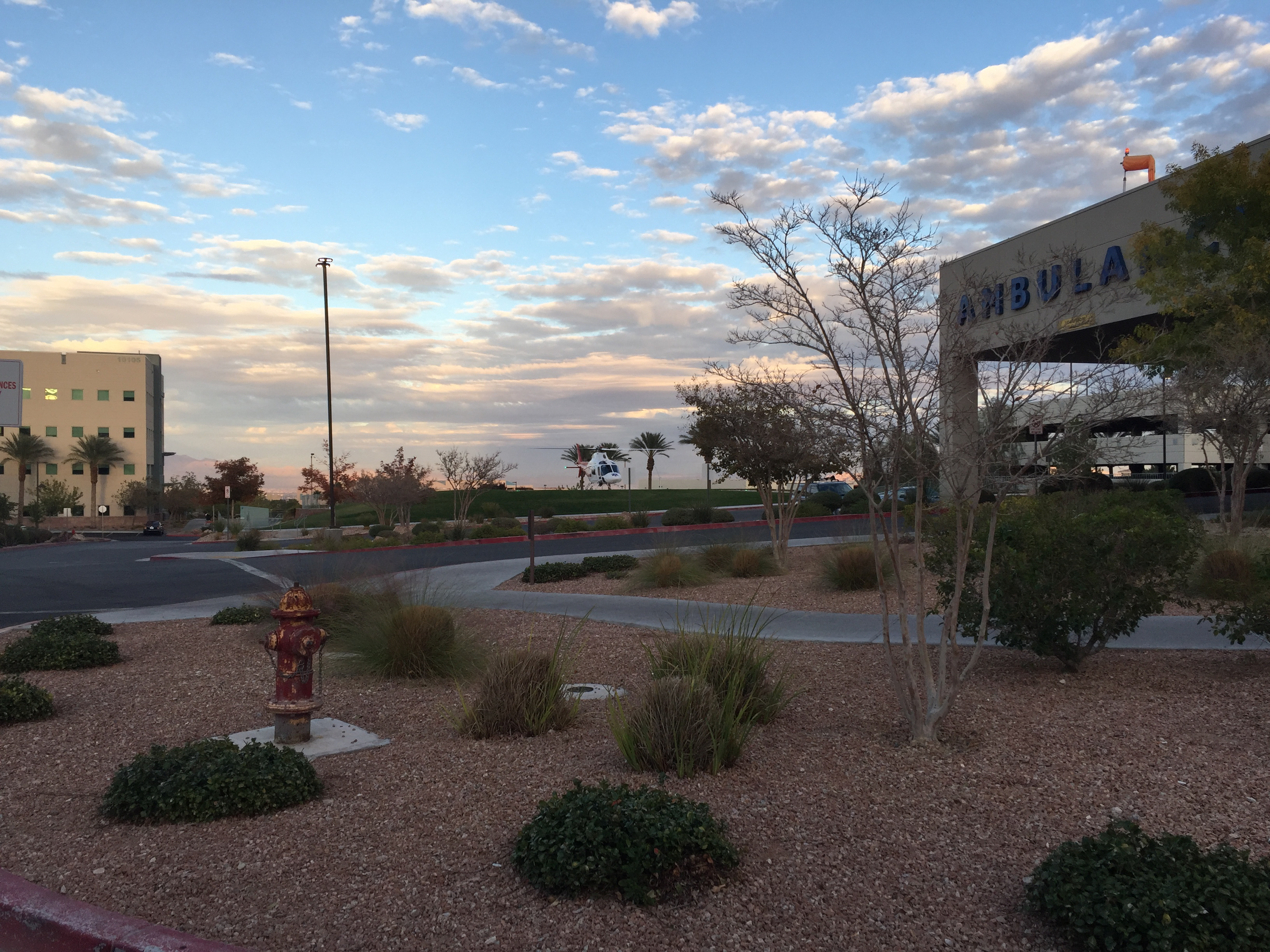
An air ambulance preparing to depart the hospital in November 2016

== History ==
The Summerlin Hospital Medical Center opened on October 16, 1997. With an initial investment of $80 million, the brand new hospital would include 148 beds, all located in private rooms, and would offer Southern Nevada's first and only hospital-based cancer treatment facility.

=== Timeline ===
- October 1997: Summerlin Hospital Medical Center opens with 148 beds. Vacant space was included in the hospital's design for future expansion.
- December 1999: A new wing for the hospital's intensive care unit opens, as a part of a $1.5 million expansion. The need to expand the hospital came three years earlier than initially expected.
- June 2005: A four-bed pediatric emergency department opens.
- 2006: Construction begins on a five-story parking garage.
- March 2007: A $100 million expansion is announced due to high demand. The parking garage, part of the expansion, opens a month later.
- May 2008: A new emergency room opens as part of the second phase of the expansion project.
- June 25, 2008: The hospital breaks ground on the third and final phase of its expansion project. The final phase consists of a six-story patient facility, adding 180 rooms for a new total of 480. A new medical office building, located near the property's northeast corner, was also under development, with a scheduled opening in fall 2008.
- December 2009: Completion of the expansion project, which includes an expanded hospital with over 480 beds, an expanded Emergency Department, an expanded Labor and Delivery unit, a brand new Level III Neonatal Intensive Care Unit, a second medical office building, and a new parking garage.

== Services ==
The Summerlin Hospital Medical Center offers a comprehensive range of health care services, including:

- The Advanced Primary Stroke Center
- The Breast Care Center
- The Cancer Center
- CentRx Pharmacy
- The Children's Medical Center
  - Neonatal Intensive Care Unit
  - Pediatric Intensive Care Unit
  - Pediatric Emergency Room
  - Pediatric Therapy Center
- Ear, Nose and Throat
- Emergency Medicine
- Gastroenterology
- The Heart Center
  - Advanced Electrophysiology Lab
  - The Chest Pain Center
  - The Open Heart Program
- Maternity
  - The Birthplace at Summerlin Hospital
- Orthopedics
- Outpatient Services
- Palliative Care
- Radiology
- Rehabilitation
- Respiratory Therapy
- The Sleep Study Center
- Social Services
- Surgery
  - The Robotic Surgery Institute
- The Women's Health Center
- Wound Care

== Heliport ==
- Summerlin Medical Center Heliport – FAA LID: 0NV1, 40 ft × 40 ft (12 m × 12 m), helipad built with bituminous concrete.
