= North Vista Hospital =

- Prime Healthcare Services

Geography
- Location: 1409 East Lake Mead Boulevard; North Las Vegas, Clark County, Nevada, United States
- Coordinates: 36.19487°N 115.12262°W

Organization
- Care system: Private
- Type: Community
- Affiliated university: None
- Network: Prime Healthcare Services

Services
- Standards: Joint Commission
- Emergency department: Yes
- Beds: 217

Helipads
- Helipad: Yes

History
- Founded: 1959; 67 years ago

Links
- Website: northvistahospital.com
- Lists: Hospitals in Nevada

North Vista Hospital is a for-profit hospital owned and operated by Prime Healthcare Services and is the only full-service acute care hospital in North Las Vegas, Nevada. The hospital provides 217 beds.

== History ==
The hospital opened in 1959 as North Las Vegas Hospital with 33 beds. It was later renamed Community Hospital and Lake Mead Hospital Medical Center and has undergone several expansions, including construction of the west tower and Women's Plaza complex in the mid 1990s.

In 2014, its former owner IASIS Healthcare sold it to Prime Healthcare Services.
