= Alpha Hospital Group =

English mental health care provider

- Industry: Mental health
- Founded: 2002
- Founder: Patricia Hodgkinson
- Headquarters: England

Alpha Hospital Group is a private provider of mental health care in England, launched in 2002 by Patricia Hodgkinson, former chief executive of the Florence Nightingale Hospitals Group.

Khalid Hameed, Baron Hameed is chairman of the company. It has 3 low to medium secure mental health facilities in Bury, Sheffield and Woking with more than 300 beds in total and employs more than 1,000 staff. In August 2015 the company was bought by Cygnet Health Care for £95 million.

It was alleged by The Daily Telegraph that Sudhir Choudhrie, one of the biggest donors to the Liberal Democrats was denied a peerage because of concerns about the treatment of patients by the group. Choudhrie owned C&C Alpha Group, which owned both the Alpha Hospital Group and Alpha Care Homes. The Care Quality Commission inspected the hospital in Woking in February 2013 and found it had failed eight of the nine “essential standards”. In 2011 the hospital in Sheffield was said not to have sufficient numbers of the right staff. The company responded by saying "Sudhir Choudhrie does not run or manage Alpha Healthcare or Alpha Hospitals. He retired from being a director of both companies in 2007".

The C&C Alpha Group business had a turnover of £89 million in the year to April 2013 and employed more than 1,300 staff. In July 2014 the Guardian published a correction, saying there was no evidence to suggest that his peerage was blocked because concerns about Alpha. The Morning Star described the company in January 2014 as representing "some of the worst of NHS privatisation", and pointing out that "all three of Alpha's private mental health hospitals that were inspected by the Care Quality Commission in 2013 failed to meet some standards."

The Care Quality Commission made unannounced visits in November and December 2013 to the hospital in Woking found it was failing to meet five out of the six national standards of quality and safety and issued formal warnings in respect of three of them – care and welfare of people, safeguarding people from abuse, and records as they had already been told that they needed to make a number of improvements during two previous visits.

The company takes NHS patients from across England at a cost of up to £1,150 a day. 21 patients from Yorkshire were placed in the Bury hospital between April 2013 and March 2015.

The Care Quality Commission inspected the hospital in Bury in February 2015. It found that the seclusion rooms, where patients are calmed or restrained, were dirty and not equipped with adequate washing facilities or natural light. Alpha Hospital Group was acquired in 2015 by Cygnet Health Care, owned by Universal Health Services, a Pennsylvania-based hospital management company.

== See also ==
- Mental health in the United Kingdom
