= Iasis Healthcare =

Hospital Group in Franklin, US

IASIS Healthcare
- Type: LLC
- Industry: Health care
- Founded: 1998
- Headquarters: Franklin, TN, United States
- Number of locations: 18
- Key people: W. Carl Whitmer (CEO)
- Revenue: ▲US$3.3 billion (2017)
- Owner: TPG Capital
- Number of employees: 13, 700 (2017)
- Website: http://www.iasishealthcare.com

IASIS Healthcare, located in Franklin, Tennessee, was the for-profit owner and operator of medium-sized acute care hospitals in high-growth urban and suburban markets. IASIS owns or leases 17 acute care hospital facilities and one behavioral health hospital facility with a total of 3,581 licensed beds and has total annual net revenue of approximately $3.2 billion. These hospital facilities are located in five regions: Salt Lake City, Utah; Phoenix, Arizona; five cities in Texas, including Houston and San Antonio; West Monroe, Louisiana; and Woodland Park, Colorado. IASIS also owns and operates Health Choice Arizona, a Medicaid and Medicare managed health plan in Phoenix that serves more than 197,000 members. IASIS Healthcare, its assets and employees have since merged with Steward Health Care System of Florida, the largest private operator of hospitals in the nation. The deal was estimated to be worth $2 billion.

== Company Background ==
Founded in 1998, IASIS Healthcare is an owner and operator of community-focused hospitals in high-growth markets. IASIS Healthcare began principal operations in October 1999, in transactions arranged by the management team and Joseph Littlejohn & Levy. In 2004, Texas Pacific Group, a private equity firm managing over $13 billion in assets, led a group of investors to acquire IASIS. In February 2015, it filed for an initial public offering.

== IASIS Healthcare Foundation ==
The IASIS Healthcare Foundation is a charitable organization that was created in an effort to provide healthcare services, supplies and training to disadvantaged regions around the world. The Foundation's first mission was a trip to the Serengeti Region in the east African nation of Tanzania. Since then, the foundation has provided aid to Haiti after the devastating earthquake as well as the Democratic Republic of the Congo.

== Hospitals ==
Hospital	City	State	Acquired/Divested	Acquired from/Divested to	Beds
Davis Hospital and Medical Center	Layton	Utah	1998	Paracelsus Healthcare Corp	220
Jordan Valley Medical Center	West Jordan	Utah	1998	Paracelsus Healthcare Corp	172
Jordan Valley Medical Center- West Valley	West Valley City	Utah	1998	Paracelsus Healthcare Corp	102
Mountain Point Medical Center	Lehi	Utah	Opened June 2015	Newly constructed campus of Jordan Valley Medical Center	40
Salt Lake Regional Medical Center	Salt Lake City	Utah	1998	Paracelsus Healthcare Corp	158
Mountain Vista Medical Center	Mesa	Arizona	1999	Tenet Healthcare	178
St. Luke's Medical Center	Phoenix	Arizona	1999	Tenet Healthcare	200
St. Luke's Behavioral Health Center	Phoenix	Arizona	1999	Tenet Healthcare	124
Tempe St. Luke's Hospital	Tempe	Arizona	1999	Tenet Healthcare	87
Odessa Regional Medical Center	Odessa	Texas	1999	Tenet Healthcare	225
Southwest General Hospital	San Antonio	Texas	1999	Tenet Healthcare	327
St. Joseph Medical Center	Houston	Texas	2011	Hospitals Partners of America	790
The Medical Center of Southeast Texas	Port Arthur	Texas	1999	Tenet Healthcare	199
The Medical Center of Southeast Texas—Victory Campus	Beaumont	Texas	2015	physicians group	17
Wadley Regional Medical Center	Texarkana	Texas	2010	Brim Holdings	370
Glenwood Regional Medical Center	West Monroe	Louisiana	2006	Hospital Service District	278
Wadley Regional Medical Center at Hope	Hope	Arkansas	2010	James Cheek	79
Pikes Peak Regional Medical Center	Woodland Park	Colorado	2010	Brim Holdings	15
Pikes Peak Regional Medical Center	Woodland Park	Colorado	2010	Brim Holdings	15
Palms of Pasadena Hospital	St. Petersburg	Florida	1999/2013	Tenet Healthcare/Hospital Corporation of America	307
Memorial Hospital of Tampa	Tampa	Florida	1999/2013	Tenet Healthcare/Hospital Corporation of America	183
Town and Country Hospital	Tampa	Florida	1999/2013	Tenet Healthcare/Hospital Corporation of America	201
North Vista Hospital	Las Vegas	Nevada	1999/2014	Tenet Healthcare/Prime Healthcare Services	177

== See also ==
- Articles about hospitals currently or formerly owned by IASIS Healthcare:
  - St. Joseph Medical Center (Houston, Texas)
  - Jordan Valley Medical Center West Valley Campus (West Valley City, Utah)
  - Salt Lake Regional Medical Center
  - North Vista Hospital (North Las Vegas, Nevada)
- List of hospitals in Arizona
- List of hospitals in Colorado
- List of hospitals in Florida
- List of hospitals in Louisiana
- List of hospitals in Nevada
- List of hospitals in Texas
- List of hospitals in Utah
