= Dodgeville =

Dodgeville may refer to:

- Dodgeville, Iowa
- Dodgeville, Michigan
- Dodgeville, Wisconsin, a city
- Dodgeville (town), Wisconsin, a town adjacent to the city
- Dodgeville, a village in Attleboro, Massachusetts
  - Dodgeville Mill
