= MountainView Hospital, Las Vegas =

MountainView Hospital & Medical Center
- Hospital Corporation of America; Sunrise Healthcare System

Geography
- Location: 3100 North Tenaya Way; Las Vegas, Nevada, United States
- Coordinates: 36°12′55″N 115°14′56″W

Organization
- Care system: Private
- Type: General and Teaching
- Network: Hospital Corporation of America; Sunrise Healthcare System

Services
- Standards: Joint Commission
- Emergency department: Level III trauma center
- Beds: 489

Helipads
- Helipad: Yes

History
- Founded: February 1996; 30 years ago

Links
- Website: https://mountainview-hospital.com/
- Lists: Hospitals in Nevada

MountainView Hospital & Medical Center is a for-profit hospital owned by the Hospital Corporation of America, and operated by Sunrise Healthcare System. The 489-bed hospital is located in Las Vegas, Nevada, United States.

== History ==
The hospital opened in February 1996 with 155 beds.

In January 2013, the hospital expanded and opened a three-story tower and the first phase of its new Emergency Department.

In July 2013, the second phase of MountainView's Emergency Department opened, and it now has 81 private ER beds.

In October 2013, MountainView Hospital opened the second phase of its Inpatient Rehabilitation Unit, and the rehab unit now has 35 private beds.

== Awards and recognitions ==
- Joint Commission Accredited Institution
- Joint Commission Certified Primary Stroke Center
- Joint Commission Top Performer on Key Quality Measures
- American Stroke Association's "Get with the Guidelines" Gold Performance Achievement Award
- Accredited Chest Pain Center
- Bariatric Center of Excellence
- NICHE designation for commitment to elder care excellence

=== Nurses unionize ===
In early 2009, registered nurses were faced with patient care concerns and under staffing at a hospital that nearly lost its certification with the United States Department of Health and Human Services due to issues of infection control and contamination of equipment. Nurses began organizing with the California Nurses Association/National Nurses Organizing Committee (CNA/NNOC), and in June 2009, about 30 nurses and union staff attempted to meet with hospital CEO William Wagnon to discuss these issues of public safety and nursing standards. All but two were escorted out of the hospital by security, including nurses on break. Nurses filed for a secret-ballot union election two days later.

A week before the scheduled union election that July, nurses filed charges against the hospital with the National Labor Relations Board (NLRB). The NLRB found sufficient evidence to conduct a two-month-long investigation of "massive illegal conduct" that included "surveillance, interrogation, bribery, threats", and more. Faced with federal prosecution, a settlement with the NLRB was reached in which HCA agreed to end the illegal practices.

On January 14, 2010, Mountain View Hospital nurses elected to unionize in a vote of 240 to 152 (approximately 95% participation). Since the merging of CNA/NNOC, the United American Nurses, and the Massachusetts Nurses Association in December 2009, MountainView Hospital is the first hospital in the country to be newly organized under the banner of National Nurses United.
