= Valley Hospital Medical Center =

- Universal Health Services; Valley Health System
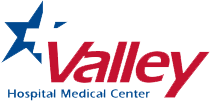

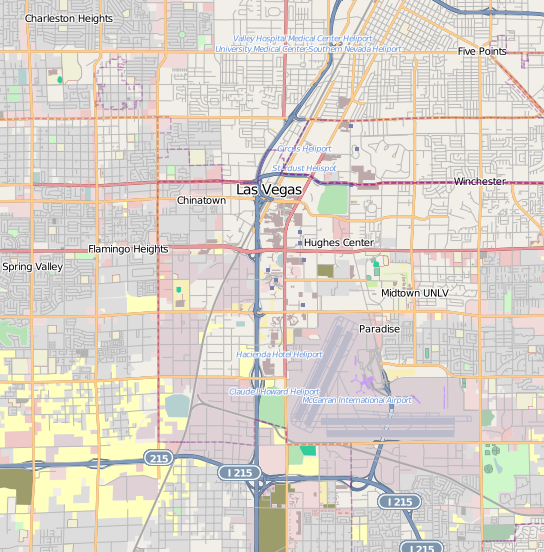
- Location in Las Vegas Valley Hospital Medical Center (Las Vegas Boulevard) Valley Hospital Medical Center (Nevada)

Geography
- Location: 620 Shadow Lane; Las Vegas, Clark County, Nevada, United States
- Coordinates: 36.163056°N 115.166111°W

Organization
- Care system: Private
- Type: General and Teaching
- Affiliated university: Touro University Nevada (2004–present)
- Network: Universal Health Services; Valley Health System

Services
- Standards: Joint Commission
- Emergency department: Yes
- Beds: 409

Helipads
- Helipad: FAA LID: NV53

History
- Founded: 1972; 54 years ago

Links
- Website: valleyhospital.net
- Lists: Hospitals in Nevada

Valley Hospital Medical Center is a for-profit hospital owned by Universal Health Services and operated by Valley Health System. It is one of six hospitals within the Valley Health System in Las Vegas, Nevada. It is accredited by the Joint Commission and includes a certified Primary Stroke Center, an accredited Chest Pain Center and a certified Heart Failure Center.

== History ==
The hospital, founded in 1972, established Southern Nevada's first air ambulance service, Flight for Life, which was owned by Metro Aviation, in 1980. On December 4, 2001, Valley Hospital ended its contract with Metro Aviation, shutting down the Flight for Life air ambulance service and retiring the helipad. Valley Hospital completed a new helipad next to the emergency department with a grassy area in 2007.

Valley's Emergency Critical Care Center increased the number of beds from 28 to 42 on March 11, 2004. This project was completed when 11 urgent care beds were added to the center in June.

The hospital no longer has labor and delivery, NICU, nursery or gynecology units as of 2014. This area of the hospital was re-purposed to become a Behavioral Health Unit.

== Services ==
- Chest Pain Center
- Behavior Health Unit
- Medical/Surgical floors (with telemetry)
- Critical Care
- Stroke Center
- Emergency Department
- Surgical and Endoscopic Care (and recovery unit)
- Acute Rehabilitation
- Diabetes Education and Counseling

=== Advanced Cardiovascular Service ===
- Open heart surgery
- Balloon angioplasty
- Cardiac catheterizations and stenting
- Peripheral vascular studies

=== Neurological Services ===
- Coiling for brain aneurysms
- Neurosurgery
- Stroke care

== Helipad ==
Valley Hospital Medical Center Helipad
- IATA: none; ICAO: none; FAA LID: NV53

Summary
- Airport type: Helipad
- Operator: Valley Hospital Medical Center
- Location: Las Vegas, Nevada, U.S.
- Elevation AMSL: 2,055 ft / 626 m
- Coordinates: 36°09′47″N 115°09′56″W
- Interactive map of Valley Hospital Medical Center Helipad

Helipads
Number	Length		Surface
Number	ft	m	Surface
H1	54 × 48	16 × 15	Concrete
H2	60 × 60	18 × 18	Concrete
- Sources: Airnav.com

From 1980 to 2001, the helipad was located on top of the hospital, adjacent to the lobby. After "Flight for Life" was sold to "Mercy Air Services" in 2001, the hospital created a landing zone just south of the emergency entrance in a dirt lot for Mercy Air's bigger helicopters. In 2007, the hospital refurbished an old parking lot into a grassy area, complete with a new helipad right in front of the emergency entrance.
