= South Texas Health System Heart =

Coordinates: 26.1839°N 98.2182°W

McAllen Heart Hospital

Geography
- Location: 1900 South D Street, McAllen, TX, United States

Services
- Emergency department: Level IV trauma center
- Beds: 60

History
- Opened: 1996

Links
- Website: www.southtexashealthsystemheart.com
- Lists: Hospitals in the United States

McAllen Heart Hospital is a 60-bed cardiovascular disease hospital in McAllen, Texas. It was the freestanding heart hospital in the United States

The hospital provides comprehensive inpatient and outpatient cardiac care, a 24-hour Emergency Center, General and Weight Loss Surgery programs. It serves McAllen and the surrounding communities in The Rio Grande Valley.

== Emergency medicine ==
The McAllen Heart hospital has advanced imaging technology, such as the Optical Coherence Tomography. It also has an outpatient congestive heart failure program .

== Affiliation ==
McAllen Heart Hospital is owned and operated by a subsidiary of Universal Health Services, Inc..

== Awards and Accolades ==
- Received full Cycle II Chest Pain Center Accreditation with PCI (Percutaneous Coronary Interventions) from the Society of Chest Pain Centers Accreditation Review Committee in March 2009.
- Certified as a disease specific care Primary Stroke Center and certified as a Center of Excellence for Bariatric Surgery.
