= Fuller Hospital =

Behavioral health hospital in Massachusetts

- Universal Health Services

Geography
- Location: South Attleboro, Attleboro, Massachusetts, United States
- Coordinates: 41.924°N 71.360°W

Organization
- Care system: Private
- Type: Specialist

Services
- Emergency department: No
- Beds: 109
- Speciality: Behavioral Health

History
- Former name: Fuller Memorial Sanitarium
- Opened: 1937

Links
- Website: fullerhospital.com
- Lists: Hospitals in Massachusetts

Fuller Hospital (also known by its former name, Arbour-Fuller) is a 109-bed behavioral health hospital located in South Attleboro, Massachusetts. The hospital is owned by Universal Health Services.

Today, the hospital provides inpatient and outpatient mental health and substance abuse services to both pediatric and adult patients.

== History ==
Fuller Hospital opened in 1937 as the Fuller Memorial Sanitarium, founded by the Seventh-day Adventist Layman's Benevolent Association of New England through a donation by the estate of George and Mary Fuller. Beginning with an existing building on 21 acres of land, the hospital opened with twelve beds and reported income of $12,000 at the end of its first full year. Early on, Fuller Hospital provided nurse training, which they cited as a factor in the hospital's ability to operate through the nursing shortage caused by World War II.

After 10 years of operation, the hospital had admitted 1,200 patients experiencing "neuropsychiatric, convalescent, and medical problems." By 1948, the hospital had grown to 37 beds with 26 full-time employees, and had added a hydrotherapy department and nurses' quarters.

In 1958, another donation from the Fuller Estate allowed for expansion of the campus. The hospital added a new wing to the main building, as well as a parking lot, heating plant, and kitchen.
