= MPYS =

MPYS may refer to:

- Manatee Palms Youth Services, a psychiatric hospital in Bradenton, Florida
- Stimulator of interferon genes, a protein that in humans is encoded by the TMEM173 gene
