= Cambian Group PLC =

Company providing services for SEN children

Cambian Group Holding Limited
- Company type: Private limited company
- Website type: Specialist Educational and Behavioural Health Services
- Headquarters: Metropolitan House, 3 Darkes Lane, Potters Bar, England, EN6 1AG
- Employees: About 4,000
- Parent: CareTech Holdings PLC
- Website: www.cambiangroup.com
- Launched: 2004

Cambian Group Holdings Limited (previously Cambian Group PLC) is a company providing specialist residential and educational services for children and young adults with a range of Special Educational Needs (SEN) and social, emotional and mental health needs (SEMH). Cambian is one of the largest providers of specialist behavioural health and care services for children in the United Kingdom. Its children's services comprise specialist education, specialist residential care, foster care, and specialist mental health services. The company looks after approximately 2,100 children and employs over 4,000 people across a portfolio of 224 residential facilities, specialist schools and fostering offices, located in England and Wales.

Cambian has gained notable and widespread media attention multiple times in the British press for numerous abuse allegations. In 2017 undercover ITV journalists filmed Cambian staff abusing residents including children, which was then broadcast in a television documentary. In 2018 an investigation by Buzzfeed accused Cambian of putting profit above care. In 2020 Ofsted reported that Cambian staff did nothing to help children at their Warrington care home who were sexually exploited by adult men. In 2021 the BBC reported that some children had been locked in their rooms alone for 10 days. Other allegations of abuse at Cambian care homes include an excessive use of restraint against children, and a lack of basic necessities such as soap, toilet paper, food, and adequate furniture.

== History ==
Cambian Group was formed in 2010 with the amalgamation of two operating divisions, Cambian Healthcare (formed 2004) and Cambian Education (formed 2005).

In 2014 Cambian Group merged with Advanced Childcare. The merged company became listed on the London Stock Exchange as Cambian Group plc, and acquired three specialist further education colleges from Mencap (including Dilston College). In December 2014 the group acquired Woodleigh Community Care, a community care provider running 13 residential homes and supported living units and one hospital in Yorkshire.

At the end of 2014 the group ran 23 schools, 35 hospitals, and 188 specialist care homes, in addition to providing day services and organising foster care. It had over 6,000 employees. Analysts noted that changes in Care Quality Commission operations and a revised assessment system for home operators were "creating challenges" for smaller groups in the mental health and learning difficulties care sector, with an increase in mergers and acquisitions. In such an environment it was believed that Cambian would have increased opportunities to selectively expand its operations. in 2017 it had 25 sites with 36 wards and 686 beds.

In December 2016, it sold its adult services business to Cygnet Health Care in a deal worth £377 million, in order to concentrate on children's services.

In 2018, in an acquisition worth £372 million, the company was acquired by CareTech Holdings PLC. On 16 October 2018, the Competition and Markets Authority (CMA) served an initial enforcement order under section 72(2) of the Enterprise Act 2002 on CareTech Holdings PLC and Cambian Group PLC, in relation to the anticipated acquisition. On 8 February 2019, the acquisition was cleared by the CMA.

In 2021 a Cambian school in North Yorkshire was shut down after Ofsted had found that they had failed to protect their children and give them a safe living environment.

== 2017 ITV Television abuse exposé ==
In December 2017, Cambian Group received heavy criticism from British newspapers and healthcare authorities after an ITV exposé of a Cambian Group PLC school. In the resulting fallout, the group's share prices slumped. At the time, Cambian owned 250 schools, hospitals and care homes. Cambian made public promises to change and improve their services. However, currently no significant action has been taken.

In August 2018 Cambian was taken over by CareTech for £372 million.

== 2020 sexual abuse scandal ==
Ofsted reported in 2020 that children in a Warrington care home run by Cambian were sexually exploited by men, but staff did nothing to help them. The regulator, which withheld the home's name and address, issued a notice restricting accommodation, as well as two compliance notices concerning the protection of children, and leadership and management.

== Allegations of filling beds for profit ==
Journalists covering the allegations of abuse and mismanagement at Cambian care homes found that Cambian had cut necessities and crammed children into overcrowded facilities to make higher profits. They also reported that many facilities lacked basic necessities and were cramped, decrepit, and children were forced to share close quarters with violent peers despite Cambian profits soaring since their 2018 takeover by CareTech. Cambian management sent young and vulnerable children to live with older violent teenagers in order to keep care facilities at a high capacity. One former Cambian manager described the competition between private companies such as Cambian as "like a cattle market for children". To meet the allegations, Cambian's chief operating officer Anne Marie Carrie offered to establish an interview with journalists, however she withdrew the offer saying that she "has better things to do tomorrow than assist in a journalistic exercise which is devoid of legitimacy".

Multiple former employees at Cambian accused the company of putting profits over the needs of children, and that they had to fight for even the most basic necessities such as toilet paper and soap, and that managers at monthly meetings grilled them over expenses and constantly pushed for ways to cut costs. Cambian responded to these allegations by labelling the staff as "malcontents", and claimed that toilet paper and other items posed a "safeguarding risk" to children with learning disabilities and autism. The Times journalists also found that Cambian had made increased profits for its shareholders despite many of its homes being rated as the worst in the UK.

== Cambian Education ==
Cambian Education's main focus is to assist young people who have difficulties in accessing learning. They have a variety of special schools and vocational centres along with at-home education for young people with complex difficulties. They help to educate young people who present emotional and behavioural challenges, those with more complex needs including autism, and for young people who have experienced abuse. Ages range between 6–19 years.

== SACCS ==
Sexual Abuse Child Consultancy Services (SACCS) is part of the residential care provision for children. SACCS assists abused children through therapy. One aim of SACCS is to suggest the idea that a lot of children and young people in care today are fostered, but for those who have suffered severe trauma this may be increasing problems and leading to fostering breakdown and multiple moves. They wish to help children come to terms with their experiences by addressing the conflict between the child's chronological and emotional ages and by working at the child's pace. For SACCS, recovery means 'when the child has internalized their attachments and consolidated their emotional development to a point where these can be successfully transferred to other environments and relationships. The child is then deemed to have the potential to achieve full ability in all aspects of their life.'

== Cambian Foster Care ==
Cambian Foster Care is a fostering agency based in Midlands, North West, South West and Yorkshire providing a service for young people who are unable to stay with their birth parents.

== Advanced Childcare Ltd ==
Advanced Childcare Ltd merged with Cambian in 2014. Based in Stockport, it was the largest provider of specialist care and education for children in the UK, with revenues of over £50m. Advanced Childcare had 155 children's homes and 474 beds. The company offered care pathway services ranging from CSE homes, solo homes, complex needs homes, small group homes, group homes to post-16 homes. They also offered therapeutic, residential, fostering and special education services. They aimed to enable Looked After Children to gain the skills and confidence to progress from specialist residential homes to family placements, such as fostering, or independent living.

Advanced Childcare was founded in 1996 by Riz Khan. Formerly owned by Bowmark Capital, it was sold for £28 million to private equity group GI Partners in March 2011. In September 2011 it bought the privately owned Clifford House, which operated 13 children's homes, for £10 million. By May 2012, Advanced Childcare operated 143 children's homes and 15 special schools, employing 1,400 people.
