= Cambian Dilston College =

College in the United Kingdom

Location
- Dilston Hall; Corbridge, Northumberland, NE45 5RJ; England; 54°57′49″N 2°02′25″W

Information
- Type: Special further education
- Established: 1971
- Department for Education URN: 131868 Tables
- Ofsted: Reports
- Principal: Marie Flatman
- Gender: Mixed
- Age: 16 to 25
- Website: http://www.cambiangroup.com/ourservices/service/home/tabid/106/id/161/s/17/xmps/1816/default.aspx

Cambian Dilston College is a private further education college for those with special educational needs. It is located at Dilston Hall in Corbridge in the English county of Northumberland. The remains of Dilston Castle stand in its grounds.

Established in 1971, it was previously known as Mencap National College Dilston and was owned and operated by MENCAP. In June 2014 Mencap sold the college to Cambian Group PLC and the college was renamed Cambian Dilston College.

Today the college provides further education for young people with learning disabilities, autism spectrum conditions and complex needs. The college offers day, short-break and outreach services, and up to 52-week residential placements for students.
