= Charter Behavioral Health Systems =

Former US operator of psychiatric treatment centers and hospitals

- Type: Privately held company
- Industry: Healthcare
- Predecessor: Charter Medical Corporation
- Founded: 1979 in Macon, Georgia
- Defunct: 2000
- Fate: Bankruptcy
- Headquarters: Alpharetta, Georgia, United States
- Area served: United States
- Products: Psychiatric hospitals and treatment centres
- Owner: Crescent Operating

Charter Behavioral Health Systems was an American private company that operated psychiatric treatment centers and hospitals. At one point it was the largest operator of such facilities in the US, but in 2000 it declared bankruptcy and sold many of its facilities to other operators.

While it operated it was based in Alpharetta, Georgia, and had locations in 21 U.S. states.

== History ==
The company was founded in 1979, having evolved from Charter Medical Corporation which was established in 1969. The company grew significantly during the 1980s. In 1992, Charter Medical filed for Chapter 11 bankruptcy due to debt from a 1988 management-led buyout.

After emerging from bankruptcy, the company restructured and rebranded as Magellan Health Services in the mid-1990s. Charter Behavioral Health Systems became a subsidiary during this period, operating numerous psychiatric treatment centers across the United States.

Its television commercials were known for ending with the line, "If you don't get help at Charter, please, get help somewhere."

The company filed for bankruptcy in 2000, at that time it was 90 percent owned by Crescent Operating, Inc.

== Legacy ==
Many of its former facilities, such as Suncoast Behavioral Health Center, continue to operate under new ownership, while the notable Provo Canyon School was shutdown by Utah DHHS in 2026.
