= Little Foundation =

London-based charity

The William Little Foundation
- Founded: 1990
- Founder: Ian Dawson-Shepherd
- Type: Registered charity No. 803551
- Purpose: Understanding the underlying causes of brain disorders, particularly cerebral palsy, and thereby develop means of preventing them
- Location: London, UK
- Region served: International
- Method: Research funding, Public policy, and Education.
- Key people: Lord Hameed, of Hampstead, Chairman
- Website: www.williamlittlefoundation.org

The William Little Foundation is a London-based charity operating internationally.

Named in honour of William Little, the English surgeon who described what became known as 'Little's disease', a spastic paralysis of both lower limbs which then became known as infantile cerebral palsy. The charity, founded in 1990 originally as The Little Foundation by the late Ian Dawson-Shepherd, has as its primary object initiating and funding research into the causes of neurodevelopmental disorders, in particular the causes and prevention of cerebral palsy, the most severe of these disorders which also includes autism, dyslexia, epilepsy, deafness, blindness and learning difficulties. It does this by supporting world-class basic research, hosting multi-disciplinary workshops and conferences, and providing a forum for the exchange of ideas and best practice across all parts of the UK’s cerebral palsy (CP) sector.

On 4 November 2009, Lord Hameed, the charity's president, tabled a motion in the House of Lords asking the Government what measures have been taken to prevent cerebral palsy which now costs the NHS £4 billion every year. The total annual cost of brain disorders (covering 19 groups of disorders) has been estimated to be €798 billion for the EU alone.

In September 2020, the William Little Foundation published "Cerebral Palsy: causes and prevention", a review of the state of CP research around the world, highlighting work that significantly enhanced our understanding CP but also identifying gaps in research activity where it was felt resources could be applied that would accelerate our ability to combat this devastating condition. Much of this concern centres on the commonly held view of CP as a comparatively ‘rare’ condition, meaning that research investment is significantly less than for conditions with higher incidence and prevalence. While CP’s incidence is estimated to afflict between 1.5 and 4 babies in every 1,000, no one knows this for certain as there are no universally consistent means of diagnosing CP or reporting its incidence in either the developed or developing worlds.

== Research ==
The charity's most recent research projects include:

- Autism spectrum disorder in children with and without epilepsy
- Defining and classifying cerebral palsy
- Clinical and MRI correlates of cerebral palsy

== See also ==
- Autism
- Cerebral palsy
- Attention deficit hyperactivity disorder
