= Suncoast Behavioral Health Center =

- Universal Health Services

Geography
- Location: Bradenton, Florida, United States
- Coordinates: 27°27′35″N 82°36′47″W

Organization
- Care system: For-profit
- Type: Specialist

Services
- Beds: 60
- Speciality: Child and Adolescent mental health

History
- Founded: 1987

Links
- Website: http://suncoastbhc.com/
- Lists: Hospitals in Florida

Suncoast Behavioral Health Center, formerly known as Manatee Palms Youth Services, is a 60-bed psychiatric hospital in Bradenton, Florida.

Manatee Palms was a subsidiary of for-profit Psychiatric Solutions.

The license for Suncoast Behavioral Health Center/Manatee Palms Youth Services was inactive from October 1, 2013, to August 19, 2014, for extensive remodeling. The state review indicated that while operating as a class-four hospital, the facility was placed on an emergency suspension and a moratorium on admissions was imposed effective April 16, 2010 for conditions determined to “pose an immediate risk to the health and safety of the patients.”

== Overview ==
The hospital is an Intensive Residential Treatment Facility accredited with the TJC and Medicaid. Most of the referrals it receives are from Florida Medicaid. It is a locked institution for male and female patients aged 6–17, with on-campus school and sports facilities. Its specialty populations presently has a children's unit, an adolescent male behavioral unit and a Female Behavioral Unit.

== History ==
Prior to becoming Suncoast Behavioral Health Center, the facility was known as Manatee Palms Youth Services. Manatee Palms changed hands twice in the decade 2000–2010. In 2000 it was purchased by Ramsay Youth Services, when that company acquired Charter Behavioral Health Systems of Manatee Palms and the corresponding real estate as a strategic investment. Then in 2003 Ramsay Youth Services was bought by Psychiatric Solutions.

Manatee Palms Youth Services had been required to cease admissions twice by the State of Florida due to widespread abuse and neglect. In April 2007, Manatee Palms instituted a voluntary moratorium on admissions, related to a state investigation into the hiring of staff members with criminal records, insufficient supervision of suicidal patients, and disintegrating physical facilities. Manatee Palms was fined $12,000 by the state, required to make millions of dollars' worth of renovations, and to reduce its patient census to zero before reopening in May 2007.

The facility has also been subject to media attention due to a number of incidents and lawsuits related to accusations that employees engaged in acts of sexual misconduct, employment of a sex offender accused of engaging in sexual misconduct, and accusations that employees used excessive force with patients.
