= Spring Valley Hospital =

Spring Valley Hospital Medical Center
- Universal Health Services; Valley Health System

Geography
- Location: 5400 South Rainbow Boulevard; Spring Valley, Clark County, Nevada, U.S.
- Coordinates: 36.09004°N 115.24054°W

Organisation
- Care system: Private
- Type: Community
- Affiliated university: None
- Network: Universal Health Services; Valley Health System

Services
- Standards: Joint Commission
- Emergency department: Yes
- Beds: 364

Helipads
- Helipad: FAA LID: 2VE2

History
- Founded: October 2, 2003; 22 years ago

Links
- Website: springvalleyhospital.com

Spring Valley Hospital Medical Center is a for-profit hospital is owned by Universal Health Services and operated by Valley Health System. The 364-bed hospital is located in Las Vegas, NV.

== History ==
The hospital opened on October 2, 2003, as the first acute care hospital in southwest Las Vegas. At its founding, the hospital had 170 licensed beds and employed approximately 200 staff.

Over the years, the hospital expanded both its physical facilities and breadth of services in response to the population growth and rising demand in the region. In 2008, Spring Valley introduced open-heart surgery as part of its cardiovascular care offerings.

A neonatal intensive care unit (NICU) (Level III) was established in 2009 to serve high-risk births and provide advanced care for newborns.

In 2016, a new four-story patient tower was constructed, which included: additional private mother-baby rooms, improved access to the NICU and maternity services, and a private entrance for "The BirthPlace" maternity center. Subsequent to that, in 2018 the hospital added 36 private rooms (orthopedic and spine specialty) and fully built out parts of the new tower, increasing its licensed bed count to 328. Around that same time a freestanding emergency department, known as the ER at Blue Diamond, was planned to extend emergency services under Spring Valleys license.

By its 20-year anniversary in 2023, the hospital had grown to 364 licensed beds, doubled its staff, and expanded into specialized areas including advanced cardiovascular interventional procedures (such as transcatheter aortic valve replacement, or TAVR) electrophysiology, neurosurgical interventions, and full stroke care.

== Leadership ==
- Claude Wise, Chief Executive Officer/Managing Director
- Jacob Staley, Chief Operating Officer
- Patience Walker, Chief Nursing Officer
- Jennifer Le, Chief Financial Officer
- Robert White, Associate Administrator

== Services ==
- 32-bed intensive care unit
- Cardiology
- Emergency Services
- Minimally Invasive Surgery
- Neurology Services
- Orthopedics & Spine Program
- Women's Services
- Birthplace Maternity Center
- Surgery
