= Yorkshire County Cricket Club racism scandal =

Yorkshire Cricket Club racism scandal

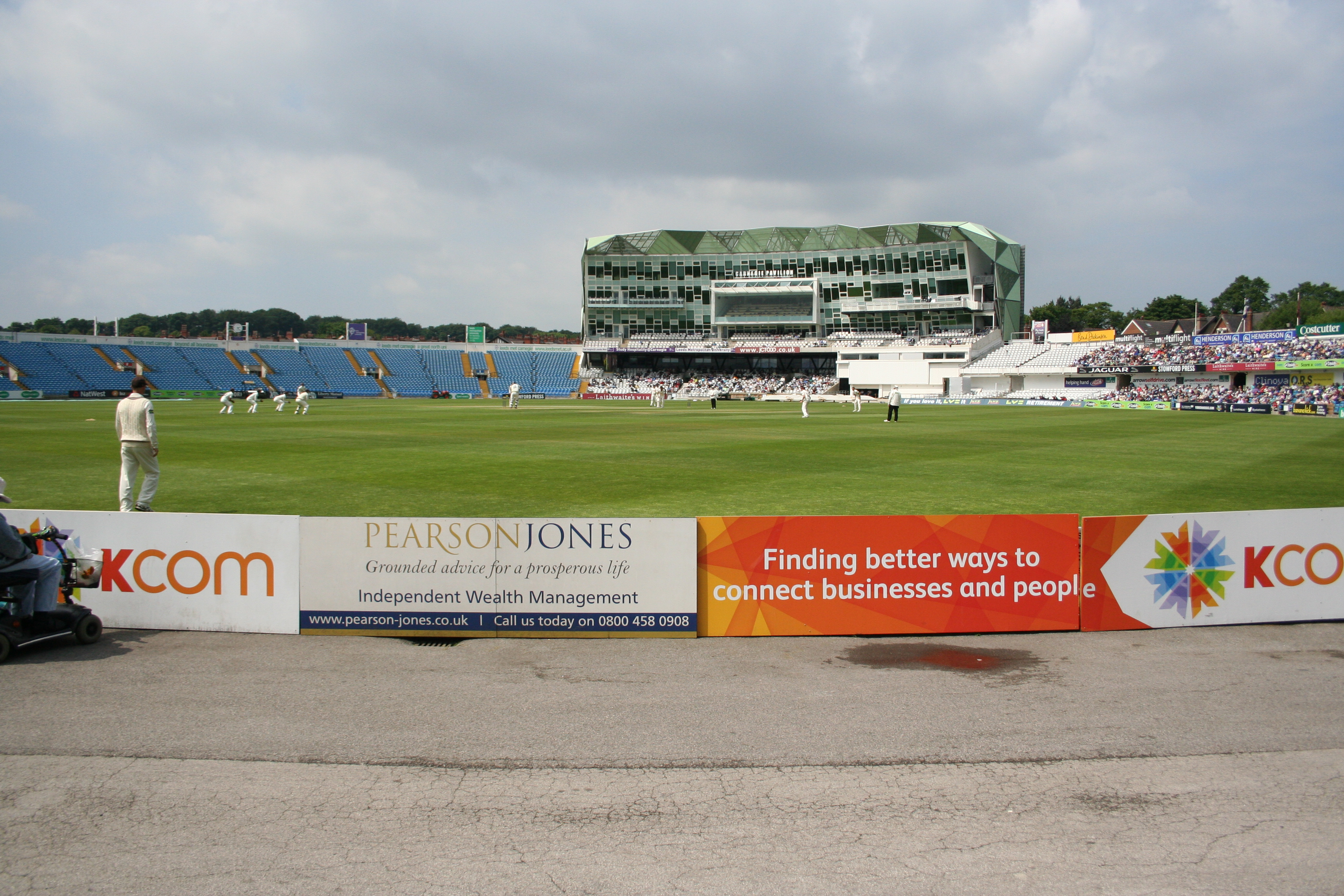
- View of Headingley cricket ground
- Date: 2018–present
- Venue: Headingley Stadium
- Location: Leeds, West Yorkshire, England
- Cause: Racism

The Yorkshire County Cricket Club racism scandal developed from complaints made in 2018 by former Yorkshire cricket player, Azeem Rafiq. Rafiq alleged that he was subjected to racist abuse and bullying during his two tenures at the club between 2008–2014, and 2016–2018 and accused the club of being institutionally racist. He complained officially in 2018, but an independent inquiry was not launched until 2020, leading to criticism of Yorkshire County Cricket Club (YCCC) for its handling of the affair. The chairperson resigned in November 2021, being replaced by Kamlesh Patel. Two former England players have been alleged to have used racist language whilst playing for the club.

== Background ==
Yorkshire County Cricket Club started an investigation in September 2020 into claims that Azeem Rafiq made regarding racist comments made towards him during his tenure at YCCC between 2008–2014, and 2016–2018. Rafiq stated that the racism he encountered while at the club, reduced him to tears and left him close to suicide." The YCCC commissioned an independent law firm to investigate the accusations. This panel consisted of five members, three of whom were BAME representatives. The report they delivered was reviewed by an independent panel, and recommendations were made. However, it has been acknowledged that as far back as 2017, Rafiq complained to the YCCC about racial slurs directed at him and he formalised these comments into an official complaint in 2018, but an inquiry was not launched until 3 September 2020.

When the allegations became public, Rana Naved-ul-Hasan came out in support of Rafiq stating he also was subjected to racist abuse while at the club, an allegation which the YCCC described as "very concerning". Naved stated as "a foreigner", he knew he would not be staying in the UK to live, and so did not wish to raise the issue as he felt it might affect his contract with the club.

== Report ==
YCCC received the independent report in August 2021, which is believed to have cost £50,000. One of the players named in the report, Gary Ballance, admitted that he used "racial language" toward Rafiq on nights out, and that he "deeply regrets" his actions. However, he said that he and Rafiq were "best friends" who used inappropriate language with each other. The report classed the ethnic slur used by Ballance against Rafiq as "friendly banter", which brought a lot of criticism from politicians and campaign groups.

Of the 43 complaints submitted by Rafiq, the report upheld seven complaints. These were,

- Rafiq was not provided with halal food when playing junior cricket for Yorkshire.
- Before 2010, three separate incidents of racist language being used by former players were identified. These were determined to be harassment on the grounds of race.
- Before 2012, a former coach regularly used racist language.
- During his second tenure at Yorkshire (2016–2018), jokes made about religion which made "individuals uncomfortable about their religious practices."
- Between 2016 and 2018, a player made references to Rafiq's weight and fitness that amounted to bullying.
- In August 2018, when Azeem Rafiq raised concerns of racism there was a failure by the club to follow its own policy or investigate these allegations.
- On a number of occasions prior to 2018 the club could have done more to make Muslims more welcome within their stadiums and should have dealt better with complaints of racist or anti-social behaviour within those stadiums."

Rafiq alleged that in 2009, during a county match against Nottinghamshire, Michael Vaughan said while referring to a number of players of Asian descent that there "...are too many of you lot. We need to do something about it." This statement was remembered by other players present.

The panel that assessed the report found that YCCC "failed to implement its policies and procedures" in relation to the complaints raised by Rafiq, and their subsequent handling of those complaints. On the assumption of a new chairperson, Lord Kamlesh Patel on 8 November 2021, he promised to release the full unredacted report to all interested parties.

== Criticism ==
The Independent Panel's report was released to Yorkshire County Cricket Club on 13 August 2021. YCCC released a statement on 19 August 2021 offering profound apologies to Rafiq, but the report remained unreleased. The sitting MPs on the Digital, Culture, Media and Sport committee, demanded that the report be released immediately in its entirety, noting that it had taken three years to get to the report being delivered.

A summary report was released by YCCC on 10 September 2021 which upheld seven out of 43 claims of racism made by Azeem Rafiq. The full report was not published for legal reasons ("in relation to privacy law and defamation"). On 28 October 2021, YCCC released a statement stating that " The Club has also carried out their own internal investigation following the findings in the Report after which they are able to report that they have come to the conclusion that there is no conduct or action taken by any of its employees, players or Executives that warrants disciplinary action."

Rafiq replied on social media "Wow just when you think this club couldn't get more embarrassing you find a way. Still awaiting the FULL report. Thanks for mentioning the people that have provided your PROTECTION & given green light to RACISM[sic]."

The former chairperson of the YCCC, Roger Hutton, complained that he had no support from the England and Wales Cricket Board (ECB). Hutton was quoted as saying that he "...immediately reached out" to the sport's governing body after becoming aware of Rafiq's allegations, but that the ECB had been "reluctant to act" and "declined to help". The UK government also questioned whether or not the ECB was "fit for purpose" over its handling of the affair.

In response, the ECB stated that "Our role is to operate as a regulator across the entire game. We must act independently of any club investigations, should we ever be required to intervene as regulator - either during or after. The reason why our governance is structured in this manner, is perfectly demonstrated in the way that these issues have played out at Yorkshire County Cricket Club."

Hutton himself was criticised in the press for not giving any interviews about the scandal, and was accused of "..[hiding] behind bland, reactive, mostly ill-judged statements...". Hutton was installed as chairperson in 2020 and so was not present at the club for the period that Rafiq was. As a consequence, the two have spoken on the phone, but not actually met in person. Hutton was seen as the only non-involved member who could be a focal point for media, the other senior members of the YCCC hierarchy were subject to the report, so would not be allowed to talk to the press. In an opinion-piece written by Simon Heffer in The Daily Telegraph, Hutton was described as one of the few people who; "..[have] ..emerge[d] from this story with any credit." (in relation to his resignation and apology to Rafiq). Like Hutton, Heffer criticised the ECB, describing their reactions and responses to the scandal "pitiful and pathetic."

== Fallout ==
On 4 November 2021, the ECB condemned the response of the YCCC, and suspended them from hosting international matches. This would have financial implications not only for the club, but also for local businesses who would see a loss of trade from those matches. Similarly, several sponsors of the YCCC (Nike, Tetley's, Yorkshire Tea, David Lloyd Clubs, and Harrogate Spring Water), cut their ties with the club. Emerald Publishing withdrew their support too; previously the ground had been called the Emerald Headingley Stadium.

As a result of the pressure and criticism of the club, including the Prime Minister Boris Johnson, Sajid Javid MP, the Health Secretary, and other senior members of the Conservative Party at least three people resigned their posts, with a fourth person to follow. Roger Hutton, chairman of YCCC, resigned on 5 November 2021, Although he joined YCCC two years after Rafiq left, his tenure was during the inquiry process. He stated in his resignation letter: "The club should have recognised at the time the serious allegations of racism. I am sorry that we could not persuade executive members of the board to recognise the gravity of the situation and show care and contrition."

Allegations of racist comments also surfaced involving Michael Vaughan, who was a team-mate of Rafiq's at Yorkshire in 2009. The BBC announced that his run on the BBC Radio 5 Live programme "Tuffers and Vaughan Cricket Show" would be temporarily halted as the show should remain impartial. The following week's show (due to be broadcast on 8 November 2021) would have discussed the fallout from the YCCC scandal. Ballance, who is still an active cricketer, has been banned from being selected to play for the English cricket team.

Azeem Rafiq noted that he was receiving continued abuse for speaking out.

It was announced on 5 November 2021 that Kamlesh Patel would be taking over as the chairperson of YCCC. At his first press conference on 8 November 2021, he announced that he had taken four immediate steps: settling the employment tribunal with Rafiq (including the cessation of any demands for an NDA), setting up an independent whistleblowing hotline, setting up a review into procedures and policies at YCCC, and pledging to share the full report with all interested parties including the ECB, Rafiq and MPs.

Besides Rafiq and Naved, a further two former players came forward to state that they had been subject to racist slurs whilst playing at the club. It also emerged that staff at the YCCC had been sent grim reaper images on social media and had their tyres slashed whilst parked at the club.

On 9 November 2021, the club announced that its head coach, Andrew Gale, was suspended following an historic tweet from 2010 which had included what the BBC called an "anti-Semitic slur". The tweet had been sent at the time Gale was captain of the club and Rafiq a player, but was not in reference to Rafiq or any of his allegations and had been deleted once Gale had been made aware that it was offensive. On the same day the club announced that Martyn Moxon, their director of cricket, was absent from work due to stress; Rafiq had called for Moxon and Mark Arthur, the club's Chief Executive Officer, to resign. On 3 December 2021, Moxon and Gale were removed from their posts at the club, with a total of sixteen members of staff being removed from their roles. Gale subsequently issued a statement challenging Rafiq's allegations.

On 16 November 2021, the Parliamentary DCMS Committee heard evidence from Azeem Rafiq, former YCCC chair Roger Hutton, and English and Wales Cricket Board CEO Tom Harrison along with other board executives. Current YCCC Chair Lord Patel who was watching the hearing from the public gallery was also invited to address MPs. The Chair, Julian Knight MP, commended Azeem's "bravery in speaking out", acknowledged "the terrible impact on him and his family", and noted that it was "deeply disappointing that YCCC was unable to provide anyone with executive authority to give evidence to the Committee". The Chair also noted that the Committee had "taken the decision not to publish YCCC’s report on its investigation and believe the onus remains with the club to do so." The Committee also published Azeem Rafiq's witness statement from his Leeds employment tribunal.

In July 2022, Kunwar Bansil, the former Yorkshire physiotherapist who was among those removed from their job, stated that he had not witnessed any racism.

The Parliamentary DCMS held a further evidence session on 13 December 2022, at which George Dobell (cricket journalist); Lord Patel of Bradford (Chair, Yorkshire County Cricket Club), Jahid Ahmed (former Essex County Cricket Club cricketer) and Azeem Rafiq appeared. Azeem Rafiq also submitted written corroborating evidence to the Committee as part of his testimony.

== See also ==
- Racism in sport
