= Magellan Health =

Managed health care company

Magellan Health Inc.
- Type: Subsidiary
- Traded as: Nasdaq: MGLN
- Industry: Managed health care
- Founded: 1969; 57 years ago
- Headquarters: Phoenix, Arizona, United States
- Key people: Derrick A. Duke (CEO)
- Revenue: ▲US$ 4.6 billion (FY 2020)
- Net income: ▼US$ 4.0 million (FY 2020)
- Total assets: ▲US$ 1.14 billion (FY 2020)
- Number of employees: 9,092 (2021)
- Parent: Centene Corporation
- Website: www.magellanhealth.com

Magellan Health Inc. (formerly Magellan Health Services Inc.), is an American for-profit managed health care company and subsidiary of Centene that focuses on special populations and other specialty areas of healthcare. Magellan's customers include health plans and other managed care organizations, employers, labor unions, various military and governmental agencies and third-party administrators. It ranked 390 on the Fortune 500 in 2021.

== History ==
The company began as the psychiatric hospital chain Charter Medical, headquartered in Macon, Georgia. In 1992, the company filed for Chapter 11 bankruptcy, stemming from debt incurred as a result of the 1988 management-led takeover.

After recovering from bankruptcy, it moved its headquarters to Atlanta in 1994. Acquiring a major stake in Green Spring Health Services Inc., a managed care company based in Columbia, Maryland, the company re-structured into a new holding company, changing its name to Magellan Health Services. In 1997, Magellan entered the behavioral health managed care business by acquiring Human Affairs International and Merit Behavioral Care. In 1999 the company moved to Green Spring's old headquarters in Columbia, Maryland. In 2004, the company headquarters moved to Connecticut. In 2014, the company moved its headquarters from Connecticut to Arizona.

Magellan sold its managed care division to Molina Healthcare in 2018. On January 4, 2021, it was announced Centene Corporation would acquire the company for $2.2 billion. On January 4, 2022, the acquisition was completed.

Centene divested Magellan Rx in 2022 to Prime Therapeutics. Centene announced the sale of Magellan Specialty Health to Evolvent Health in 2022.
