= List of hospitals in Nevada =

List of hospitals in Nevada (U.S. state), grouped by city and sorted by hospital name.

== Battle Mountain ==
- Battle Mountain General Hospital

== Boulder City ==
- Boulder City Hospital

== Caliente ==
- Grover C. Dils Medical Center

== Carson City ==
- Carson Tahoe Health – Carson Tahoe Regional Medical Center
- Carson Tahoe Cancer Center
- Carson Tahoe Specialty Medical Center
- Sierra Surgery Hospital
- Carson Tahoe Urgent Care
- Carson Tahoe Continuing Care Hospital
- Carson Rehabilitation Center
- Reno Orthopaedic Clinic (ROC) Express (orthopaedic urgent care)
- Renown Urgent Care

== Elko ==
- Northeastern Nevada Regional Hospital

== Ely ==
- William Bee Ririe Hospital

== Fallon ==
- Banner Churchill Community Hospital

== Gardnerville ==
- Carson Valley Medical Center
- Tahoe Fracture Quick Care (orthopaedic urgent care)

== Hawthorne ==
- Mount Grant General Hospital

== Henderson ==
- Healthsouth Rehabilitation Hospital – Henderson
- Henderson Hospital – part of the Valley Health System (Opened October 31, 2016)
- St. Rose Dominican Hospital – Rose de Lima Campus
- St. Rose Dominican Hospital – Siena Campus
- West Henderson Hospital – part of the Valley Health System (under construction, to open late 2024)

== Incline Village ==
- Incline Village Community Hospital

== Las Vegas ==
- AMG Specialty Hospital
- Centennial Hills Hospital
- Desert Springs Hospital – Closed March 11, 2023
- Desert Willow Treatment Center
- Elite Medical Center, An Acute Care Hospital
- Harmon Medical and Rehabilitation Hospital
- Healthsouth Rehabilitation Hospital – Las Vegas
- Horizon Specialty Hospital
- Kindred Hospital Las Vegas, Desert Springs Campus
- Kindred Hospital Las Vegas – Sahara
- Lifecare Complex Care Hospital at Tenaya
- Mountain View Hospital
- Nevada Cancer Institute
- Prime Healthcare Services – North Vista Hospital
- Rawson-Neal Hospital
- Southern Hills Hospital & Medical Center
- Southern Nevada Adult Mental Health Services
- Spring Mountain Treatment Center
- Spring Valley Hospital
- St. Rose Dominican Hospital – San Martín Campus
- Summerlin Hospital
- Sunrise Hospital & Medical Center
- University Medical Center of Southern Nevada
- Valley Hospital Medical Center
- Vegas Valley Rehabilitation Hospital

== Lovelock ==
- Pershing General Hospital

== Mesquite ==
- Mesa View Regional Hospital

== Minden ==
- Carson Tahoe Health Minden Medical Center
- Carson Valley Medical Center Urgent Care

== Nellis AFB ==
- Mike O'Callaghan Military Medical Center

== North Las Vegas ==
- North Vista Hospital
- VA Southern Nevada Healthcare System

== Owyhee ==
- Owyhee Community Health Facility

== Pahrump ==
- Desert View Regional Medical Center

== Reno ==
- Northern Nevada Sierra Medical Center
- Reno Orthopaedic Clinic (ROC) Express (orthopaedic urgent care)
- Renown Health – Renown Regional Medical Center
- Renown Health – Renown Rehabilitation Hospital
- Renown Health – Renown South Meadows Medical Center
- Prime Healthcare Services – Saint Mary's Regional Medical Center
- Tahoe Pacific Hospitals
- VA Sierra Nevada Health Care System
- West Hills Hospital
- Willow Springs Center

== Sparks ==
- Northern Nevada Adult Mental Health Services
- Northern Nevada Medical Center
- Reno Orthopaedic Clinic (ROC) Express (orthopaedic urgent care)

== Tonopah ==
- Nye Regional Medical Center – Closed August 21, 2015

== Winnemucca ==
- Golden Valley Medical Center
- Humboldt General Hospital

== Yerington ==
- South Lyon Medical Center
