= Alan B. Miller =

American businessman (born 1937)

- Born: August 17, 1937 (age 89); Brooklyn, New York City, U.S.
- Education: College of William and Mary; Wharton School of the University of Pennsylvania
- Occupation: Businessman
- Known for: Founder and Executive Chairman Universal Health Services

Alan B. Miller (born August 17, 1937) is an American businessman who is the founder of Universal Health Services, and currently serves as the company's executive chairman. Miller founded the company in 1979 and it has grown to become a large provider of hospital and healthcare services in the US and the UK. In September 2020, UHS announced that Miller would step down as CEO.

== Early years ==
Miller was born in Brooklyn, New York City, New York on August 17, 1937. His father owned a dry cleaner store and his mother worked for a millinery company. As a youth, Miller enjoyed playing sports and worked for a delivery clerk for a grocery store. He also worked for Western Union.

== Career ==
In 1973, the company was in financial trouble and Miller's partner had left the company. Miller took over as CEO of American Medicorp and engineered a turnaround that brought attention within the healthcare industry. American Medicorp became the target of a hostile takeover by Humana in 1978.

Miller transformed Universal Health Services, Inc. from a start-up company that had six employees and zero revenue in 1979 into a Fortune 500 company that is one of America's largest healthcare corporations.

In September 2020 UHS announced that Alan B. Miller would step down as CEO.

== Awards ==
In 1999, Miller received the William & Mary Medallion, the highest award presented to alumni. In October 2007, the college awarded him the T.C. and Elizabeth Clarke Business medallion, the school's highest honor for business achievement. Miller received the George Washington University President's Medal in 2002. He also received the Chairman's Award from the United Negro College Fund. In 2010, Miller received the Horatio Alger Award from the Horatio Alger Association. In 2019, Miller was presented with the Distinguished Citizen Award from the Freedoms Foundation of Valley Forge, Pa. for his commitment to healthcare, serving others, and his civic leadership. In 2019, Alan B. Miller received the Distinguished Civilian Award from the Ben Franklin Global Forum in recognition of his leadership and accomplishments in providing behavioral healthcare to active duty military, veterans and their families.

Miller has been the list of Modern Healthcare magazine's "100 Most Powerful People in Healthcare" for 17 consecutive years since 2003.

=== CEO ===
Financial World magazine listed Miller among the Outstanding 1000 CEOs in 1995 and 1996. In October 2014, Miller was awarded the Innovator Award, Healthcare CEO of the Year by Philadelphia Business Journal. In May 2015, Miller was named to Wall Street Journal's "America's Longest-Serving CEO's." In 2015, Miller was also named among CR Magazine's 2015 Responsible CEOs of the Year. In 2019, Alan B. Miller was named to the Forbes "America's Most Innovative Leaders" ranking (#95). The ranking is created by the Forbes editorial team. In 2019, Alan B. Miller was named to the Philadelphia Business Journal 2019 Most Admired CEOs list. In 2019, Alan B. Miller was named to the Fox Business list of 10 military veterans who became CEOs of Fortune 500 companies. In 2020, Alan B. Miller was highlighted in Wall Street Journal article: New Thinking Emerges on Optimal Tenure for a CEO. In 2020, Alan B. Miller was named to the longest living CEOs globally in the S&P 500 by International Business Times.
