= Khalid Hameed, Baron Hameed =

Businessperson (born 1941)

The Right Honourable The Lord Hameed CBE DL
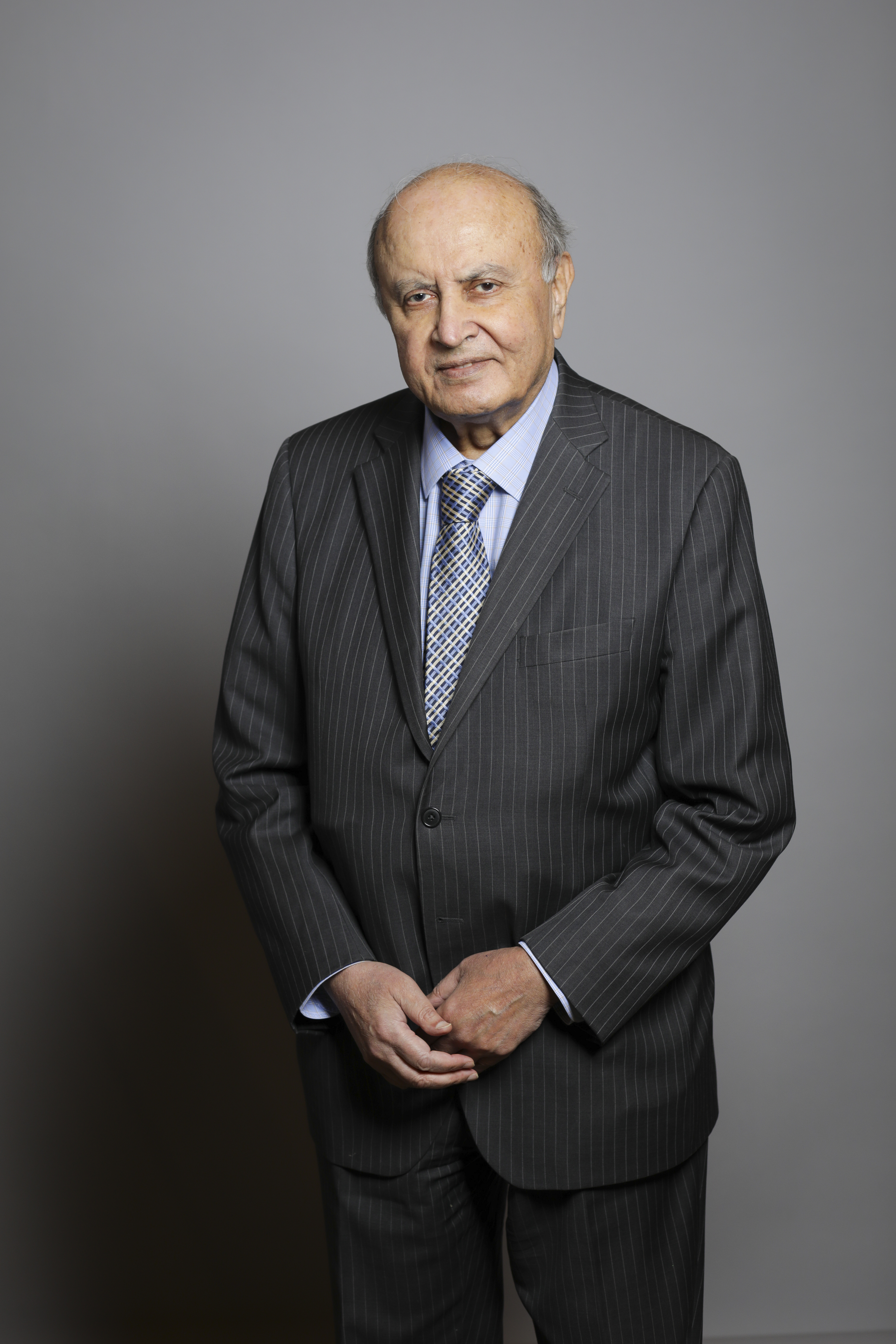
- Official parliamentary portrait, 2019

High Sheriff of Greater London
- In office 2006–2006
- Preceded by: Andrew Everard Martin Smith
- Succeeded by: Jan Stephen Pethick

Member of the House of Lords
- Lord Temporal
- Life peerage 27 March 2007

Personal details
- Born: 1 July 1941 (age 85)
- Party: Crossbench
- Education: Ganesh Shankar Vidyarthi Memorial Medical College, Kanpur, University of Lucknow

Khalid Hameed, Baron Hameed, CBE, DL (born 1 July 1941) is the chairman of Alpha Hospital Group, and chairman and chief executive officer of the London International Hospital. Prior to this, he was the executive director and chief executive officer of the Cromwell Hospital in London. He hails from Lucknow, India.

He chairs the Commonwealth Youth Exchange Council. He is a board member of the British Muslim Research Centre, and also the Ethnic Minorities Foundation. He is an executive member of the Maimonides Foundation and a trustee of The Little Foundation. He received a CBE in the 2004 New Year's Honours. Hameed supports various charities and was awarded the Sternberg Award for 2005 for his contribution to further Christian - Muslim - Jewish Relations. He has received several national and international honours from various countries, including the United Kingdom. He is a governor of International Students House; president of The Little Foundation; chairman of The Woolf Institute of Abrahamic Faiths, and is a vice-president of the Friends of the British Library.

He is involved with inter-religious matters and lectures on this subject.

He was appointed by Her Majesty the Queen as the first Asian high sheriff of Greater London for the year 2006–2007. The office of High sheriff is 1,000 years old and is the second oldest office in the country after the monarchy.

In February 2007, it was announced by the House of Lords Appointments Commission that he will be made a life peer and will sit as a Crossbencher. The peerage was gazetted on 27 March 2007 as Baron Hameed, of Hampstead in the London Borough of Camden. He was also named British Asian of the year 2007. In between the 2019 and 2024 elections, Hameed claimed £27,628 in allowances for showing up to parliament 98 times, despite never speaking, never voting, never sitting on a committee, never holding a government post, and never sending a written question.

He was awarded Padma Shri in 1992 and the Padma Bhushan, "third in hierarchy of civilian awards", by the Government of India in 2009. He was the chief guest at Pravasi Bharatiya Diwas 2010 held in New Delhi.

He is married to Dr Ghazala Afzal, who was appointed High Sheriff of Greater London for 2015–16.

== Arms ==
Coat of arms of Khalid Hameed, Baron Hameed
| Crest A demi-lion Or holding in the dexter foot a foxglove slipped and leaved Proper and in the sinister a seax Gules. Escutcheon Per fess Azure and Gules in chief three saxon crowns two and one and in base three garbs one and two on each of two flaunches Or a salmon haurient head inwards Azure. Motto Pax Virtus Beneficentia (Peace, Virtue, Beneficence) Badge A saxon crown Or encircled by two salmon their heads respectant in chief Azure. |

== Notes ==
Honorary titles
| Preceded by Andrew Everard Martin Smith | High Sheriff of Greater London; 2006 | Succeeded by Jan Stephen Pethick |
Orders of precedence in the United Kingdom
| Preceded by The Lord Bew | Gentlemen; Baron Hameed | Followed by The Lord Krebs |
