= Willow Springs Center =

- Universal Health Services

Geography
- Location: Reno, Nevada, United States
- Coordinates: 39.502°N 119.7572°W

Organization
- Care system: Private
- Type: Specialist

Services
- Beds: 116
- Speciality: psychiatry, DBT Therapy

History
- Founded: 1988

Links
- Website: http://www.willowspringscenter.com
- Lists: Hospitals in Nevada

Willow Springs Center is a residential psychiatric hospital for children located in Reno, Nevada.

== Overview ==
First opened in 1988, Willow Springs Center is owned and operated by a subsidiary of Universal Health Services. Residents live in a secured dormitory setting with a 116-bed capacity. The center helps children, adolescents, and families overcome psychiatric difficulties and return to healthier lives.

== Certification ==
Willow Springs Center is fully accredited by the Joint Commission on Accreditation of Healthcare Organization and licensed by the State of Nevada, as a psychiatric hospital for juveniles between the ages of 12 and 17.
