= Kamlesh Patel, Baron Patel of Bradford =

British politician (born 1960)

The Right Honourable The Lord Patel of Bradford OBE
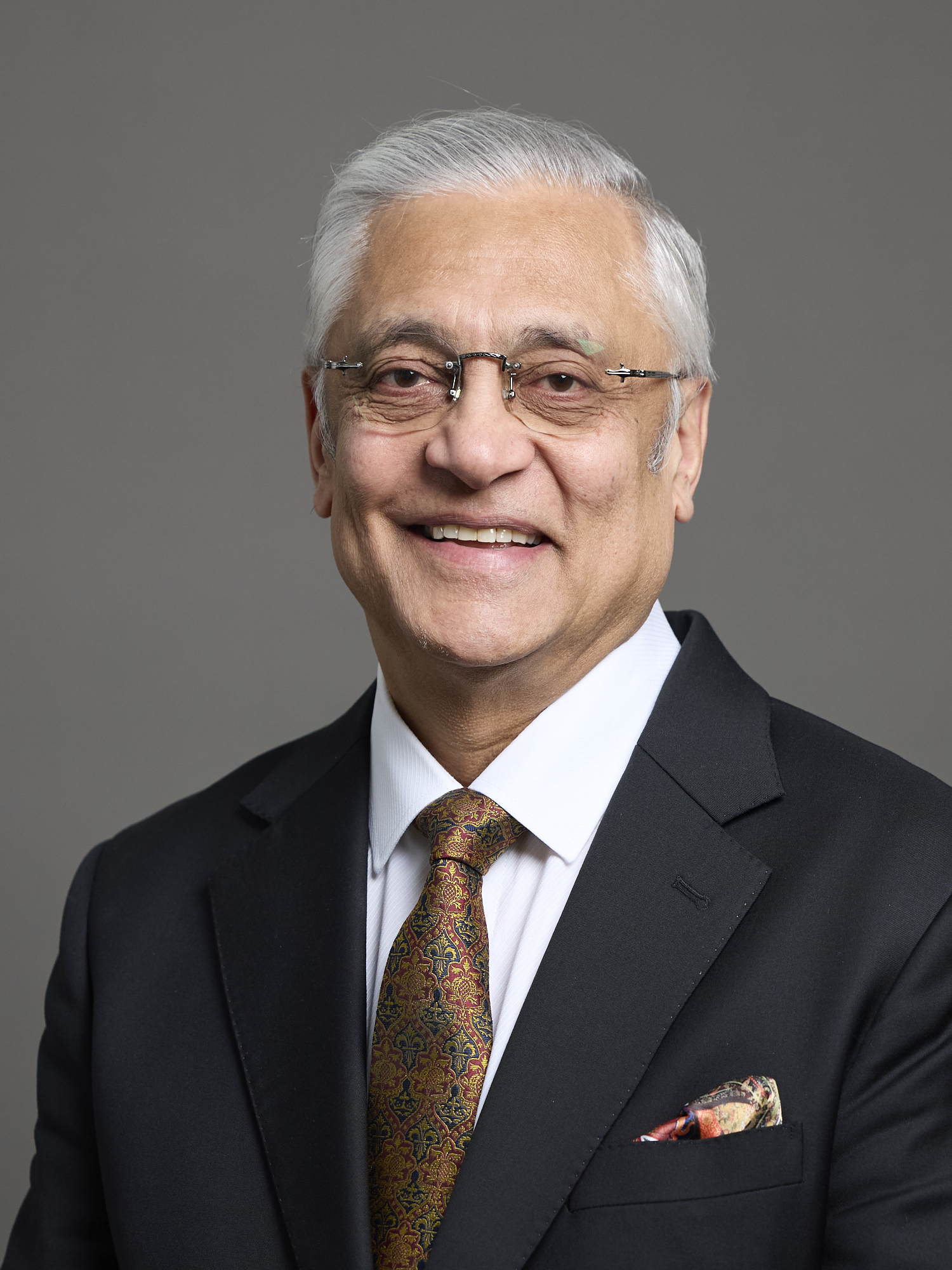
- Official portrait, 2026

Member of the House of Lords
- Lord Temporal
- Life peerage 8 June 2006

Personal details
- Born: 28 September 1960 (age 66)

Kamlesh Kumar Patel, Baron Patel of Bradford, OBE (born 28 September 1960) is a member of the House of Lords. Having been appointed an Officer of the Order of the British Empire (OBE) in the 1999 Birthday Honours, he was created a life peer as Baron Patel of Bradford, of Bradford in the County of West Yorkshire on 8 June 2006. He currently sits as a non-affiliated peer, as of 20 March 2018, but has previously sat as a crossbench (2006–2008), Labour (2008–2012) and Labour and Co-operative (2012–2018) peer.

A qualified Social Worker, he worked in inner city Bradford and then established a number of Third Sector agencies working with those misusing drugs and those with mental health problems; later moving to academia working with a number of universities.

On 19 March 2018, Lord Patel of Bradford was appointed by the Secretary of State for Education and the Secretary of State for Health & Social Care as the Chair of Social Work England. Social Work England is the regulator for all child, family and adult social workers in England.

Lord Patel of Bradford was previously chair of the Mental Health Act Commission. He was a commissioner of the Healthcare Commission and The National Treatment Agency for Substance Misuse. He has over 200 publications and has authored a number of national reports, including The Patel Report into Prison Drug Treatment.

Lord Patel is senior independent director of the England and Wales Cricket Board (ECB), appointed in 2016. He is vice president of the British Board of Film Classification, appointed in May 2018. He is president of the Royal Society for Public Health and the Institute of Healthcare Management and patron/chairman of a number of not-for-profit organisations working in the health, education, social care and criminal justice sectors. He is senior independent director of Cygnet Healthcare and chair of its UK Advisory Board. He is chair of the Independent Health Providers Network, Breaking Barriers Innovations and the India Business Group and a member of Oxford Somerville India Centre. He is patron of Southampton University India Centre, and adviser to the Global Policy Institute at Queen Mary University London.

On 5 November 2021 he was appointed as a director and chair of Yorkshire County Cricket Club, after the previous chairman Roger Hutton resigned following the result of investigation into racism at Yorkshire County Cricket Club.

On 1 June 2024, he became Chancellor of the University of Southampton (jointly with Justine Greening).

== Early life ==
Patel was born on 28 September 1960 in Nairobi, Kenya, to a family of Gujarati descent. His family relocated to the Horton area of Bradford in the early 1960s, and he was educated at the Belle Vue Boys' Grammar School. It was there that he was taken under the wing of two sports teachers, who coached him to become captain of the school cricket team, and as a result he joined the local Manningham cricket club.

== Career ==
Lord Patel spent three years as a social worker with Bradford Council, before going on to work with drug addicts at the Bridge Project, and then setting up his own project to work with vulnerable children.

In March 2018 Lord Patel was appointed the first chair of Social Work England, the new dedicated social work regulator.

== Awards ==
- OBE Awarded Order of British Empire in the Queen's Birthday Honours (1999) for "Services to Ethnic Minority Health Issues".
- Long service medal (Special Constable) – West Yorkshire Police (1991)
- Awarded Plaque of Recognition by the High Commissioner of India and Chairman of the Committee of Honour for "contributions to the enhancement of human welfare and international understanding" Indian High Commission London. (1999)
- Awarded Glory of India Award and Certificate of Excellence by the India International Friendship Society London (2009)
- Awarded Annual Award of Achievement for services to Education by The India International Foundation: London (2009)
- GG2 Leadership Awards - Man of the Year Award for consistent lifetime achievement and contribution to public sector services (2015) AMG Awards London
- Yorkshire Man of the Year: Award for lifetime contribution to the County of Yorkshire (2016) Yorkshire Society

== Government ==
- Life Peer: House of Lords (Independent) (Labour 2008–2018): Lord Patel of Bradford. (June 2006).
- Minister: (Labour) Governments Whips Office House of Lords, Government Frontbench Spokesperson (2008 – 2009) for: Department of Communities & Local Government, Ministry of Justice, Cabinet Office, and Attorney General's Office.
- Shadow Front Bench Minister: (Communities), House of Lords (May 2010 – 2012).
- Member: Select Committee on the Mental Capacity Act 2005 (2013–2015).
- Member: Monitors' Fair Playing Field Review Implementation Group (2013–2015).
- UK Member: UNICEF's Global Task Force on Water, Sanitation and Hygiene (2006–2010) – an international Task Force that included every major global charity in the world working on water, sanitation and hygiene to develop a strategy with the aim of meeting one of the Millennium Development Goals.
- Senior Ministerial Adviser: to the Secretary of State (Communities & Local Government), (2008) – advising on the impact and effectiveness of the Government's PREVENT strategy for addressing the growth of extremism.
- National Strategic Director: National Institute for Mental Health England (2002–2004).
- National Director: The Department of Health Delivering Race Equality in mental health care programme (DRE). (2004–2006).
- Chairman: of DRE Board (2004–2006) – a major multi-million pound Government national strategy and action plan that was implemented across England and Wales. DRE was one of the largest mental health race equality programmes ever undertaken and was based on Lord Patel's 10 years of action research.
- Member: Labour Party Drugs Working Group (non-political advisory appointment) (1989–1990).

== Arms ==
Coat of arms of Kamlesh Patel, Baron Patel of Bradford
Crest Out of a lotus Or a peacock's head Azure beaked Or. Escutcheon Quarterly Gules and Azure a rose Argent barbed and seeded and issuing from each barb a protea slipped Or. Supporters Dexter an elephant Azure the trappings Gules fringed and tasselled Or sinister an elephant Gules the trappings Azure fringed and tasselled and both armed Or. Badge A rose Argent barbed seeded and issuing from each barb a protea slipped Or.

Orders of precedence in the United Kingdom
Preceded by The Lord Marland	Gentlemen; The Lord Patel of Bradford	Followed by The Lord James of Blackheath
