= Cygnet Health Care =

UK private-sector mental healthcare provider

- Industry: Mental health care
- Headquarters: Sevenoaks, Kent, England
- Number of locations: 150 centres 15 rehabilitation sites
- Subsidiaries: Adult services business of Cambian Group PLC
- Website: www.cygnetgroup.com

Cygnet Health Care is an independent provider of health and social care services for young people and adults with mental health needs, acquired brain injuries, eating disorders, autism and learning disabilities within the UK.

In 2024, its social care division won Specialist Provider of the Year at the HealthInvestor Awards.

It is a subsidiary of Universal Health Services, which acquired it for £205 million in 2014.

It has 150 services, operating across 14 different service lines and has a workforce of nearly 11,000 people. Following a consultation with its staff and stakeholders, in May 2023 the company announced it had developed its brand into health care and social care divisions, with an overarching Cygnet as its umbrella.

In December 2016 it bought the adult services business of Cambian Group PLC in a deal worth £377 million. The deal was referred for investigation by the Competition and Markets Authority in May 2017, which ordered the merged company to sell one of its hospitals in the East Midlands, to counter the loss of competition.

Stephen Firn, former chief executive of Oxleas NHS Foundation Trust and a non-executive director of the company, was appointed to lead the healthcare division in 2022.

== New Services ==
In 2024, Cygnet expanded its services to help meet the increased demand for mental health care.

It opened:

- Cygnet Hospital Sherwood, a 44-bed mental health hospital for men
- Cygnet Paddocks, a 28-bed neuro-rehabilitation service for men with brain injuries
- Cygnet Hospital Wolverhampton, a 29-bed mental health hospital for men
- Cygnet Hospital Oldbury, a 27-bed mental health hospital for women

Further expansion is planned for 2025 which will increase Cygnet bed capacity by 200 and bring more than 1,000 jobs to local areas.

== Performance ==
In 2020 it established an independent advisory board. Clare Gerada joined it in March 2021. Lord Kamlesh Patel is Cygnet's Senior Independent Board Director.

=== External Awards ===
Cygnet staff, alongside its health and social care services, were shortlisted at 40 external awards in 2024.

Cygnet was a finalist at the Nursing Times Workforce Awards in the Best Employer for Diversity and Inclusion category, in recognition of its various staff networks, which include a Multicultural Network, LGBTQ+ Network and Women's Network.

Cygnet's social care division won Specialist Provider of the Year 2024 at the HealthInvestor Awards.

Four of its new build hospitals have been shortlisted in the 2025 Healthcare Design Awards.

=== Adolescent care ===
In 2017 the CQC raised concerns about the safety and quality of the firm's hospitals in Sheffield and Woking. It ordered admissions to be suspended at Knole Ward at the Cygnet Hospital at Godden Green, near Sevenoaks, which operates a tier 4 child and adolescent mental health service because of concerns about the use of seclusion and segregation. The company announced in November 2017 that it would no longer provide children and adolescents' mental health services in its regional psychiatric intensive care unit at Cygnet Hospital Woking. In December 2017, Cygnet Health Care was accused of failing vulnerable young patients Three warning notices and fixed penalty notices for failing to make "required notifications" of patient safety incidents were issued by the CQC after an "urgent" inspection in November 2017. The Cygnet Hospital Godden Green was restricted to eight admissions. It was said that staff were "often reliant on police intervention" to manage incidents in the hospital, and were not always competent and skilled. It was rated good after an inspection in February 2018. Plans to open 12 CAMHS eating disorder beds at Godden Green in 2019 were paused after three incidents at the hospital. The CQC issued two warning notices around safe care and treatment, and good governance. In July 2019 the CQC imposed two requirement notices – relating to safe medicines management and having a permanent registered manager - in place on the Godden Green hospital but lifted the restriction on the number of admissions. In October 2020 the child and adolescent mental health unit at Godden Green was closed down by the Care Quality Commission.

=== Services for people with learning difficulties and/or autism ===
Cygnet Woodrow House, a care home for people with learning disabilities and autism, was rated outstanding by the CQC in March 2020. Inspectors said there was "an excellent understanding of seeing each person as an individual, with their own social and cultural diversity, values and beliefs". Cygnet Sherwood House, a learning disability hospital, and Sherwood Lodge, a specialist rehabilitation mental health hospital, were rated outstanding by the CQC in May 2019, with inspectors noting that staff followed best practice and people using the service were treated with compassion and kindness.

In September 2020, Peter Gibson, MP for Darlington, visited Cygnet St Williams, a neuropsychiatric hospital, after it was awarded a Good rating on its first CQC inspection.

=== Newbus Grange ===
A patient was found with "unexplained injuries", patients had chances to kill themselves and staff were asleep on duty, men with autism, learning disabilities and complex needs were restrained by staff through "inappropriate techniques" at Cygnet Newbus Grange hospital, in Darlington. That was the sixth time in 2019 that the CQC found a mental health unit that Cygnet runs inadequate. Sean McNulty, who worked at Newbus Grange, was imprisoned for abuse and ill-treatment of residents. Judge Peter Armstrong described McNulty as a, "sadistic bully", McNulty was found in CCTV footage punching, kicking or slapping one patient 15 times. This was one of four inpatient units which were previously operated by the Danshell Group and acquired by the company in 2018. All four were condemned by the CQC.

=== Yew Trees hospital ===
In July 2020 the company reported staff at Yew Trees hospital in Kirby-le-Soken, which had eight women with learning disabilities, to the Care Quality Commission. They closed the hospital and reported the mistreatment to Essex Police. This included people who they believed witnessed the alleged incidents and failed to report them. This was also one of four inpatient units which were previously operated by the Danshell Group and acquired by the company in 2018. All four were condemned by the CQC.

=== Carers Trust ===
In 2023, Cygnet became the first independent provider to be accredited by the Carers Trust Triangle of Care programme, in recognition of the work it does to involve the carers of patients.

That same year, the company launched a Carer, Family and Friend strategy to ensure loved ones of patients and residents have access to quality care and support.

=== CQC Feedback ===
In 2011 the company was warned by the Care Quality Commission (CQC) about staffing levels at Cygnet Wing Blackheath. Improvements were still required at the CQC inspection in April 2014.

In 2013 the CQC issued a warning in respect of Cygnet Hospital Bierley because the service was failing to ensure that appropriate records were kept.

Cygnet was the subject of a BBC investigation that found that staff within an inpatient unit previously operated by the Danshell Group, had been taunting, provoking and scaring vulnerable people.

Cygnet Acer Clinic in Chesterfield was placed in special measures in September 2019 and admissions to Cygnet Acer Clinic were suspended. At that point Newbus Grange hospital in Darlington (see below), Cygnet Hospital Ealing, Cygnet Hospital Wyke in Bradford, Cygnet Hospital Coventry and Cygnet Hospital Colchester were also in special measures.

After its eighth site, Cygnet Acer Clinic in Derbyshire, was rated "inadequate" in just over a year the company accused the CQC of publishing an "inaccurate picture". The CQC found three-quarters of nursing staff at the Clinic, which provides treatment for 28 female patients with personality disorders and who self-harm, were unqualified, and suspended admissions.

After an assessment of its leadership CQC inspectors said they could not find a "clear line of accountability" across the provider's 140 locations. They said most of the company's services were rated as "good" and some as "outstanding". They found that checks to make sure the directors and board members were 'fit and proper' "had not been carried out" and there was no evidence of references having been taken up during recruitment or that insolvency and bankruptcy searches were done. Cygnet commissioned a corporate governance review by an independent person and took action to make improvements. In response to the CQC review, Cygnet said in a letter published by the BMJ that, following checks verified by lawyers, it was satisfied it was fully compliant and there were no issues around directors' capability, experience, or qualifications.

In April 2021 the company was warned by NHS England that it would not tolerate its repeated service failures in the dozen sites which are directly commissioned by NHSE. In August 2021 it was warned to make rapid improvement actions, which "includes halting further growth plans, while they focus on rapidly delivering patient safety improvements".

== External Visits ==
In January 2024, Ben Bradley, former MP for Mansfield, opened the new Cygnet Hospital Sherwood. In his opening speech, he remarked: "Patients deserve the very best support and Cygnet Hospital Sherwood will ensure that happens for East Midlands and Nottinghamshire men who can receive the treatment and care they need close to family and friends."

Nottingham South Labour MP, Lilian Greenwood, visited Cygnet Hospital Clifton in March 2024, and said "staff were clearly passionate about the work they do."

Andrew Jones, Conservative MP for Harrogate and Knaresborough, visited Cygnet Hospital Harrogate in March 2023. He said "staff are hard working and passionate people who care deeply for their patients."

In April 2023, Claire Coutinho, Conservative MP for East Surrey, visited Tupwood Gate Nursing Home in Surrey, and said "I was particularly heartened to hear about the work they have done with local children with special educational needs and disabilities, welcoming them into the home to reduce loneliness among their residents."

== See also ==
- Mental health in the United Kingdom
