= Psychiatric Institute of Washington =

Coordinates: 38°56′38″N 77°4′41″W

The Psychiatric Institute of Washington (PIW) is an acute (104 bed) psychiatric hospital in Washington, D.C. Opened in 1967, PIW is a short-term, private hospital. It offers behavioral healthcare to patients with mental and addictive illnesses, including children, adolescents, adults and the elderly. Services offered by PIW include inpatient, partial and intensive outpatient hospitalization, and group treatment programs for substance abuse and addiction.

As reported by US News, the Psychiatric Institute of Washington had 2,641 admissions and 1,766 outpatient visits in 2011. The hospital employed five physicians and dentists, twenty-two registered nurses, and ten practical nurses on its full-time medical staff. The hospital's part-time medical staff in 2011 included forty registered nurses and six practical nurses. PIW does not have a surgical unit or offer emergency department services.

== Inpatient services ==
PIW is primarily an inpatient center. Patients admitted into the hospital undergo a standard number of evaluations and staff assignments before being placed on a coed unit. This includes an assessment from the Nursing staff upon first arrival, a psychiatric evaluation, and a complete history and physical exam.

Patients are assigned a social worker as well as a "treatment team" consisting of the social worker, physician, and nurse. In order to give patients a sense of normalcy, every patient receives a complete program schedule for the unit they are placed on and an orientation to the unit's group therapy model.

The Psychiatric Institute of Washington offers six inpatient programs: Adult Psychiatric Services – Detox & Psych units, Child Services, Adolescent Services, The Center, and The School. Each of these programs target specific age and mental health need. As evident from the units' names, PIW serves not only adults seeking mental health support, it also has the capacity to treat younger populations in distress.

== Outpatient services ==
Despite a general focus on inpatient care, PIW does offer two outpatient programs to patients who do not qualify for in-hospital care. The Day Center serves patients with daily anxieties while The Urgent Care Center, a newly established program in partnership with the Department of Mental Health and D.C. Superior Court provides immediate mental health assessments and treatment to defendants with mental health needs, as identified by judges, attorneys, and Pre-Trial Services Agency staff. Both programs are group therapy focused.

== Controversies ==
Since the early 2020s, the Psychiatric Institute of Washington (PIW) has faced increased scrutiny over patient safety, staffing, and treatment practices. Disability Rights DC issued multiple reports documenting patient-on-patient assaults, staffing shortages, and alleged deficiencies in oversight, while raising concerns that the hospital had underreported serious incidents to the District of Columbia Department of Behavioral Health. In 2024, an investigation by the Centers for Medicare & Medicaid Services found that PIW violated federal regulations following the reported sexual assault of a 10-year-old patient by an older patient, citing failures in patient placement and supervision.

PIW has also been the subject of several lawsuits alleging negligence and improper treatment. These include a wrongful death suit filed by the estate of a former patient, a negligence lawsuit alleging the hospital failed to prevent the sexual assault of a patient, and a 2025 federal class-action lawsuit brought by multiple former patients. The class-action complaint alleges that PIW and its parent company, Universal Health Services (UHS), improperly detained patients and prolonged hospitalizations without medical necessity in order to maximize insurance reimbursements. PIW and UHS have denied the allegations and stated that they intend to defend the litigation.

In December 2023, a PIW employee pleaded guilty to first-degree sexual abuse of a ward after sexually abusing an adolescent patient under his care. The following year, several adolescent patients assaulted an employee, obtained a staff identification badge, and escaped from the facility. PIW has disputed many of the allegations made by former patients, employees, and Disability Rights DC, stating that the safety of patients and staff is its highest priority and that it complies with applicable regulatory requirements.
