= South Attleboro, Massachusetts =

District of Attleboro, Massachusetts

Coordinates: 41°54′30″N 71°21′45″W

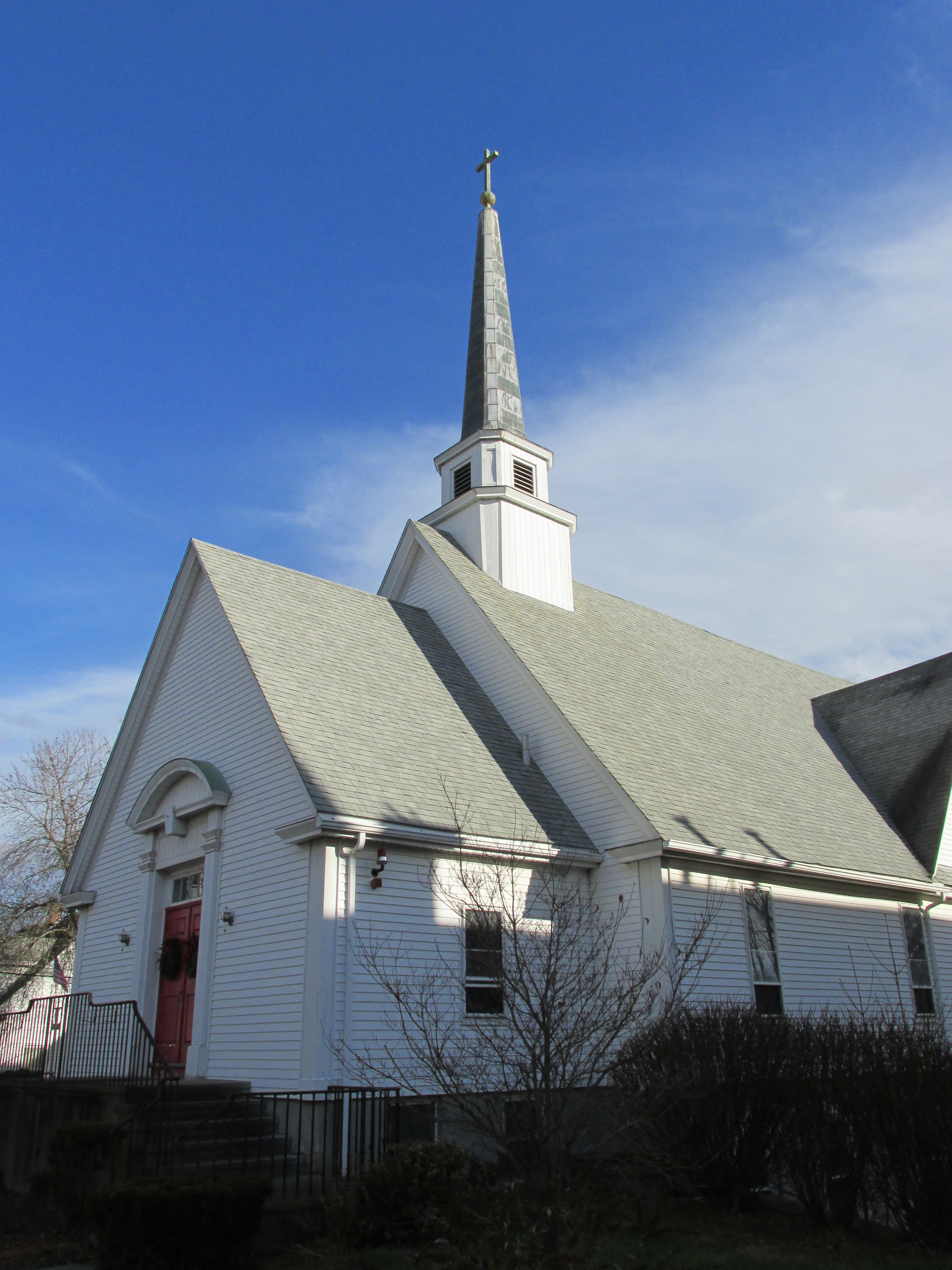
Bethany Village Fellowship

South Attleboro is a village of Attleboro, a city in Bristol County, Massachusetts, United States. It was formerly known as SouthGate, and has its own telephone exchange separate from Attleboro. It is perhaps best known for the South Attleboro station on the Providence/Stoughton Line of the MBTA Commuter Rail. U.S. 1 (the old Norfolk and Bristol Turnpike) and Route 1A (the old Lower Boston Post Road) pass through the area, which lies just north of the Rhode Island state line.

South Attleboro is home to two schools: Robert J. Coelho Middle School and Hill Roberts Elementary School. Lees Pond Park, off Route 1, attracts many local residents for activities such as fishing, basketball, baseball, and swimming in one of the city pools. The South Attleboro Lions Club on Highland Avenue hosts the annual Lees Pond Festival.

Route 1 hosts many businesses and fast food restaurants. Depending on the boundaries, South Attleboro is home to approximately 7–10 thousand people.

South Attleboro

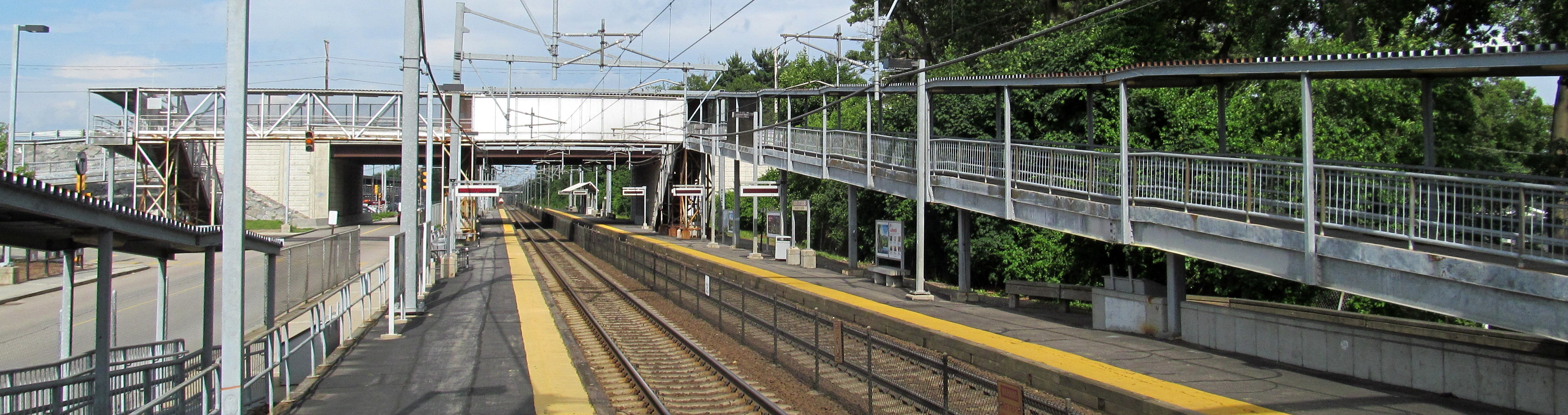
Platforms at South Attleboro station

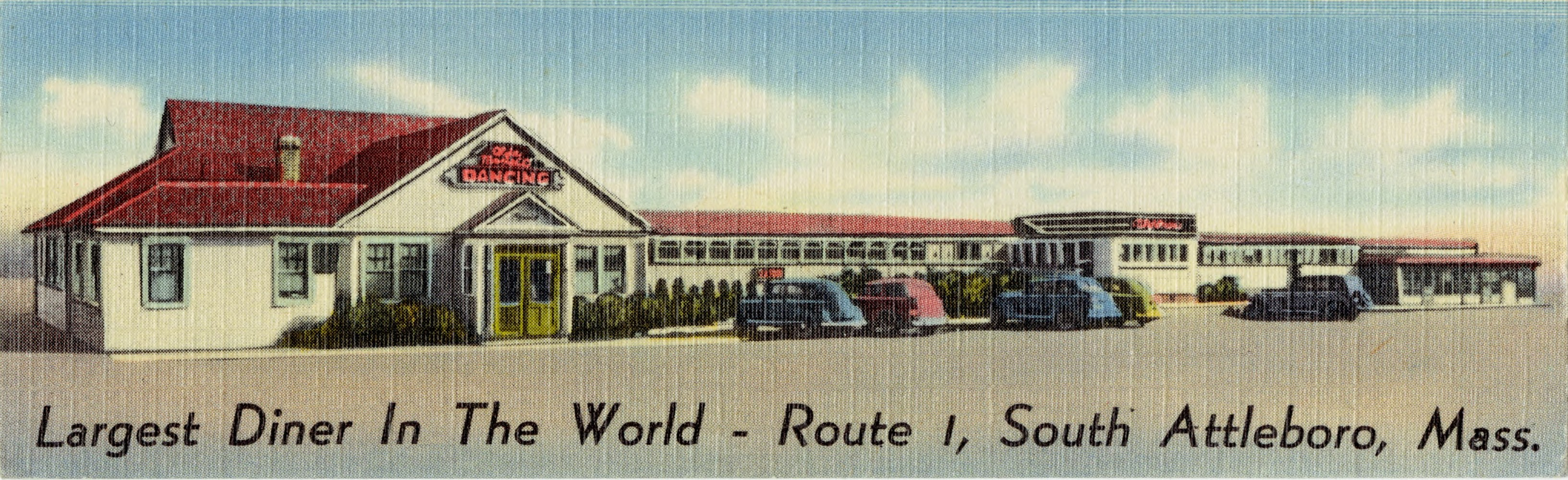
Wightman's Diner

== History ==
Before the end of the industrial boom, most residents worked in the mills of Pawtucket and Central Falls, Rhode Island. In addition, the H&B factory on the state line employed over one thousand workers before shutting down in 1957. The factory was demolished in early 2016.

In 1922, its textile mills were temporarily shut down by the New England Textile Strike over an attempted wage cut.

For several decades starting in the 1920s, South Attleboro was known for Wightman's Diner on Boston Post Road (aka Washington Street, or U.S. Route 1). The diner started out as a lunch wagon in 1923, and expanded by connecting multiple lunch cars by the Worcester Lunch Car Company and Jerry O'Mahony Diner Company. By the 1930s, it advertised itself locally as the "largest diner in the world." In addition, its Old Mexico Room offered fine foods and liquors, a dance floor surface, and floor show. The diner closed in 1946. By the 1960s, the location was occupied by Almac's market and later Yankee Spirits.

== In popular culture ==
South Attleboro is occasionally referenced in the animated series Family Guy, as being home of "Jack's Joke Shop". The real Jack's Joke Shop was located on Tremont Street in Boston until it closed in 2007.

== See also ==
- Dodgeville Mill
