= Psychiatric Solutions =

American operator of psychiatric facilities

- Company type: Subsidiarity
- Industry: Health care
- Founded: 1997
- Founder: Joey A. Jacobs, Bryce DeHaven, Clayton McWhorter, Richard Treadway, & Douglas Lewis
- Headquarters: Franklin, Tennessee, United States
- Area served: United States
- Key people: Joey Jacobs (CEO) Bryce Dehaven (CFO)
- Website: www.psysolutions.com

Psychiatric Solutions, Inc. was an operator of psychiatric facilities in the United States.

Joey Jacobs and Bryce DeHaven, former executives of Hospital Corporation of America for over 20 years, founded Psychiatric Solutions, Inc. in 1997. On May 17, 2010 Psychiatric Solutions was purchased by Universal Health Services.

== Legal issues ==
In 2008, ProPublica, in collaboration with the Los Angeles Times and other news organizations, reported on substandard care, inadequate training, and staffing shortfalls at Psychiatric Solutions, resulting in injuries, sexual assault, and deaths, in a number of their facilities, nationwide.

During the investigation, it was discovered that the company was earning nearly two-thirds of its revenue from Medicare and Medicaid, maintaining a profit margin of 25%, compared to an average of 6% in other facilities, and employed one-third fewer staffers per bed resulting in higher profits for the organization. The company was fined multiple times for safety violations, and at one facility, the federal government took the unusual step of termination from the Medicare program, and withholding federal funds from one facility, for a period of over four months, costing the organization at least $1.5 million in lost revenue. After the CEO, Joey Jacobs, replaced a management team at one facility, saying it would "continue to get better," the problems continued.

In March 2010, Business Wire reported that Psychiatric Solutions was being investigated for breach of fiduciary duty, lying to investors about safety issues at its facilities, and other violations of state laws. Allegations that the director and other company officials made material misstatements and omissions about the company finances and liabilities, in order to inflate stock prices, caused its stock prices to drop, resulting in large losses for shareholders. As more reports were published about the problems at the company, the United States Department of Justice (DOJ) began investigations into the healthcare company, and a class action lawsuit was filed alleging shareholder fraud.

The company was eventually purchased by Universal Health Services, who also paid $132 million in a settlement with the DOJ and other state agencies, for violations of the False Claims Act.
