= Dodgeville Mill =

- U.S. National Register of Historic Places
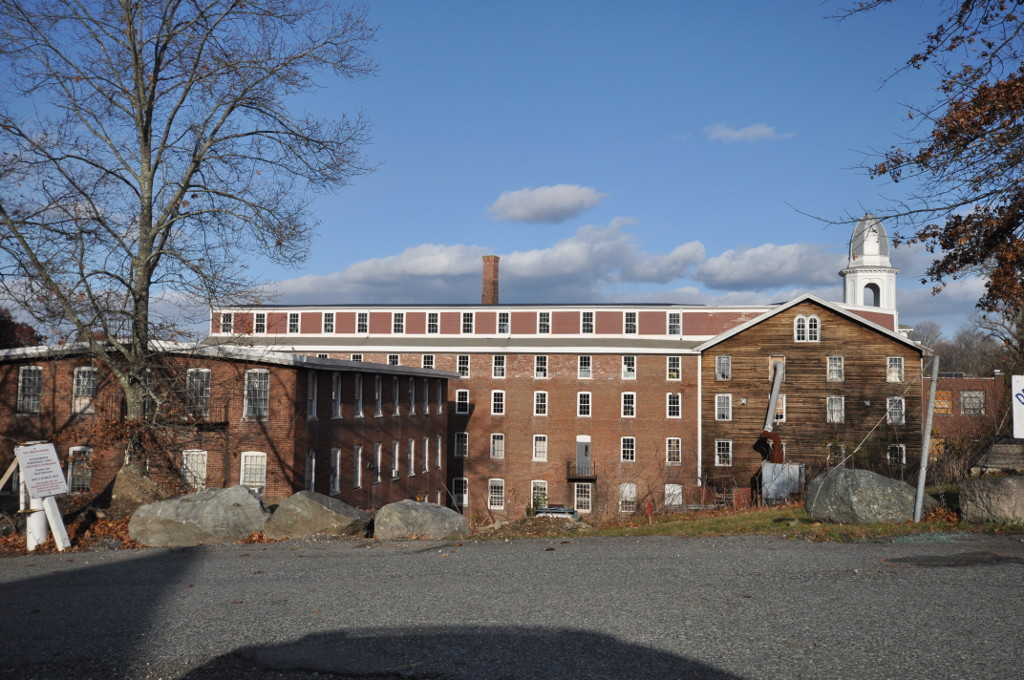

- Location within Massachusetts Location within the United States
- Location: 453 S Main St., Attleboro, Massachusetts
- Coordinates: 41°55′17″N 71°17′49″W
- Built: 1809
- NRHP reference No.: 100003220
- Added to NRHP: December 14, 2018

The Dodgeville Mill is a historic mill complex at 453 South Main Street in Attleboro, Massachusetts. With industrial history dating to 1809, it is one of the city's oldest industrial sites. The complex now consists of an accretion of frame and brick buildings, constructed over the 19th and early 20th centuries. Textile production, which included manufacture of Fruit of the Loom branded products, ended at the site in 1970s.

The mill was added to the National Register of Historic Places in 2018.

== See also ==
- National Register of Historic Places listings in Bristol County, Massachusetts
