= For-profit hospital =

Investor-owned hospitals or hospital networks

For-profit hospitals, sometimes referred to as alternatively investor-owned hospitals, are investor-owned hospitals or hospital networks. Many of the for-profit hospitals are located in Europe and North America, with many of them established particularly in the United States during the late twentieth century. In contrast to the traditional and more common non-profit hospitals, they attempt to garner a profit for their shareholders. The highest charging hospitals in the US are for profit, according to a study published in the journal Health Affairs in 2015.

== United States ==
As of August 2023 in the United States, the three largest such firms are Hospital Corporation of America, Universal Health Services, and Encompass Health. Encompass Health, as the third-largest U.S. national chain, is also the leading provider of rehabilitation services. For profit Psychiatric Solutions was the largest provider of psychiatric services in the nation, until they were bought out by Universal Health Services in 2010.

A conceptually related institution is the for-profit HMO, which now comprises the predominant means of delivering medical services in the United States. Advocates of such institutions claim they are able to provide better care at lower cost due to higher efficiency. It is also said that, in the free market, hospitals have an incentive to do better due to competition. Non-advocates argue that for-profit hospitals promote the medical-industrial complex and can lessen physician-patient interactions.

Detractors, however, claim that the relative success of for-profit medical providers arises from their positioning themselves in the medical marketplace in such a manner as to offer mainly profitable care services for a largely affluent and insured clientele whilst avoiding unprofitable care areas. Critics thus claim, for example, that for-profit hospitals specialize in such highly lucrative fields as medical rehabilitation, elective/plastic surgery, and cardiology while avoiding provision of loss-making services such as emergency medicine which in turn caters mainly to the indigent. Analogously, critics of for-profit HMOs argue that such firms disproportionately insure healthy people, while simultaneously eschewing chronically ill patients, who must then by default be cared for disproportionately by public insurance schemes and non-profit providers—thus a so-called "dumping" of undesirable patients.

== Canada ==
For-profit hospitals have also been criticised by elements of the Canadian medical establishment as providing inferior care at higher cost. See this commentary in the Canadian Medical Association Journal and this editorial in The New England Journal of Medicine.

== India ==
For-profit hospitals in India have recently come under increasing media scrutiny. In an article by the Huffington Post, they spoke about the problems with "corporate hospitals" and senior surgeons being told to sell surgeries to their patients even if they weren't needed. In one instance, a doctor was told he would be sacked if he didn't have enough patients to operate on.
