= Primm Valley Resorts =

Group of hotel-casinos in Nevada, U.S.

Primm Valley Casino Resorts
- Formerly: Primadonna Resorts, Inc.
- Industry: Gaming, hospitality
- Founded: 1990; 36 years ago
- Founder: Gary Primm
- Headquarters: Primm, Nevada, U.S.
- Owner: Primm South Real Estate Company (Landowner); JETT Gaming (Hotel/Casino)
- Website: Official website

Primm Valley Casino Resorts (formerly known as Primadonna Casino Resorts) is a group of three hotel-casinos in Primm, Nevada, along Interstate 15 at the California state line. It is named after the Primm family, benefactors of the hotel and casino properties by Ernest and Gary Primm.

The hotels are a popular stop on the drive between Las Vegas and California.

The various hotels were connected across I-15 by both a monorail and a defunct amusement train line that was connected with Buffalo Bill's and Whiskey Pete's which are now closed.

In June 2026, members of the Primm family signed an agreement with Las Vegas-based Terrible’s, another private company, to operate its hotel-casino and related properties in Primm, Nevada. Primm Valley Resort reopened that July 22.

== History ==
Primadonna Casino Resorts logo (1990–1999)

The hotels were built by Gary Primm and the Primm family at State Line, Nevada, the informal name for the area. The family's history in the area is the reason why it received the official name of Primm.

Whiskey Pete's was the first of their hotels. The Primadonna Resort was the second hotel built, and it was later renamed as Primm Valley Resort. These two hotels were connected by a single-car monorail that rain across the I-15.

Buffalo Bill's was the third hotel built. Buffalo Bill's and Primm Valley Resort were connected by a monorail.

The company acquired an option to buy an 18-acre site on the Las Vegas Strip. Gary Primm of Primadonna Resorts approached MGM Grand Inc. president Bob Maxey in 1994 with an idea for the site: a casino recreating the New York skyline. A joint venture was formed between the two companies, and construction began in March 1995. Completed at a cost of $460 million, the New York-New York Hotel and Casino opened in January 1997.

Terrible's Primm Valley Casino Resorts logo (2007–2011)

The Las Vegas Outlet Mall was added as a part of the Primadonna Resort in 1998.

On March 1, 1999, MGM Grand Inc. acquired Primadonna Resorts in an all-stock transaction that had been announced on November 9, 1998.

Since the initiation of New York-New York, analysts had speculated that MGM Grand or Primadonna would buy out the other's interest in the project. Instead of making such a cash-intensive purchase, however, MGM agreed to buy Primadonna outright for $276 million in stock plus $336 million in assumed debt. The merger closed in March 1999, giving MGM ownership of three casinos and two golf courses at the Nevada–California state line, in addition to full control of New York-New York.

On October 31, 2006, MGM announced plans to sell Primm Valley Resorts to Herbst Gaming for $400 million. The proposed sale would not include the Primm Valley Golf Club, and closed on April 10, 2007, and Herbst Gaming rebranded the casino trio as Terrible's Primm Valley Casino Resorts.

Whiskey Pete's closed in 2024, Buffalo Bill's closed in 2025.

In June 2026, Fox News reported that members of the Primm family had signed an agreement with Las Vegas-based Terrible’s, to operate its hotel-casino and related properties in Primm. Cory Clemetson, grandson of Primm's founder and president of the Primm South Real Estate Company, stated, "We’re pleased we were able to secure such a qualified and like-minded partner for our properties at Primm." The return of Primm will coincide with the pending new Southern Nevada Supplemental Airport (SNSA), which was previously known as Ivanpah Valley Airport, which will be located along Interstate 15 (I-15) near Primm. New construction is expected to begin in 2029, with regional airport completion as early as 2035, according to reports.

On July 5, 2026, Primm Valley Casino Resorts’ operations transitioned from Affinity Interactive’s subsidiary, The Primadonna Company, LLC, to the property’s landlord, Terrible’s. On July 21, 2026, following the July 5 closings on Primm Valley Casino, along with Buffalo Bill’s Casino and Whiskey Pete’s Casino, Terrible's announced the reopening of Primm Valley Casino on the following day, July 22.

== Operations ==
- Primm Valley Resort
- Prizm Outlets
- Several gas stations and convenience stores that surround the casinos and the lottery and convenience store located on a portion of the property in California.

=== Former ===
- Buffalo Bill's
- New York-New York Hotel and Casino (50% with MGM Grand Inc.)
- Primm Valley Golf Club
- Star of the Desert Arena
- Whiskey Pete's
