= Gary Primm =

American casino developer

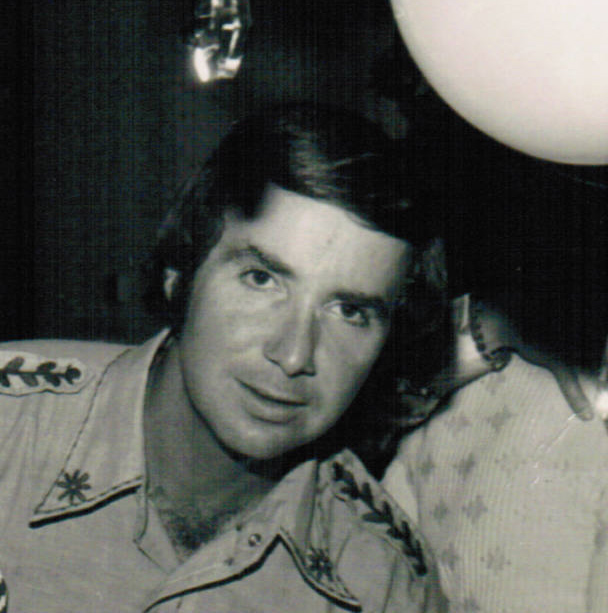
- Born: May 14, 1940 (age 85); San Marino, California
- Occupation: Chairman
- Years active: 1981–present

Gary Primm is an American casino developer. He is the former chairman and chief executive of Primm Valley Resorts.

== Biography ==
Primm grew up in San Marino, California. His father, Ernest Jay Primm, was an early developer of casinos. The town of Primm, Nevada is named after the Primmadonna casino, located there and developed by Gary's father, Ernest Primm. At the time, the city at the southern end of the California-Nevada border was known variously as "State Line" and "Stateline", creating confusion with the similarly named city near Lake Tahoe. The state naming authority considered "Primmadonna" as a new place name, ultimately settling on "Primm."

Primm developed the Primadonna Casino in Primm, Nevada in the mid-1970s. He took over the family business in 1981, after the passing of his father.

Primm and his friend Kirk Kerkorian developed the New York-New York Hotel and Casino in Las Vegas in 1997.

As of 2019, Primm was an owner of a cannabis company, Deep Roots Medical, operating in Nevada.

== Yacht ==
Primm was involved in a tax dispute regarding his 145-foot power yacht, the Prima Donna, which is kept in Newport Beach, California. The dispute was settled by the Orange County Tax Assessor's office, which ruled that the yacht was not in the slip at Newport Beach enough days per year to warrant the collection of taxes.
