= Whiskey Pete's =

Casino hotel in Nevada, United States

Coordinates: 35.611526°N 115.392385°W

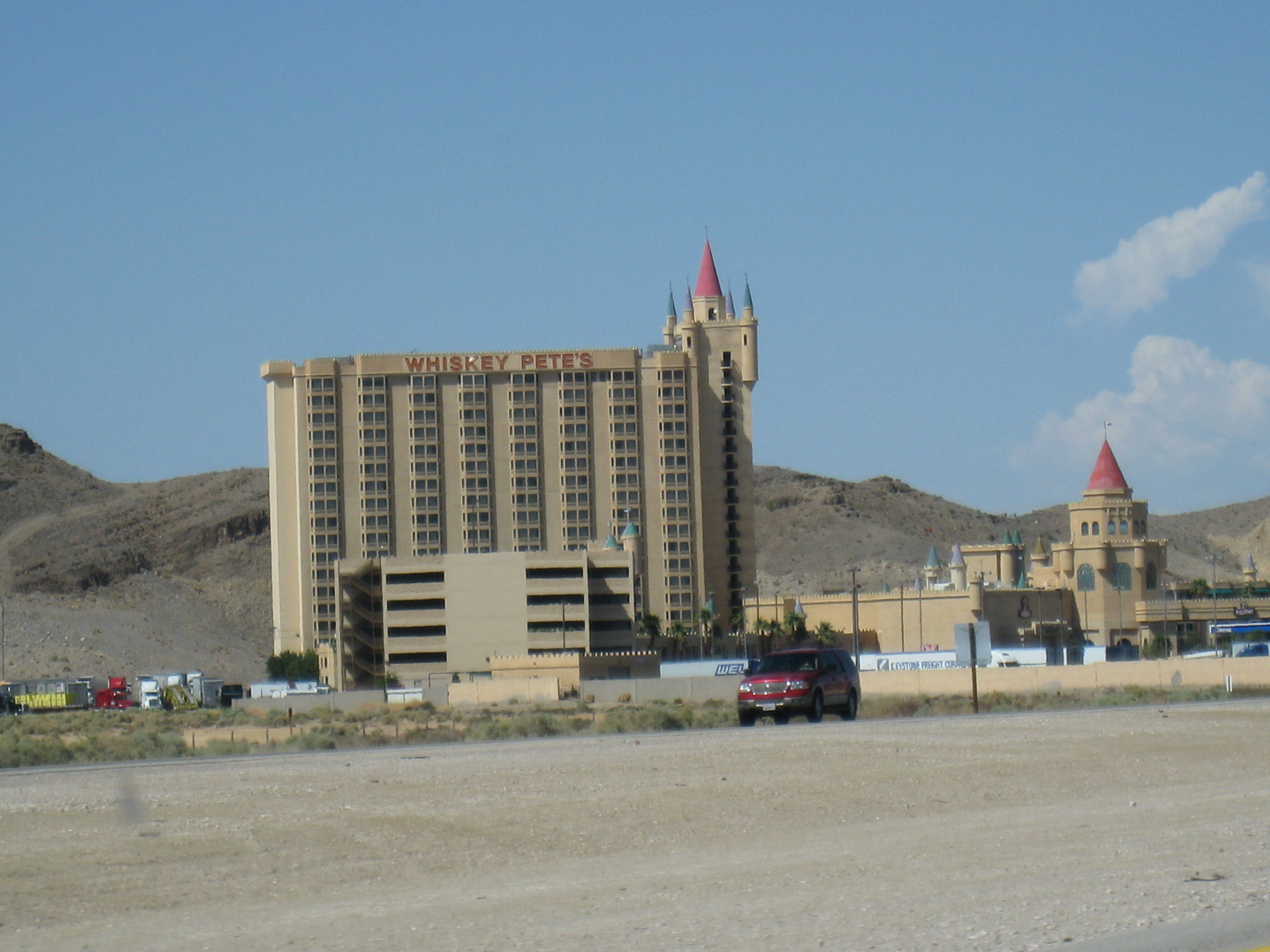
- Interactive map of Whiskey Pete's
- Location: Primm, Nevada, U.S.; 100 Primm Boulevard
- Opened: 1977; 49 years ago
- Closed: December 20, 2024; 19 months ago
- Theme: Old West
- No. of rooms: 777
- Gaming space: 34,800 sq ft (3,230 m^{2})
- Notable restaurants: IHOP (formerly Mega Café)
- Owner: Primm South Real Estate Company (Landowner); JETT Gaming (Hotel/Casino)
- Renovated in: 1983, 1997, 2003, 2004, 2016, 2024
- Website: primmvalleyresorts.com

Whiskey Pete's is a defunct hotel and casino in Primm, Nevada, United States. The hotel had 777 rooms and suites, a swimming pool, a gift shop and four restaurants at the time of its closure. Whiskey Pete's is one of the Primm Valley Resorts, owned by JETT Gaming. The casino covered 34,800 sq ft (3,230 m^{2}) and included a race and sports book.

== History ==
Whiskey Pete's logo (1977–2007)

The area was originally owned by a gas station owner named Pete MacIntyre. Pete is believed to have had a difficult time making ends meet selling gas and had resorted to bootlegging. Primm history remembers him as "Whiskey Pete."

Terrible's Primm Valley Casino Resorts logo (2007–2011)

When Whiskey Pete died in 1933, legend has it that he wanted to be buried standing up with a bottle of bootleg in his hands so he could watch over the area. Whiskey Pete's unmarked grave was accidentally exhumed while workers were building a connecting bridge from Whiskey Pete's to Buffalo Bill's (on the other side of I-15). The body was moved and is now said to be buried in one of the caves where Pete cooked up his moonshine.

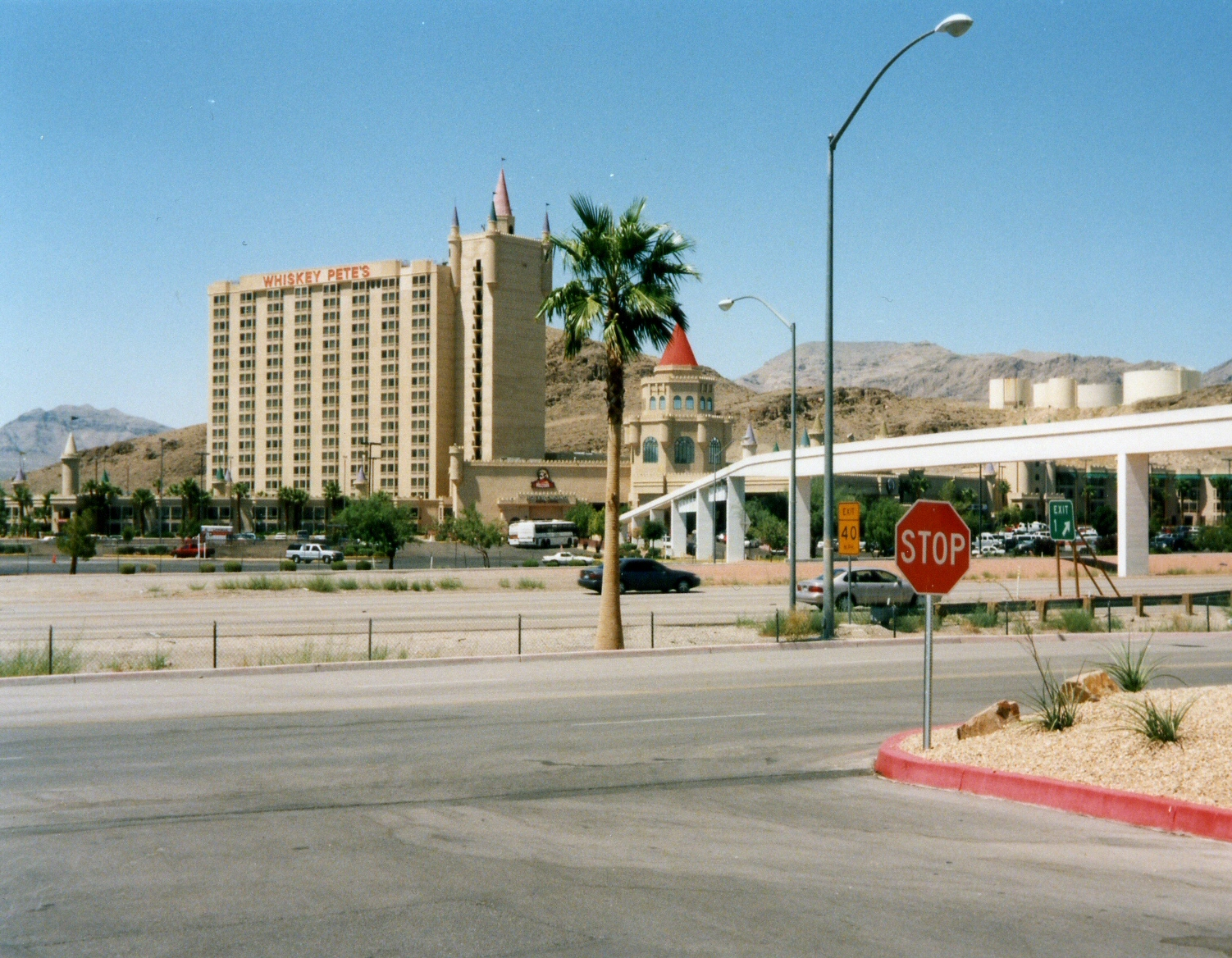
I-15 and Whiskey Pete's

Whiskey Pete's was opened in 1977 by Ernest Jay Primm as the first of the casinos to be located at what was then called State Line.

In 1993, a new hotel tower was constructed as part of an expansion of the property.

In late 1998, Whiskey Pete's offered the roof of the parking garage as a Valley Hospital Flight For Life Base.

=== Closure ===
On December 20, 2024, Whiskey Pete's closed. In March 2025, Clark County gave permission to Affinity to allow the hotel to be closed for up to three years. It has initial approval to be closed for two years with the possibility of two six month extensions allowing for a three-year closure. Affinity plans to repurpose their properties in Primm to serve more as travel resources for motorists driving in from California. The development of the Southern Nevada Supplemental Airport, which would serve as a second airport for the Las Vegas Valley has also been cited as a reason for the redevelopment.

== Bonnie and Clyde's death car ==
The automobile in which Bonnie and Clyde were killed was on display in the lobby of Whiskey Pete's until the COVID-19 pandemic. In the 1990s, the vehicle was exhibited for several years at Primm Valley Resort and Terrible's Gold Ranch Casino in Verdi before being returned to Whiskey Pete's in July 2011. It was then moved back to Primm Valley Resort briefly before being moved to Buffalo Bill's in late 2022, where it resided until 2025 when it was moved back to Primm Valley Resort after the closure of Buffalo Bill's.

== Alexander Harris Case ==
Alexander Harris, a seven-year-old child from Mountain View, California was reported missing from the video arcade of Whiskey Pete's in November 1987. A body was discovered one month later off the property. Howard Lee Haupt, of San Diego, was later arrested on suspicion, but was acquitted of all charges in 1989.

== Transportation ==
Free shuttle buses operated between Whiskey Pete's and the resorts other hotels, Primm Valley Resort and Buffalo Bill's.

Whiskey Pete's was connected to Primm Valley Resort by a free single-car monorail across Interstate 15. The tram was constructed by Schwager-Davis using the UniTrak technology and was retrofitted in 1996. The tram traveled at 15 mph and transported 1,200 people, per hour, per direction (pphpd). Doors on either side allowed passengers to enter and exit the tram at the same time, thus reducing the dwell time from 2 minutes to 1 minute. Trams arrived every 3 to 5 minutes. However, the tram had not run as early as 2016 for unknown reasons.

== In popular culture ==
The Vikki and Vance Casino in the 2010 video game Fallout: New Vegas is based on Whiskey Pete's. The casino features the death car of fictional outlaws Vikki and Vance, who are inspired by Bonnie and Clyde.

== See also ==
- Roach, Nevada
