= Primm Valley Resort =

Resort Casino in Primm, NV

Coordinates: 35.609882°N 115.385757°W

Primm Valley Resort & Casino

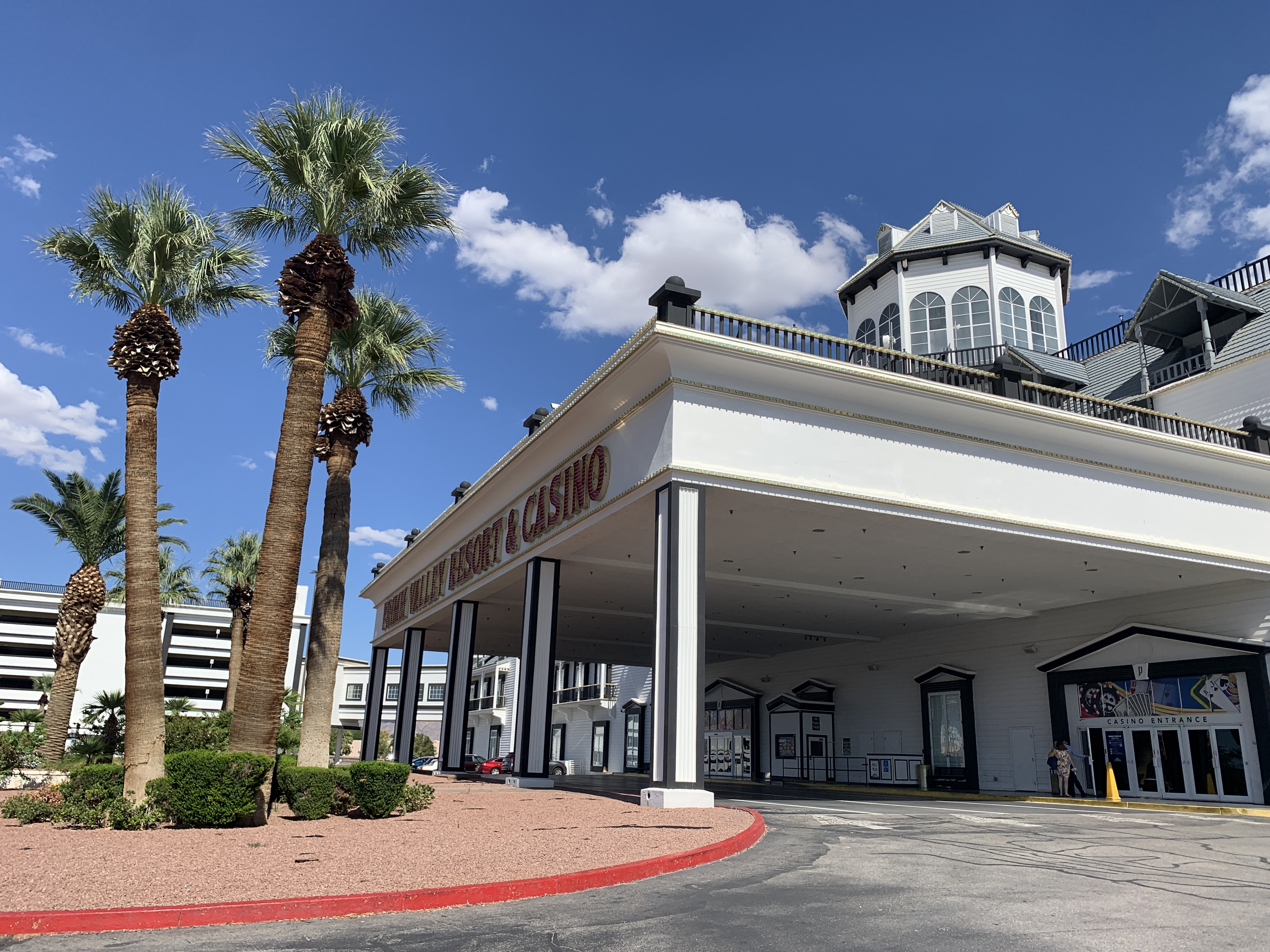
- Interactive map of Primm Valley Resort & Casino
- Location: Primm, Nevada, U.S.; 31900 Las Vegas Boulevard
- Opened: 1990; 36 years ago
- Theme: Victorian, Country Club, Boutique Hotel
- No. of rooms: 624
- Gaming space: 37,779 sq ft (3,509.8 m^{2})
- Signature attractions: Prizm Outlets, Spa at Primm, Primm Valley Golf Club
- Notable restaurants: Country Club Buffet, Original Pancake House, GP'S Steakhouse, Starbucks, Subway
- Owner: Primm South Real Estate Company (Landowner); JETT Gaming (Hotel/Casino)
- Previous names: Primadonna Resort & Casino; Terrible's Resort and Casino
- Renovated in: 1994, 1998, 2000, 2012, 2022-25
- Website: primmvalleyresorts.com

Primm Valley Resort & Casino (formerly Primadonna Resort & Casino) is a hotel and casino located in Primm, Nevada. It is one of the Primm Valley Resorts, owned and operated by JETT Gaming until 2026, when Las Vegas-based Terrible’s took over operations in July. It is named after the Primm family, benefactors of the hotel and casino properties formerly owned and operated by Ernest and Gary Primm.

The hotel offers 624 rooms and suites. The casino has 37,779 square feet (3,509.8 m^{2}) of gaming space, with 773 slot machines, 26 table games, and a William Hill race and sportsbook. The resort is adjacent to the Prizm Outlets shopping centre. The resort closed on June 29 to facilitate the transition to Terrible Herbst. It reopened on July 22.

Free shuttle buses operated between the Primm Valley Resort and Primm's other hotels, Whiskey Pete's and Buffalo Bill's. Primm Valley Resort had an exhibit located between the adjacent Primm Outlets featuring the bullet-riddled car that Bonnie and Clyde were driving when they were killed.

== History ==
Built by Primadonna Casino Resorts and opened in 1990 as Primadonna Resort & Casino.

The Fashion Outlets were added as a part of the Primadonna Resort & Casino in 1998.

On October 31, 2006, MGM Mirage announced plans to sell the Primm Valley Casino Resorts, which includes the Primm Valley Resort & Casino, to Herbst Gaming for $400 million. The sign in front of the resort had been renamed from Primm Valley Resort and Casino to Terrible's Resort and Casino in 2007 and was renamed back as Primm Valley Resort and Casino in 2011.

On March 23, 2009, the Herbst family relinquished control of the Terrible's Primm Valley Casino Resort, along with both other properties, to their lenders. On May 5, 2026 Primm Valley Resorts announced they will close remaining properties, including the Primm Valley Resort. On June 16, 2026, the gas station, and casino company Terrible Herbst reached a deal to retrieve the resort from imminent closure. On July 22, the casino was reopened by Terrible's after a 17 day closure.

== Bonnie and Clyde's death car ==
The automobile in which Bonnie and Clyde were killed is on display at the Primm Valley Resort. It was previously on display at Whiskey Pete's and Buffalo Bill's before those hotels closed in 2024 and 2025 respectively. It had also once been displayed at Terrible's Gold Ranch Casino in Verdi before being returned to Whiskey Pete's in July 2011. It was then moved back to Primm Valley Resort briefly before being moved to Buffalo Bill's in late 2022, where it resided until 2025 when it was moved back to Primm Valley Resorts after the closure of Buffalo Bill's.
