= Buffalo Bill's =

Hotel and casino in Nevada, United States

Coordinates: 35.614945°N 115.384504°W

Buffalo Bill's Resort & Casino

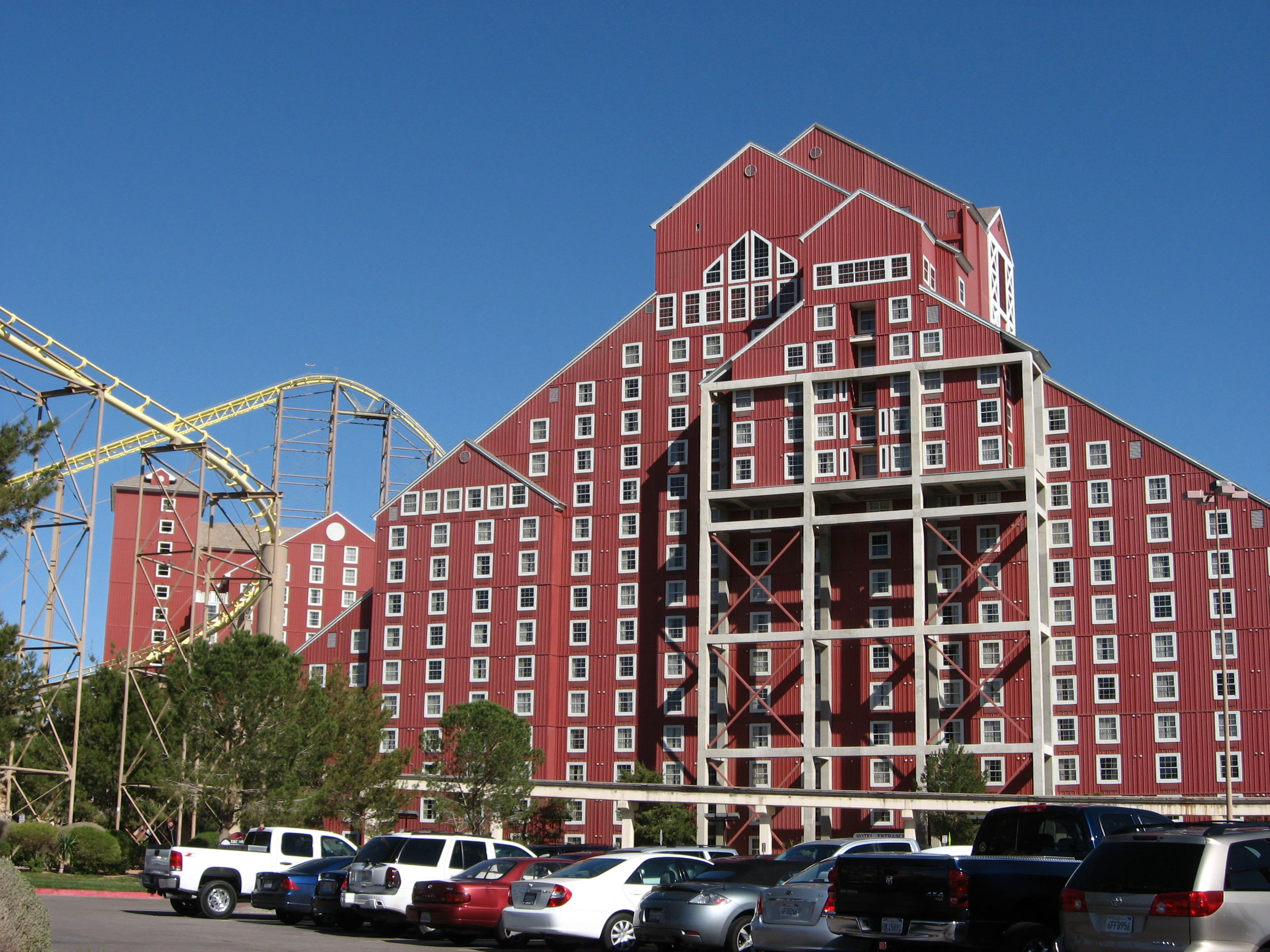
- Interactive map of Buffalo Bill's Resort & Casino
- Location: Primm, Nevada, U.S.; 31700 Las Vegas Boulevard
- Opened: May 14, 1994; 32 years ago
- Closed: July 7, 2025; 15 months ago
- Theme: Old West
- No. of rooms: 1,242
- Gaming space: 61,372 sq ft (5,701.6 m^{2})
- Permanent shows: Star of the Desert Arena
- Signature attractions: Desperado; Adventure Canyon Log Flume; Frog Hopper; Turbo Drop (1997-2017); Zone Arcade; Movie theater
- Notable restaurants: Denny's
- Owner: Primm South Real Estate Company (Landowner); JETT Gaming (Hotel/Casino)
- Renovated in: 1995, 2004, 2010, 2015, 2020–2022
- Website: primmvalleyresorts.com

Buffalo Bill's is a defunct hotel and casino in Primm, Nevada, United States, at the California state line. It was one of the Primm Valley Resorts, owned and operated by JETT Gaming. It had 1,242 guest rooms and suites at the time of its closure. The hotel was home to the Desperado roller coaster, a hypercoaster with a 225-foot drop, and a top speed of 80 mph, a log flume ride, as well as a pool in the shape of a buffalo. The hotel-casino had two hotel room towers: the Annie Oakley Tower (the A Tower) and the Buffalo Bill Tower (B Tower). It was named after Buffalo Bill.

The 61,372 sq ft (5,701.6 m^{2}) casino had over 1,700 slot machines, as well as table games and a race and sports book. Buffalo Bill's was also home of the Star of the Desert Arena, a 6,500-seat arena designed for concerts.

== History ==
The casino opened on May 14, 1994 with 592 hotel rooms, and a new tower was added in 1995.

Terrible's Primm Valley Casino Resorts logo (2007–2011)

The ribbon cutting for the change of ownership for Primm Valley Resorts from MGM Mirage to Herbst Gaming was held at Buffalo Bill's on April 10, 2007.

Herbst undertook a marketing strategy of appealing especially to California Latinos, including the addition of Spanish-speaking dealers, charter bus trips from the Inland Empire, concerts by norteño musician Ramón Ayala, and a Mexican restaurant branded with Ayala's name.

The interiors and exteriors of the casino were used in the movie Top of the World (1997) starring Peter Weller, Dennis Hopper and Tia Carrere. Until 2019, the roller coaster was usually running only on weekends.

In March 2019, Cuca's Mexican Food, originally from Redlands, California, opened their first hotel location in Nevada within Buffalo Bill's. This restaurant is an extension of the brand that has 6 locations in the Inland Empire of California.

=== Final years and closure ===
Buffalo Bill's closed on March 17, 2020, due to the COVID-19 pandemic. It underwent renovations, which included restaurant upgrades and new slot machines, before re–opening on December 23, 2022. However, when the property re–opened, the roller coaster and log flume did not re–open again due to Clark County regulations.

Following a decline in business around the Primm area, it was announced that the hotel and casino would close again on July 7, 2025, with the property only operating on special events.

== Bonnie and Clyde's death car ==
The automobile in which Bonnie and Clyde were killed was on display at Buffalo Bill’s. It was previously on display at Whiskey Pete's until the COVID-19 pandemic. In the 1990s, the vehicle was exhibited for several years at Primm Valley Resort and Terrible's Gold Ranch Casino in Verdi before being returned to Whiskey Pete's in July 2011. It was then moved back to Primm Valley Resort briefly before being moved to Buffalo Bill's in late 2022, where it resided until 2025 when it was moved back to Primm Valley Resorts after the closure of Buffalo Bill's.

== Tram to Primm Valley ==
A tram linked Buffalo Bill's to nearby Primm Valley Resort. The multi-car tram was designed by Schwager-Davis to their UniTrak standard. Despite its name, the tram actually ran on two guideways. Each car accommodated 24 people; the four-car trains seated 96 people with no standees. The system transported 2,200 people, per hour, per direction (pphpd). An attendant supervised each tram, although the tram was controlled by a computer.

After disembarking at the Primm Valley Resort station, passengers could connect to a free single-car tram across I-15 to Whiskey Pete's. Both services have not run since the mid 2010's.

== In popular culture ==
The Bison Steve Hotel, a location featured in the 2010 video game Fallout: New Vegas, is based on Buffalo Bill’s.
