= Slot route operator =

Type of gambling company

A slot route operator is a company that owns and operates slot machines in several locations. By providing this service, many small businesses are able to provide slot machines that they could not otherwise afford to operate.

As operators have grown, they have been able to offer linked machines to provide larger jackpots, and affinity cards to reward frequent players.

Operators are generally licensed in the same manner as a casino. In Nevada, they are licensed and regulated by the Nevada Gaming Commission.

In the United States, slot routes are currently operated in Nevada, Montana, South Dakota, Oregon and Illinois.

== Slot route operators ==
- Accel Entertainment
- Eclipse Route Operations - ECL Gaming
- Gaming & Entertainment Management - Delaware North
- J&J Ventures
- JETT Gaming - Terrible Herbst
- Lattner Entertainment Group Illinois - Boyd Gaming
- Prairie State Gaming - Penn National Gaming

== Sources ==
- Las Vegas Review-Journal
