= New York-New York Hotel and Casino =

Hotel and casino in Paradise, Nevada

New York-New York

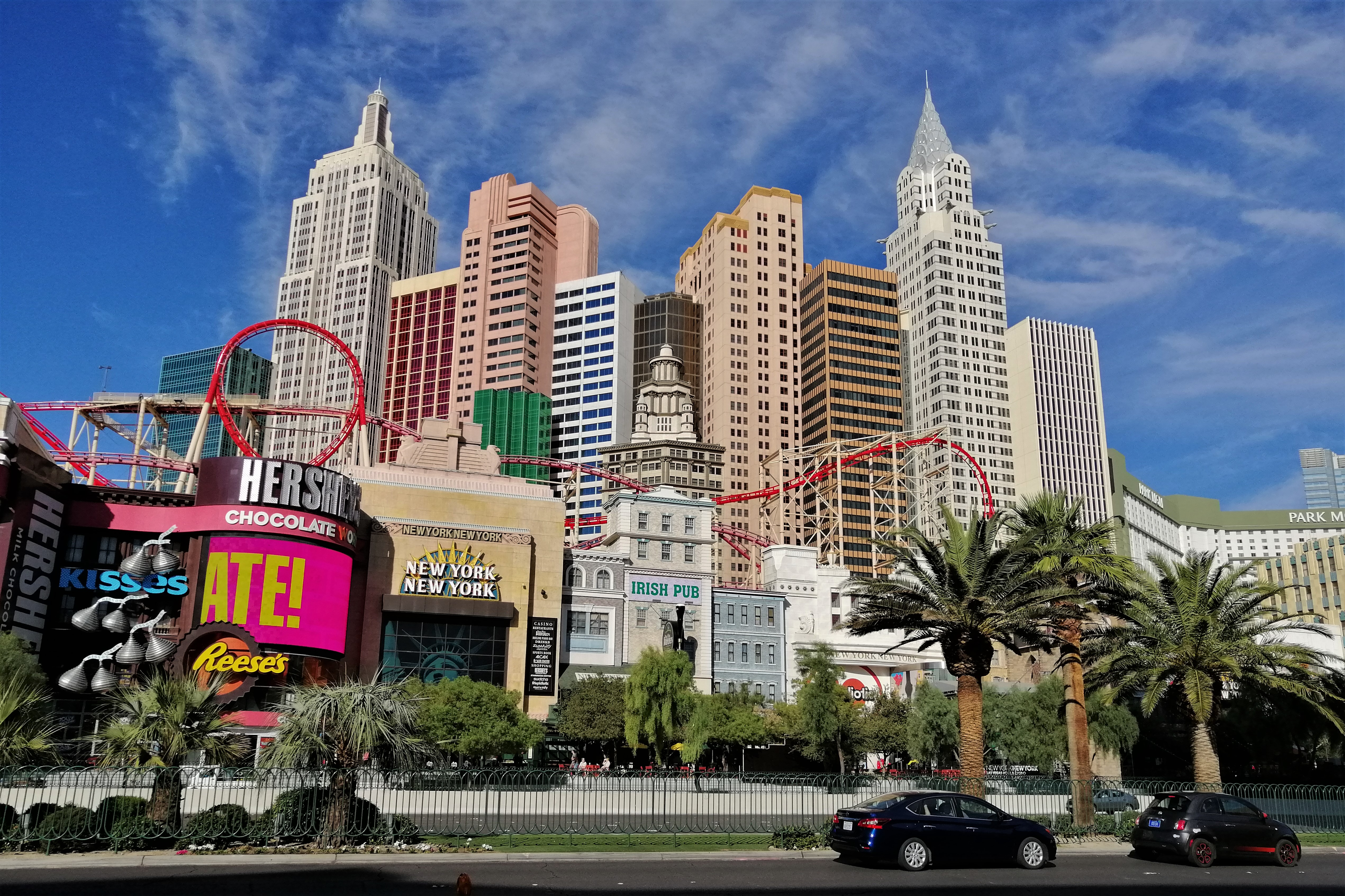

- Location within Las Vegas Strip Location within Nevada
- Interactive map of New York-New York
- Location: Paradise, Nevada, U.S.; 3790 South Las Vegas Boulevard; 36.1020°N 115.1746°W
- Opened: January 3, 1997; 29 years ago
- Theme: New York City
- No. of rooms: 2,024
- Gaming space: 51,765 sq ft (4,809.1 m^{2})
- Permanent shows: Zumanity (2003–2020); Terry Fator; Mad Apple (2022–2026)
- Signature attractions: Big Apple Coaster; Hershey's Chocolate World
- Notable restaurants: Gallagher's Steak House; Nine Fine Irishmen; Il Fornaio
- Casino type: Land-based
- Owner: Vici Properties
- Operating license holder: MGM Resorts International
- Architect: Neal Gaskin; Ilia Bezansky
- Renovated in: 1999, 2013–14, 2023
- Website: newyorknewyork.com

New York-New York Hotel and Casino is a casino hotel on the Las Vegas Strip in Paradise, Nevada, United States. It is owned by Vici Properties and operated by MGM Resorts International, and is designed to evoke New York City in its architecture and other aspects. The design features downsized replicas of numerous city landmarks such as the Statue of Liberty. The hotel tower represents various skyscrapers. Its tallest structure is a replica of the Empire State Building, standing at 47 stories and 529 feet (161 m). This made New York-New York the tallest building in Nevada until the completion of Wynn Las Vegas in 2005. The property includes the Big Apple Coaster, which travels around the hotel tower. The casino is 51,765 sq ft (4,809.1 m^{2}), and the hotel contains 2,024 rooms.

Construction began in March 1995, and the resort was built at a cost of $460 million. It opened on January 3, 1997, as a joint venture between MGM and Primadonna Resorts. MGM bought out the latter's ownership stake in 1999. After the September 11 attacks, a spontaneous memorial site emerged in front of the resort's Statue of Liberty. An official memorial was added in 2003, but was demolished 10 years later when the resort's façade was remodeled. A Hershey's Chocolate World was added in 2014, as part of the remodel. The resort has hosted various entertainers and shows, including comedian Rita Rudner, who performed there from 2001 to 2006; and the show Zumanity, which ran from 2003 to 2020.

== History ==
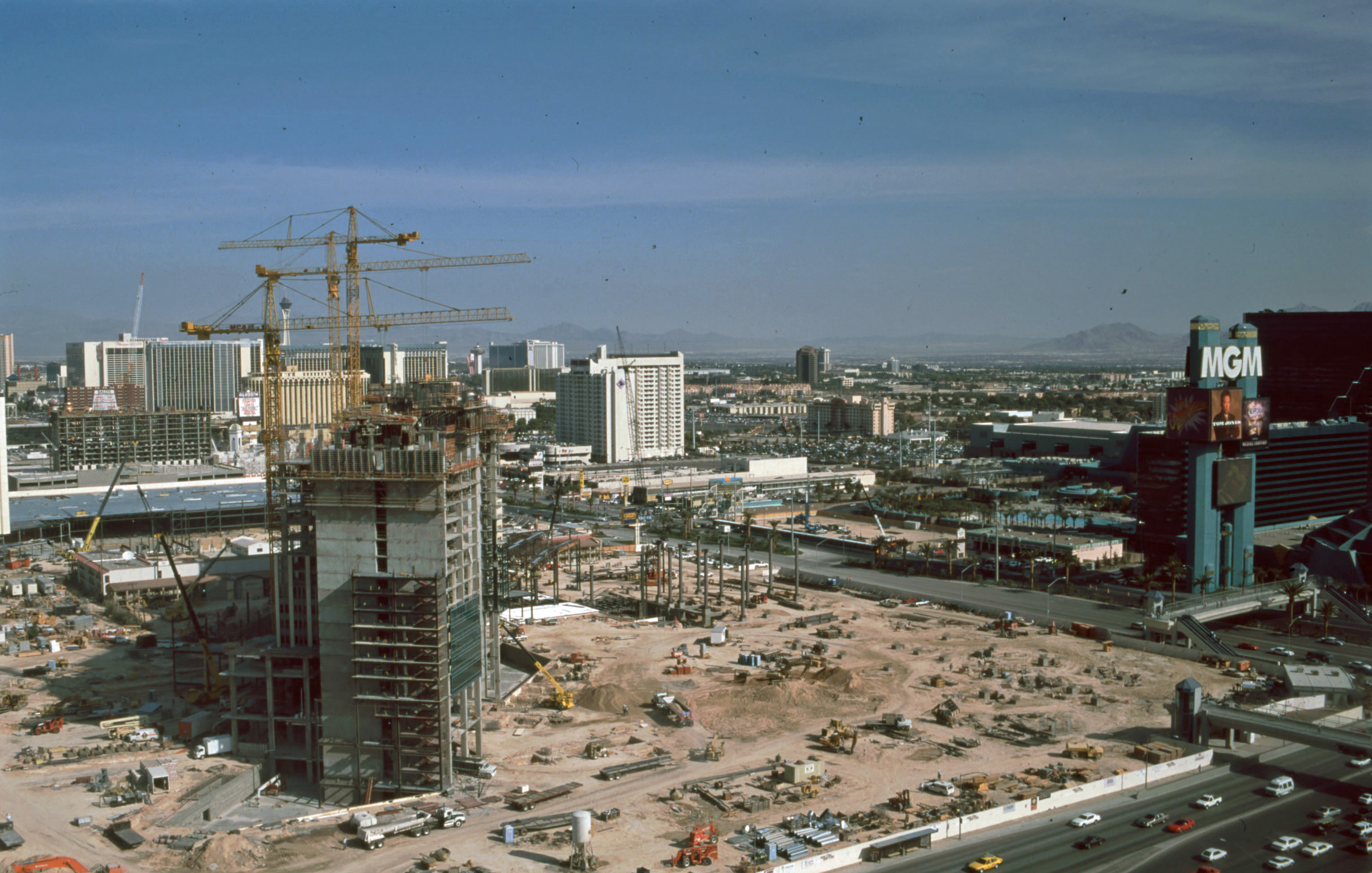
New York-New York during construction, 1995

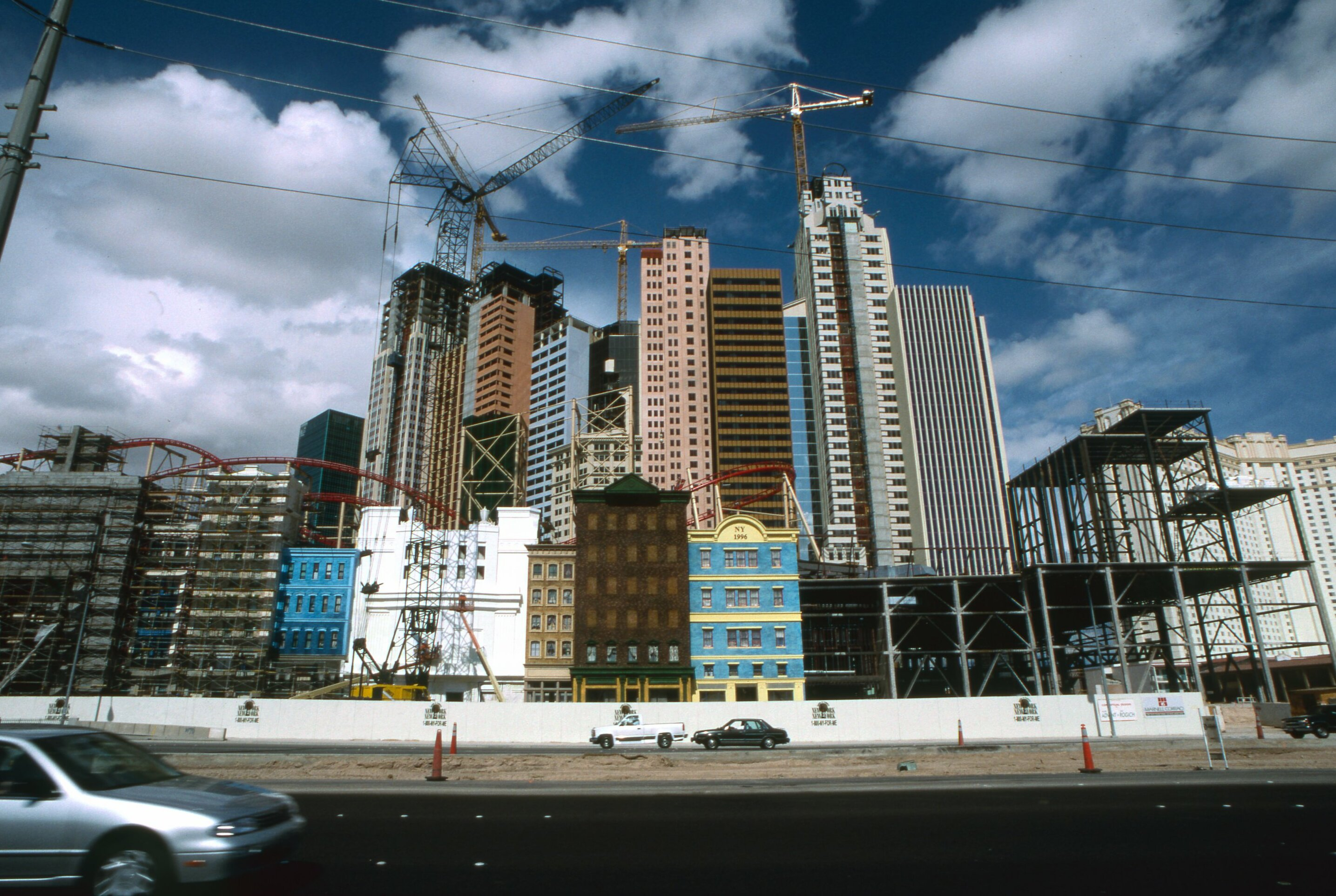

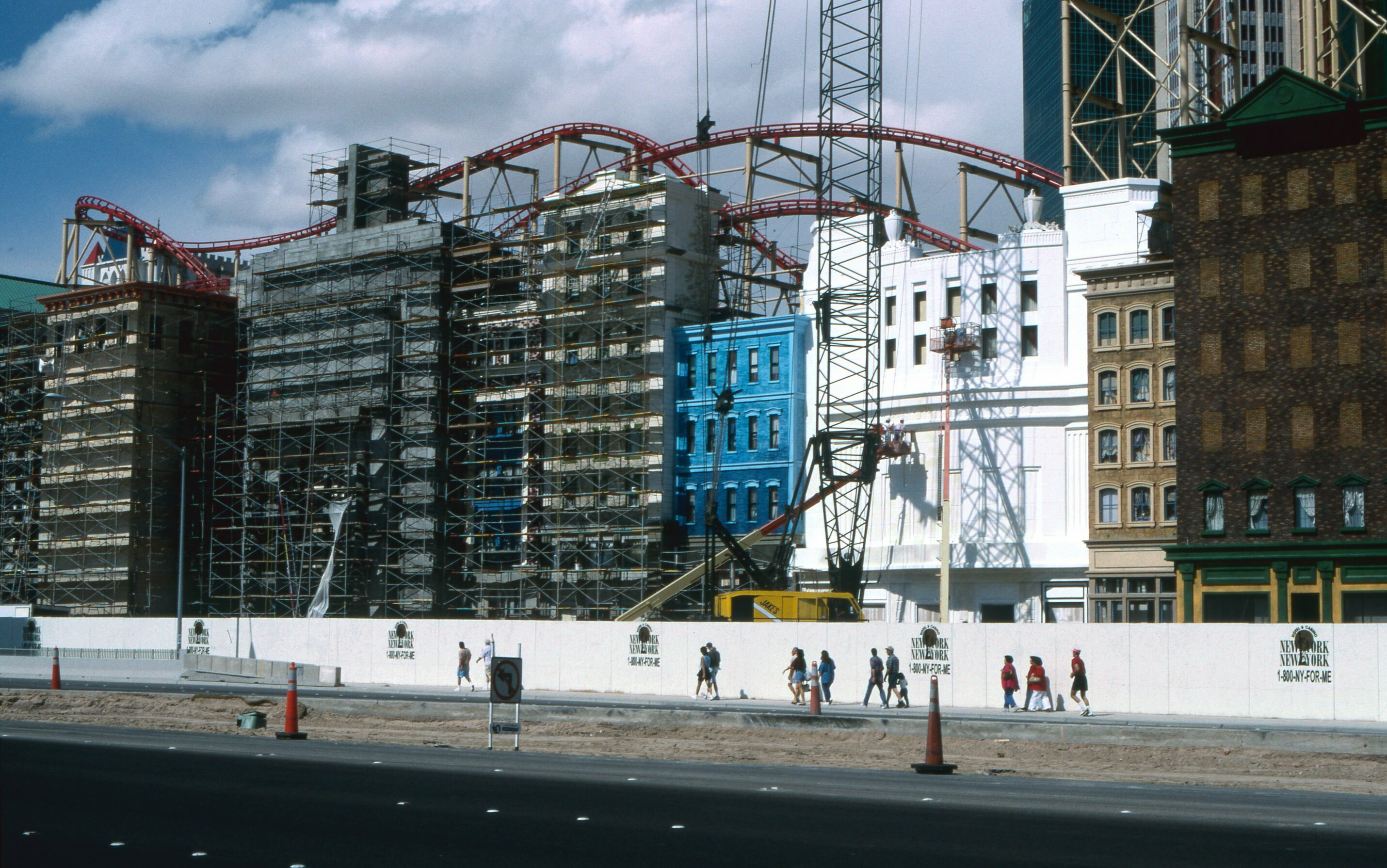
New York-New York during construction, May 1996

The 18-acre site at the northwest corner of the Tropicana – Las Vegas Boulevard intersection had been considered a prime spot for development due to its proximity to the MGM Grand, Excalibur, and Tropicana. Japanese firm Universal Distributing owned the property, and had discussed a joint venture with the Promus Companies to build a hotel-casino, but could not reach an agreement. In 1992, Kirk Kerkorian's Tracinda Corporation bought the site for $31.5 million and offered MGM Grand Inc., of which Kerkorian owned 76%, a free two-year option to buy it.

The idea of a casino modeled after the New York skyline was conceived by Sig Rogich (a former White House staffer and United States Ambassador to Iceland) and Mark Advent. Rogich brought the idea to his friend, Gary Primm, head of Primadonna Resorts. Primm approached MGM president Bob Maxey in 1994 with the idea for MGM's prime Strip location, and a joint venture was formed between the two companies. Construction began on March 30, 1995. The site had been partially occupied by the Lone Palm Motel and a Rodeway Inn.

The resort was scheduled to open on December 15, 1996, but this was pushed back nearly three weeks. Requests for pre-opening tours, made by media outlets and financial analysts, were rejected to maintain secrecy up until the resort's debut. Completed at a cost of $460 million, New York-New York opened on January 3, 1997, at 12:30 a.m. A pre-opening celebration occurred the night before, with a fireworks show and 3,000 invited guests that included rival casino executives and celebrities.

The resort's restaurants and room service were overseen by subcontractor ARK Restaurants Corporation, which employed non-union workers. In 1997, employees pushed for unionization with the Culinary Workers Union. ARK was against unionization and fought against allegations for the next six years that it had violated the National Labor Relations Act, ultimately losing in court.

In 1998, the Frank Sinatra compilation album Lucky Numbers was put on sale exclusively at New York-New York, before receiving a wider release later that year. It includes the song "Theme from New York, New York".

Since the initiation of New York-New York, analysts had speculated that MGM Grand or Primadonna would buy out the other's interest in the project. Instead of making such a cash-intensive purchase, however, MGM agreed to buy Primadonna outright for $276 million in stock plus $336 million in assumed debt. The merger closed in March 1999, giving MGM full control of New York-New York.

The 2001 film Ocean's Eleven was to include a scene of New York-New York being imploded, but this was removed following the September 11 attacks, and was replaced by a fictional hotel called the Xanadu. After the attacks, people spontaneously sent various tributes to New York-New York, especially T-shirts from police, fire and rescue departments around the country. These were displayed along the fence in front of the "Lady Liberty" replica. Other items included flowers and candles. Within a few days of the attacks, the spontaneous memorial site contained thousands of items. The twin towers of the original World Trade Center have never been included in the hotel's skyscraper façade, which is meant to represent New York City in the 1940s; the World Trade Center was built in the 1970s. The towers were also considered too tall to be included. However, there was a mural inside the casino depicting the Twin Towers that was modified in 2003 to remove the towers.

An official September 11 memorial was unveiled at the site in 2003, featuring display boxes for various items. Some items, including approximately 4,000 T-shirts, were archived at Lied Library, part of the University of Nevada, Las Vegas (UNLV). New York-New York planned to rotate items from the collection to be displayed at the resort. Future items left at the resort would be donated to UNLV for archiving. The memorial site was created by Marnell Corrao Associates, which took inspiration from the Vietnam Veterans Memorial and the Oklahoma City National Memorial. The memorial was removed in 2013, as MGM began a remodel of the property's façade along Las Vegas Boulevard. A commemorative plaque was built at the former memorial site, while the items remain in storage at UNLV as of 2021. The collection contains nearly 6,000 items, most of them T-shirts.

Ownership of New York-New York, along with many other MGM properties, was transferred to MGM Growth Properties in 2016, while MGM Resorts continued to operate it under a lease agreement. Vici Properties acquired MGM Growth, including New York-New York, in 2022.

In August 2022, New York-New York announced plans to spend $63 million completely renovating 1,830 rooms and 155 of its suites by mid-2023.

=== 2007 shooting ===
On July 6, 2007, gunman Steven Zegrean opened fire inside the casino shortly after midnight, wounding four people before bystanders subdued him. Zegrean had been depressed over two failed marriages and financial problems, and intended to commit suicide by cop. He faced 52 charges, although 16 would eventually be dismissed. In 2009, he was found guilty and sentenced to 26 to 90 years in prison. He died of a heart attack the following year. One of the victims filed a lawsuit against the resort and MGM Resorts, alleging inadequate security.

=== Stamp error ===
The Statue of Liberty Forever stamp, issued by the U.S. Postal Service in 2010, was intended to show the actual Statue of Liberty in New York Harbor, but instead shows the replica at New York-New York. This is due to an error by the stamp designers, who incorrectly chose a stock photo of the replica instead of the original and did not recognize the difference. Even after the error was recognized, the Postal Service continued producing the stamp. A Postal Service spokesman said the service "would have selected this photograph anyway", citing its popularity and the service's desire to produce a stamp that appeared different from previous stamps depicting the Statue of Liberty.

Robert Davidson, the sculptor of the Las Vegas statue, sued the Postal Service in 2013 for copyright infringement. His lawyers pointed out that the replica is a distinct piece of art, with intentional variations from the original Statue of Liberty. In July 2018, a judge ordered the Postal Service to pay Davidson $3.5 million.

== Design ==
=== Exterior ===
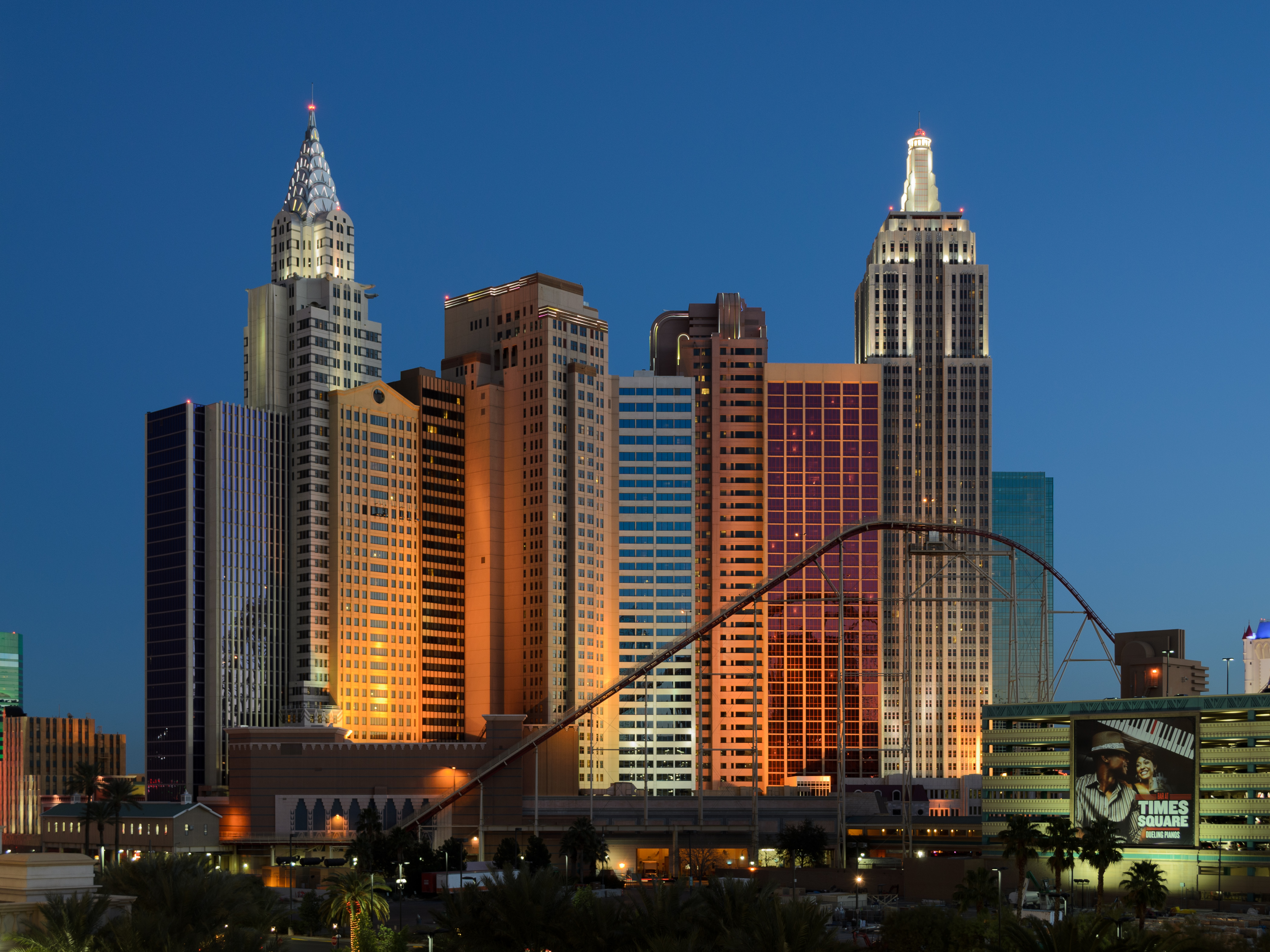
Rear view of the hotel tower

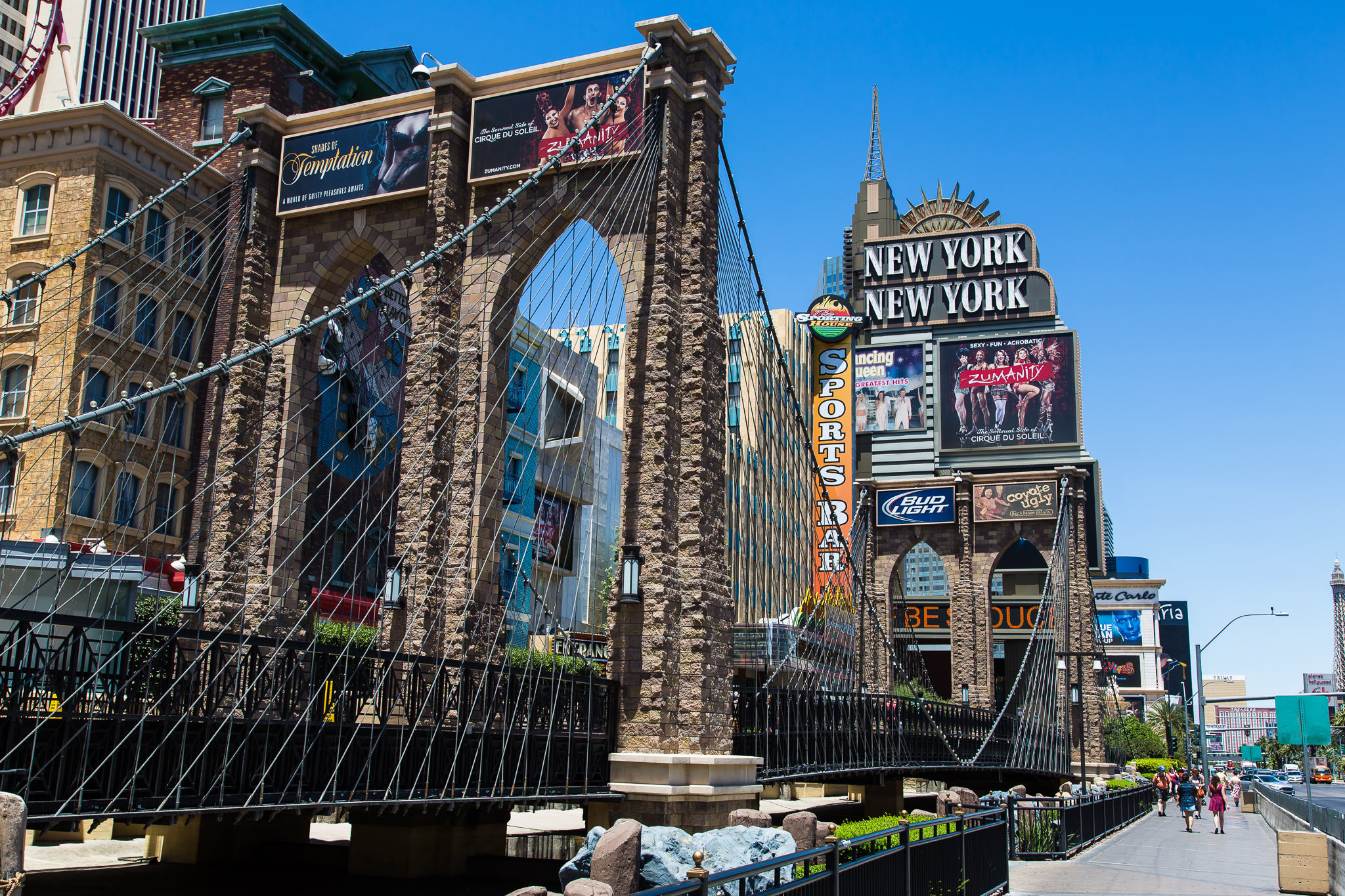
Brooklyn Bridge replica along Las Vegas Boulevard

The resort's exterior was designed by Neal Gaskin and Ilia Bezansky, who closely studied travel books and architectural drawings rather than visit New York City. However, the design firm Yates-Silverman Inc. did send a team to the city to study its skyline for eight weeks.

The hotel is contained in a single building, although its exterior is designed to represent various New York skyscrapers joined together. The buildings are roughly one-third the size of their real-life counterparts. The tallest building is a 47-story, 529-foot-tall (161 m) replica of the Empire State Building. This made New York-New York the tallest building in Nevada until the completion of Wynn Las Vegas in 2005; by comparison, the real Empire State Building is 102 stories tall.

Other buildings depicted in the hotel's skyline include the Chrysler Building, the Manhattan Municipal Building, the New Yorker Hotel, and The Century. The interior differs throughout the hotel to reflect the design of four skyscrapers: the Empire State, Chrysler, Century, and New Yorker Hotel buildings. The other skyscrapers depicted in the skyline are not represented within the interior. Although the skyline is meant to represent New York City during the 1940s, it does include several buildings completed after that period, such as Lever House (1952), the Seagram Building (1958), the CBS Building (1965), 55 Water Street (1972), and 550 Madison Avenue (1984).

The exterior features a 150-foot (46 m) replica of the Statue of Liberty, situated at the corner of Las Vegas Boulevard and Tropicana Avenue. A lagoon of fireboats sits at the base of the statue. The exterior also features an enlarged replica of the Soldiers and Sailors Monument; the Main Immigration Building on Ellis Island; and Grand Central Terminal. A 300-foot-long (91 m) replica of the Brooklyn Bridge runs along the property's façade on Las Vegas Boulevard.

New York-New York had been the only Strip resort without a roadside sign. Resort president Felix Rappaport said "the building has always been its own marquee". A $10 million sign, rising 222 feet (68 m), was eventually added in 2003. A 30-foot-long neon sign, located above the resort's Strip entrance, was dismantled in 2014, amid renovations. It was donated to the city's Neon Museum.

=== Interior ===
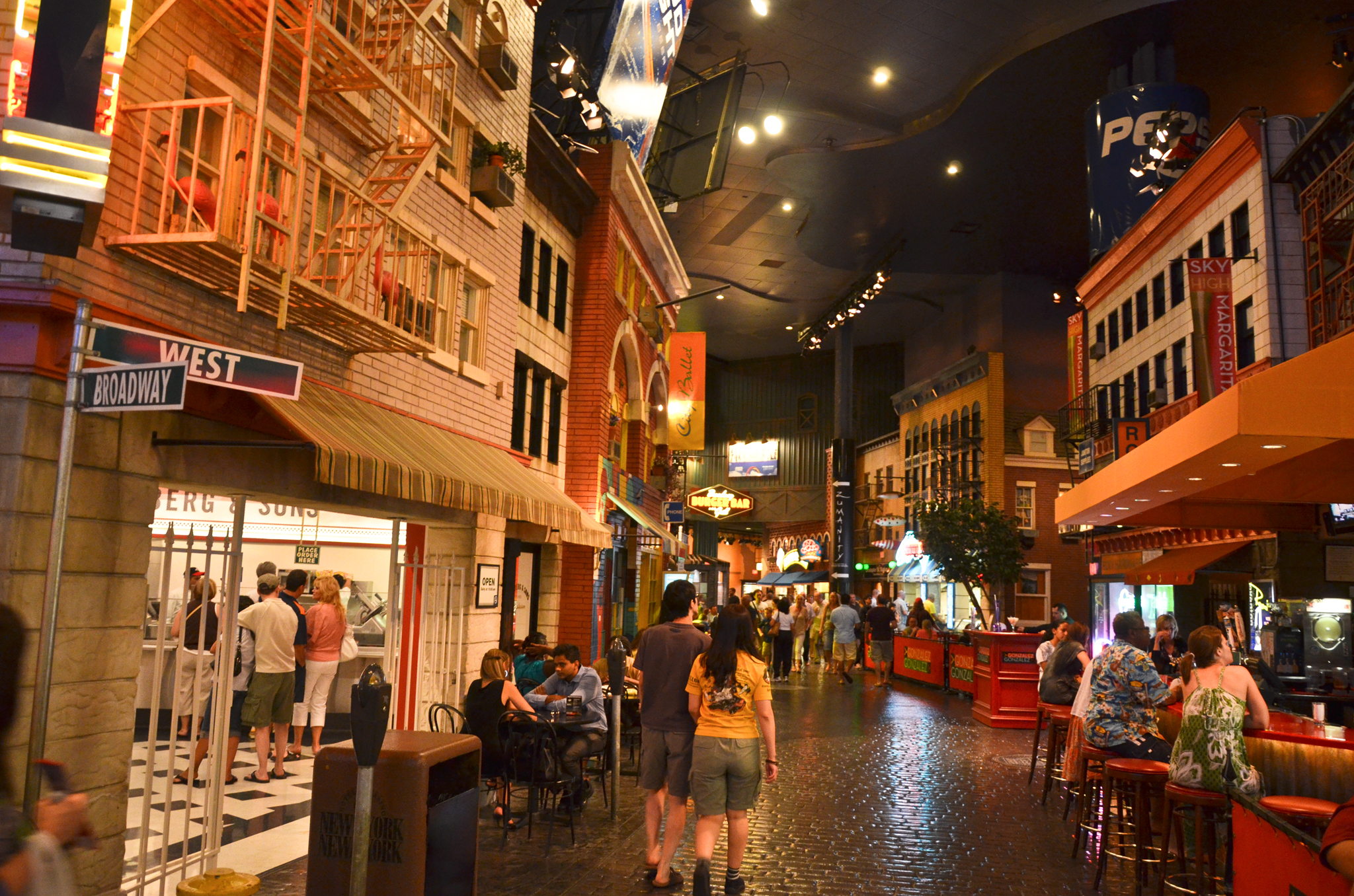
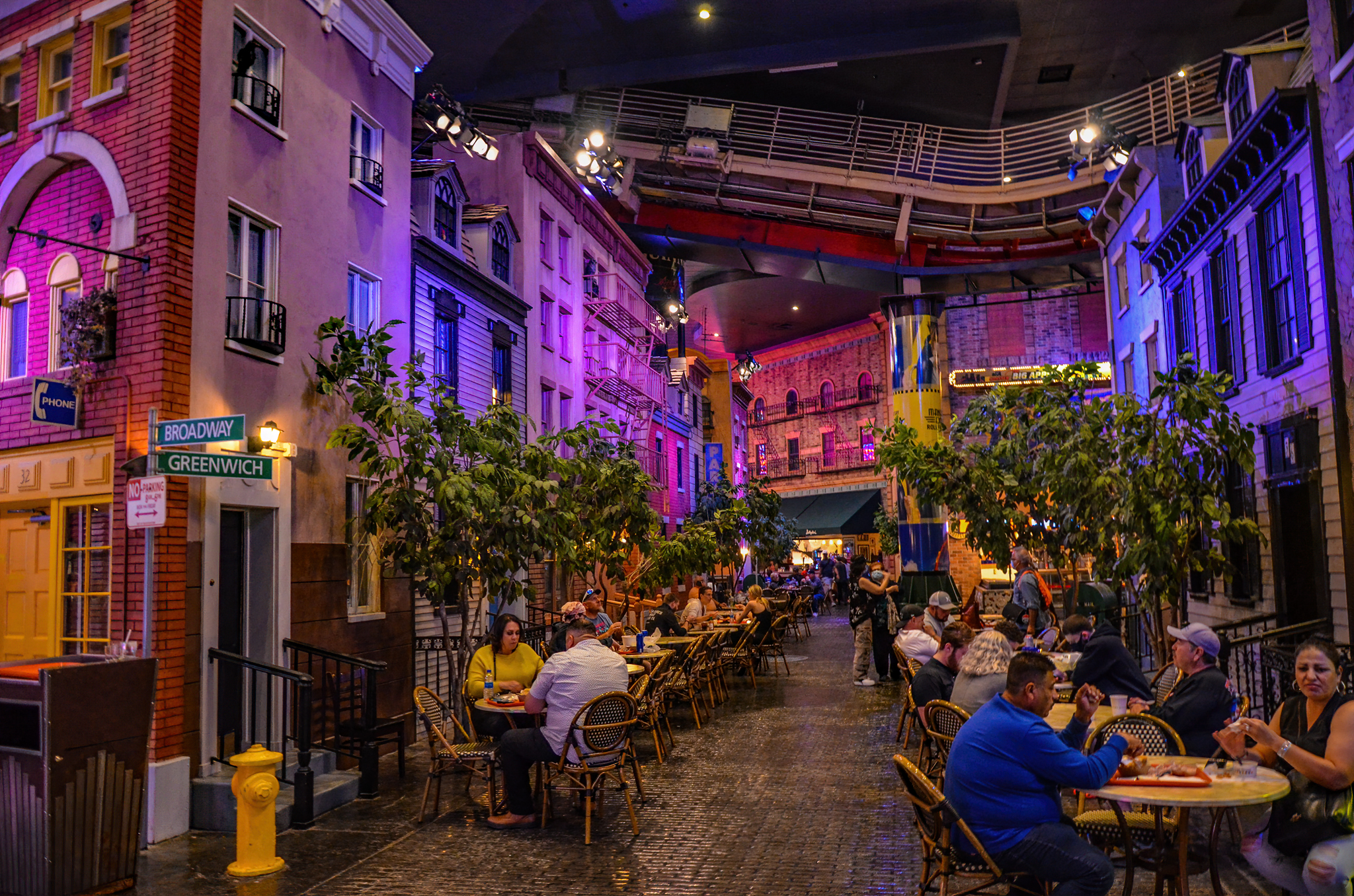
Food and dining areas resembling New York City

The interior was designed by Yates-Silverman Inc. The casino is meant to resemble various areas of New York, including Broadway, Central Park, Greenwich Village, Times Square, and Wall Street.

The central area of the casino floor was named Central Park and featured lamps, fake trees, and a large façade depicting the New York Stock Exchange Building. A high roller gaming area was designed to resemble the Rockefeller Center promenade. Cobblestone pathways lead past various eateries and retail shops with mock building façades. A food court, designed with architect Hugh Hardy as a consultant, was created to resemble Little Italy, Manhattan.

=== Reception ===
In the late 1990s, New York-New York won various accolades from the Las Vegas Review-Journal in its annual "Best of Las Vegas" awards. These included best Strip hotel and best hotel architecture (1997), best Las Vegas Architecture (1998), and coolest building in Las Vegas and best hotel theme (1999). It also won a Thea award in 1998 for Outstanding Achievement.

Architecture critic Paul Goldberger of The New York Times wrote, "On one level, this is the most ridiculous building imaginable, a cynical slap in the face at the notion that time and history carry some weight in the experience of place. On another level, it is an earnest, eager celebration of a world far away from Las Vegas, and it couldn't be more entertaining". Another critic, Benjamin Forgey of The Washington Post, wrote that the skyscraper replicas "are made, literally, out of Styrofoam (on a steel backing) – they don't exactly have the feel of bricks and mortar. More important, the scale is so out of whack that, despite its immense size, the building has the look and feel of a giant toy." Critic Nicolai Ouroussoff, writing for the Los Angeles Times, called New York-New York a "freakish apparition".

=== Lawsuits ===
The property's design led to several lawsuits. In 1996, the architecture firm Domingo Cambeiro sued Rogich, Advent and others affiliated with the project, claiming to have drawn up design plans for a mall project in 1993, known as New York CityCenter. The firm alleged similarities between the initial project and the final design of the resort, and said it was never compensated for its work. In 1998, a federal judge ruled against the firm, which subsequently filed a state lawsuit against Advent, alleging breach of contract and misappropriation of trade secrets. Domingo Cambeiro filed a third lawsuit later in 1998, to which Advent said, "Cambeiro has harassed me for several years with civil actions in an attempt to win a case that has no merit. Desperate people do desperate things".

After the resort's opening, the New York Stock Exchange (NYSE) filed a lawsuit over the use of the stylized interior façade depicting its NYSE Building. The NYSE also objected to the name of the casino's slot club, "New York $lot Exchange", as well as signs reading "NY$E" and "New York, New York Stock Exchange". The NYSE was concerned that its reputation would be damaged by the resort, stating that the NYSE façade and $lot Exchange "have the likelihood of deceiving or confusing the public ... and bastardizing the NYSE marks by making them subject to ridicule". A lawyer for the resort responded that, "New York-New York is full of parody and parody is protected speech". A court ruled in the resort's favor, although the NYSE appealed the decision. New York-New York eventually retired the "$lot Exchange" name.

Shortly after the opening, the United States Department of Justice found various areas of the resort – including the entrance, hotel rooms, and pedestrian bridges – to be non-compliant with the Americans with Disabilities Act of 1990. MGM subsequently sued 14 contractors and subcontractors over the faulty work.

== Features ==
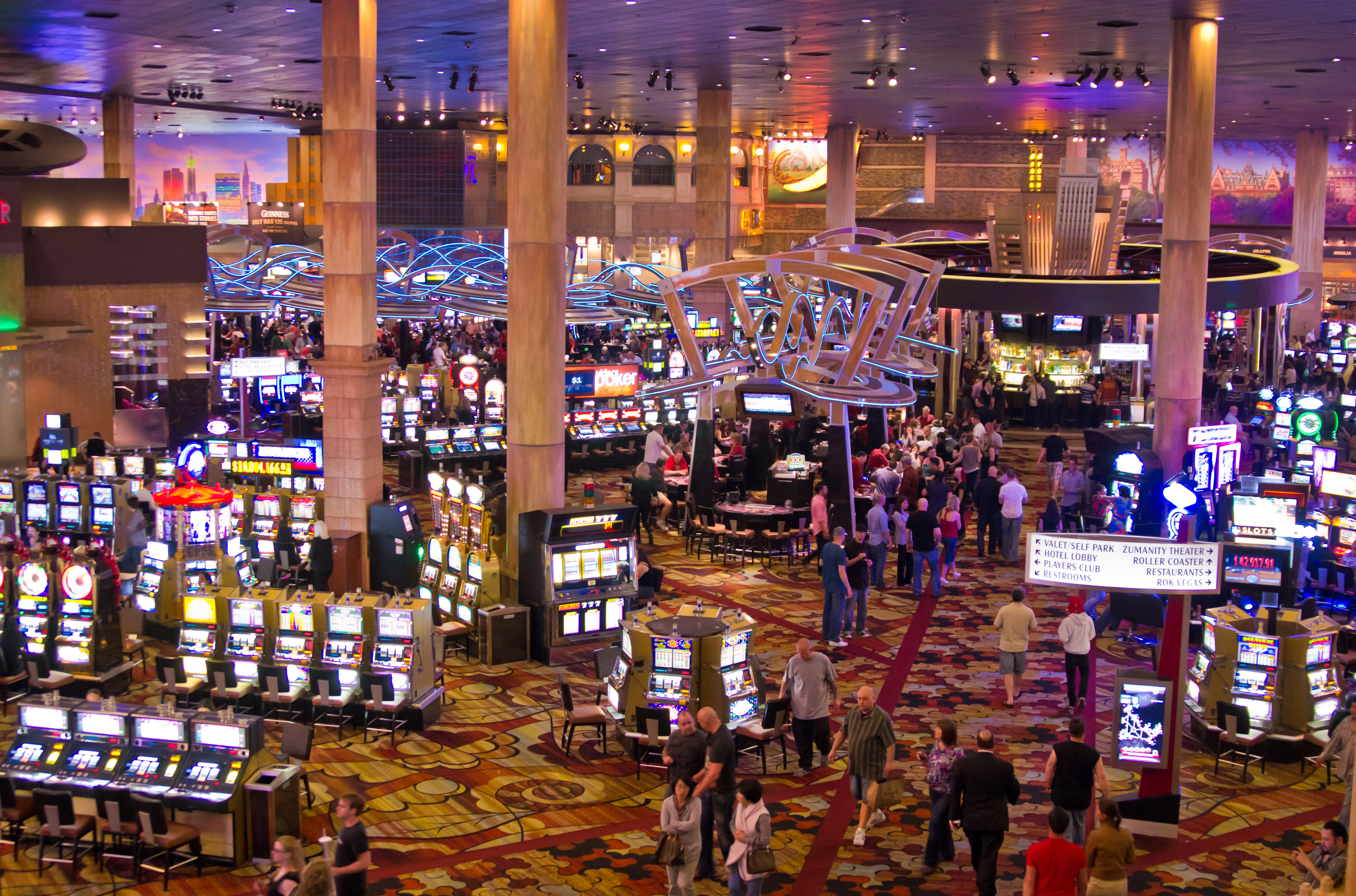
Casino interior in 2011

New York-New York includes a 51,765 sq ft (4,809.1 m^{2}) casino. At its opening, the casino measured 84,000 sq ft (7,800 m^{2}), and had 2,400 slot machines and 71 table games. The hotel contains 2,024 rooms. When the resort opened, it featured a second-floor, 28,000 sq ft (2,600 m^{2}) video game arcade which also included bumper cars and laser tag.

The property also included a cigar lounge known as Hamilton's, named after actor George Hamilton, majority owner of the lounge. Hamilton's provided a view overlooking the casino floor, and included a retail shop and a private back room known as the Club Car, resembling an upscale rail car. Hamilton's had capacity for 175 people, while the Club Car could hold an additional 30. The lounge closed in January 2000, amid poor business. The trend of cigar bars had died off, and the closure of the resort's wedding chapel was also cited, as Hamilton's typically hosted wedding receptions.

A renovation in 1999 added more meeting space and a restaurant, as well as upgrades for more than 300 rooms. A computerized valet parking system was implemented in 2001, to reduce wait times.

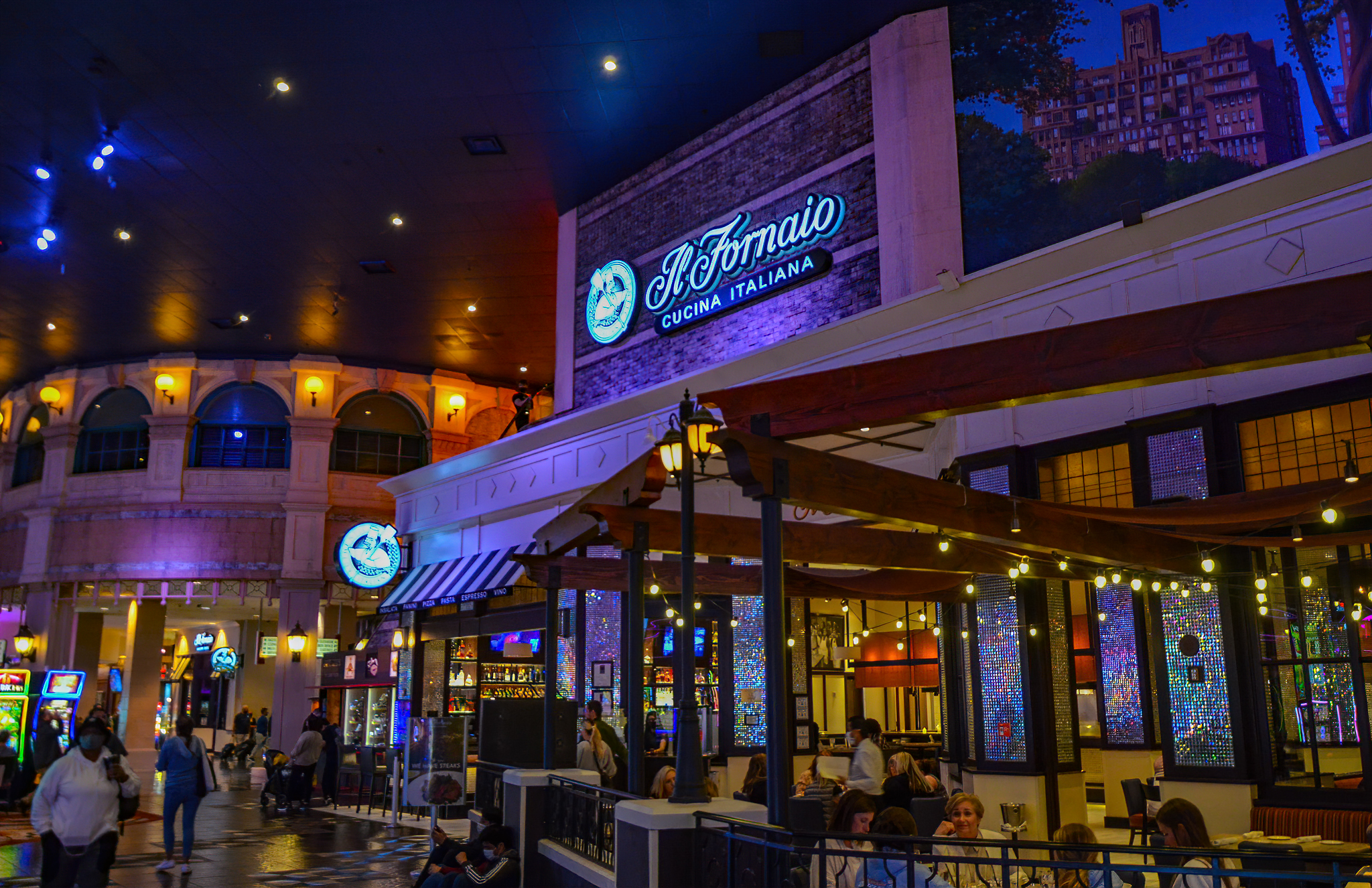
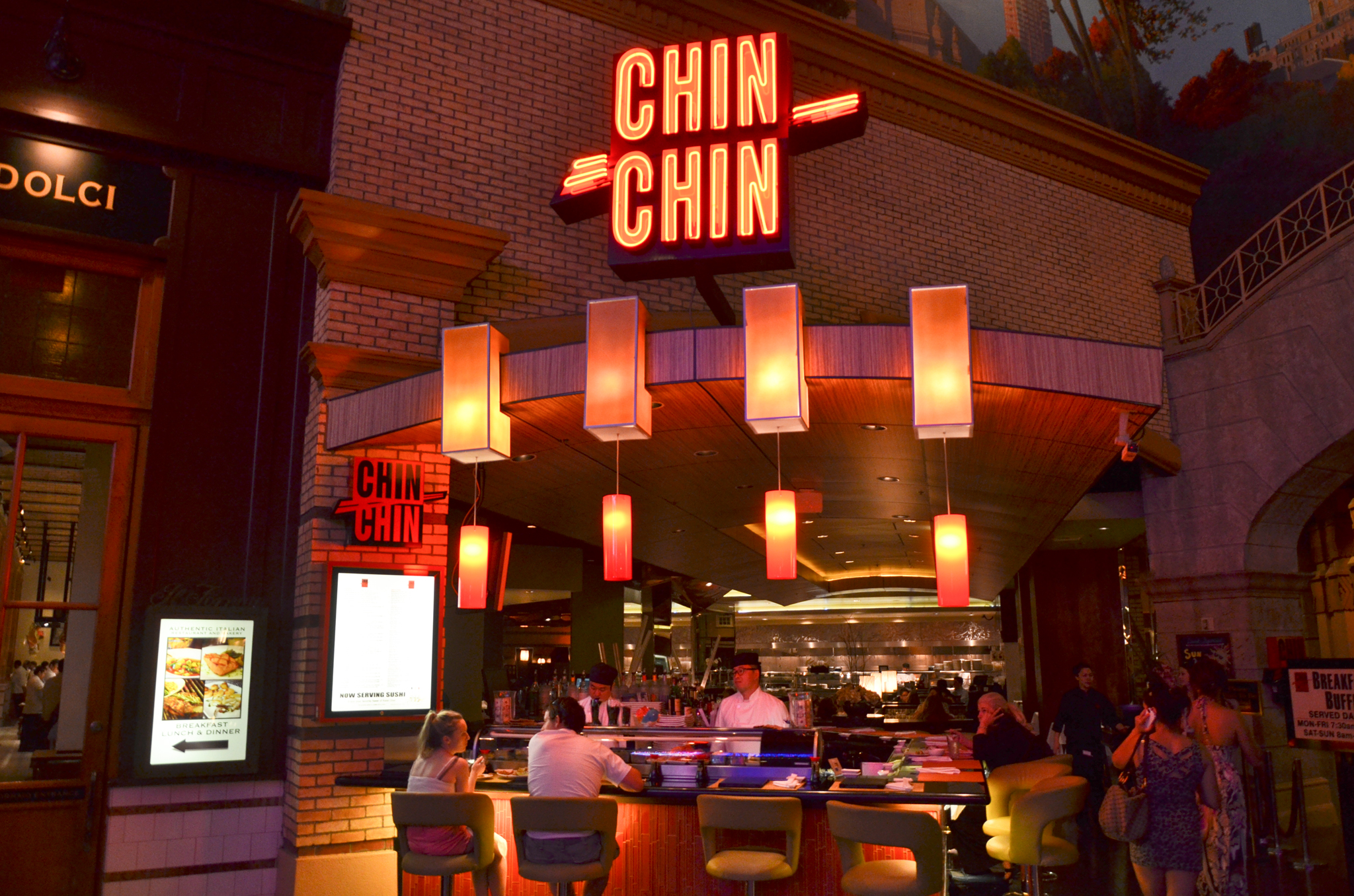
Il Fornaio and Chin Chin restaurants

New York-New York opened with four restaurants and a food court. Several of the same dining establishments were still in operation as of 2016. Among the original restaurants is Il Fornaio, an Italian eatery; and Chin Chin, an Asian restaurant. Both are part of California-based restaurant chains. Another original restaurant is Gallagher's Steak House. Unlike most casinos of the pre-COVID-19 era, New York-New York never had a buffet.

The Motown Cafe and Nightclub opened along with the resort, before closing in 2000. It was replaced a year later by an ESPN Zone. The casino also opened a Coyote Ugly Saloon later in 2001. Both were added to reinvigorate the resort, which had lost some business to newer properties such as Mandalay Bay and Paris Las Vegas. An Irish pub and restaurant, Nine Fine Irishman, opened in July 2003. It was the only Irish pub on the Strip.

A nightclub, known as Rok Vegas, opened in August 2008. It consisted of an oval-shaped space with an overhead television screen which wrapped around the room for 360-degree views. It could be used to show a variety of footage, such as concerts. The club played various types of music to attract a broad demographic. It had seating for 880 people. It featured a stage for performers, and also included an outdoor 2,000 sq ft (190 m^{2}) patio along the Las Vegas Strip, where DJ parties would take place. The club closed in 2012.

The ESPN Zone closed in 2010, and was replaced later that year by the Sporting House Bar and Grill. Like its predecessor, it was also focused on sports. The two-floor Sporting House included more than 130 televisions for sports viewing. It also had an arcade with 60 games. It closed in 2014. Shake Shack opened its first Las Vegas location at New York-New York later that year. A Tom's Urban restaurant with three bars was added in 2015. Both restaurants took the space formerly occupied by the Sporting House.

The 2013–14 façade renovation included the addition of a two-story Hershey's Chocolate World, which serves as the flagship store.

=== Big Apple Coaster ===
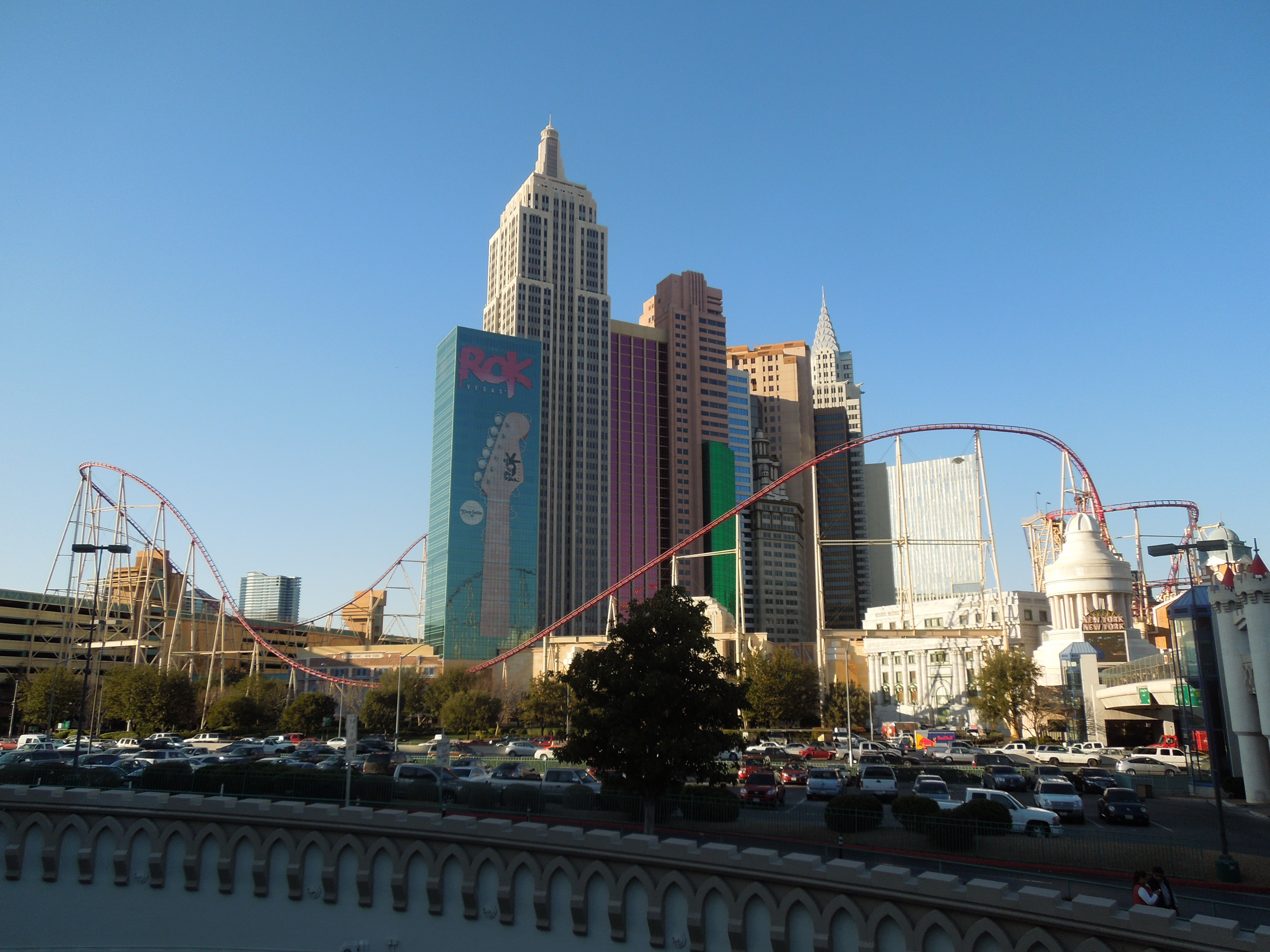
Roller coaster track

The Big Apple Coaster (formerly Manhattan Express and The Roller Coaster) travels through the property's interior and exterior along a 4,777 ft (1,456 m) track. The coaster is 203 ft (62 m) high, has a maximum drop of 144 ft (44 m), and reaches speeds up to 67 mph (108 km/h). The ride has undergone a variety of enhancements including the introduction of a magnetic braking system and new trains. The roller coaster has trains that resemble a traditional Checker Cab.

The roller coaster opened along with the resort, as the Manhattan Express. Built by TOGO, it was one of only two roller coasters in the world to feature a heartline roll and dive.

== Shows and entertainers ==
MADhattan, a $7.5 million show featuring street performers from New York City, was launched in June 1997. The show was produced by Kenneth Feld, who conceived it three years earlier. The show was reworked from a prior, short-lived revue in New York known as Street Songs. Singers and dancers were among the performers in MADhattan, and the sets were designed to portray areas of New York City. Initial ticket sales were poor, which prompted a fine-tuning of the show and a new advertising campaign. The show closed in May 1998, due to poor box-office results. It was replaced by Lord of the Dance, an Irish stepdancing show. It opened in July 1998, and ran for four years and 2,000 performances.

Comedian Rita Rudner began performing at the resort in April 2001, in a new venue dubbed the Cabaret Theatre. It was renovated in 2004, adding raked movie theater-style seating. Rudner concluded her show in 2006, selling out more than 600,000 tickets and grossing $35 million over the course of her run.

Zumanity, an adult-themed show by Cirque du Soleil, debuted at New York-New York in 2003, replacing Lord of the Dance. Zumanity was the third show from Cirque du Soleil to take up permanent residence in the Las Vegas Valley. It was the first Cirque show to be directed primarily toward adult audiences. It was the only permanent Cirque show to allow admission only to those over 18 years of age. The theater was arranged as a cabaret, with sofas and bar stools complementing the standard theater seats. Zumanity became a long-running success, hosting more than 7,700 performances. The final performance took place on March 14, 2020, with the show closing due to the COVID-19 pandemic. Later that year, Cirque du Soleil announced that the closure would be permanent.

In 2012, producer David King leased the former space of Rok Vegas and opened it as the Broadway Theater, a 200-seat venue for several shows produced by him. Among them was Dancing Queen, which featured songs by ABBA. The show closed in July 2013, along with the Broadway Theater, which was demolished as part of the resort's façade renovation.

For a brief period in 2021, ventriloquist Terry Fator entertained in the former Zumanity theater. Later that year, he relocated his show to the resort's Liberty Loft, an event space overlooking the sportsbook.

Mad Apple, a new show by Cirque du Soleil, opened on May 26, 2022. It features a variety of performers, including singers and comedians. It is hosted in the former Zumanity theater, which seats 1,200 people.

== Gallery ==
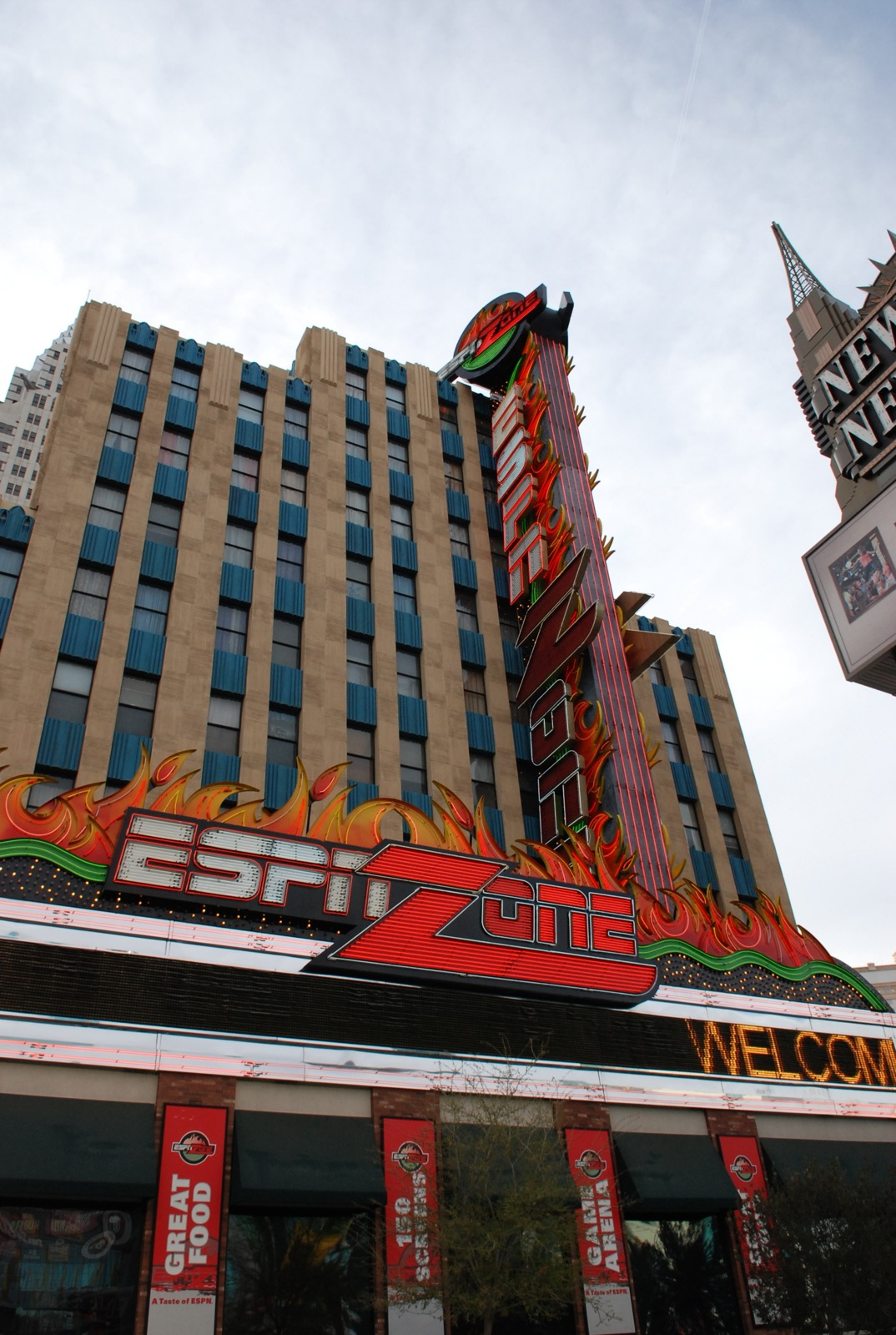
ESPN Zone in 2007

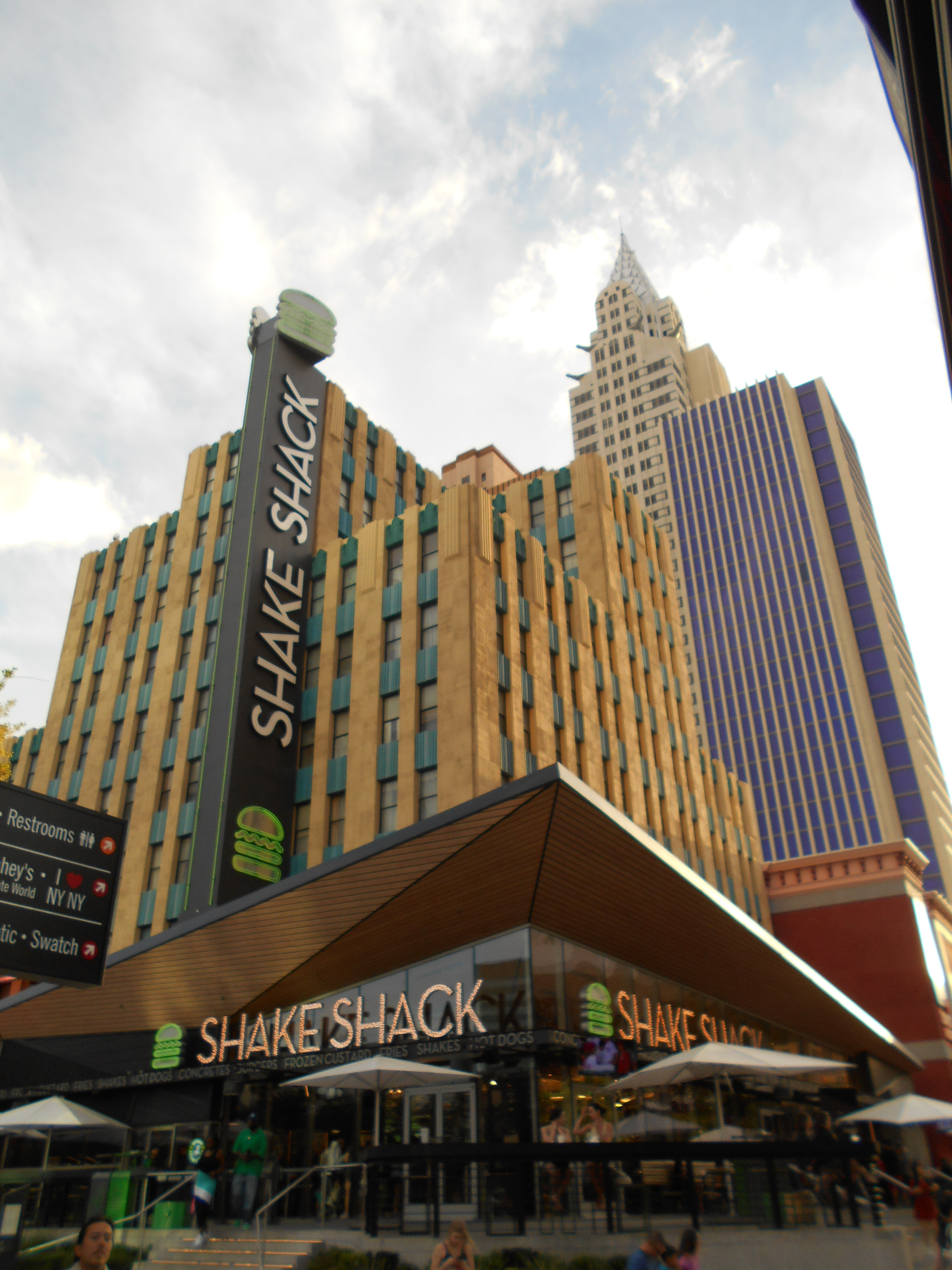
Shake Shack in 2017

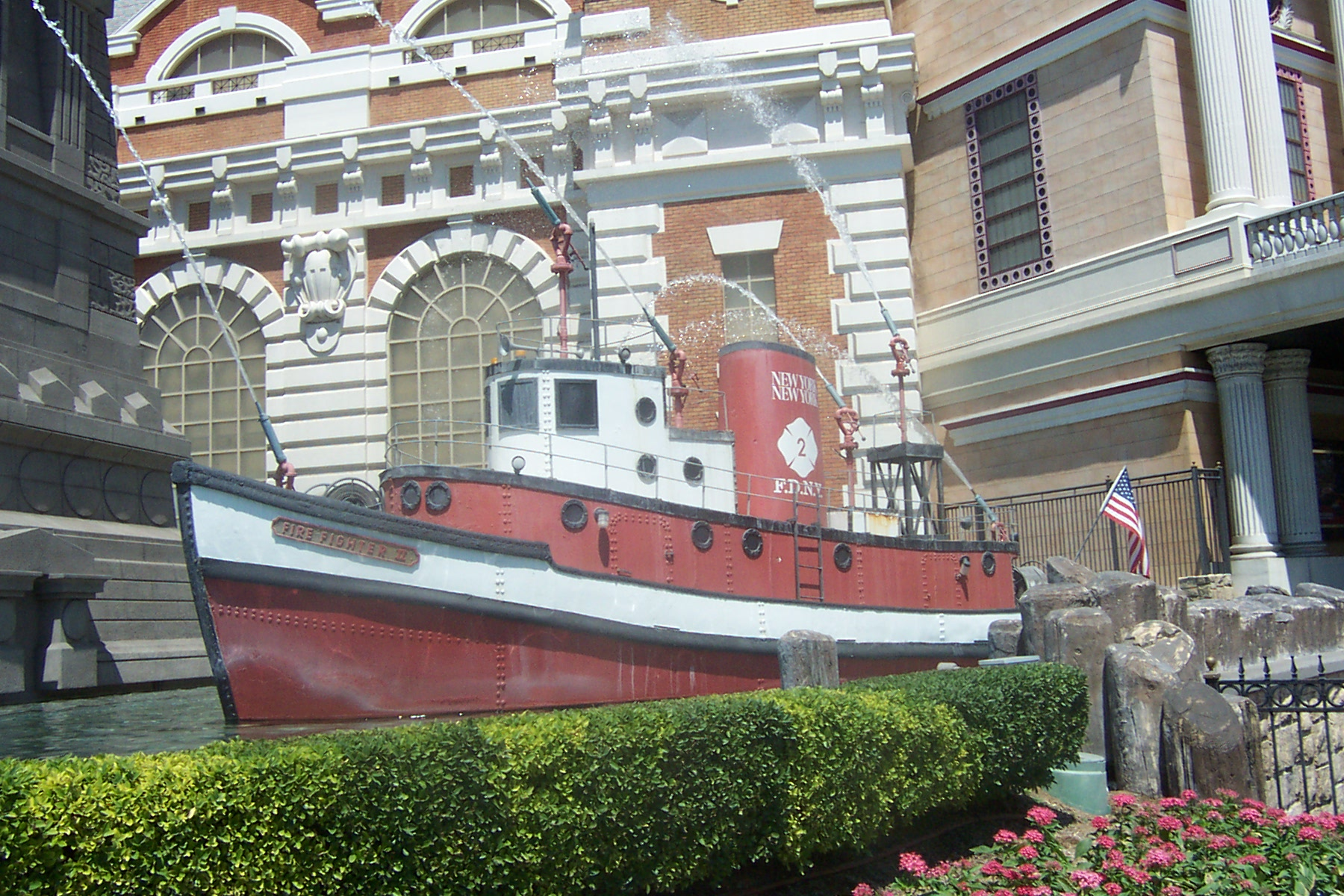
Fountain resembling a New York City Fire Department fireboat, 2006

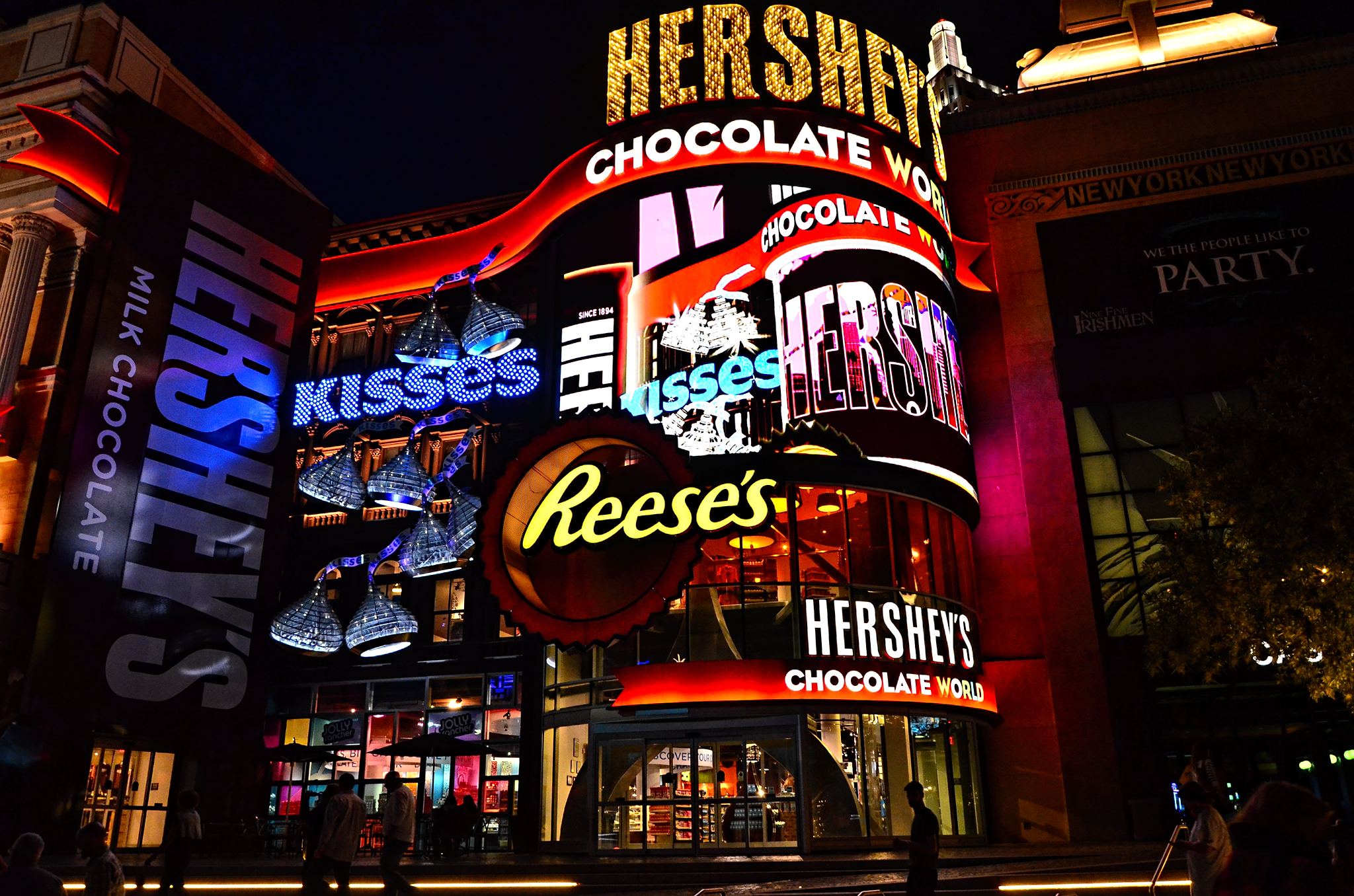
Hershey's Chocolate World

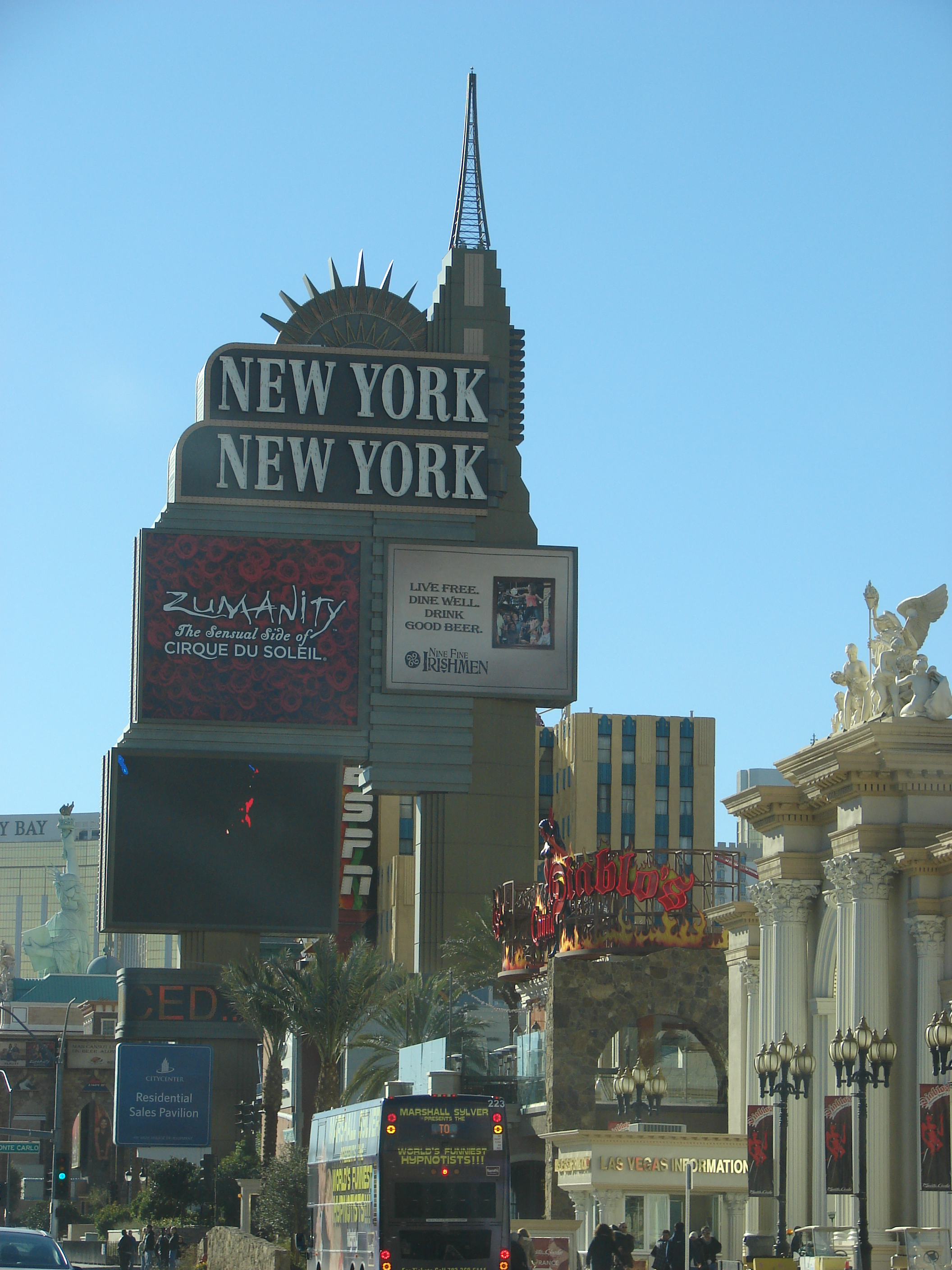
Roadside sign installed in 2003

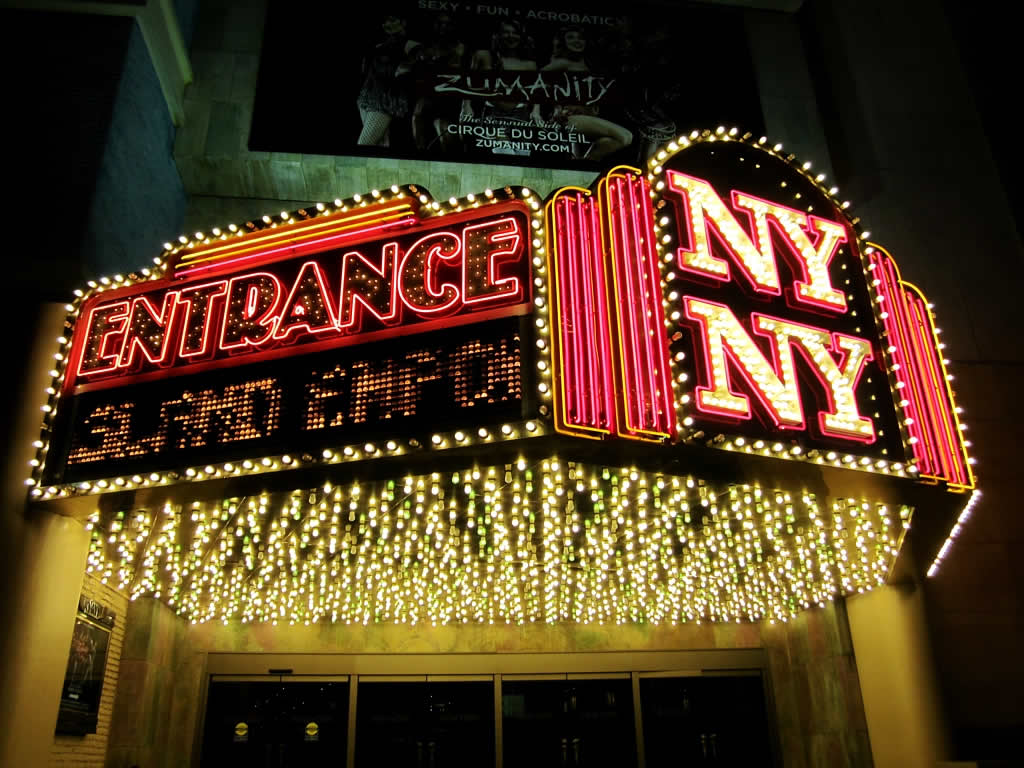
Entrance sign, donated to the Neon Museum in 2014.

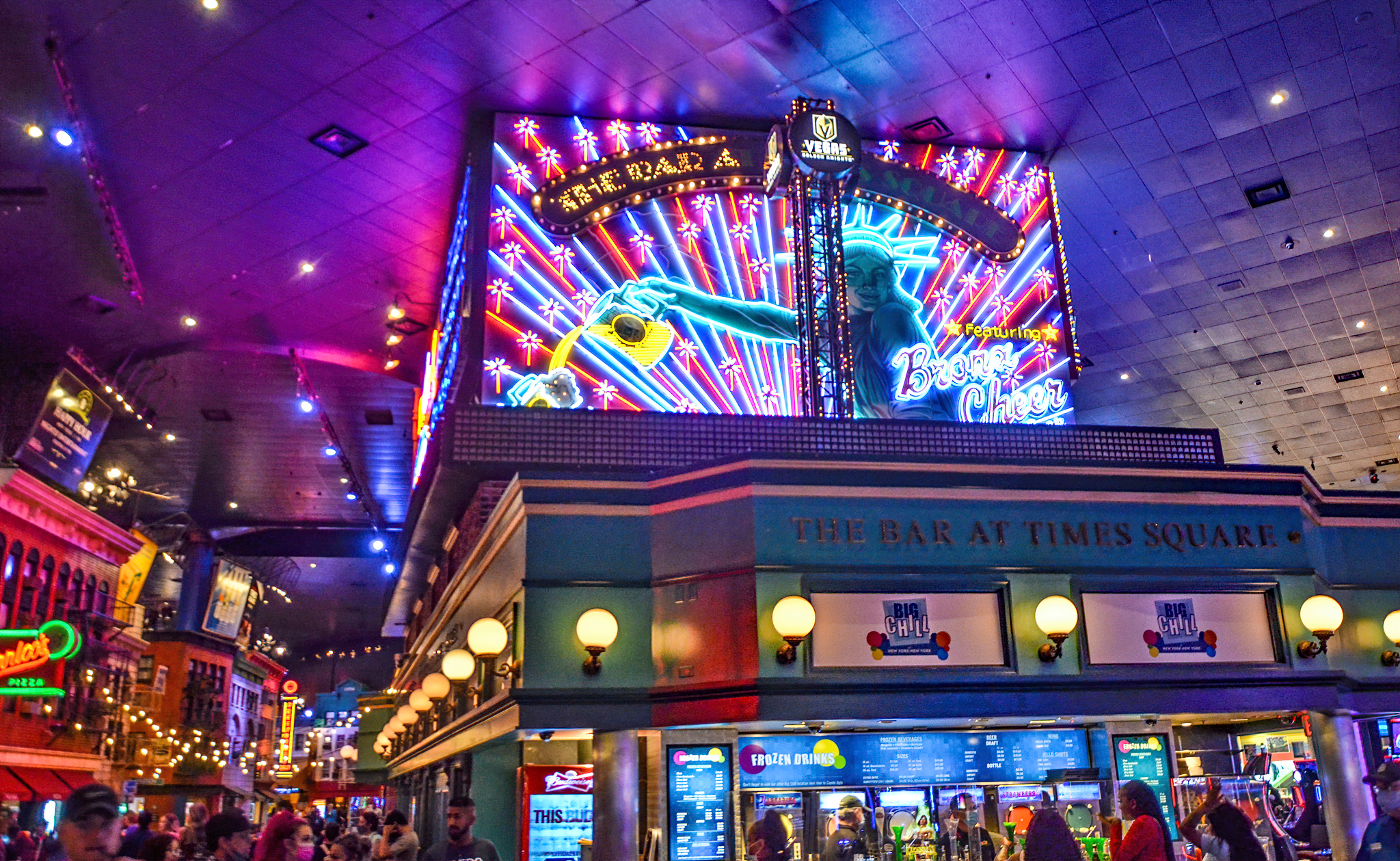
The Bar at Times Square

== See also ==
- List of integrated resorts
