= Primm, Nevada =

Unincorporated town in Nevada, US

- Unincorporated community
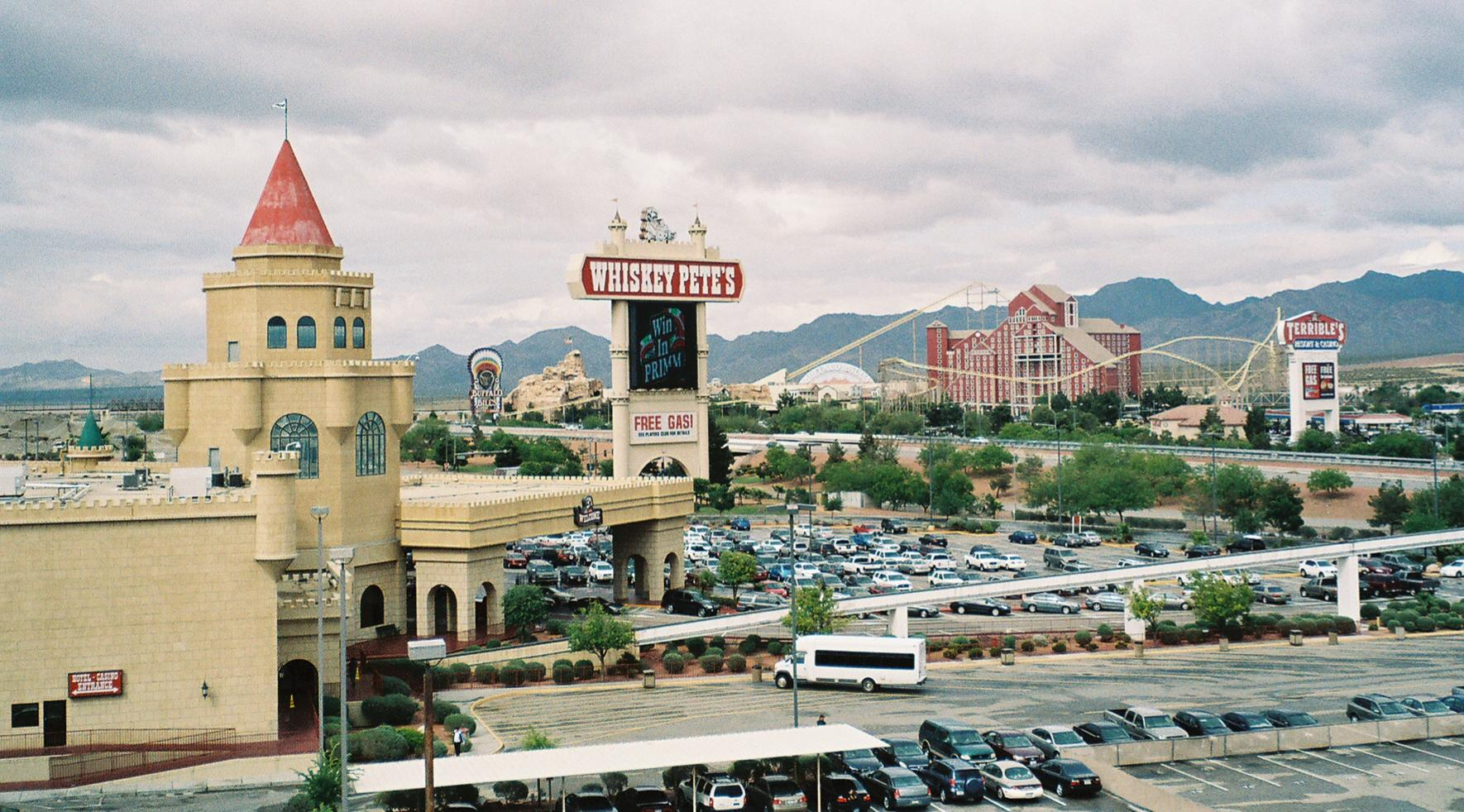
- Primm off Interstate 15 (2008)

- Location within Nevada Location within the United States
- Coordinates: 35°36′46″N 115°23′25″W
- Country: United States
- State: Nevada
- County: Clark
- Founded: 1920s
- Founder: Pete MacIntyre
- Named for: Ernest Jay Primm
- Elevation: 2,618 ft (798 m)

Population (2020)
  - Total: 646
- Time zone: UTC-8 (PST)
  - Summer (DST): UTC-7 (PDT)
- ZIP code: 89019
- Area codes: 702 and 725
- GNIS feature ID: 849405

Primm (formerly known as State Line) is an unincorporated town in Clark County, Nevada, United States, primarily notable for its position straddling Interstate 15 at the Nevada–California border. It sits on Ivanpah Dry Lake, which extends to the north and south of town.

Primm was initially known as State Line and started as a small motel and coffee shop built by Ernest Primm (1901–1981) in the 1950s. Over the years, Primm grew, with Gary Primm, Ernest's son, expanding the area by building casino hotels. In 1996, the town was officially renamed Primm in honor of its founder and to avoid confusion with Stateline in northern Nevada.

The community's economy has been in decline. From a high of three casinos (one closed 2024, one closed 2025), a wholesale outlets mall (nearly vacant by 2023) and family-friendly attractions, by 2026 the last functioning casino, the Primm Valley Resort remains. The casino attracted gamblers from Southern California wanting to stop before reaching Las Vegas 40 miles (64 km) to the north, or as a last chance to gamble before leaving Nevada. Most of Primm's residents were employees of the casino. A store located just over the California state line from Primm sells California State Lottery tickets and games (including the multi-state Mega Millions and Powerball games) mainly to residents of Nevada, whose constitution prohibits a state lottery.

While not a census-designated place, the 2000 census population for the community is 436. A Clark County Comprehensive Planning Department estimate placed the population at 284 on July 1, 2006, apparently using different boundaries for the area. In a December 5, 2007 article in the Las Vegas Review-Journal, Primm's population is listed as around 1,132.

For 2020, Census Block 2156, Census Tract 57.03 and Block 2155, Census Tract 57.03 showed a total population of 650.

== History ==
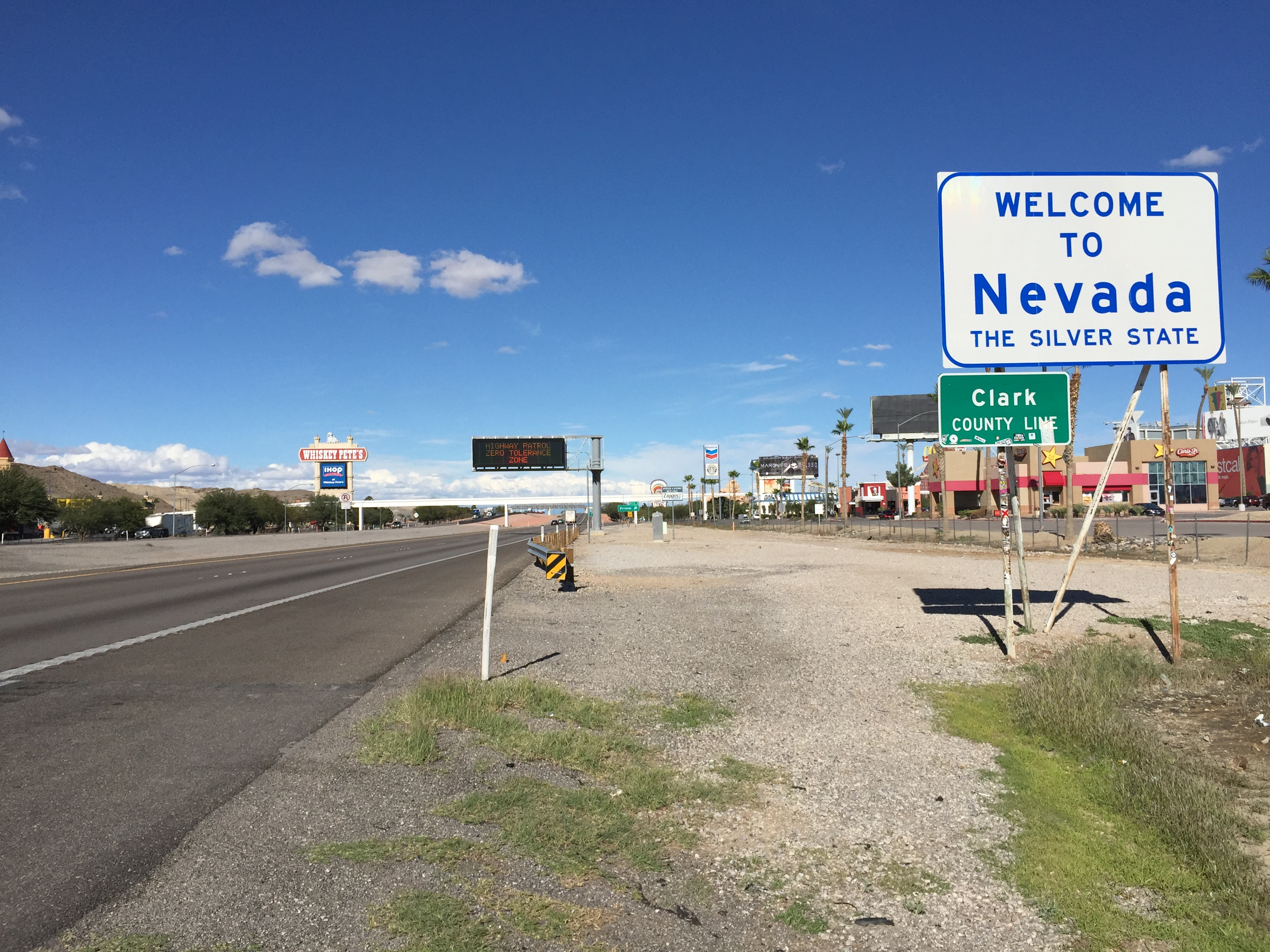
Primm as seen from the California-Nevada border (2015)

In the 1920s, Pete MacIntyre owned a gas station at the state line, on a road later designated U.S. Route 91. MacIntyre’s business was reportedly unsuccessful, and he eventually resorted to bootlegging alcohol. Primm historians remember him as “Whiskey Pete”. According to local legend, MacIntyre expressed his desire to be buried in a vertical coffin with his body in a standing posture, along with a bottle of moonshine in his hands to “drink” as he “watched over” the region. Whiskey Pete's unmarked grave was accidentally exhumed while workers were building a connecting bridge from Whiskey Pete's to Buffalo Bill's Hotel and Casino (on the other side of I-15). The remains were apparently relocated and are now said to be buried in one of the caves where he produced his moonshine.

Dale Hamilton was the proprietor of State Line from the early 1950s to the early 1970s, as U.S. 91 was upgraded to today’s Interstate 15. After obtaining the property, Hamilton built a Chevron station, as well as a small-slots casino and a café/lunch counter. He also opened a basic automotive garage and maintained a towing service. He called the business simply "State Line Bar:Slots". Hamilton also campaigned legislators in Carson City to grant an Interstate 15 interchange to the site, which was not originally planned.

Starting in 1994, Primm featured family-friendly attractions like the Adventure Canyon Log Flume and the Desperado roller coaster, which was once the world's tallest. However, by the 2000s, Primm's energy waned. In 1998, MGM Grand acquired the casinos from the Primm family, and later in 2007, they were sold to Affinity Gaming.

In 2004, under the then-ownership of MGM Mirage, 52 apartment buildings were constructed in Primm to serve as more convenient housing for employees of the three casinos. The name of the apartment complex is the Desert Oasis, and its current location is at 355 E. Primm Boulevard.

Prizm Outlets, formerly known as the Fashion Outlets of Las Vegas, is a 370,000-square-foot mall that, as of 2023, is almost empty. It was sold in 2021 for $400,000.

Whiskey Pete's closed in 2024 while Buffalo Bill's closed in 2025. This left the Primm Valley Resort as the only casino in Primm. On June 16, 2026, Terrible’s, a gas station chain that services slots and casinos through its affiliate JETT Gaming, reached a deal with the Primm family to take over operations of the Primm Valley Resort and company-owned apartments from Affinity Gaming. Terrible's is owned by the Herbst family, who founded Affinity Gaming as Herbst Gaming before losing ownership in Chapter 11 proceedings in 2009.

== Climate ==
Primm's climate is a hot desert climate (Köppen climate classification: BWh).

Climate data for Primm, Nevada (2002–2014)
Month	Jan	Feb	Mar	Apr	May	Jun	Jul	Aug	Sep	Oct	Nov	Dec	Year
Mean daily maximum °F (°C)	57 (14)	61 (16)	69 (21)	77 (25)	88 (31)	100 (38)	105 (41)	101 (38)	94 (34)	79 (26)	66 (19)	55 (13)	79 (26)
Daily mean °F (°C)	47 (8)	50 (10)	58 (14)	65 (18)	76 (24)	87 (31)	93 (34)	89 (32)	82 (28)	68 (20)	56 (13)	46 (8)	68 (20)
Mean daily minimum °F (°C)	37 (3)	39 (4)	47 (8)	53 (12)	63 (17)	73 (23)	80 (27)	77 (25)	69 (21)	56 (13)	45 (7)	36 (2)	56 (14)

== Events ==
In 1996, SCORE International started hosting an annual off-road race known as Terrible's SCORE Primm 300. The Primm 300 is one in a series of annual off-road races that include the Baja 1000, Baja 500, San Felipe 250 and the Laughlin Desert Challenge.

In 1997, the 20th World's Strongest Man competition was held in Primm.

Primm was the end location for the 2004 DARPA Grand Challenge. Additionally, it was the starting and ending location for the 2005 DARPA Grand Challenge. The $2 million prize was won by a team from Stanford University.

The Stateline Supermoto Challenge also takes place at Buffalo Bill's casino every year attracting pro and amateur supermoto racers from around the country.

Primm is the location of the Mint 400, the American off-road race.

Primm is the location of WORCS, (World Off Road Championship) of two to four rounds of Motocross, UTV, Side by Side and ATV off-road racing.

Primm is also where Simon Lizotte set the Flying Disc Distance World Record at 263.2 m (863.5 ft) on October 25, 2014. He used a 157-gram Blizzard Champion Boss from Innova Champion Discs.

== Transportation ==
Primm, Nevada is located along Interstate 15, midway between Las Vegas, Nevada and Baker, California.

The nearest commercial airport is Harry Reid International Airport in Las Vegas, Nevada. The proposed Southern Nevada Supplemental Airport would be built just north of Primm.

Primm hosted an Amtrak Thruway bus stop at Whiskey Pete's Resort until late 2017, operating bi-directionally with service between Bakersfield, California, and Las Vegas, Nevada.

== Bonnie and Clyde Getaway Car ==
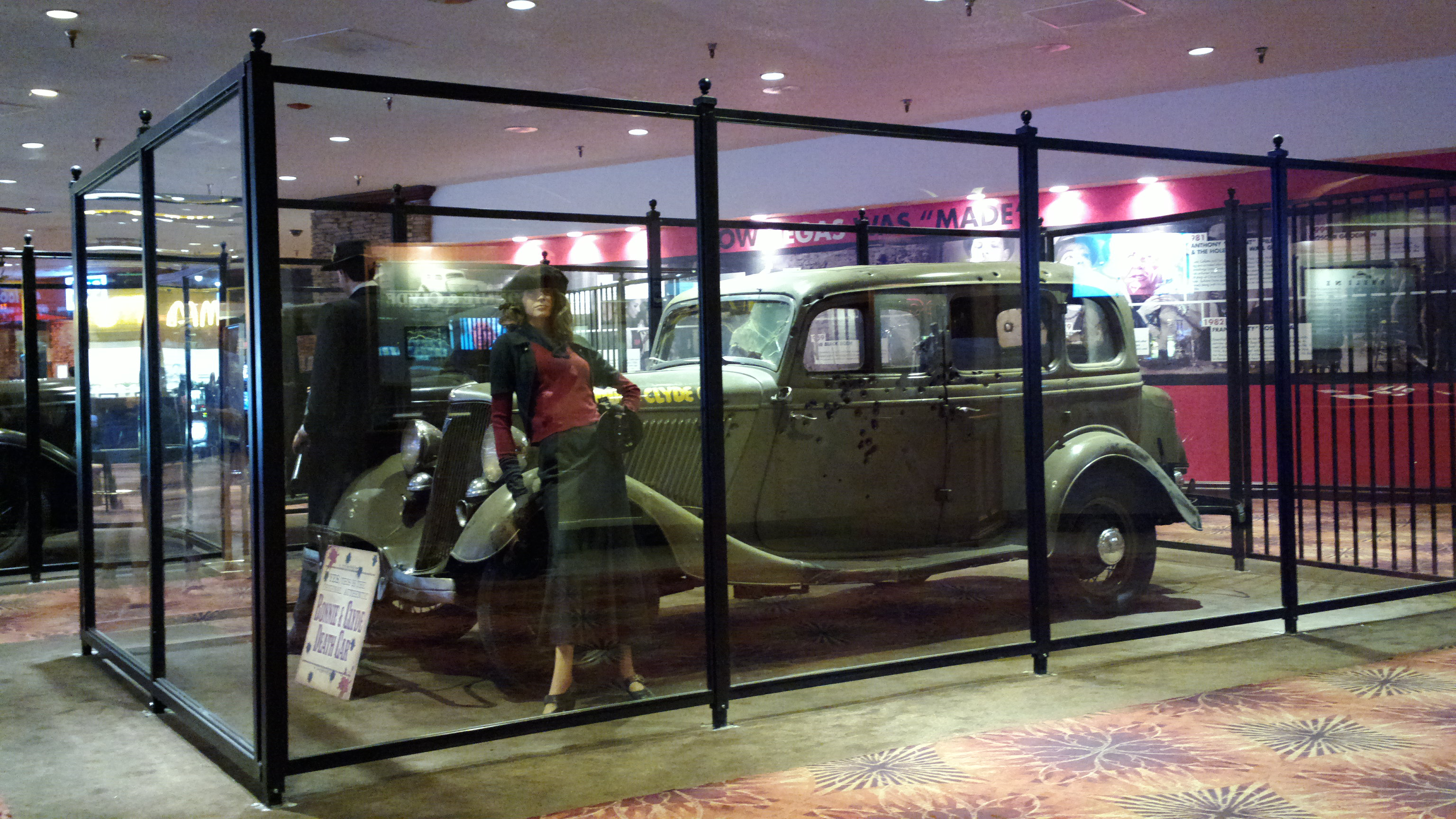
The Bonnie and Clyde death car on display (2013)

Primm is home to the Bonnie and Clyde Getaway Car, the vehicle that Bonnie Parker and Clyde Barrow were in when they were shot and killed after being pursued by the police. It was previously located inside Whiskey Pete's and Buffalo Bill’s but was moved to the Primm Valley Resort following the closure of those hotels.

The couple were shot and killed in Gibsland, Louisiana, on May 23, 1934, around 2,400 km (1,500 miles) from Primm.

== In popular culture ==
Primm appears in the 2010 video game Fallout: New Vegas and is designed to be one of the first few places the player visits. In game, the town is depicted as being taken over by escaped convicts, who have killed the local sheriff.
