= Terrible Herbst =

Gas station company in Nevada, United States

Terrible Herbst, Inc.
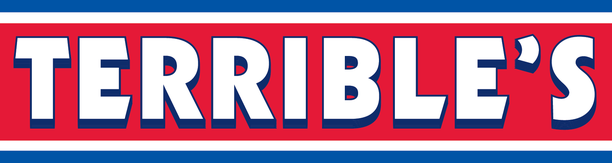

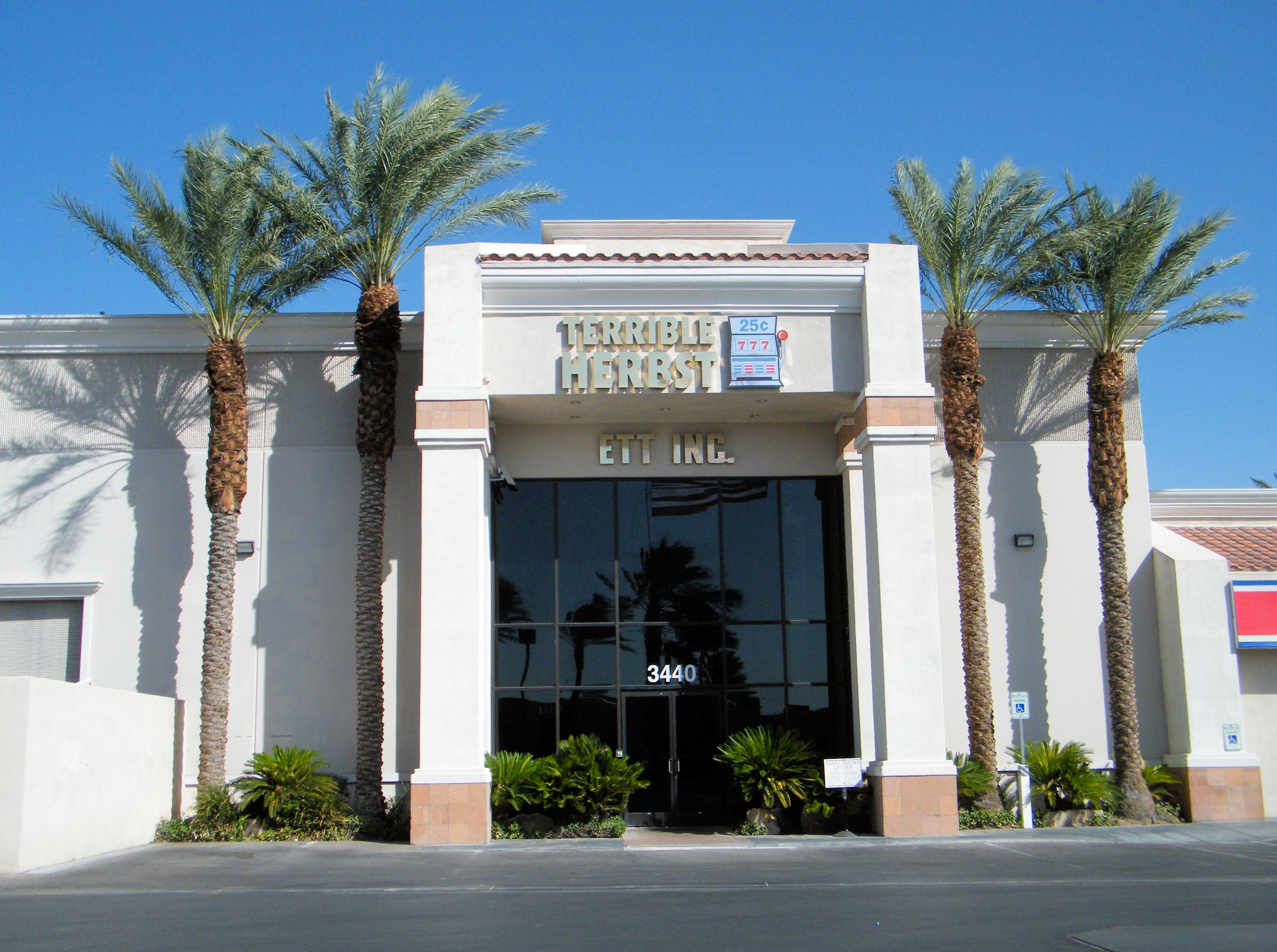
- Terrible Herbst headquarters
- Trade name: Terrible's
- Type: Private
- Industry: Service station
- Founded: 1959; 67 years ago
- Headquarters: 3440 West Russell Road, Paradise, Nevada, U.S.
- Number of locations: 176 (2022)
- Area served: Nevada, California, Utah and Arizona
- Key people: Ed Herbst (CEO)
- Products: Gasoline; Convenience stores
- Revenue: ▲US$395.3 million (2022)
- Number of employees: 2,100 (2022)
- Website: www.terribles.com

Terrible Herbst or Terrible Herbst Oil Company is an American privately held gas station company based in Paradise, Nevada, United States.

The company operates gas stations in Nevada, California, Utah and Arizona.

== History ==
The company's roots go back to a single Chicago, Illinois, gas station in 1938. The owner of Martin Oil, Edward R. Herbst, was credited with becoming "the P. T. Barnum of gasoline" by engaging in unusual marketing strategies, undercutting the competition with low prices, and pioneering the convenience store model. According to his son, Jerry, each time the elder Herbst would open a new gas station, competitors would bemoan the move: "Here comes that terrible Herbst", inspiring the chain's nickname. Alternatively, the name is traced to a specific incident that occurred in the late 1940s as Herbst was moving to the western United States; when applying for a business license in Cheyenne, Wyoming, one of the city councilmembers (who owned a competing gas station) was overheard saying "If we let that terrible Herbst in, we'll all go under!"

Ed (1910–66) and his wife Lorraine (1909–73) had two children: Dolly (1932–2001), a model who married actor Wild Bill Elliott and Jerry (1938–2018), a businessman. The site of the Herbst family's original Las Vegas-area home is now part of the MGM Grand Las Vegas resort property. Jerry graduated from the University of Southern California in 1959 and returned to Las Vegas to help with the family business, rebranding it as the Terrible Herbst Oil Co. that year. Both Dolly and Jerry had executive positions in Terrible's. Jerry is credited with the design for the company's mascot, known alternatively as "Mr. Terrible" or "Bad Guy", a cowboy wearing a black hat and a handlebar moustache. Jerry himself was credited as being "the best bad guy of the West".

The Terrible Herbst company is run by Jerry's sons, Tim, Troy, and Ed Herbst. The company's headquarters is located at 5195 Las Vegas Blvd South, Las Vegas, Nevada 89119. Its stations are typically of the Chevron brand. In 2018, the company opened Terrible's Road House in Jean, billed as the largest Chevron in the world, with 96 gas pumps, 60 restroom stalls, and a 50,000 ft^{2} (4,600 m^{2}) convenience store.

== Affiliates ==
=== Herbst Gaming ===
Herbst Gaming was a slot route operator and casino company owned by Jerry Herbst's three sons. It was formed in 1987 to service slot machines in the Terrible Herbst stores. In 1997, it began opening and acquiring full-fledged casinos, many of which were branded as Terrible's casinos. It operated two casinos in Pahrump before opening a third casino (on the site of the old Continental Hotel and Casino) in Las Vegas in 2000. However, a ban on smoking and weak gasoline prices hurt the company's profits. The company went into Chapter 11 bankruptcy in 2009, and the Herbst family gave up its ownership stake. Herbst Gaming subsequently changed its name to Affinity Gaming and dropped its use of the Terrible's name.

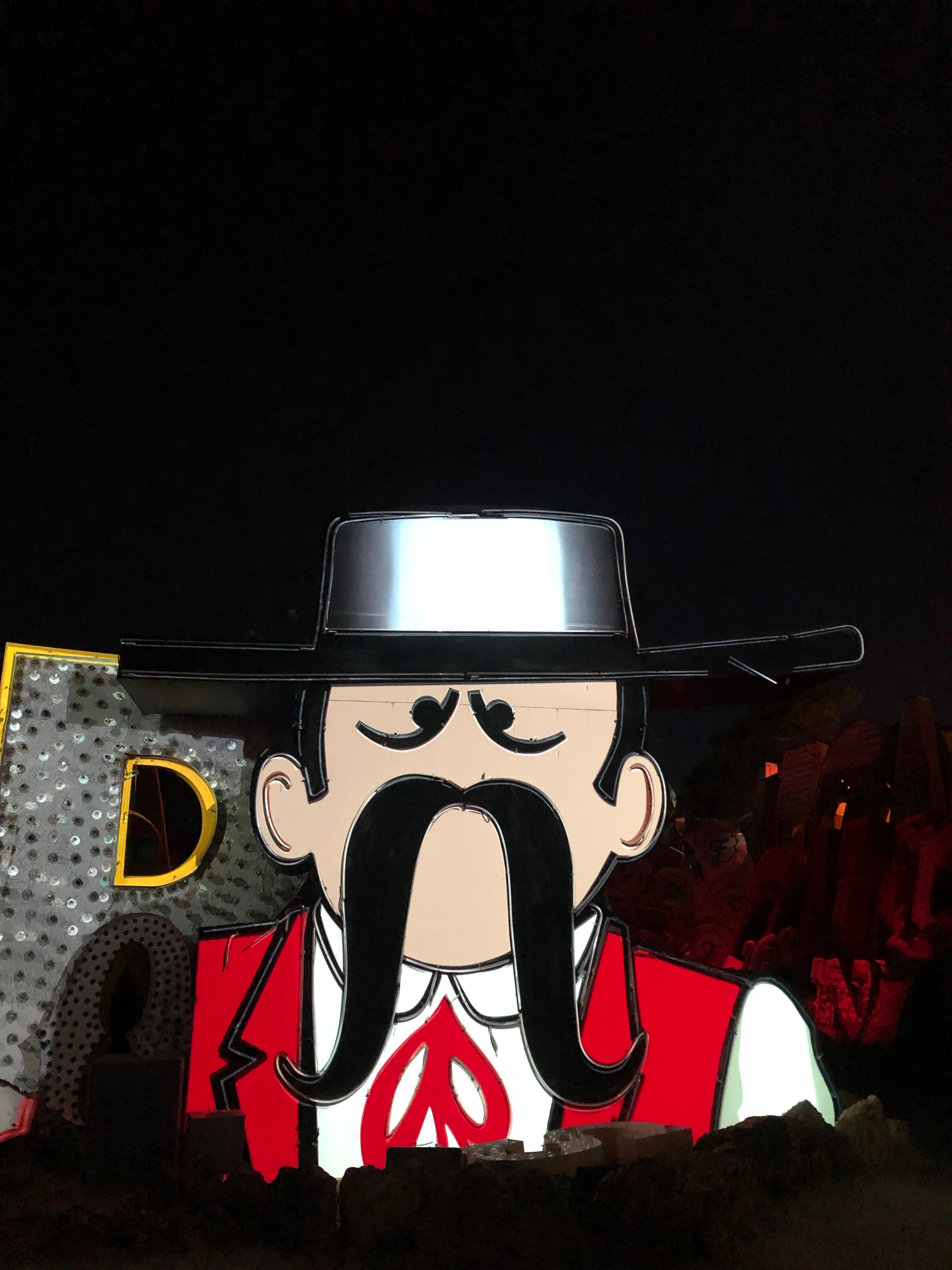
Terrible Herbst mascot sign at the Neon Museum

=== JETT Gaming ===
JETT Gaming is a slot route operator and casino company formed by Jerry Herbst in 2011, after the family lost its ownership of Herbst Gaming. In 2012, JETT bought out the slot route contracts for Terrible Herbst stores from the former Herbst Gaming, and also acquired the Terrible's casino in Searchlight, Nevada. In 2015, JETT bought the Gold Strike Hotel and Gambling Hall in Jean, Nevada from MGM Resorts International for $12 million; the property was later rebranded as Terrible's Hotel & Casino. The company also acquired a second casino in Searchlight, the Searchlight Nugget, in 2015. Terrible's Hotel & Casino in Jean announced its indefinite closure on November 22, 2021.

=== Terrible Herbst Motorsports ===
- 2004 SCORE Laughlin Desert Challenge
- 2006 Las Vegas Terrible's Cup II Pit Crew Challenge winner
- 2007 Las Vegas Terrible's Cup II Pit Crew Challenge winner
