= List of airports in Clark County, Nevada =

Clark County, Nevada operates several airports:

- Harry Reid International Airport, Paradise (IATA: LAS, ICAO: KLAS) - The primary commercial airport for the Las Vegas area
- North Las Vegas Airport, North Las Vegas (IATA: VGT, ICAO: KVGT)
- Henderson Executive Airport, Henderson (IATA: HSH, ICAO: KHND)
- Perkins Field, Overton (FAA LID: U08)
- Jean Sport Aviation Center, Jean (FAA LID: 0L7)
- Ivanpah Valley Airport, Jean - planned future relief airport for McCarran
- Mesquite Airport, Mesquite (IATA: MFH)

== Other airports ==
- Boulder City Municipal Airport, (IATA: BLD, ICAO: KBLD )
- Echo Bay Airport, Overton (FAA LID: 0L9)
- Kidwell Airport, Cal-Nev-Ari (FAA LID: 1L4)
- Searchlight Airport, Searchlight (FAA LID: 1L3)
- Sky Ranch Airport, Sandy Valley (FAA LID: 3L2)

== Past airports ==
- Anderson Field - the first airport to serve Las Vegas

== Heliports ==
- Boulder City-Eldorado Substation Heliport - (FAA LID: NV37)
- Henderson-Car Country Heliport - (FAA LID: NV10)
- Henderson-Lake Las Vegas Heliport - (FAA LID: 1NV2)
- Henderson-St Rose Dominican Hospital Heliport - (FAA LID: NV25)
- Las Vegas-City Hall Complex Heliport - (FAA LID: NV52)
- Las Vegas-Claude I Howard Heliport - (FAA LID: NV63)
- Las Vegas-Circus Circus Heliport - (FAA LID: NV48)
- Las Vegas-Excalibur Hotel Casino Heliport - (FAA LID: NV29)
- Las Vegas-Gilbert Development Corp Heliport - (FAA LID: NV61)
- Las Vegas-Hacienda Hotel Heliport - (FAA LID: NV49)
- Las Vegas-KLAS Channel 8 Heliport - (FAA LID: NV38)
- Las Vegas-Las Vegas Helicopters Heliport - (FAA LID: NV03)
- Las Vegas-Maverick Heliport - (FAA LID: NV99)
- Las Vegas-Nevada Fish Game Reg III Headquarters Heliport - (FAA LID: NV32)
- Las Vegas-Summerlin Medical Center Heliport - (FAA LID: 0NV1)
- Las Vegas-University Medical Center Southern Nevada Heliport - (FAA LID: NV34)
- Las Vegas-Valley Hospital Medical Center Heliport - (FAA LID: NV53)
- Laughlin-Sce Mohave Generating Station Heliport - (FAA LID: NV75)
- Mesquite-Vista Del Monte Lot 55 Heliport - (ICAO: 2NV3)
- Sandy Valley-Sky Ranch Heliport - (FAA LID: NV21)
