= Transportation in Las Vegas =

Coordinates: 36.171379°N 115.145691°W

Overview
- Locale: Las Vegas and the surrounding region in Nevada, California, Arizona and Utah
- Transit type: Bus, car, taxi, airport, pedestrian, monorail, high-speed rail (planned) and rapid transit (proposed)
- Daily ridership: Nearly 5 million monthly (2011)

Operation
- Operators: RTC Southern Nevada, Las Vegas Monorail, Clark County Department of Aviation, and private operators

Transportation in the Las Vegas Valley serves the cities of Las Vegas, North Las Vegas, and Henderson. The street grid is primarily arranged along north–south and east–west axes. While most residents rely on cars, there is a network of bus routes serving much of Clark County. The Las Vegas Valley public transportation system favors the Las Vegas Strip.

== History ==
=== Railroad industry ===
The Los Angeles and Salt Lake Railroad was the first to lay track in the Las Vegas Valley. By 1905, the Los Angeles and Salt Lake Railroad had connected Salt Lake City to Southern California through Las Vegas. The railroad provided freight and passenger service to Las Vegas until it was acquired by the Union Pacific Railroad in 1921.

In 1936, the Union Pacific Railroad built the City of Los Angeles between Chicago and Los Angeles. This train ran until it was combined with the City of San Francisco in 1960. In 1956, the City of Las Vegas connected Los Angeles and Las Vegas. The train was renamed the Las Vegas Holiday Special and ran until it was discontinued in 1968. Amtrak operated the Las Vegas Limited between Las Vegas and Los Angeles for three months in 1976. A new service, the Desert Wind, was built in 1979.

The Desert Wind operated on Union Pacific tracks between Salt Lake City Denver & Rio Grande Depot and Los Angeles Union Station with a stop at the Las Vegas Amtrak station. The Desert Wind faced fierce competition from airlines and the interstate highway system. This, along with frequent delays caused by UP freight trains, made the Desert Wind unpopular. It was discontinued in 1997 and replaced by Amtrak Thruway.

=== Current service and future plans ===
Amtrak Thruway serves Las Vegas with a bus stop at Harry Reid International and a bus stop in Downtown Las Vegas. Las Vegas is one of the largest metro areas in the US without passenger rail service.

In 2005, DesertXpress Enterprises LLC was formed in an attempt to restore passenger rail service to Las Vegas. They officially released their plan to construct a high-speed route to SoCal later that year. In 2009, after years of environmental reports determining right of way and debating which federal agency would have regulatory authority, Secretary of Transportation Ray LaHood announced the official recognition of DesertXpress as a high-speed route.

In 2018, the project was taken over by the Fortress Investment Group and renamed as the Brightline West project. The planned high-speed route will be 185 mi (298 km) long, connecting Las Vegas to Southern California near Los Angeles.

== Airports ==
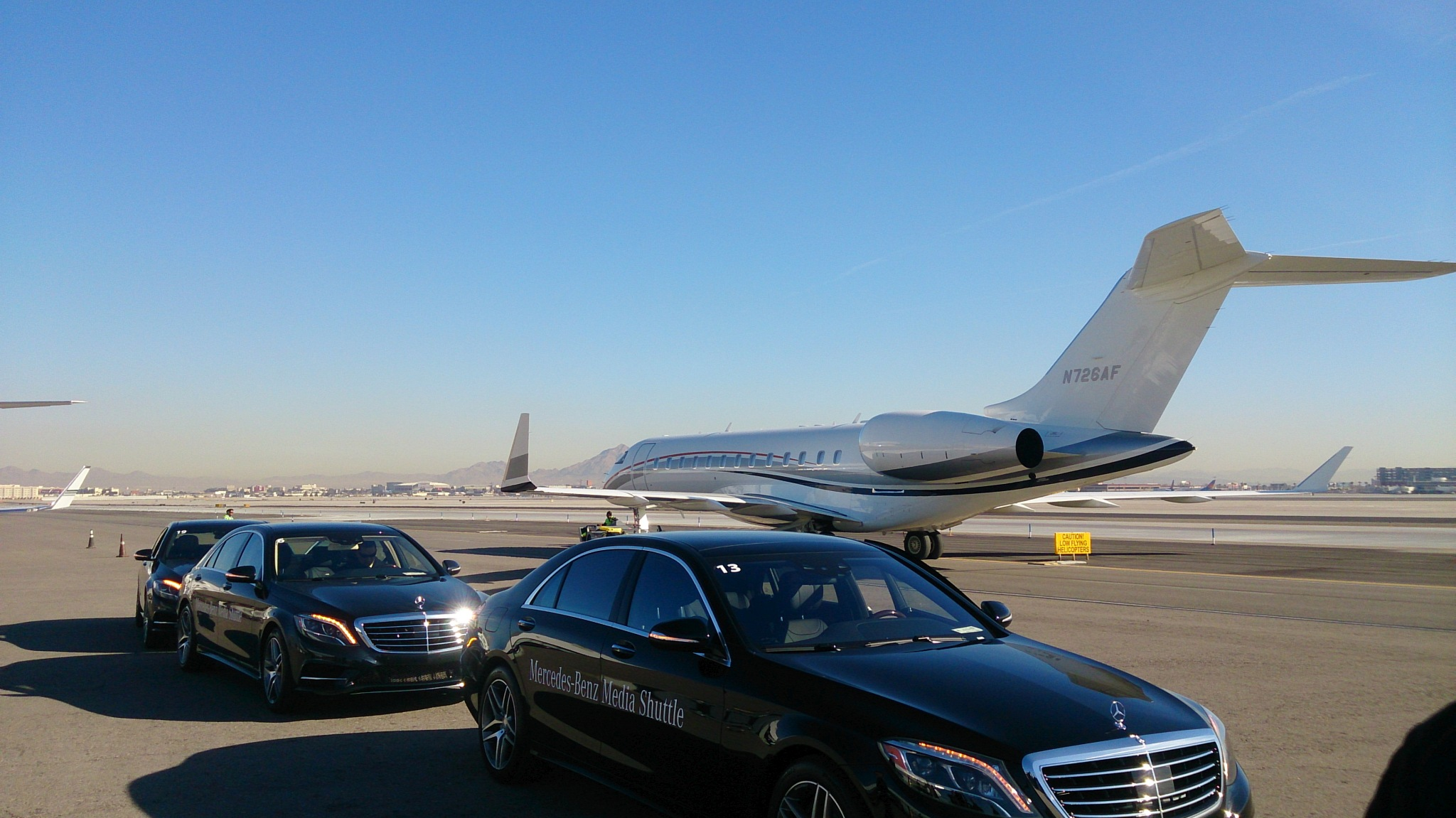
Harry Reid International Airport provides private and public aviation services to the city.

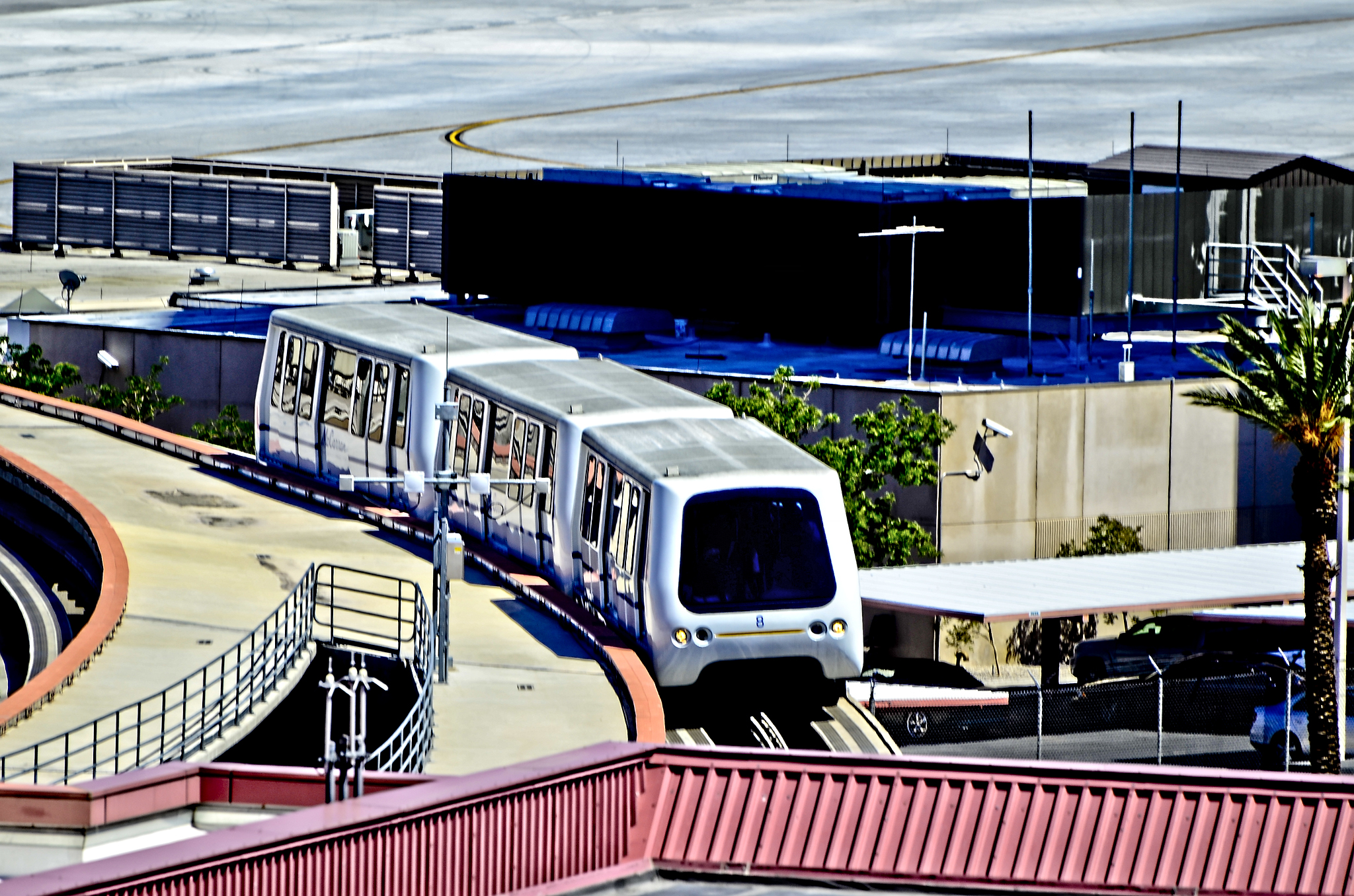
Harry Reid International Airport Automated People Movers in 2011

The Harry Reid International Airport is five miles from downtown Las Vegas, and is the only commercial airport serving the Las Vegas Valley. It consists of two active terminals and services both domestic and international flights. In January 2026, Clark County officials announced plans to go ahead with a previously approved plan to modernize and reorganize the airport. The plans aim to streamline passenger navigation and increase capacity throughout the airport.

Transportation to and from the airport is limited to automobiles, taxis, shuttles, and buses. In late 2007, Clark County commissioners permitted the Las Vegas Monorail Company for an extension to Harry Reid International Terminal One, although funding had yet to be determined. The extension was met with negativity by limousine and taxi companies that had previously been the major transportation providers for arriving tourists. By 2011, funding was in doubt and the Las Vegas Monorail Company had yet to begin construction.

The airport operates a free shuttle service between Terminal 1 and Terminal 3 on Level 0.

Harry Reid International Airport Automated People Movers are three separate lines: the Green Line connecting the Main Terminal to the C Gate Concourse, the Blue Line connecting the Main Terminal to the D Gate Concourse, and the Red Line connecting the D Gates Concourse to Terminal 3.

A consolidated rental car facility opened in April 2007, located roughly 3 miles (4.8 km) from the airport. Courtesy shuttles run between the airport and the rental car facility. South of the airport is the bus center, South Strip Transit Terminal (SSTT), on Gilespie Street.

=== Non-commercial airports ===
Other airports in the Las Vegas Valley include the North Las Vegas Airport, a non-commercial airport used mostly by hobbyist pilots and small charter airlines, and Henderson Executive Airport, a non-commercial airport used mostly by business jets and small charter airlines.

=== Helicopters ===
Las Vegas has a number of heliports and helicopter tour operators. There are tours to the Las Vegas Strip, Red Rock Canyon, Hoover Dam, the Grand Canyon, Fortification Hill, and Las Vegas Valley. Some have landings at the Grand Canyon Helicopter Eagle Point Rim. Eagle Point is on the Hualapai Reservation, not in the Grand Canyon National Park. Maverick Helicopters and Papillon Grand Canyon Helicopters each have terminals on the west side of Harry Reid Airport. There are other terminals on the Strip, at the North Las Vegas Airport, Boulder City Municipal Airport, in Henderson, and at the Henderson Executive Airport.

=== Planned ===
A second, larger commercial airport is planned. Southern Nevada Supplemental Airport, also called Ivanpah Valley Airport, is a developing relief airport between Primm and Sloan. It will be constructed on 6,500 acres (2,630 hectares) of undeveloped land previously owned by the United States Department of the Interior's Bureau of Land Management. However, as of August 2011, due to the economic downturn and lack of demand increase, the airport has been put on temporary hold and is still in the design phase. Completion is expected by 2037.

== Bus ==
=== RTC Transit ===
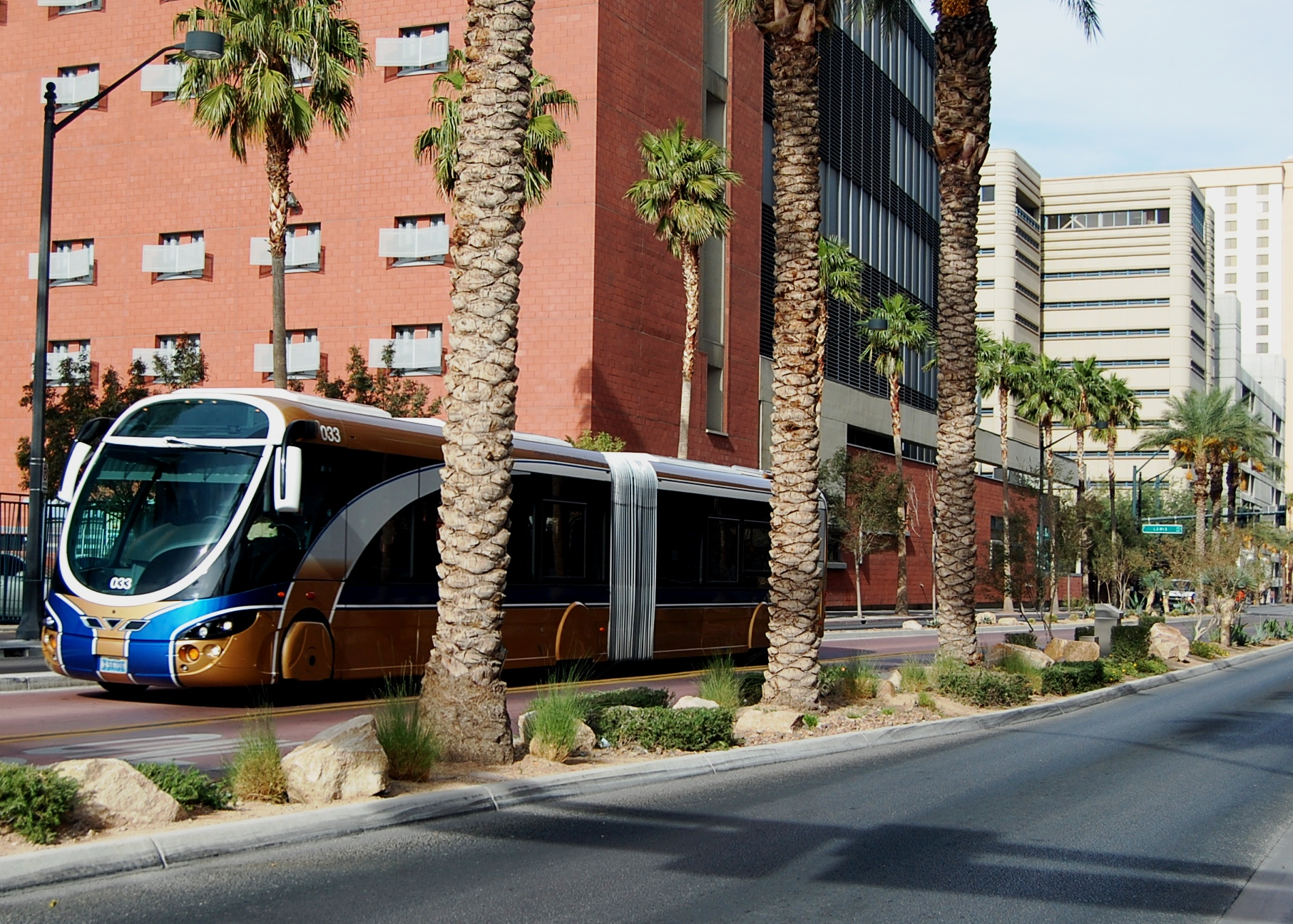
The former Strip and Downtown Express (SDX), the Regional Transportation Commission (RTC), provides public transportation.

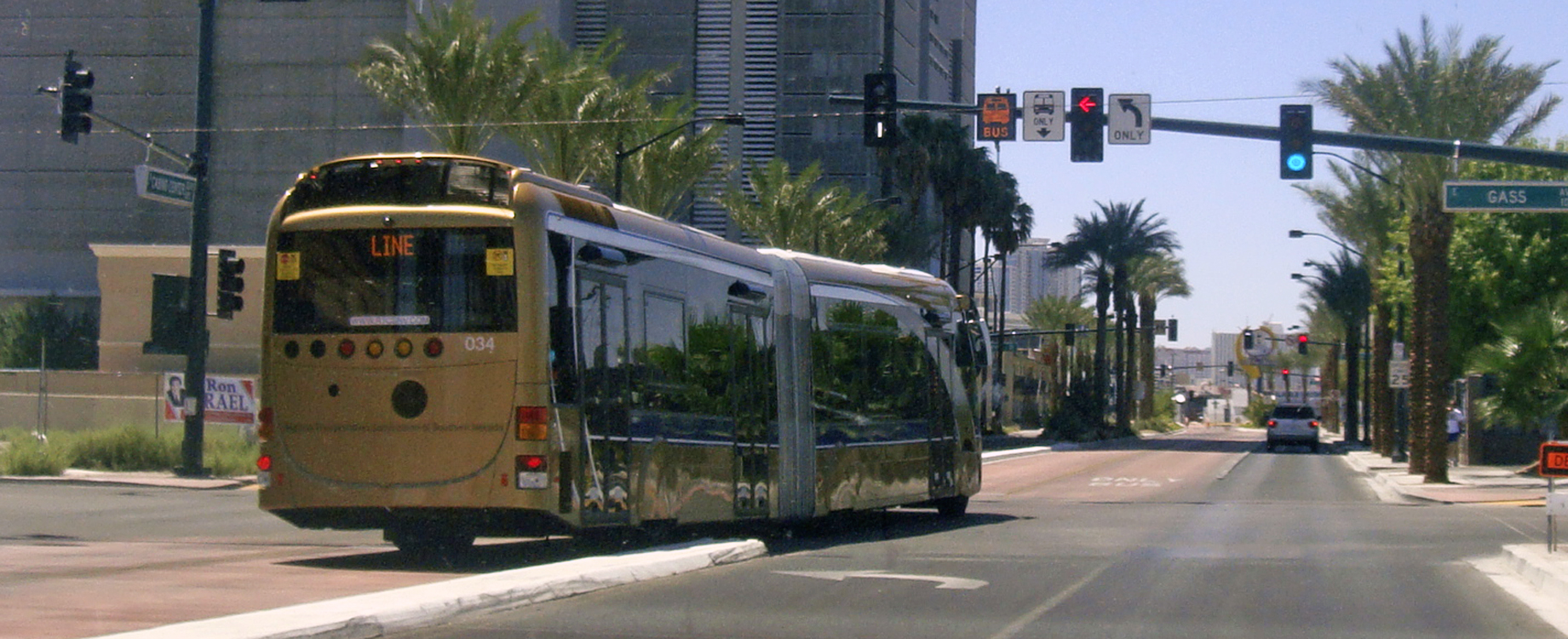
RTC articulated bus operating the BRT line in Las Vegas.

RTC Transit operates the following bus services, in addition to numerous local routes:

- The Deuce – primary Las Vegas Strip services
- Boulder Highway Express (BHX)
- Sahara Express (SX)
- Centennial Express (CX)
- Downtown & Veterans Medical Center Express (DVX)

=== Other regional operators ===
- Silver Rider Transit, which operates in southern and rural portions of Clark County
- Gray Line Worldwide sightseeing tours

=== Transit Stations ===
==== South Strip Transit Terminal ====
South Strip Transit Terminal (SSTT) is a major bus depot south of the Harry Reid Airport. RTC Transit Centennial Express, Deuce, and other buses have a terminal at the SSTT, including Greyhound Bus. South Strip Transit Terminal also has a park and ride facility.

==== Centennial Hills Transit Center and Park & Ride ====
Centennial Hills Transit Center and Park & Ride is in the northwest of the Las Vegas Valley. The Centennial Express bus stops there.

==== Westcliff Transit Center and Park & Ride ====
Westcliff Transit Center and Park & Ride has 140 parking spaces and a ticket vending machine.

==== Bonneville Transit Center ====
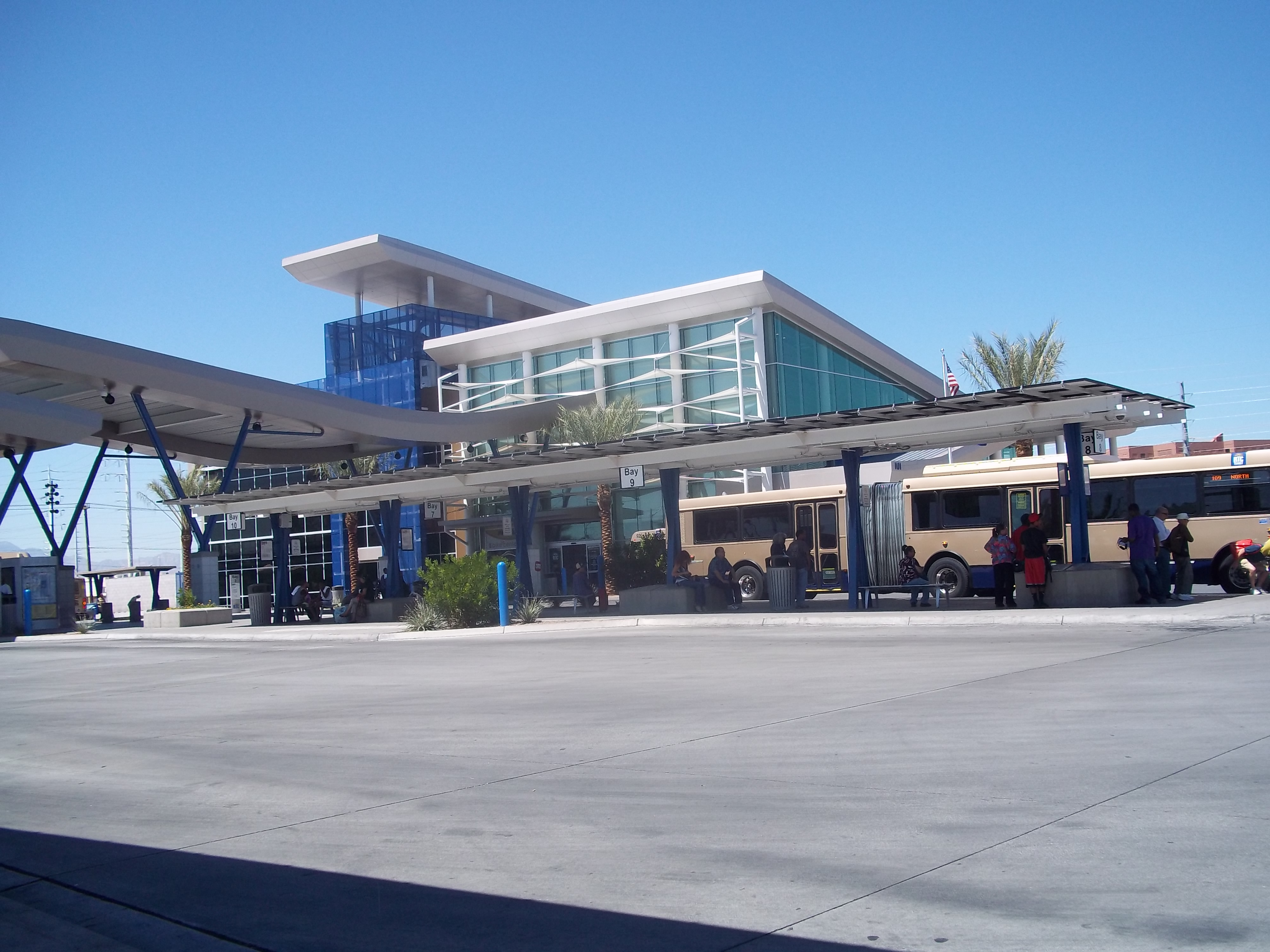
Bonneville Transit Center

Bonneville Transit Center (BTC) is in Downtown Las Vegas. The Centennial Express, Deuce, and RTC DVX stop at the Bonneville Transit Center. The Bonneville Transit Center also has a large bike rack center and a self-service bike repair station.

==== UNLV Transit Center ====
UNLV Transit Center is on the main campus of the University of Nevada, Las Vegas (UNLV). The outdoor UNLV Transit Center was built by the University of Nevada, Las Vegas, and the RTC, and features bicycle racks.

==== Downtown Summerlin Transit Center ====
Downtown Summerlin Transit Center is located in Downtown Summerlin. Buses include Charleston and the Sahara Express (SX).

=== Greyhound Bus ===
Greyhound Bus has stations in Las Vegas, including South Strip Transit Terminal and Harry Reid International Airport.

=== Amtrak Thruway ===
Amtrak Thruway is a bus service that has stations at South Strip Transit Terminal, Airport Terminal One, and downtown. To the east, the Amtrak train, Southwest Chief, picks up at Kingman station in Kingman, Arizona, 107 miles (172 km) to the southeast. There is also a Laughlin to Kingman Amtrak Station at the Tropicana Express Hotel in Laughlin, Nevada, a 34-mile (54.7 km) trip.

== Self-driving shuttle ==
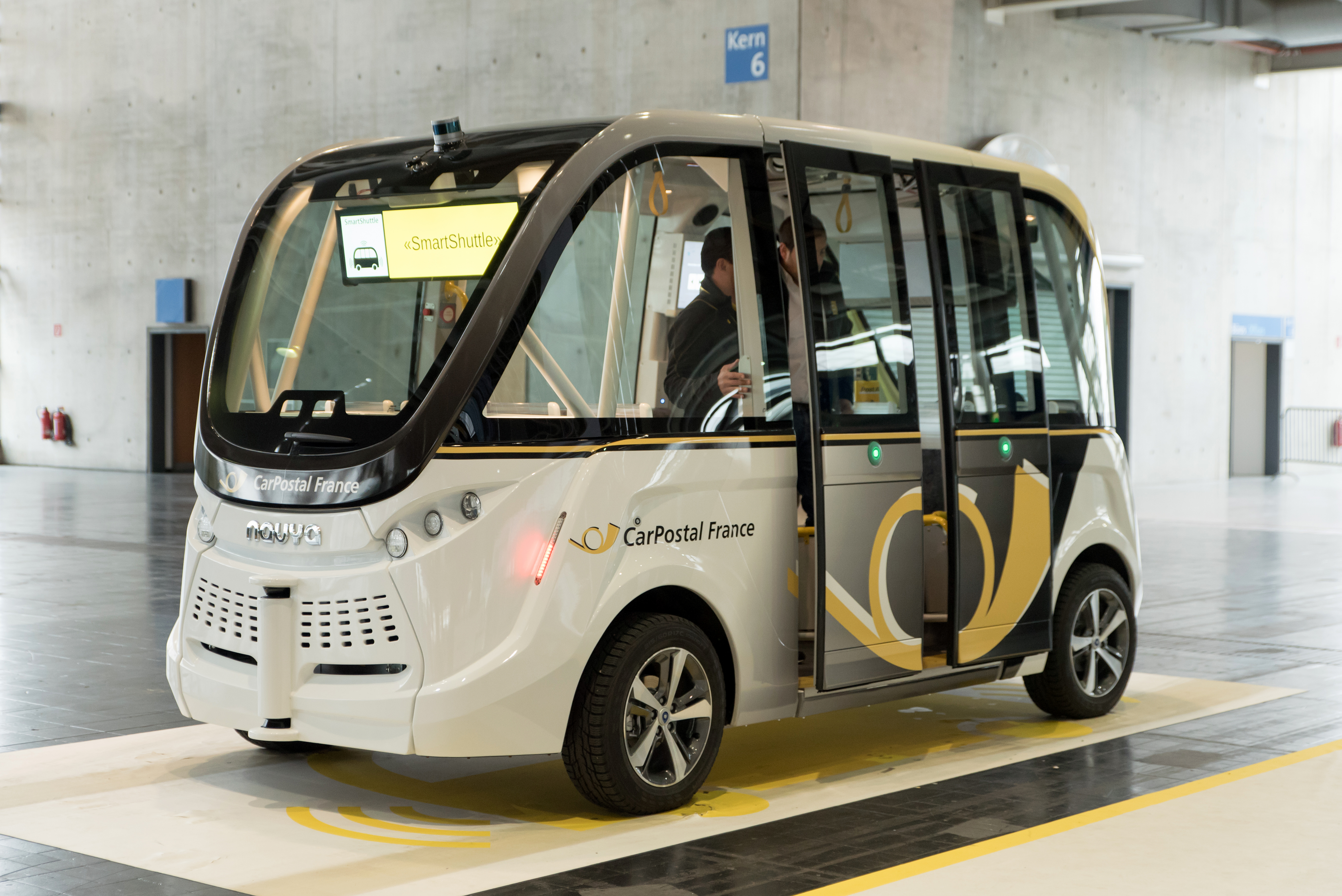
Navya Arma

In January 2017, the city of Las Vegas' fleet logistics provider, Keolis North America, and the shuttle manufacturer Navya SAS partnered to test a driverless shuttle in Downtown Las Vegas on Fremont Street between Las Vegas Boulevard and Eighth Street. The Navya shuttle comes equipped with LiDAR technology, GPS, cameras and odometry. Keolis is the transportation operator for the Regional Transportation Commission of Southern Nevada and has been operating fixed route local and express transit routes in the region since 2013.

The pilot test, which ran in January 2017, was part of Las Vegas' broader efforts to create a designated area in the city's urban center for testing autonomous and connected cars. The City of Las Vegas received a Smart 50 Award for this initiative.

The shuttle was further sponsored for one year, from November 2017 to November 2018. This second pilot program gained international notoriety on launch day, not only for the first connected infrastructure, but also because an 18-wheeler delivery truck backed into the shuttle within hours of its launch. The official City of Las Vegas statement:

The autonomous shuttle was testing today when it was grazed by a delivery truck downtown. The shuttle did what it was supposed to do, in that its sensors registered the truck, and the shuttle stopped to avoid the accident. Unfortunately, the delivery truck did not stop and grazed the front fender of the shuttle. Had the truck had the same sensing equipment that the shuttle has, the accident would have been avoided. Testing of the shuttle will continue during the 12-month pilot in the downtown Innovation District. The shuttle will remain out of service for the rest of the day. The driver of the truck was cited by Metro.

—

== Rail ==
=== Monorail ===
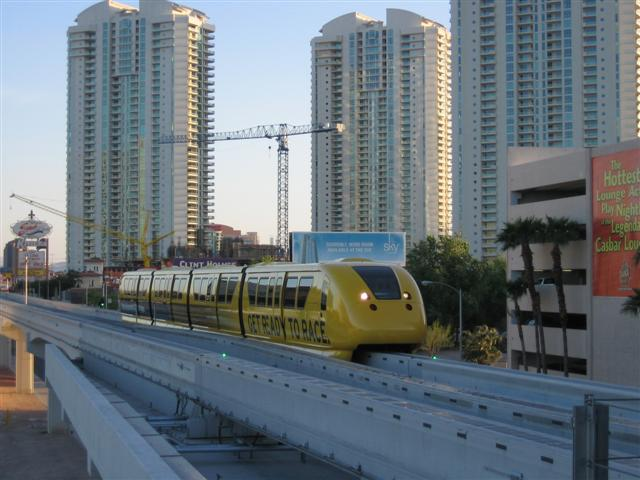
Bombardier MVI rolling stock

Unlike other monorails, which traditionally serve as short-line people movers (such as the Mexico City International Airport Monorail or the Walt Disney World Monorail System), the Las Vegas Monorail is the primary rapid transit system in Las Vegas. It is operated by the Regional Transit Corporation of Southern Nevada (RTC Transit). It was built primarily as a tourist transit system, and exclusively serves the Las Vegas Strip. The system served more than five million people in 2010. Although ridership has declined due to Sahara closing in 2011 and the COVID pandemic, the monorail remains a key piece of the Las Vegas transportation system.

The system was conceived in 1993 as a connection between the MGM Grand and Bally's Las Vegas. It was completed, after many delays, in the summer of 2004 with the completion of what is known as "Phase One" of the monorail. The monorail runs between the MGM Grand and the SLS, which opened in August 2014, replacing the Sahara Casino.

=== Resort trams ===
Resort trams are used to connect different resorts along the strip. The lines all run along the west side of the strip, and all are free of fare payment.

=== Amtrak ===
Amtrak does not offer rail service to or from Las Vegas, but does provide bus service through its Thruway motor coach buses.

Desert Wind was an Amtrak long-distance passenger train that ran from 1979 to 1997.

=== Planned high-speed rail ===
Brightline West is a privately run high-speed rail under construction.

== Vegas Loop ==
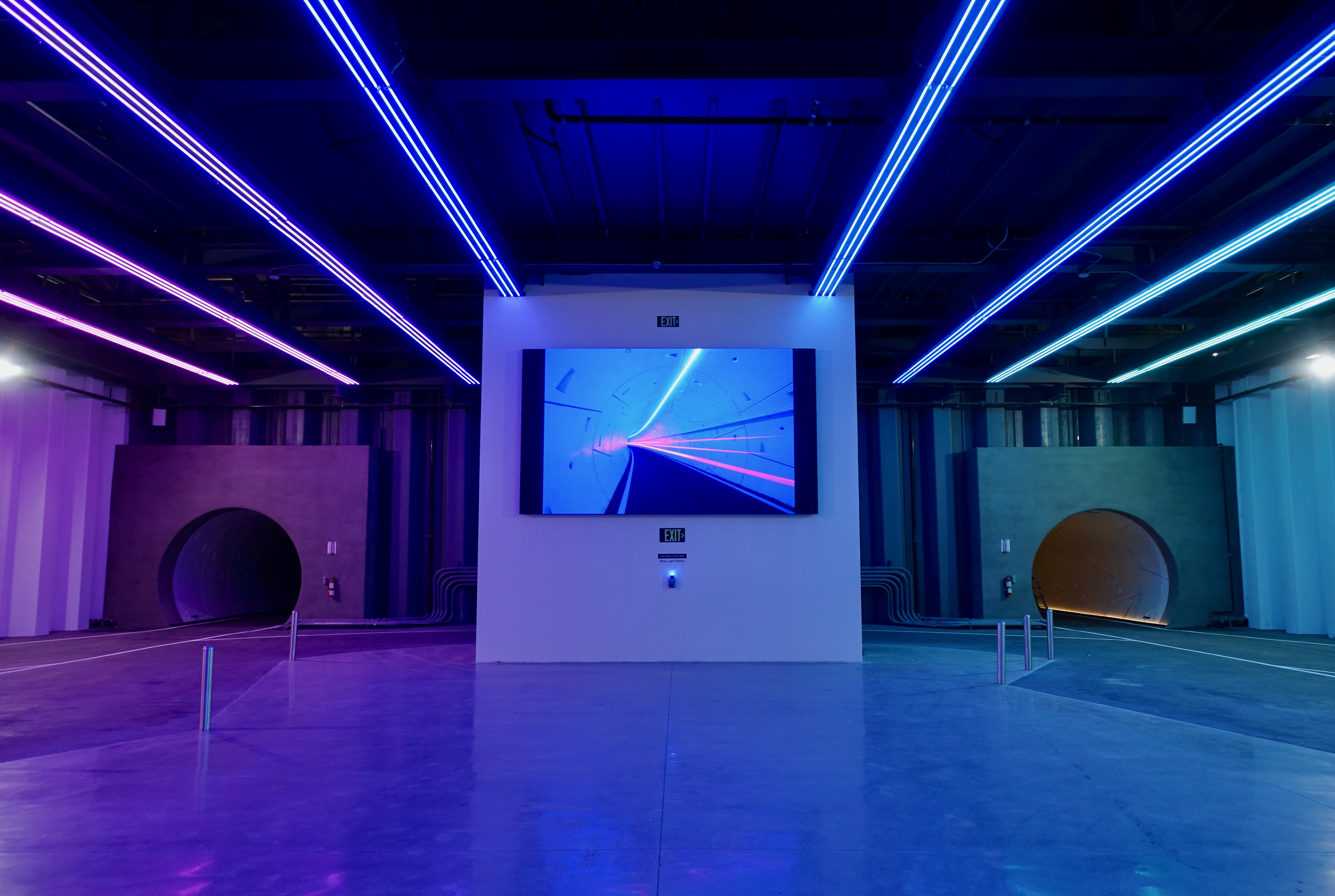
The Boring Company Vegas Loop

The Vegas Loop, also known as the LVCC Loop, is an underground transit tunnel opened in June 2021 to move Las Vegas Convention Center attendees by Tesla taxi around the vast complex. The loop also has a station in the Resorts World Las Vegas hotel and a connection to the Monorail. The loop connects to local RTC bus routes and The Deuce. The system was built to reduce the walking time for attendees of the Las Vegas Convention Center.

== Walking ==
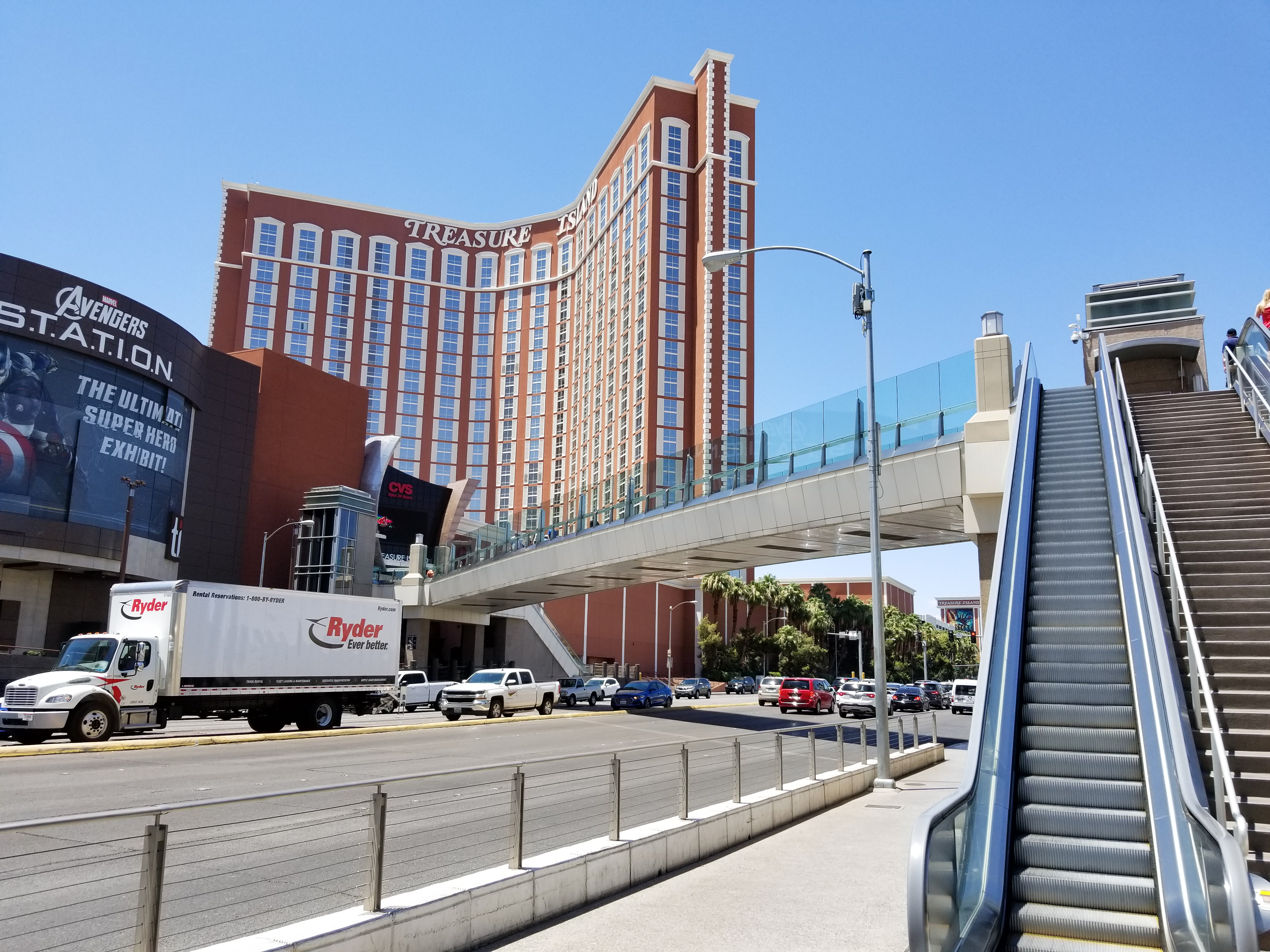
Pedestrian Bridge near Treasure Island Hotel and Casino

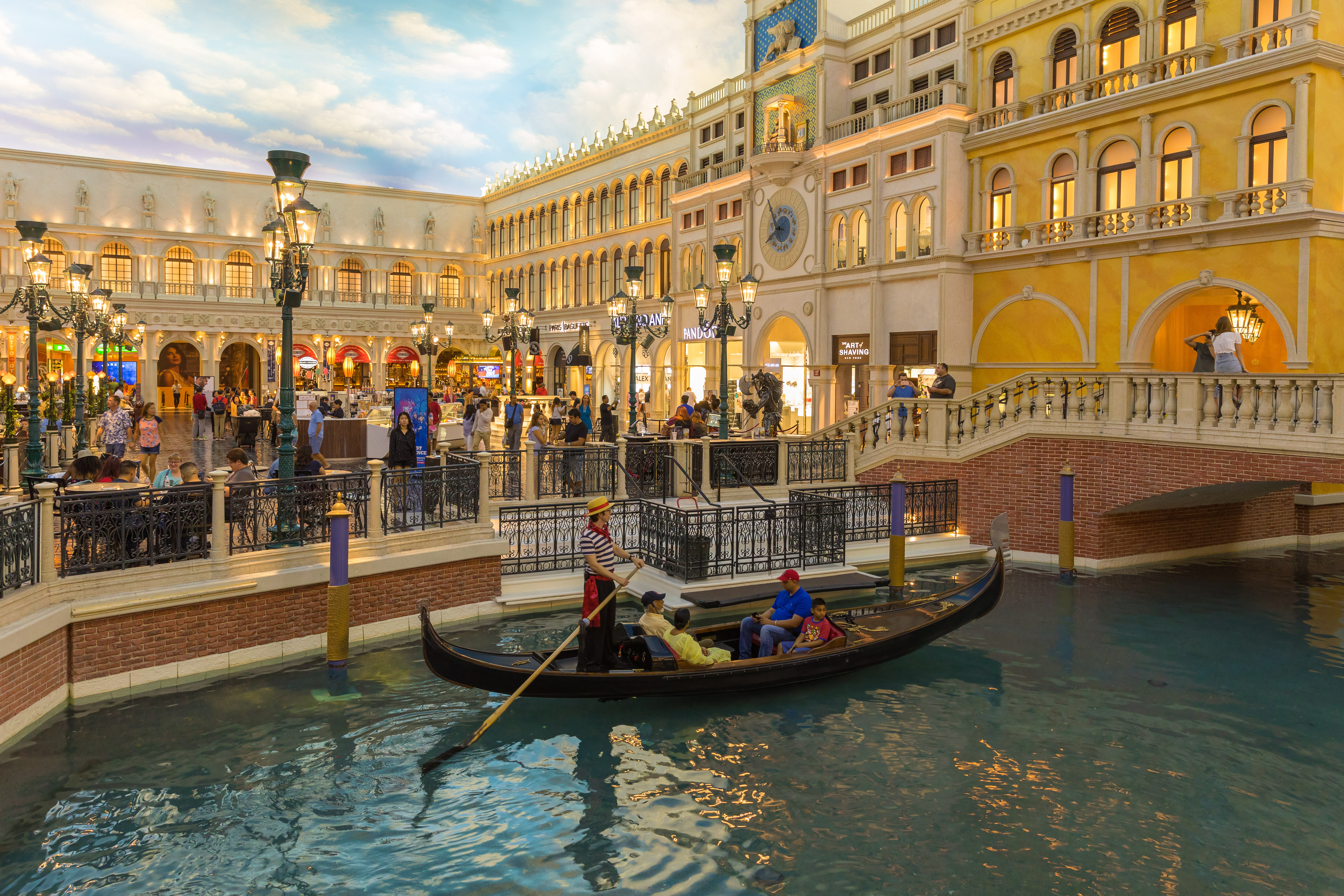
Gondola ride at The Venetian

Multiple elevated walkways exist between casinos, but the Walk Score is only 42 out of 100. Downtown Las Vegas has a Walk Score of 95, as the Downtown Fremont Street is blocked to cars. Walking can be extended by using the Las Vegas Monorail, buses, and other public transportation.

Summer temperatures can be very hot, with June, July, and August highs averaging over 100 °F (38 °C). May and September temperature highs average over 90 °F (32 °C).

== Taxi, limos, and shuttles ==
Both Uber and Lyft operate in Las Vegas. Standard taxi service is also found in the city at designated taxi stands. As of 2023, Las Vegas companies include:

- Ace/ABC Union/ANLV/Vegas Western Cab Company
- Deluxe Taxicab Service
- Desert Cab Company
- Henderson Taxi Company
- Lucky Cab Company
- Nellis Cab Company
- Western Cab Company
- Whittlesea/Blue Cab Company
- Yellow Cab/Checker/Star Cab.

Luxury transportation, in limousine service, is also available. Some limousine companies offer full-size sedans, SUVs, executive vans, and minibuses. Las Vegas has over ten limousine companies. Some hotels offer airport shuttles. Shared and private shuttles are also available, including SuperShuttle, Showtime Tours, and shuttles to other cities, including Tri State Shuttle (Laughlin, Bullhead City, and Kingman), St. George Shuttle, Havasu Express, Commuter Services, Inc., and Aloha Airport Express. Las Vegas also has tour companies that offer desert off-road trips.

== Roads ==
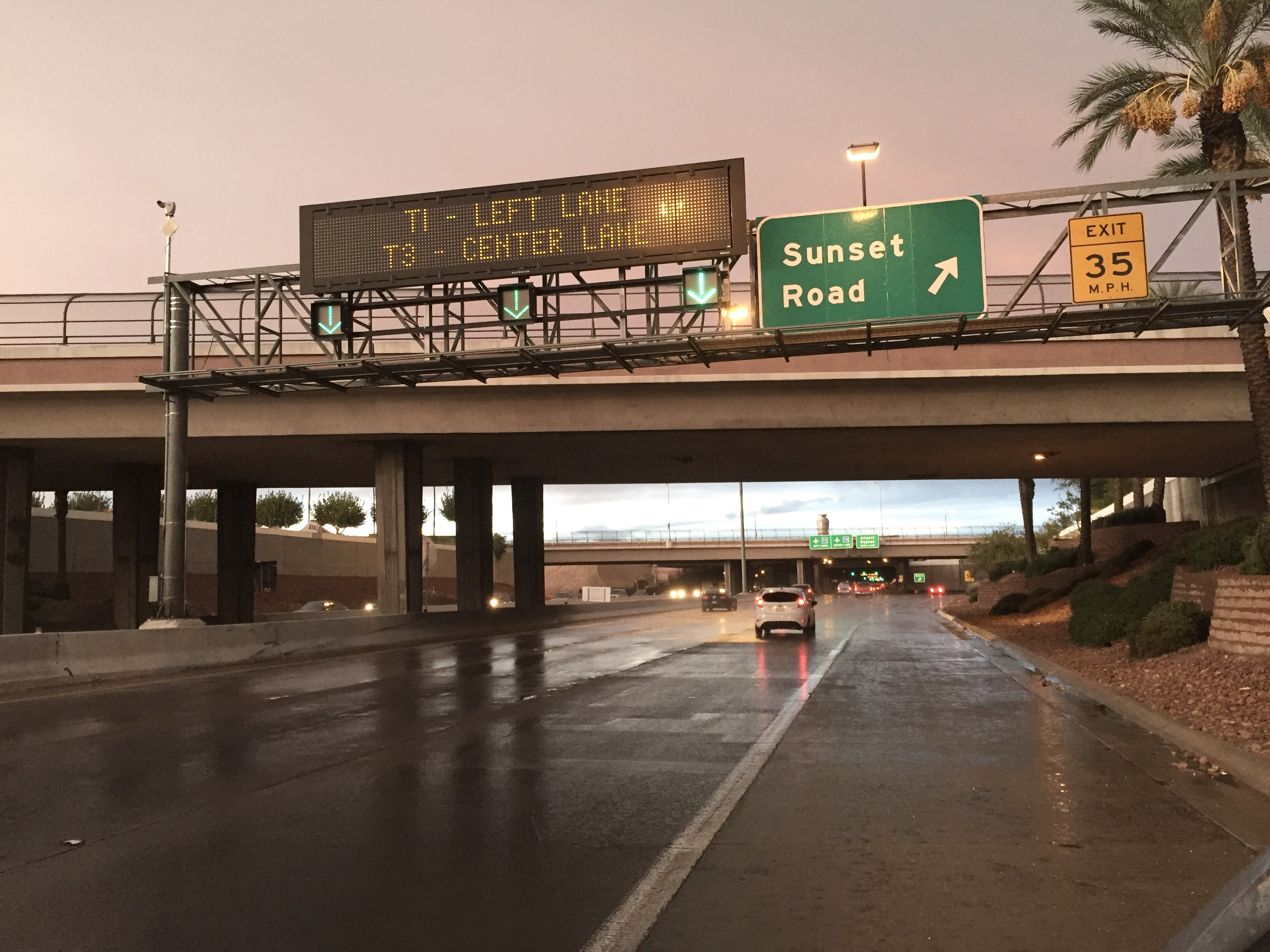
View northbound along SR 171 at Sunset Road, the Harry Reid Airport Connector Road

- Interstate 11 is a north–south freeway that currently runs for roughly 54 miles from the Las Vegas city limits to the Mike O'Callaghan–Pat Tillman Memorial Bridge, continuing northbound to Interstate 80 in Fernley (near the Reno and Sparks area) and southbound to Phoenix, Arizona.
- Interstate 15 is the main north–south freeway through Las Vegas. Northbound travels to St. George, Utah and Salt Lake City. Southbound travels to San Bernardino, California and Los Angeles through the Mojave Desert.
- Las Vegas Beltway is a highway system that circles Las Vegas, consisting of Interstate 215 and Clark County 215.
- US Route 93 in Nevada starts in Las Vegas and travels northbound to Idaho and Montana, following the east part of Nevada and southbound to Arizona.
- US Route 95 in Nevada starts in Las Vegas and travels northbound to Oregon and Idaho, following the west part of Nevada and southbound to California and Arizona.
- Spaghetti Bowl is a common colloquial name for a freeway interchange in downtown Las Vegas, Nevada, between Interstate 15, Interstate 11, US Route 93, and US Route 95, and Martin Luther King Boulevard.
- Summerlin Parkway, also called SR 613, is a freeway in western Las Vegas, running east–west.
- Harry Reid Airport Connector is a freeway running north–south on the east side of the airport to SR 171.
- Nevada State Route 146, called St. Rose Parkway, is a highway south of Las Vegas from I-15 to Henderson.
- Nevada State Route 147 is a state highway running east from Las Vegas to Lake Mead Boulevard.
- Nevada State Route 159, from Charleston Boulevard, is a state highway running east–west.
- Nevada State Route 573, from Craig Road, is a state highway running east–west in North Las Vegas.
- Nevada State Route 574, from Cheyenne Avenue, is a state highway running east–west in North Las Vegas.
- Nevada State Route 579 starts in Las Vegas and travels east to Bonanza Road.
- Nevada State Route 599, also called Tonopah Highway and Rancho Drive, is a northwest highway starting in Las Vegas and joining I-11 and US 95.
- Nevada State Route 604 is a northeast highway starting in Las Vegas, which then joins I-15.
- Nevada State Route 610 is called Lamb Boulevard in Las Vegas.
- Nevada State Route 612, called Nellis Boulevard, is a north–south road on the east side.
- Decatur Boulevard is a major north–south road on the west side.
- Desert Inn Road is a major west-east road with a Convention Center Monorail stop.
- Durango Drive is a major north–south road on the west side.
- Elkhorn Road is a major west-east road.
- Fremont Street is a major northwest downtown Las Vegas street.
- Jones Boulevard is a north - south road through the Las Vegas Valley, part are called SR 596.
- Las Vegas Boulevard, 4 miles called Las Vegas Strip is the main north–south road through Las Vegas.
- Rainbow Boulevard is a north–south highway running the length of the Las Vegas Valley part of SR 595.
- Sahara Avenue is a major east–west roadway.
- Tropicana Avenue is an east–west main road through Las Vegas, also part of SR 593. Tropicana – Las Vegas Boulevard intersection is the main local street to Harry Reid International Airport.

== See also ==
- Transportation in Nevada
- Plug-in electric vehicles in Nevada § Las Vegas
