= Air Vegas =

US-american airline

| IATA | ICAO | Call sign |
|---|---|---|
| 6V | VGA | Air Vegas |
- Founded: 1971; 55 years ago
- Ceased operations: September 2004; 22 years ago
- Fleet size: 9
- Destinations: Grand Canyon, Arizona
- Headquarters: North Las Vegas Air Terminal; North Las Vegas, Nevada
- Key people: Sid E. Petty, owner
- Website: airvegas.com

Air Vegas (IATA: 6V, ICAO: VGA, call sign: Air Vegas) was an airline with its headquarters on the grounds of the North Las Vegas Air Terminal in North Las Vegas, Nevada. It operated sightseeing flights from Las Vegas to the Grand Canyon. Prior to moving to the North Las Vegas Airport its main bases were McCarran International Airport (LAS), Las Vegas and Henderson Executive Airport (HND), Las Vegas. Rankings published in 1991 and 1994 placed the airline in the top 50 regional/commuter airlines in the United States by passenger enplanements.

== History ==
The airline was established and started operations in 1971. It provided aerial tours of the Grand Canyon and charter service out of Las Vegas. The company's main competitors were Scenic Airlines and Lang Air, which eventually became Vision Airlines.

Air Vegas' principal base of operations was originally at McCarran International Airport (LAS). It then moved to Sky Harbor Airport, later name changed to Henderson Executive Airport (NV).

The original fleet consisted of 2 Cessna 207s a Cessna 337 Skymaster and a Beechcraft A-36 Bonanza. By 1975, the fleet numbered five, two twin-engine and three single-engine planes. By 1997, the fleet had grown to twenty planes.

The airline was founded by Sid Petty and his original pilots were Mike Cowan, Clive Bolinger and Mitch LaFortune. In the 1980s the airline in flew tours along the old tour route using Cessna 402's and while the owner, Sid Petty, flew a Beech Baron 58 from the (LAS) commuter passenger terminal. This small building was north of the old Hughes Air terminals, on the west side of McCarran. The early- to mid-1980s were the boom years for the Grand Canyon tour business.

In 1986, the Grand Canyon tour business was forever changed by an unfortunate mid-air collision between a Grand Canyon Airlines Twin Otter (DHC-6) and a Bell Ranger tour helicopter.

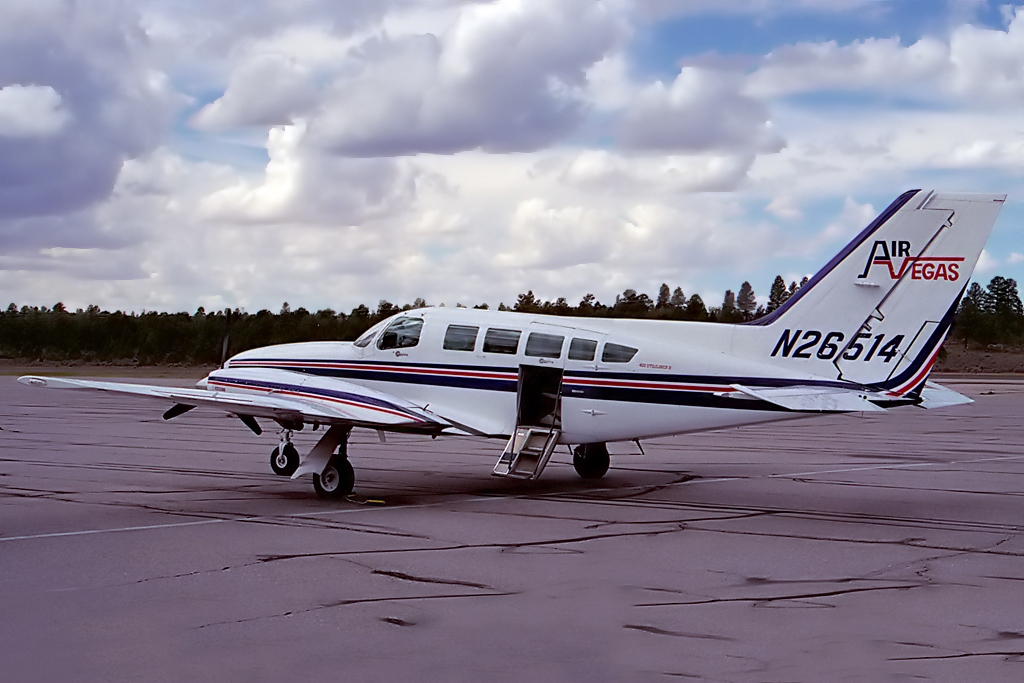
An Air Vegas Airlines Cessna 402

After the 1986, the Federal Aviation Administration (FAA) began research on how it might reduce any future mid-air collisions over the Grand Canyon. The result was the SFAR 50 regulatory environment that now governs Grand Canyon flight operations. Air Vegas, and all of the tour operators eventually formed a "Tour Operators Alliance" to flight excessive regulation of the Grand Canyon tour business by the federal government.

In the 1990s the company made the decision to start using the faster Beechcraft C99 Airliners. Originally, Air Vegas operated under CFR 14, Part 135 as an air taxi operator; eventually, the FAA required the company to change to the more restrictive CFR 14, Part 121 airline rules. This was done to add an additional measure of safety to flight operations.

In 1993, the airline flew about 55,000 tourists on their Grand Canyon sight-seeing route, 99% of whom were foreign visitors.

In the early 2000s, the company left its Henderson base and moved to the North Las Vegas Airport. The company continued to use the Beech 99 aircraft, until airline operations ceased on September 30, 2004, about sixteen months after the death of its founder and owner.

== Fleet ==
The Air Vegas fleet:

- Cessna 206 (Cessna 207 Stationair) operated two
- Cessna 337 Skymaster operated one
- Beech A-36 Bonanza operated one
- Cessna Model 402 (Cessna 402 Businessliner)
- Beechcraft C99 (Beech 99) with a total of nine aircraft by September 2004.

== See also ==
- List of defunct airlines of the United States
