= Southern Nevada Supplemental Airport =

Proposed airport in southern Nevada, United States

- IATA: none; ICAO: none

Summary
- Airport type: Public
- Owner: Clark County Commission
- Operator: Clark County Department of Aviation
- Serves: Las Vegas Valley
- Location: Jean and Primm, Nevada, U.S.
- Coordinates: 35°41′20.15″N 115°21′35.26″W
- Interactive map of Southern Nevada Supplemental Airport

Southern Nevada Supplemental Airport (SNSA), previously known as Ivanpah Valley Airport, is a new commercial airport in development by the Clark County Department of Aviation (CCDOA), located along Interstate 15 (I-15) between the towns of Jean and Primm in Clark County, Nevada, approximately 23 miles (37 km) south of the Las Vegas Strip.

== Overview ==
The airport is intended to provide long-term aviation capacity for the Las Vegas metropolitan area, primarily serving domestic, international, charter, and cargo flights. The new airport site covers an area of 6,000 acres (2,400 ha) and an additional 17,000 acres (6,900 ha) of land that are set aside as a compatibility buffer, making the new airport site over 23,000 acres (9,300 ha), or about 36 square miles.

The new Southern Nevada Supplemental Airport (SNSA) will become the second international airport serving the Southern Nevada region, complementing the existing Harry Reid International Airport (LAS). LAS, which is currently landlocked and unable to expand significantly, has experienced substantial growth in passenger volume in recent years. This surge reflects Las Vegas's continued rise as a premier destination for leisure travel, conventions, professional sports, and an expanding business sector. As a result of this sustained growth, Harry Reid International Airport has become the sixth busiest airport in the United States.

Clark County Department of Aviation officials are expecting Harry Reid International Airport (LAS) to reach its full capacity of 63 million passengers annually by 2030.

=== SNSA Airport development ===
The Clark County Department of Aviation is teaming up with the Bureau of Land Management (BLM) and the Federal Aviation Administration (FAA) to make decisions on the four phases of the new airport development - planning, design, construction and operation. The environmental review comes at the end of the planning phase and at the beginning of the design phase.

On June 18, 2024, the Clark County Board of Commissioners approved a $1 million contract to retain Landrum and Brown Aviation Consultants to prepare the Environmental Impact Statement for the Southern Nevada Supplemental Airport (SNSA).

The Joint Lead Agencies (FAA and BLM) are holding three public scoping meetings on July 29, 30, and 31, 2025 designed to inform the public about the project.

=== Construction ===
Construction of the new SNSA is expected to begin by 2029 with completion as early as 2035. The new airport will be the single largest public works project in the history of Nevada. According to the Clark County Department of Aviation, the new airport is projected to cost between $6 billion and $14 billion to develop and build.

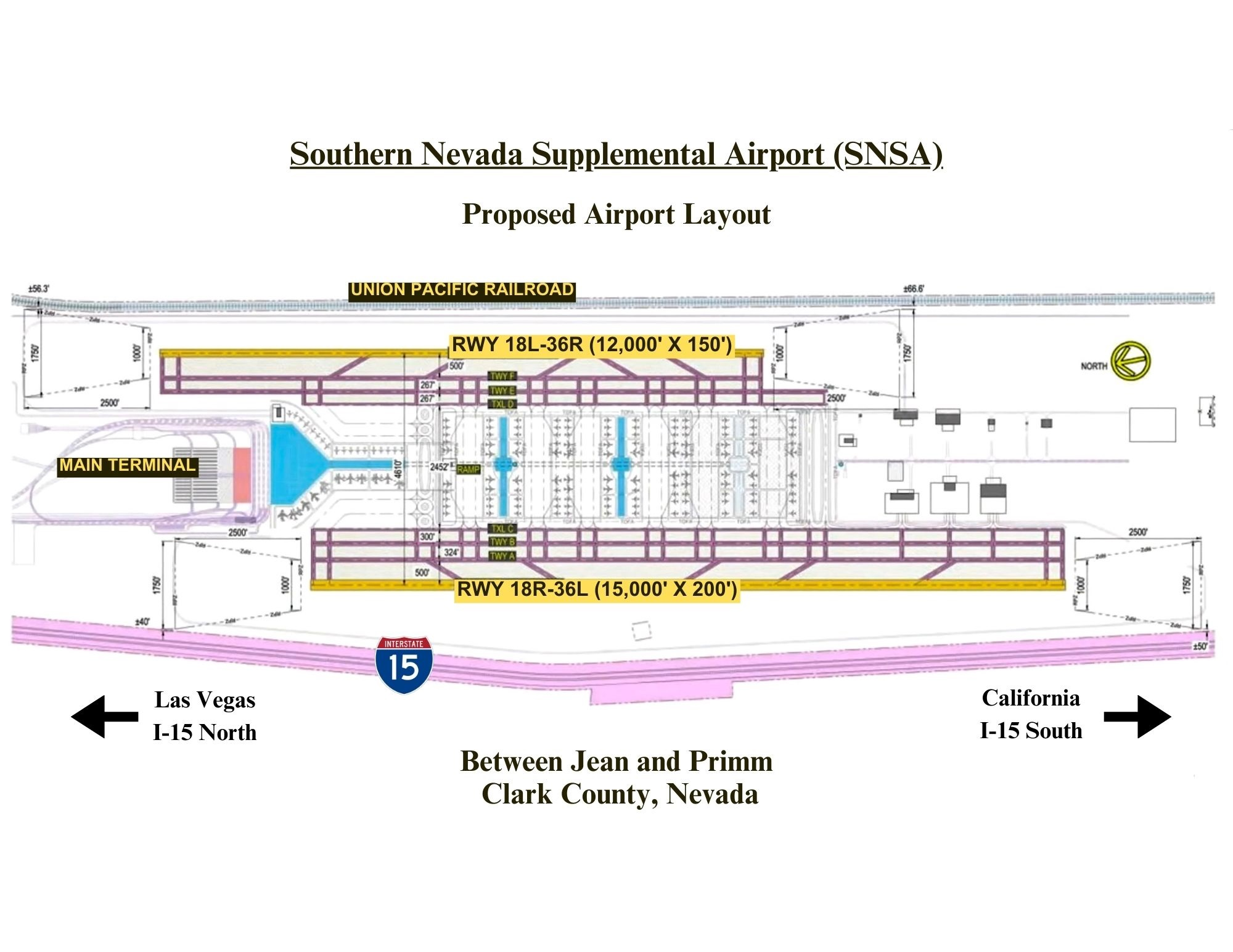
Proposed layout of Southern Nevada Supplemental Airport in Clark County, Nevada.

=== Terminals and gates ===
The initial layout of the new airport features multiple terminals with 153 gates and two runways, RWY 18L-36R (12,000 feet long by 150 feet wide), and RWY 18R-36L (15,000 feet long by 200 feet wide) which will make it one of the longest civil runways in the United States.

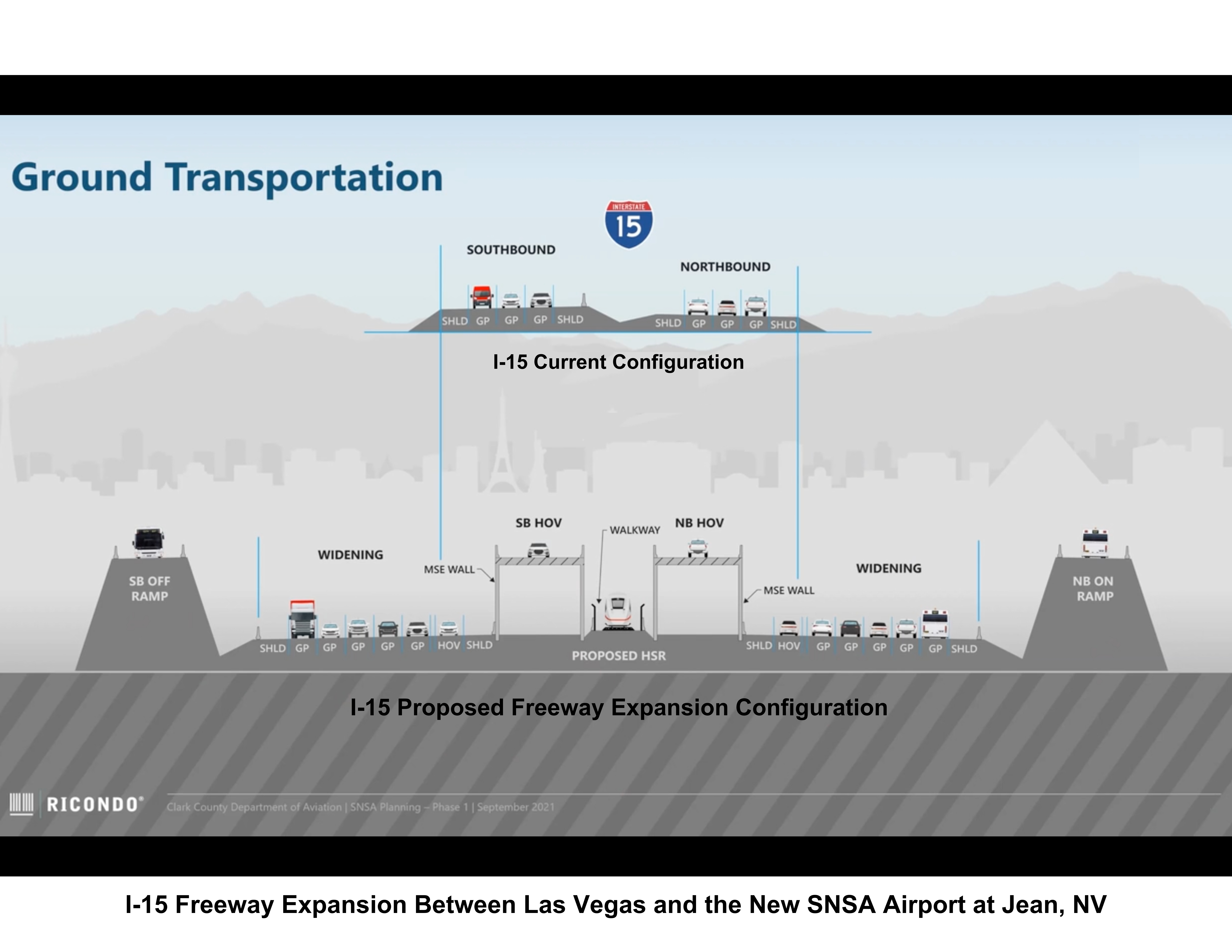
I-15 Freeway Expansion for the Southern Nevada Supplemental Airport

=== SNSA Transportation and Utility Corridor ===
As part of the SNSA development, Clark County is initiating a comprehensive expansion of the 27-mile I-15 south corridor between Sloan and Primm, Nevada, with Jean serving as the primary entry point to the new airport.

The freeway will be widened from its current 6 lanes to 14 lanes, accommodating increased traffic and a right-of-way for the Brightline West train, which is currently in development. The expansion will also feature dedicated ramps providing direct access to and from the airport, ensuring seamless travel into Las Vegas and minimizing potential traffic delays.

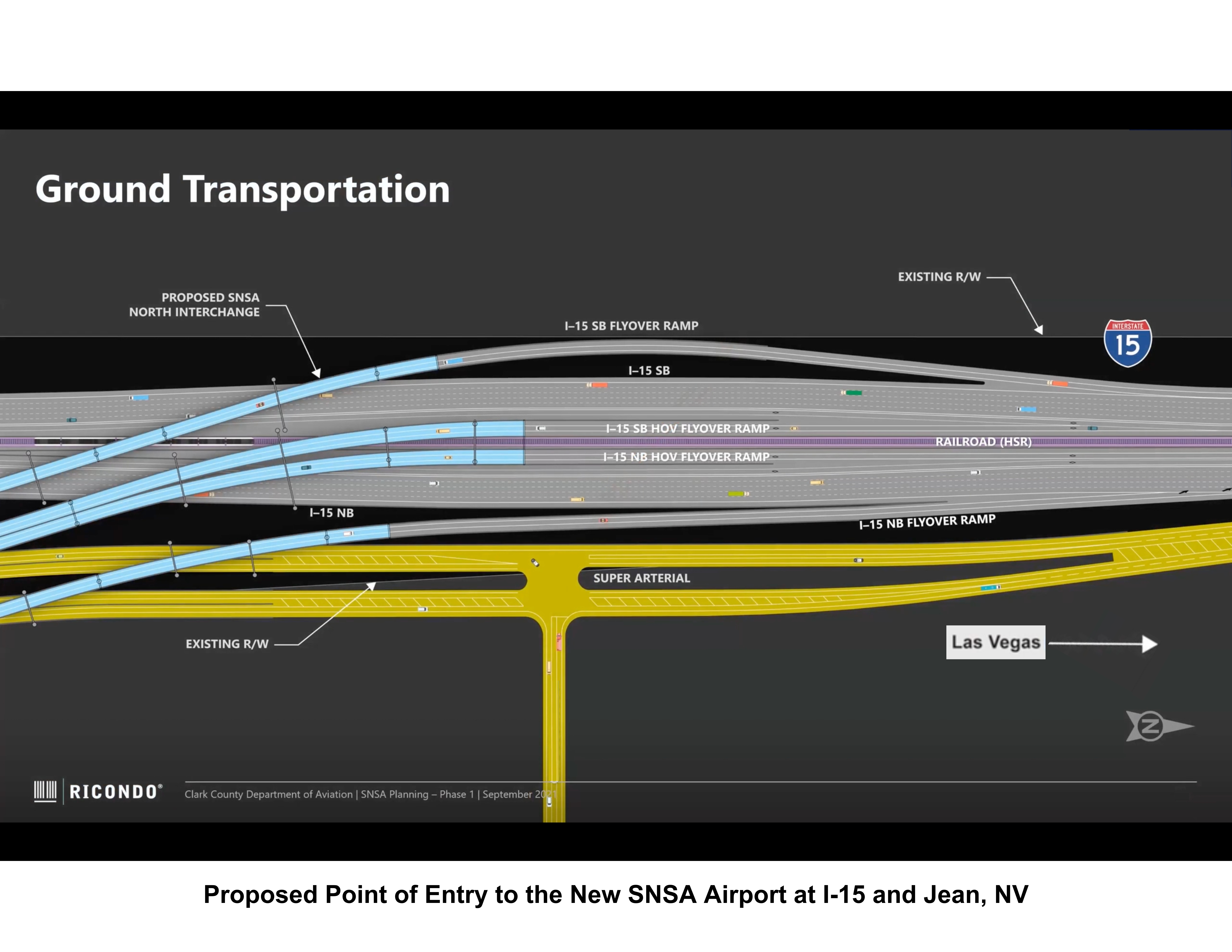
Proposed I-15 freeway layout of the Southern Nevada Supplemental Airport at Jean, NV.

The SNSA development will incorporate multiple transportation modes, including trams and buses.

In conjunction with the airport project, Clark County is also executing a significant utility infrastructure upgrade to bring water, electricity, and reclamation services to the site at Jean, Nevada.

=== Economic impact ===
The airport will have a positive economic impact for the Greater Las Vegas metropolitan area and the nearby towns of Goodsprings, Primm, and Sandy Valley. The new Southern Nevada Supplemental Airport will generate increased economic activity, connect communities, maintain and improve infrastructure, and improve Nevada’s transportation network. The new airport is expected to create thousands of construction jobs, and thousands of permanent jobs once the airport is complete.

=== Access to airport ===
The SNSA will be accessible from Las Vegas via Interstate 15 (I-15) at the Jean exit, as well as from the towns of Goodsprings and Sandy Valley via Nevada State Route 161. Brightline West is also expected to run in tracks located between I-15 and the airport, with potential for a future connection.

== History ==
The airport project, previously called the Ivanpah Valley Airport, has been renamed to Southern Nevada Supplemental Airport (SNSA).

The Clark County Department of Aviation (CCDOA) is developing the new Southern Nevada Supplemental Airport (SNSA) on land that was conveyed by patent, by an act of Congress, to Clark County pursuant to the Ivanpah Valley Airport Public Lands Act of 2000.

Clark County is authorized to acquire an additional 17,000 acres of land from the Bureau of Land Management, under a provision in the 2002 Clark County Conservation of Public Land and Natural Resources Act, to serve as a compatibility buffer surrounding the new airport. The land use and zoning surrounding the new Southern Nevada Supplemental Airport (SNSA) will be compatible with normal airport operations.

== Formation of new town ==
The Nevada State Legislature, on March 10, 2023, approved Bill SB19 by unanimous vote for the creation of a new commercial town in Clark County for the Southern Nevada Supplemental Airport (SNSA). A name for the new town has yet to be selected.

== See also ==
- Harry Reid International Airport
- Henderson Executive Airport
- North Las Vegas Airport
