= Terrible's Road House =

Large gas station in Nevada

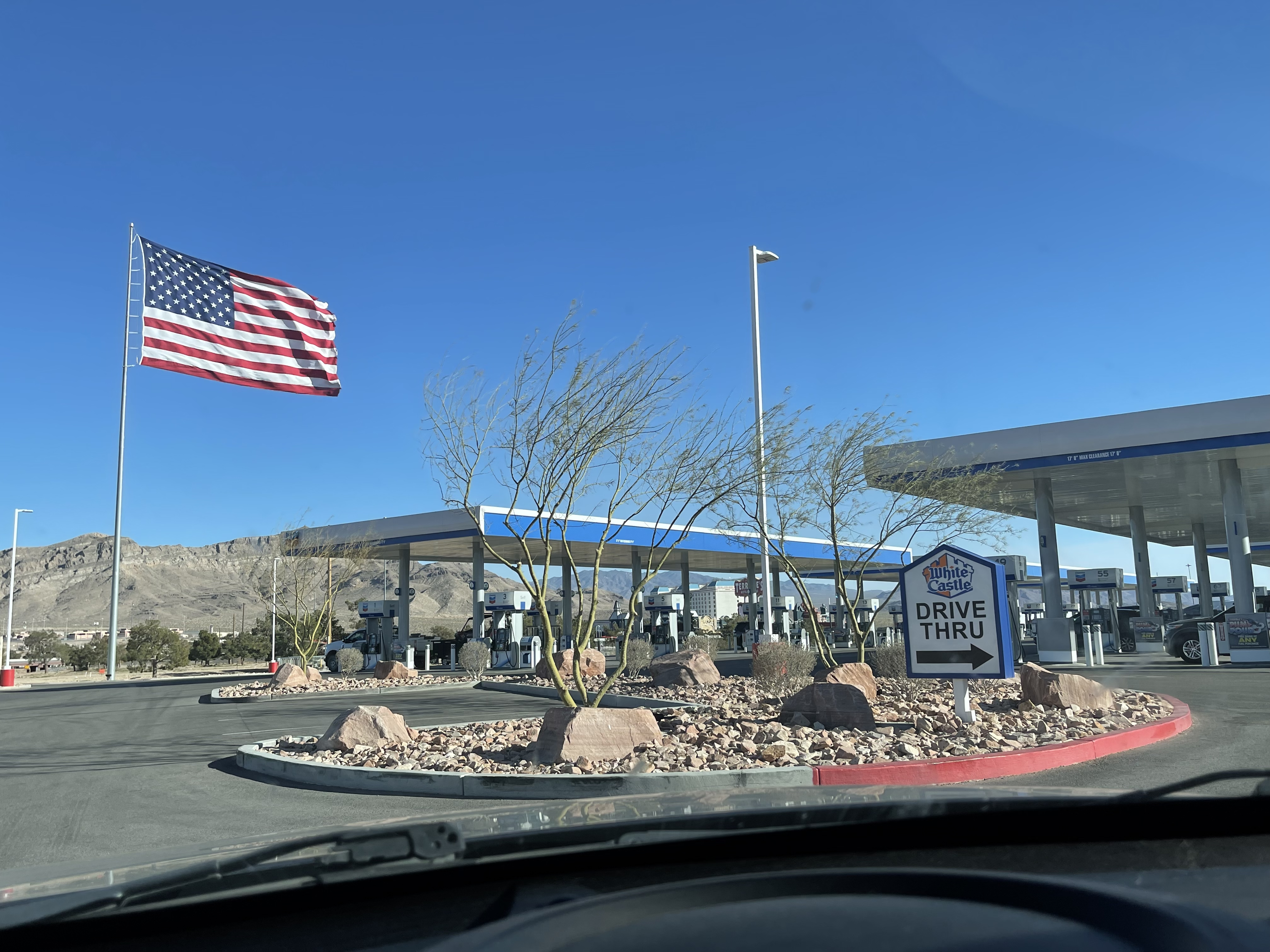
- Two modules of the station, in 2022 from a car

- Location within Nevada Location within the United States
- Alternative names: World's Largest Chevron

General information
- Status: Operating
- Location: 22625 NV-161, Jean NV 89019
- Coordinates: 35.7819°N 115.3322°W
- Current tenants: Advance Auto Parts; Jack Link's; Red Bull; White Castle
- Opened: July 6, 2018; 8 years ago
- Owner: Terrible Herbst

Design and construction
- Known for: Containing the world's largest Chevron

Website
- terriblesroadhouse.com

Terrible's Road House is a gas station in Jean, Nevada off Nevada State Route 161. It contains the World's Largest Chevron and is a tourist trap for people traveling from Las Vegas to California, being about 30 mi (48 km) south of the former. It has 96 pumps, 60 restroom stalls, and a 50,000 sq ft (4,600 m^{2}) convenience store. The gas station is owned and operated by Terrible Herbst.

== History ==
The center opened on July 6, 2018.

== Features ==
The station contains a White Castle restaurant, and it is the third ever to open in the Western United States, and the first there outside of Las Vegas. Prior to its opening, it was set to employ 100 people, with about 20 people on each shift. It also has 72 soda fountain heads, six times the average amount, and a 30 ft (9.1 m) coffee bar. It also contains the second-ever physical Jack Link's store, displaying a 13 ft (4.0 m) tall bigfoot statue at the entrance. A lounge dedicated to Red Bull is also found within the grounds; it is the first physical location where enthusiasts of the sports drink can buy merchandise. The center also provides 15 slot and video poker machines. It has a racing theme with planes suspended from the ceiling and a replica NASCAR car.
