= Navya SAS =

French company

Navya Mobility SAS
- Type: Société anonyme
- Traded as: Euronext: NAVYA
- Industry: Autonomous cars
- Predecessor: Induct, Navya SAS
- Founded: 1 June 2014; 2014
- Headquarters: 1 RUE DU DR PIERRE FLEURY PAPILLON, Villeurbanne, France
- Key people: Jean-Claude Bailly (C.E.O)
- Owners: NTT West Japan 29.15%, Macnica: 70.85%
- Number of employees: 140 (2024)
- Parent: Macnica GROUP
- Website: Navya Mobility

Navya Mobility, formerly Gama and Navya, is a company specialized in the design and construction of autonomous and electric vehicles, originally founded in Lyon, France in 2017. The company was acquired from receivership in April 2023 by autonomous vehicle manufacturer Gaussin, and semiconductor manufacturer Macnica, and changed its name to Gaussin-Macnica-Mobility, Gama for short. In June 2024, Gaussin sold its stake in Gama.

== History ==
Navya's experimental self driving cars

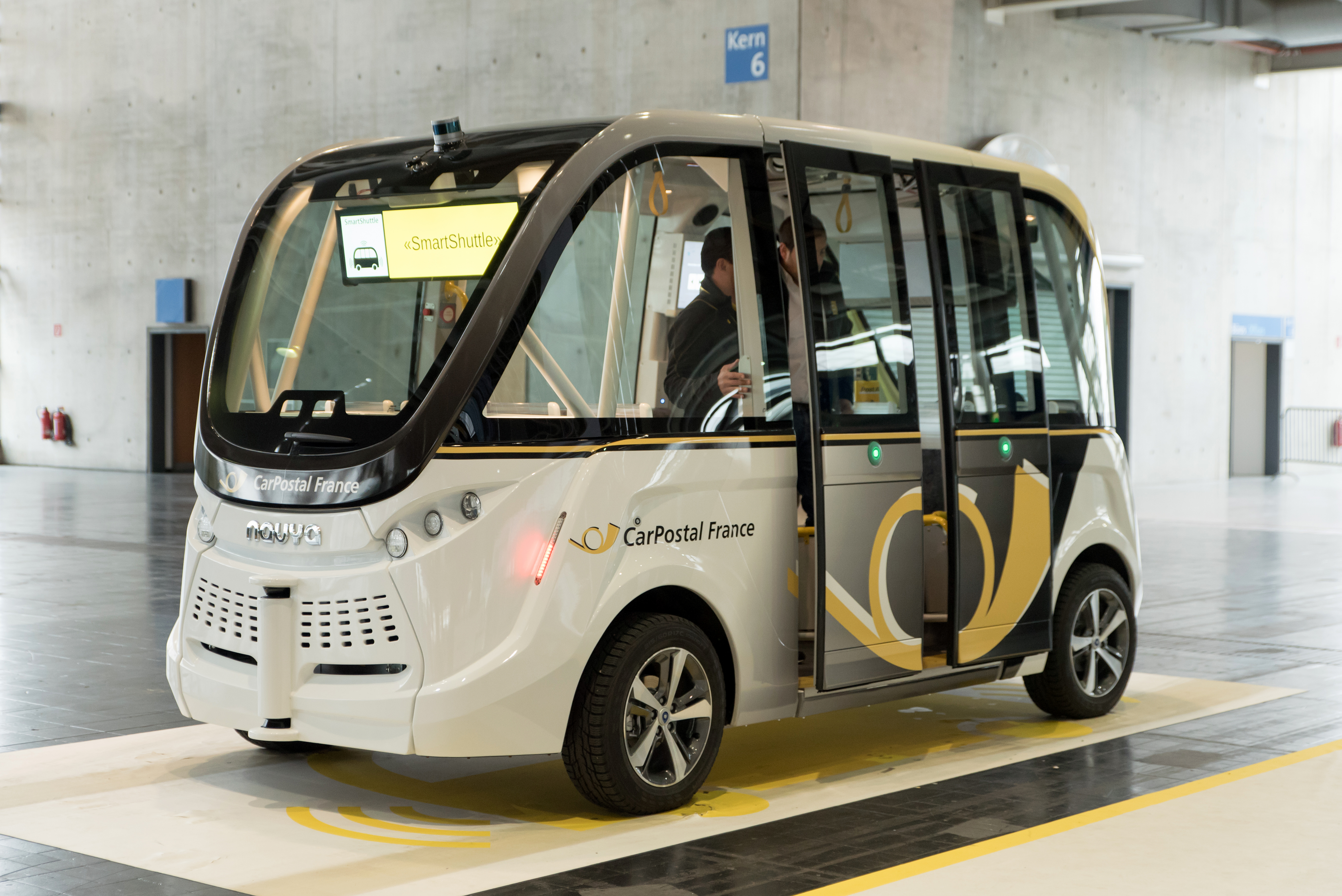
At CeBit, Germany

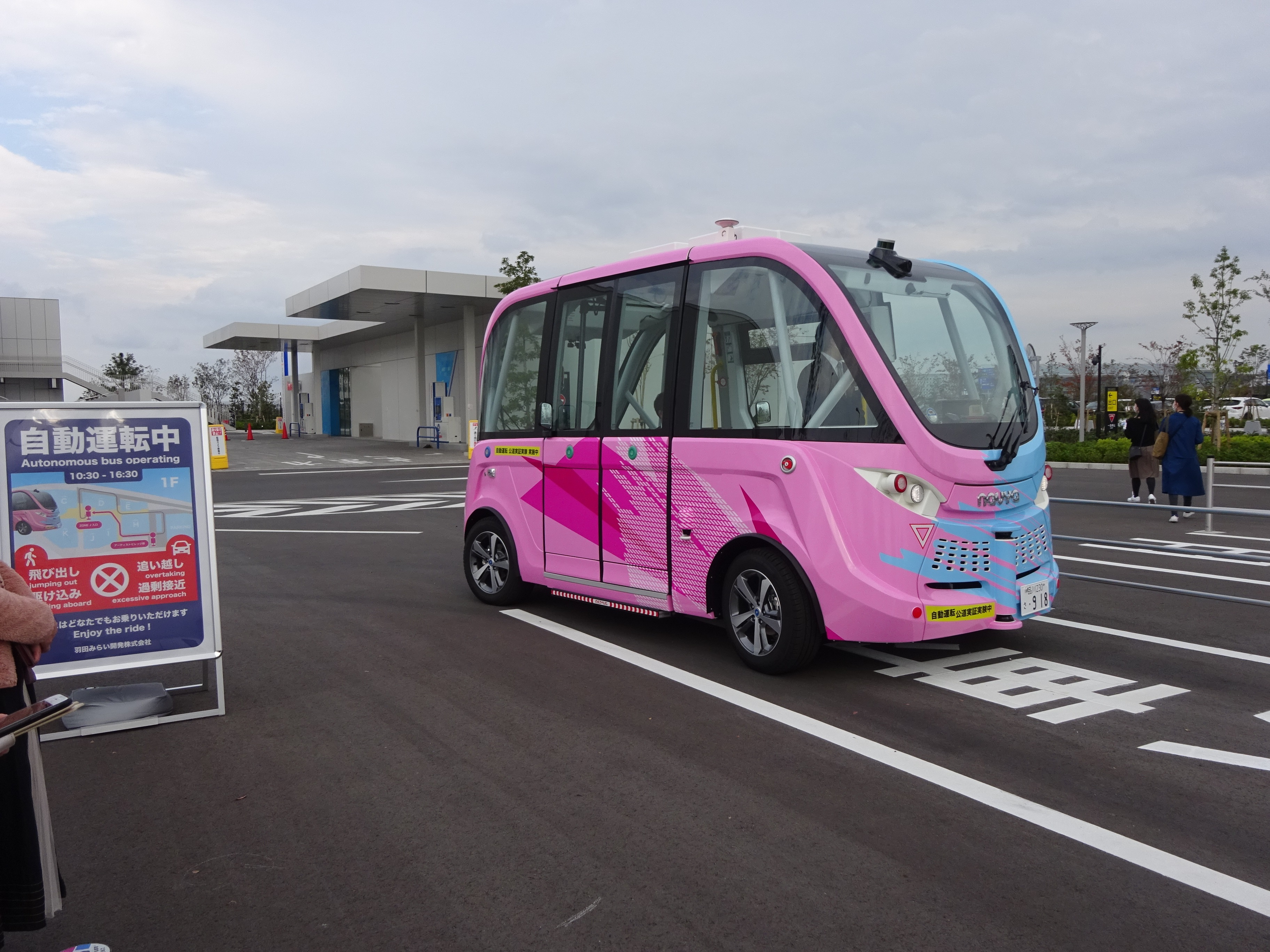
In Japan

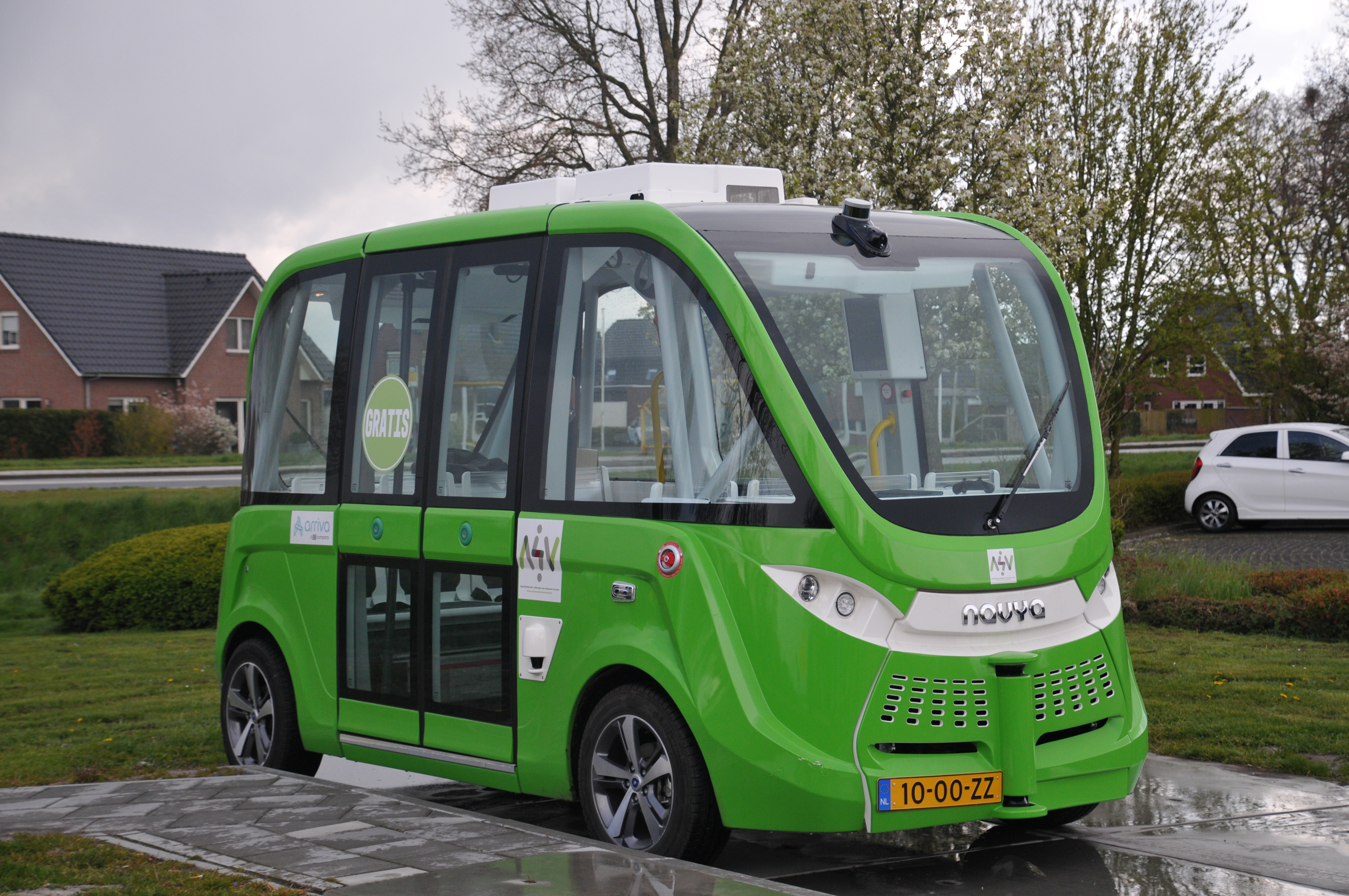
In The Netherlands

In June 2014, Christophe Sapet, co-founder of the companies Infogrames and Infonie, joined the investment fund Robolution Capital to take over the assets of the company Induct, then in liquidation.

Induct launched Navia, a self-driving electric van. This prototype was demonstrated at the 2014 Consumer Electronics Show in Las Vegas and was tested on the site of the Civaux Nuclear Power Plant in June 2015.

Six engineers remained in the new structure renamed Navya, based between Paris and Lyon. One year after the company's takeover, the new company launched Arma, the first standalone production vehicle.

In June 2021 Etienne Hermite stepped down as CEO and was replaced by Pierre Lahutte

In July 2021, Navya received 7.5m Euros of Subsidies from the Government of France to develop further Projects

Navya was put in receivership in 1 February 2023. The company was acquired from receivership in April 2023 by autonomous vehicle manufacturer Gaussin, and semiconductor manufacturer Macnica, and changed its name to Gaussin Macnica Mobility.

=== Pilot studies ===
- France. In 2016 in Lyon, an experimental service of electric and autonomous minibus service was launched in the Confluence district.
- France. In September 2021, Navya also began testing its new Autonom Tract 135 in with French Logistics Company Geodis. The Autonom Tract is an autonomous tractor for baggage handling.
- USA. A Navya driverless shuttle is operating in downtown Las Vegas. The city of Las Vegas and Keolis initially partnered on a short term deployment in January 2017, which has been followed by a year-long pilot sponsored by AAA of Northern California, Nevada & Utah for a 0.6 mile loop involving eight intersections and connected infrastructure. On November 8, 2017, the shuttle was involved in a minor incident when it was grazed by a delivery truck. The human driver was found to be at fault. As of May 2018, 25,000 passengers had ridden the AAA Self-Driving Shuttle. The current AAA sponsored pilot program is highlighted under Transportation in Las Vegas.
- Singapore. Navya has self-driving vehicles being piloted in Singapore.
- Norway. In April 2019, Navya self-driving buses enter commercial service in downtown Oslo, Norway's capital.
- Japan. In April 2020, Navaya was adopted to a Japanese town of Sakai as the country's first public service of autonomous mobility on open roads. And, Sakai town started operating the service in November. In August 2021, Softbank backed Boldly announced that they decided to roll out more stops in Sakai after the successful test run.
- United Kingdom. In September 2021, Navya and Darwin launched the first autonomous shuttle project on Public Roads in the UK
- Sweden. Starting in 2021, Navya began piloting its service with Västtrafik in Gothenburg.
- Malta. Starting in June 2026, the Malta Public Transport announced the commissioning of a Navya bus to be used on Maltese roads for an initial testing phase of 6 months. This will be a pilot project, of which results will determine whether the MPT will start operating a Navya autonomous bus fleet on a permanent basis.
