= Searchlight Airport =

- IATA: none; ICAO: none; FAA LID: 1L3

Summary
- Airport type: Public
- Owner: U.S. Bureau of Land Management
- Serves: Searchlight, Nevada
- Elevation AMSL: 3,413 ft / 1,040 m
- Coordinates: 35°26′40″N 114°54′34″W

Map
- Location of airport in Nevada 1L3 (the United States)

Runways
Direction	Length		Surface
Direction	ft	m	Surface
16/34	5,040	1,536	Asphalt

Statistics (2011)
- Aircraft operations: 300
- Source: Federal Aviation Administration

Searchlight Airport (FAA LID: 1L3) is a public use airport owned by the U.S. Bureau of Land Management and located two nautical miles (4 km) south of Searchlight, in Clark County, Nevada, United States. The airport is approximately 70 miles (110 km) south of Las Vegas.

== History ==
The United States Air Force built the airstrip in the early 1950s, as an emergency alternate paved airstrip for Nellis Air Force Base.

The airport was operated by Clark County Department of Aviation until 2006.

Bill and Joan Turnbull of Seattle, Washington, bought the roughly 40-acre property out of foreclosure in 2015 with the intent of developing a residential airpark and commercial airport.

== Facilities and aircraft ==
Searchlight Airport covers an area of 179 acres (72 ha) at an elevation of 3,413 feet (1,040 m) above mean sea level. It has one runway designated 16/34 with an asphalt surface measuring 5,040 by 70 feet (1,536 x 21 m). It offers no services and is uncontrolled, unmanned, and unlighted. In 2024, runway 16/34 was said to be "closed indefinitely for repairs". For the 12-month period ending January 31, 2011, the airport had 300 general aviation aircraft operations, an average of 25 per month. In early 2017, the Searchlight Airport added unmanned aircraft operations as the first and fully operational commercial unmanned aircraft systems (UAS)-focused research and development park in the U.S. In early 2018, beyond visual line of sight (BVLOS) flight operations for small UAS began at the park. In late 2018, the FAA approved a 38-mile BVLOS corridor between Searchlight and Boulder City for UAS.

== See also ==
- List of airports in Nevada
