= Clark County Department of Aviation =

Government agency overseeing Las Vegas airports

The Clark County Department of Aviation is part of the government of the Clark County Commission.

Harry Reid International Airport, the main commercial airport and the four general aviation facilities in the Clark County Airport System are owned by the Clark County Commission and operated under the policy direction of the Board of County Commissioners, the authority of the County Manager and the management of the Director and Deputy Director of Aviation.

== Airports ==
=== Henderson Executive Airport ===
Henderson Executive Airport (IATA: HSH, ICAO: KHND) is located in Henderson. The airport functions mainly as a general purpose airport.

=== Jean Sport Aviation Center ===
Jean Sport Aviation Center (FAA LID: 0L7) is located in Jean. The airport functions as a sport aviation center including sky diving and gliding.

=== North Las Vegas Airport ===
North Las Vegas Airport (IATA: VGT, ICAO: KVGT) is located in North Las Vegas. The airport functions mainly as a general purpose airport.

=== Perkins Field ===
Perkins Field (FAA LID: U08) is located in Overton. The airport functions mainly as a general purpose airport.

=== Harry Reid International Airport ===
Harry Reid International Airport (IATA: LAS, ICAO: KLAS) is located in Paradise – The primary commercial airport for Las Vegas and Clark County

== Planned airports ==
- Southern Nevada Supplemental Airport in Jean and Primm – planned future relief airport for Reid
- Sloan heliport

== Sources ==
- Sloan heliport
