= Jean Airport =

Airport in Nevada, United States

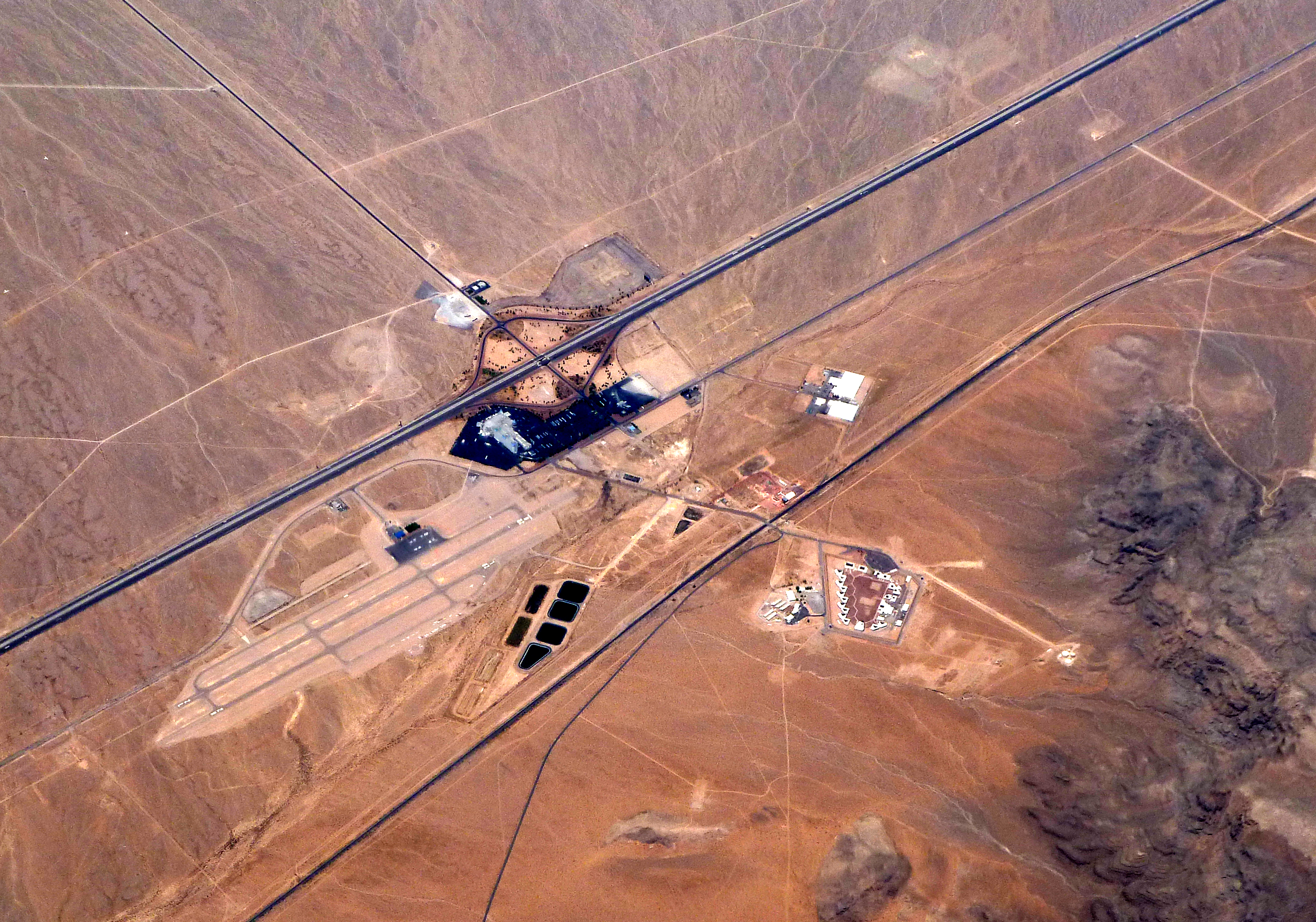
- IATA: none; ICAO: none; FAA LID: ØL7

Summary
- Airport type: Public
- Owner: Clark County Commission
- Operator: Clark County Department of Aviation
- Serves: Jean, Nevada
- Elevation AMSL: 2,835 ft (864 m)
- Coordinates: 35°46′06″N 115°19′47″W

Map
- Location of airport in Nevada ØL7 (the United States)

Runways
Direction	Length		Surface
Direction	ft	m	Surface
2L/20R	4,600	1,402	Asphalt
2R/20L	3,700	1,128	Asphalt

Statistics (2022)
- Aircraft operations (year ending 5/31/2022): 16,048
- Based aircraft: 20
- Source: Federal Aviation Administration

Jean Airport (FAA LID: ØL7) is a public use government airport located one nautical mile (2 km) south of Jean, a town in Clark County, Nevada, United States. It is owned by the Clark County Commission and operated by the Clark County Department of Aviation. Also known as Jean Sport Aviation Center, it is mainly used for sports aviation like gliders and sky diving.

The National Plan of Integrated Airport Systems for 2011–2015 categorized it as a general aviation facility.

== Facilities and aircraft ==
Jean Airport covers an area of 232 acres (94 ha) at an elevation of 2,835 feet (864 m) above mean sea level. It has two parallel runways with asphalt surfaces: 2L/20R is 4,600 by 75 feet (1,402 x 23 m) and 2R/20L is 3,700 by 60 feet (1,128 x 18 m).

For the 12-month period ending May 31, 2022, the airport had 16,048 general aviation aircraft operations, an average of 44 per day. At that time there were 20 aircraft based at this airport: 11 single-engine, 8 glider, and 1 multi-engine.

== See also ==
- List of airports in Nevada
