= Perkins Field =

Airport in Nevada, United States

Perkins Field Overton Municipal Airport
- IATA: none; ICAO: none; FAA LID: UØ8

Summary
- Airport type: Public
- Owner: Clark County Commission
- Operator: Clark County Department of Aviation
- Serves: Overton, Nevada
- Elevation AMSL: 1,366 ft (416 m)
- Coordinates: 36°34′05″N 114°26′36″W

Map
- Location of airport in Nevada UØ8 (the United States)

Runways
Direction	Length		Surface
Direction	ft	m	Surface
13/31	4,811	1,466	Asphalt

Statistics (2023)
- Aircraft operations (year ending 5/17/2023): 7,506
- Based aircraft: 17
- Source: Federal Aviation Administration

Perkins Field (FAA LID: UØ8) is a public use government airport located two nautical miles (4 km) north of the central business district of Overton, in Clark County, Nevada, United States. Also known as Overton Municipal Airport, it is owned by the Clark County Commission and operated by the Clark County Department of Aviation. The National Plan of Integrated Airport Systems for 2011–2015 categorized it as a general aviation facility.

== History ==
The airport was originally built in 1947 as an emergency landing area for aircraft leaving Nellis Air Force Base. Perkins Field is named for two local men, Woodruff and Elwood Perkins, who were killed during World War I and World War II.

== Facilities and aircraft ==
Perkins Field covers an area of 250 acres (101 ha) at an elevation of 1,366 feet (416 m) above mean sea level. It has one runway designated 13/31 with an asphalt surface measuring 4,811 by 75 feet (1,466 x 23 m).

For the 12-month period ending May 17, 2023, the airport had 7,506 aircraft operations, an average of 21 per day, 97% general aviation, and 2% military. At that time there were 17 aircraft based at this airport: 16 single-engine, and 1 multi-engine.

== See also ==
- List of airports in Nevada
