= Nevada State Route 161 =

Highway in Nevada

State Route 161
- Goodsprings Road
- Nevada State Route 161, highlighted in red

Route information
- Maintained by NDOT
- Length: 7.277 mi (11.711 km)
- Existed: July 1, 1976–present
- History: Established as SR 53 by 1935

Major junctions
- West end: Esmeralda Street in Goodsprings
- East end: I-15 in Jean

Location
- Country: United States
- State: Nevada
- County: Clark

Highway system
- Nevada State Highway System; Interstate; US; State; Pre‑1976; Scenic
← SR 160	→ SR 163

State Route 161 (SR 161) is a state highway in Clark County, Nevada. It is known as Goodsprings Road, connecting the town of Goodsprings to Interstate 15 at Jean. The route was part of State Route 53 prior to 1976.

== Route description ==
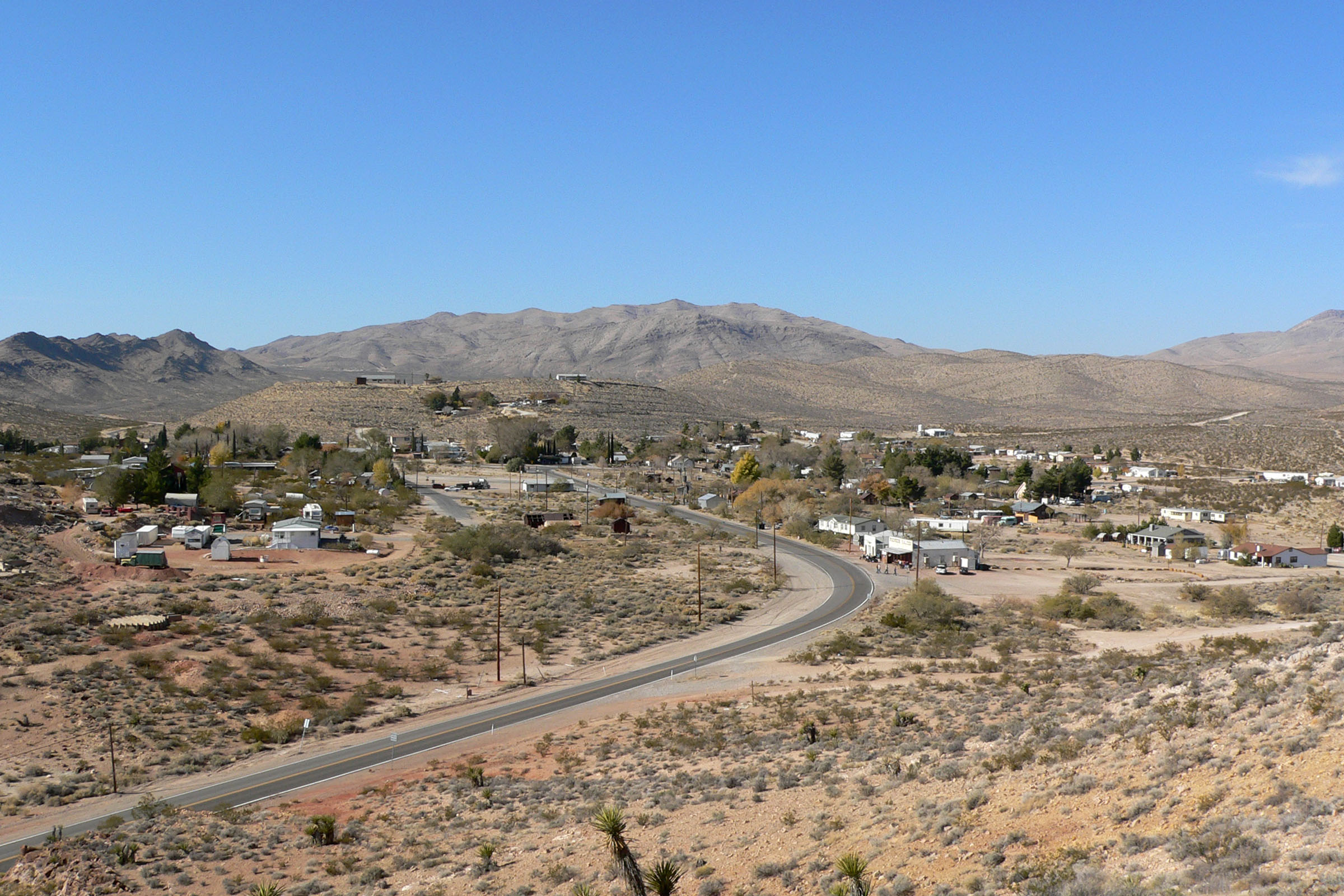
SR 161 in Goodsprings as seen in 2006

The route begins at the intersection of Esmeralda Street and Spring Street in Goodsprings. It runs east along Spring Street, then exits the town and heads southeastward, intersecting Sandy Valley Road, which provides access to Sandy Valley. The road continues southeastward through the Mojave Desert for about 7 miles (11 km) before entering Jean. SR 161 ends in Jean at an interchange with Interstate 15.

== History ==
SR 161 was originally part of State Route 53

A connection between Goodsprings and U.S. Route 91 (and SR 6) at Jean first appeared on official Nevada state maps in 1933. At that time, it was an unimproved county road. By 1935, that road was incorporated into State Route 53, which connected Jean to Goodsprings before curving southwest towards the California state line. By 1941, the first 7 miles (11 km) of the SR 53 reaching Goodsprings was paved, with the remaining 13 miles (21 km) in to Sandy Valley and on to California still unimproved.

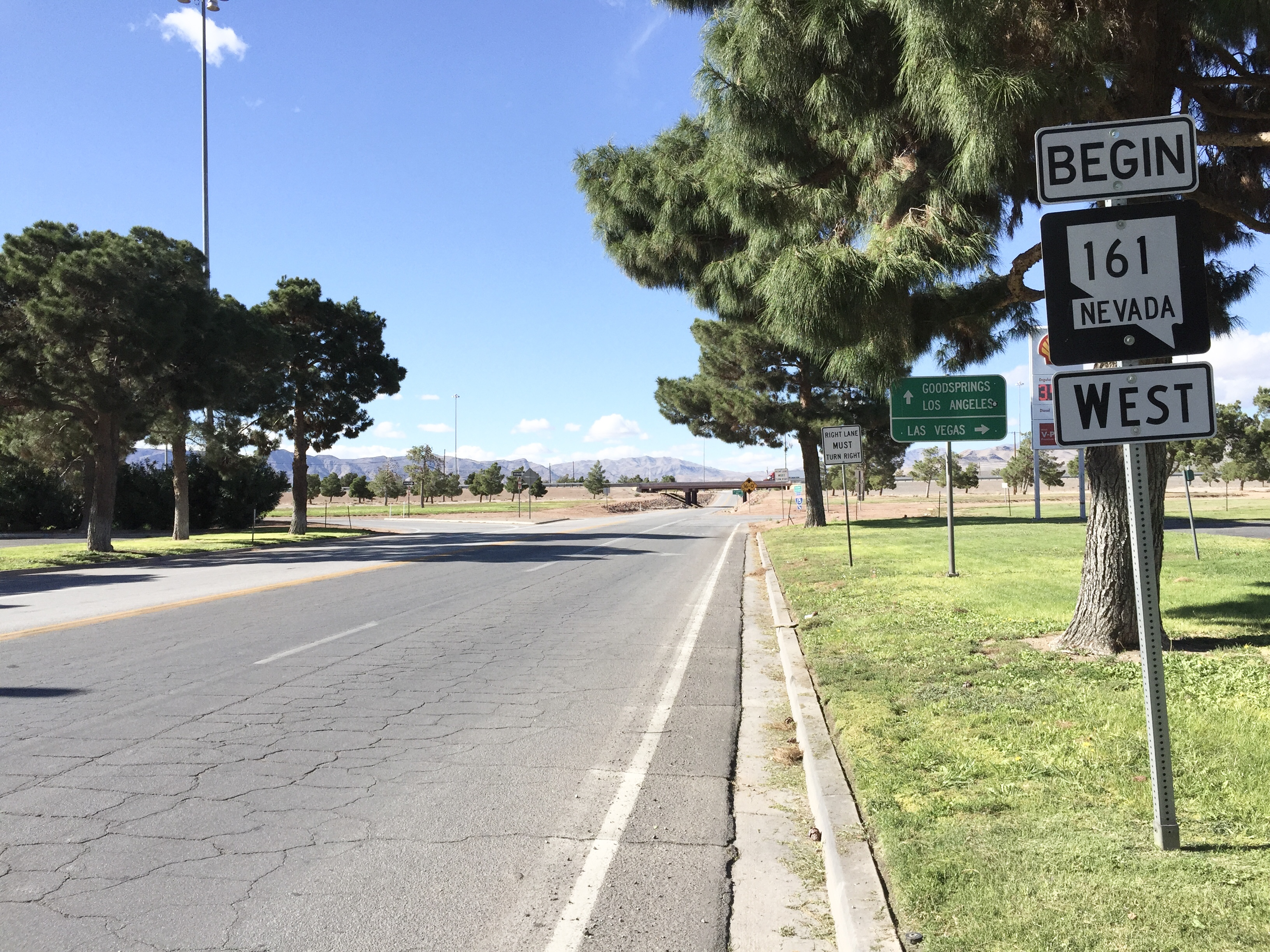
View from the east end of SR 161 looking westbound as seen in 2015

SR 53 remained unchanged until the 1976 renumbering of Nevada's state highway system that was authorized on July 1, 1976. In that process, the paved portion of the highway between Jean and Goodsprings was renumbered to State Route 161. This change was first seen on the 1978–1979 edition of the official state map The remaining section of SR 53 to Sandy Valley continued to be shown on the state map, but was dropped from the state system by 1982. Sandy Valley is now reachable via the Sandy Valley Road turnoff from SR 161, prior to entering Goodsprings.

== Major intersections ==
The entire route is in Clark County.

Location	mi	km	Destinations	Notes
Goodsprings	0.000	0.000	Esmeralda Street	Western terminus
Goodsprings			Sandy Valley Road – Sandy Valley	Former SR 53 south
Jean	7.277	11.711	I-15 (Las Vegas Freeway) – Los Angeles, Las Vegas	Interchange; eastern terminus; I-15 exit 12
Jean	7.277	11.711	Main Street to Las Vegas Boulevard	Continuation beyond eastern terminus
1.000 mi = 1.609 km; 1.000 km = 0.621 mi
