= Jean, Nevada =

Jean
- Town
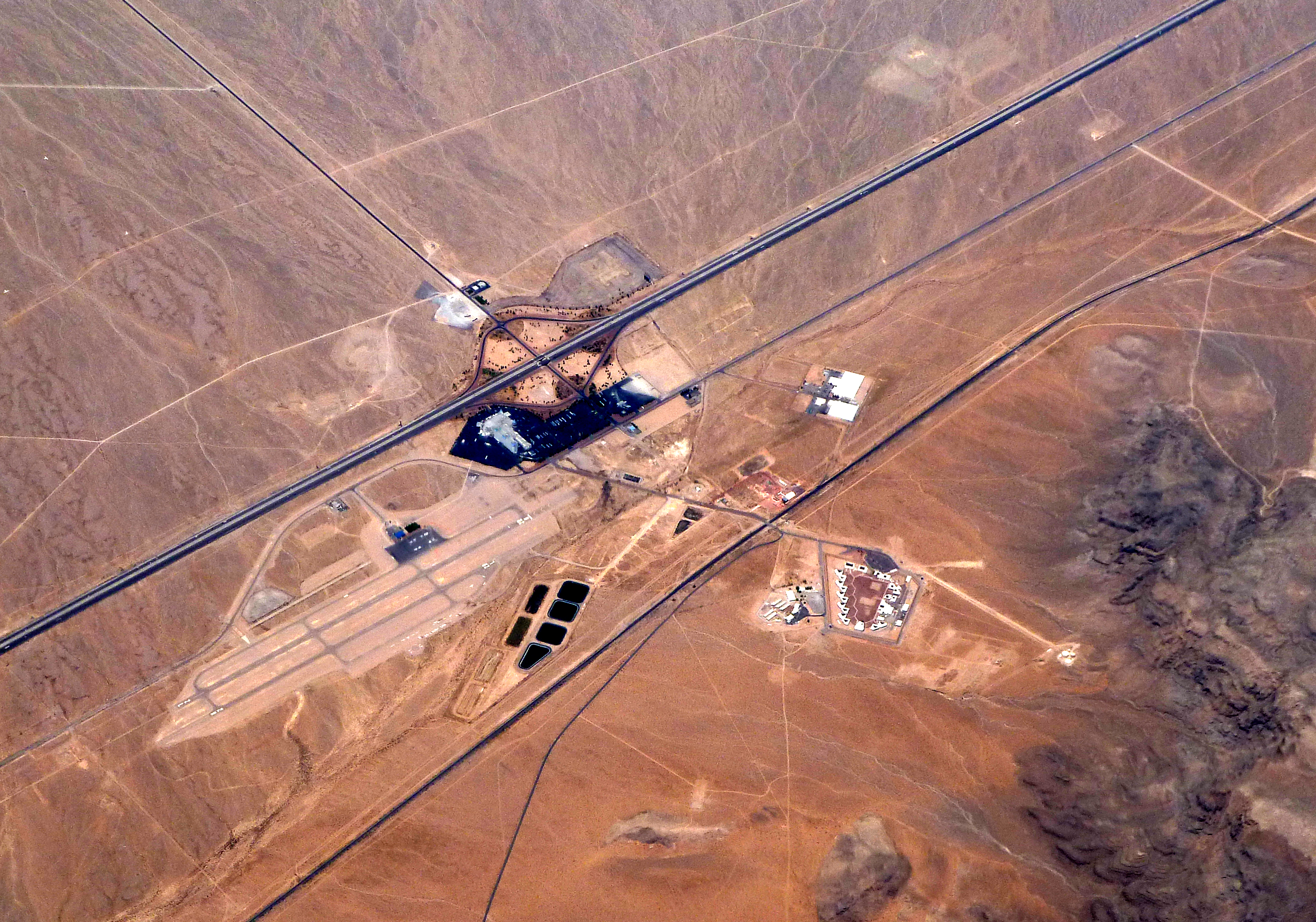
- Aerial view of Jean (June 2010)

- Location within the state of Nevada
- Coordinates: 35°46′48″N 115°19′48″W
- Country: United States
- State: Nevada
- County: Clark
- Founded: 1904; 122 years ago
- Founder: Lincoln County Commission
- Named for: Jean Fayle
- Elevation: 2,841 ft (866 m)

Population (2010)
  - Total: 0
- Time zone: UTC-8 (PST)
  - Summer (DST): UTC-7 (PDT)
- ZIP code: 89019
- Area codes: 702 and 725

Jean is a small commercial town in Clark County, Nevada, United States, located about 20 miles (32 km) south of the Las Vegas hotel-casino corridor along Interstate 15 and 12 mi (19 km) north of Primm, Nevada, near the state line with California.

No land in Jean is zoned residential. The town is primarily zoned commercial, industrial, manufacturing, government, and institutional. A 3 million-square-foot mega-warehouse complex is currently in development at the Jean exit on Interstate 15 (I-15).

Jean will also be the entry point for the Southern Nevada Supplemental Airport, which is currently in development.

Jean is accessible via I-15, as well as from Las Vegas Boulevard South, and from the towns of Goodsprings and Sandy Valley via State Route 161.

== Overview ==
According to the Nevada Department of Transportation, over 16 million vehicles travel through Jean on I-15 between Las Vegas and California annually.

Jean is home to the world's largest Chevron gas station, in Terrible's Road House, with 96 pumps, a 50,000-square-foot convenience store, a restaurant, and an electric vehicle charging station. There are other businesses, including the Jean Sport Aviation Center and the Jean Airport. The town also houses a Nevada State Police Highway Patrol substation, the Jean Post Office, the Goodsprings Township Courthouse, a Clark County Fire Station, and the Jean Conservation Camp, a women's minimum-security prison. The Nevada Department of Corrections plans to close this facility by July 1, 2026.

== History ==
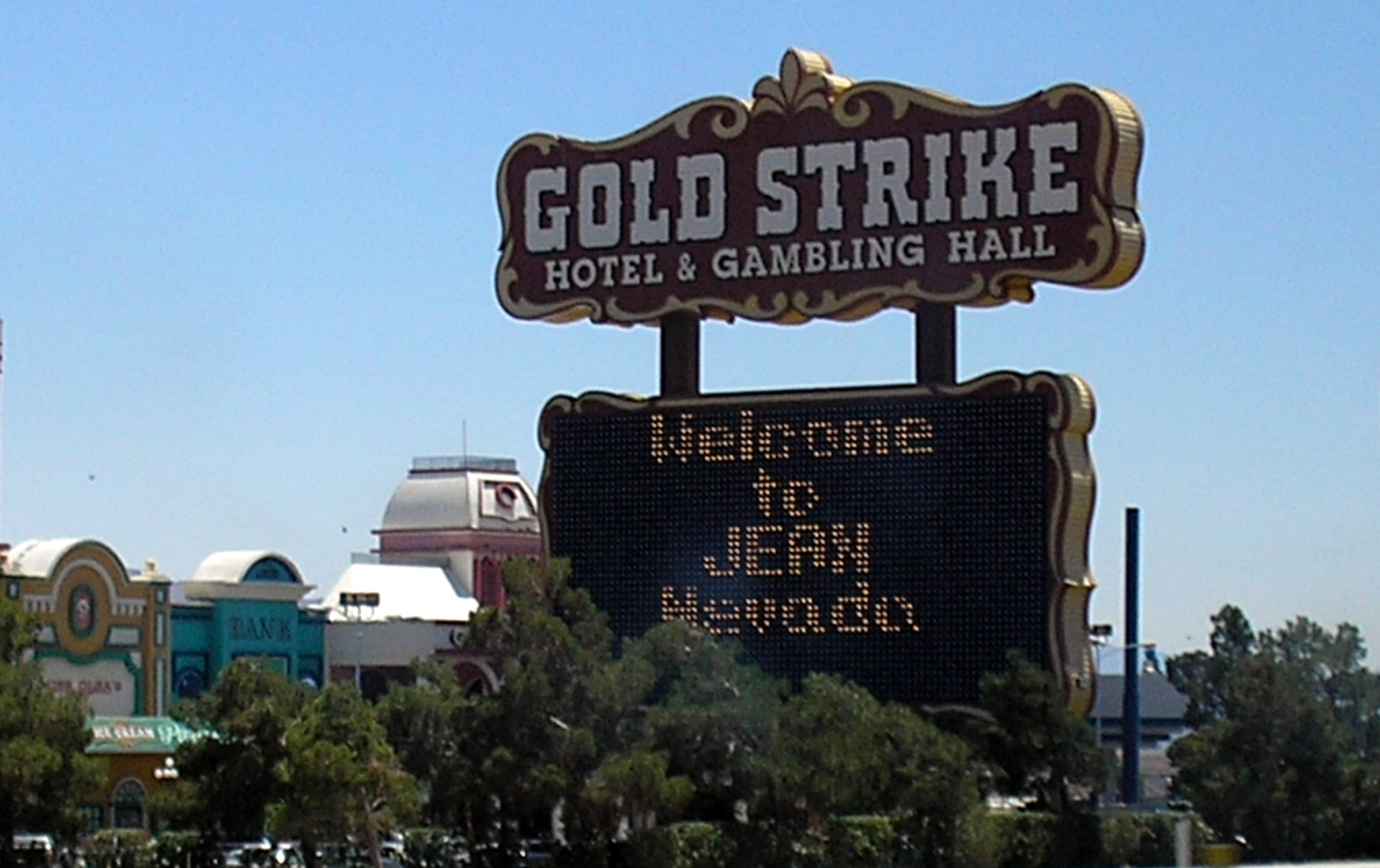
The Gold Strike Casino in Jean closed in 2020

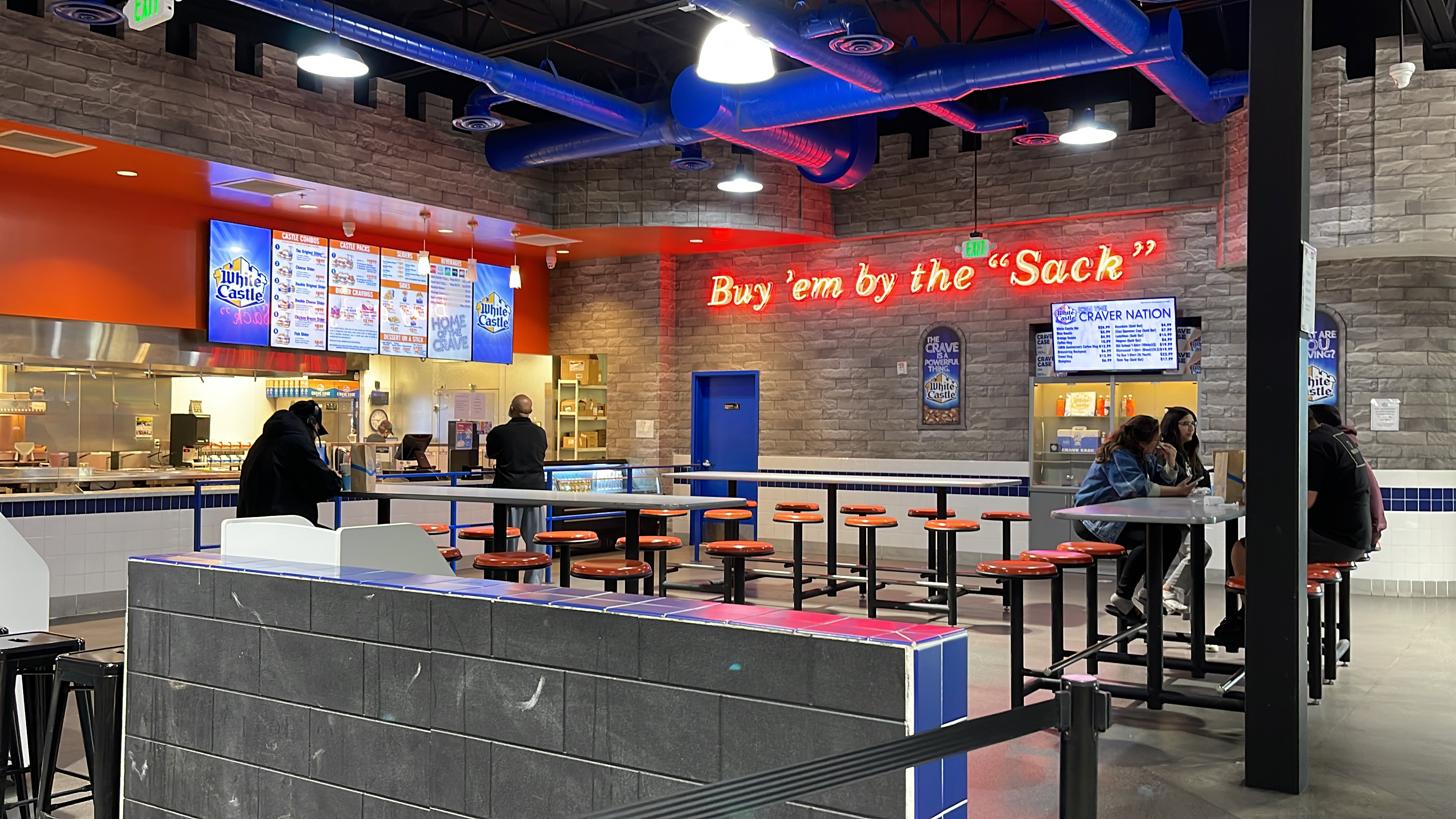
A White Castle restaurant inside Terrible's Road House, the world's largest Chevron gas station, in Jean

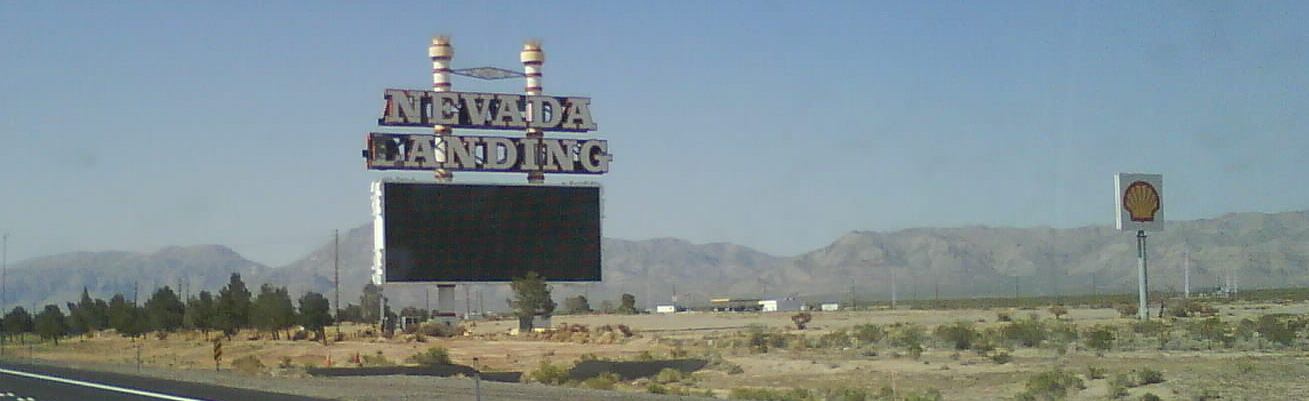
The sign marking the location of the former Nevada Landing Casino

Jean was originally named Goodsprings Junction. On June 28, 1905, postmaster George Arthur Fayle renamed the town Jean in honor of his wife, Jean Frost Fayle (1883-1950). He also built the famous Pioneer Saloon in Goodsprings.

Pop's Oasis Casino was the first casino to open in Jean in 1972. Two other casinos, the Nevada Landing Hotel and Casino and the Gold Strike Hotel and Casino were opened later. Pop's Oasis closed in 1988 and was demolished. Chips and tokens from Pop's Oasis were poured into the foundation of the Nevada Landing Hotel and Casino, which subsequently closed in 2007, and the property was leveled in May 2008.

The Gold Strike remained open and was renamed Terrible's Hotel and Casino in 2018.

Terrible's closed in 2020 during the pandemic and was sold to Tolles Development in 2022. The site, along with several other large adjacent parcels, is now being developed into a 3 million-square-foot mega warehouse complex.

The Las Vegas welcome center in Jean was moved to Primm in early 2000, and the building in Jean was converted in 2004 to the current Nevada State Police substation.

== Geography ==
Jean is located on a mountain pass, Jean Pass (south), west of the Jean Dry Lake basin. Sheep Mountain borders Jean to the east, southeast of Jean Dry Lake. Northwest of the pass lies the southeast foothills of the Bird Spring Range.

== In popular culture ==
In 2016, Ugo Rondinone built Seven Magic Mountains, a popular tourist attraction near Las Vegas.

Jean has been featured in popular Hollywood movies and music videos:

- Lionheart featuring Jean-Claude VanDamme, 1990 film
- Casino, 1995 film
- Vegas Vacation, 1997 film
- Fear and Loathing in Las Vegas, 1998 film
- Pearl Harbor, 2001 film
- The Hangover, 2009 film
- The Master, 2012 film
- Absolute Dominion, Netflix film 2022
- Kelsey Ballerini's music video "Peter Pan" (2015)

Jean is featured in the 2010 video game Fallout: New Vegas.

== See also ==
- Jean Pass (north)
