= Henderson Executive Airport =

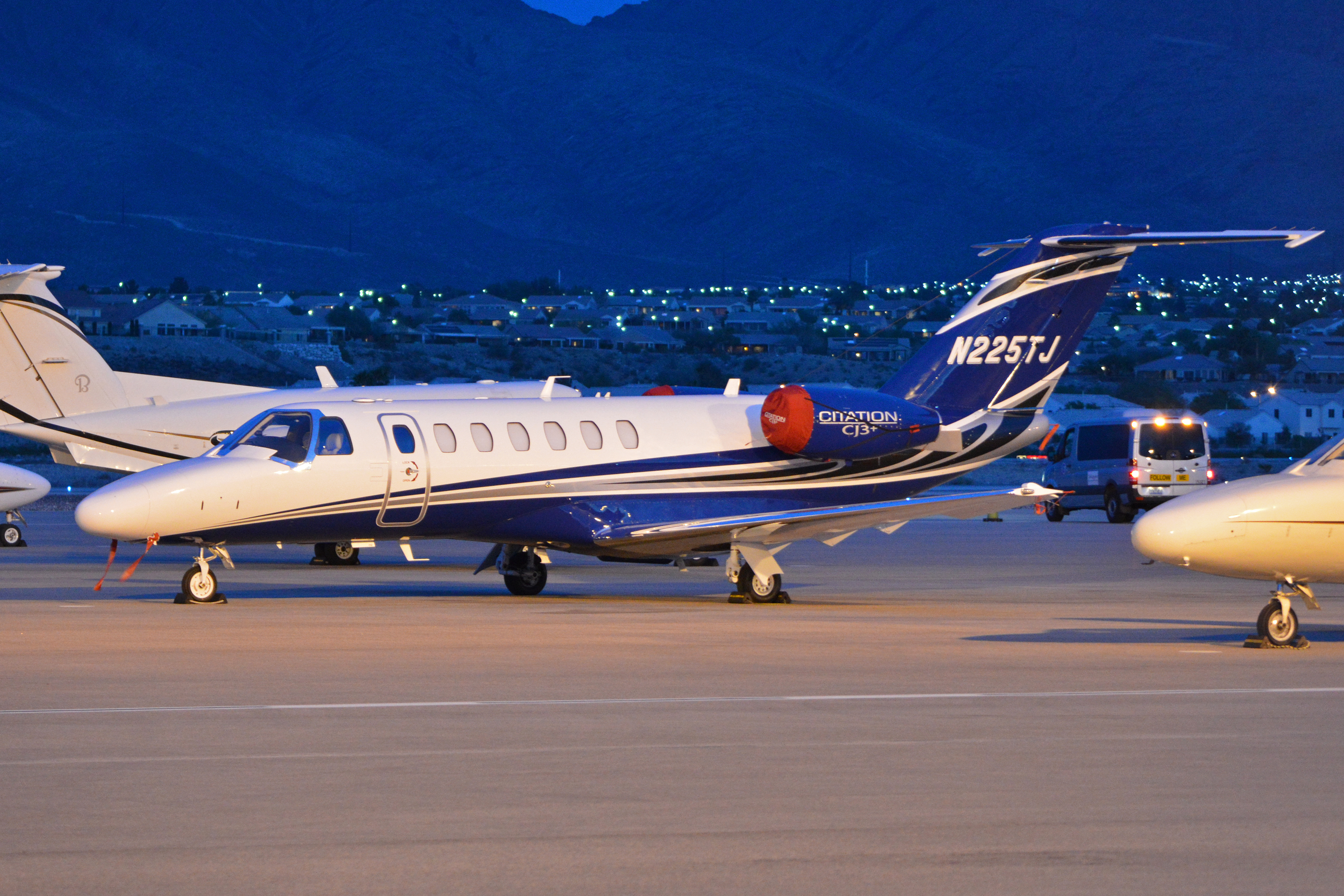
- IATA: HSH; ICAO: KHND; FAA LID: HND

Summary
- Airport type: Public
- Owner: Clark County Commission
- Operator: Clark County Department of Aviation
- Serves: Las Vegas
- Location: Henderson, Nevada
- Elevation AMSL: 2,491 ft (759 m)
- Coordinates: 35°58′22″N 115°08′04″W
- Website: www.hnd.aero

Map
- Location within Nevada Location within the United States

Runways
Direction	Length		Surface
Direction	ft	m	Surface
17R/35L	6,501	1,982	Asphalt
17L/35R	5,001	1,524	Asphalt

Statistics (May 2021 - May 2022)
- Aircraft operations: 78,000
- Based aircraft: 256
- Source: Federal Aviation Administration

Henderson Executive Airport (IATA: HSH, ICAO: KHND, FAA LID: HND) is a public use government airport located in Henderson, Nevada, 13 miles south of Las Vegas, in Clark County, Nevada. The airport is owned by the Clark County Commission and is operated by the Clark County Department of Aviation. The FAA's National Plan of Integrated Airport Systems for 2009-2013 categorized it as a reliever airport.

It was founded by Arby Alper in 1967 on 912 acres purchased from the city of Henderson, and opened in 1970 as Sky Harbor Airport. Clark County bought the airport in 1996 and renamed it Henderson Executive Airport.

Most U.S. airports use the same three-letter location identifier for the FAA and IATA, but Henderson Executive Airport is HND to the FAA and HSH to the IATA (which assigned HND to Haneda Airport in Tokyo, Japan). The airport's ICAO identifier is KHND.

== Facilities ==
The airport covers 760 acres (310 ha) at an elevation of 2,491 feet (759 m). It has two asphalt runways: 17R/35L is 6,501 by 100 feet (1,982 m × 30 m) and 17L/35R is 5,001 by 75 feet (1,524 m × 23 m).

In the year ending May 31, 2022 the airport had 78,000 aircraft operations, average 214 per day: 79% general aviation, 21% air taxi and <1% military. 256 aircraft were then based at the airport: 193 single-engine, 22 multi-engine, 38 jet and 3 helicopter.

The terminal has car rental, flight school, line service facilities and the Landings Restaurant.

== See also ==
- List of airports in Nevada
