= North Las Vegas Airport =

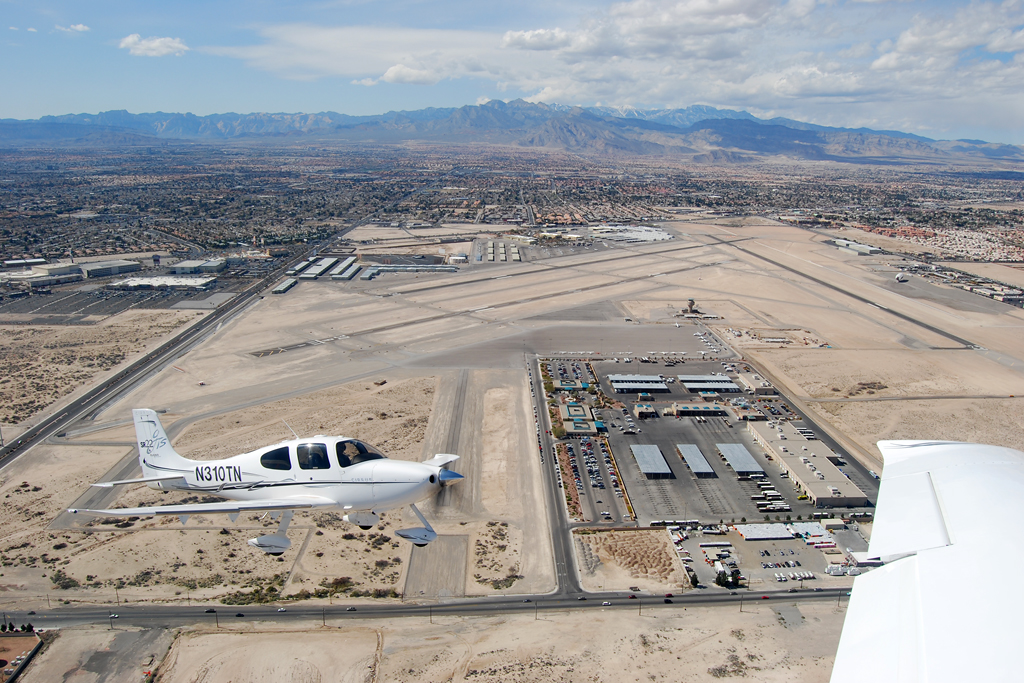
- View from an SR22 aircraft over North Las Vegas Airport, March 2013
- IATA: VGT; ICAO: KVGT; FAA LID: VGT

Summary
- Airport type: Public
- Owner: Clark County Commission
- Operator: Clark County Department of Aviation
- Serves: Las Vegas
- Location: North Las Vegas, Nevada, U.S.
- Opened: December 7, 1941; 84 years ago
- Elevation AMSL: 2,205 ft / 672 m
- Coordinates: 36°12′38″N 115°11′40″W
- Website: www.vgt.aero

Maps
- Location of airport in Nevada / United States VGT/KVGT/VGT (the United States)

Runways
Direction	Length		Surface
Direction	ft	m	Surface
7/25	5,005	1,525	Asphalt
12R/30L	5,001	1,524	Asphalt
12L/30R	4,203	1,281	Asphalt

Statistics (2022)
- Aircraft operations: 176,320
- Based aircraft: 492
- Source: Federal Aviation Administration

North Las Vegas Airport (IATA: VGT, ICAO: KVGT, FAA LID: VGT) is a public-use airport 3 mi (4.8 km) northwest of downtown Las Vegas in North Las Vegas, Nevada. It is owned by the Clark County Commission and operated by the Clark County Department of Aviation.

Known locally as Northtown, it is the second–busiest public use government airport in the Las Vegas area and the third busiest in Nevada. It is the primary airport in the Las Vegas area for general aviation and scenic tours, allowing Harry Reid International Airport to focus on airline flights. North Las Vegas offered limited regional airline service by Grand Canyon Scenic Airlines in the early 2000s. Many helicopter operators, including the Las Vegas Metropolitan Police Department, use the airport.

== History ==
The airport opened on December 7, 1941, as Sky Haven Airport. Due to the attack on Pearl Harbor which occurred the same day, two of the airport's co-founders, Verald "Bud" Barrett and J. M. Murphy, left to enlist in the Army Air Corps, leaving the third co-founder, Florence Murphy, to run the airport until 1945.

During an expansion project at the airport, Sky Rider Motel opened in the early 1960s featuring a swimming pool shaped like an airplane.

In 1968, Hughes Tool Company purchased the airport, then called North Las Vegas Air Terminal.

From the latter 1970s through the 1990s, Las Vegas Airlines provided scheduled flights to the Grand Canyon National Park airport.

From 2003 through 2006 Scenic Airlines operated commercial flights to the Grand Canyon. Service to Ely and Elko, Nevada and to Merced and Visalia, California was also flown under the federally subsidized Essential Air Service program.

== Facilities ==
North Las Vegas Airport covers 920 acres (370 ha) at an elevation of 2,205 feet (672 m). It has three asphalt runways: 7/25 is 5,005 by 75 feet (1,525 x 23 m), 12R/30L is 5,001 by 75 feet (1,524 x 23 m), and 12L/30R is 4,203 by 75 feet (1,281 x 23 m).

In the year ending August 31, 2019, the airport averaged 483 aircraft operations per day, or just over 176,000 per year: 59% local general aviation, 29% transient general aviation, 11% air taxi and <1% of both commercial and military. As of August, 2015, there were 536 aircraft based at this airport: 76% single-engine, 14% multi-engine, 4% jet, 6% helicopter and <1% ultralight.

== Incidents and accidents ==
- On August 30, 1978, Las Vegas Airlines Flight 44, a Piper PA-31-350 Navajo Chieftain (N44LV), crashed in VFR conditions shortly after takeoff from runway 25. Flight 44 was a charter flight from Las Vegas, Nevada, to Santa Ana, California, with nine Australian tourists and a pilot on board. After liftoff following a longer-than-normal ground roll, the aircraft pitched nose up, climbed steeply to about 400 ft above the ground, stalled, reversed course, and crashed 1,150 ft beyond and 650 ft to the right of the runway. All persons on board the aircraft were killed. The National Transportation Safety Board determined that the probable cause of the accident was a backed out elevator down-stop bolt that limited down elevator travel and made it impossible for the pilot to prevent a pitchup and stall after takeoff.
- On January 2, 2013, a twin-engine Piper Aerostar crashed and burst into flames at North Las Vegas Airport after a hard landing. The two occupants escaped uninjured.
- On July 17, 2022, two single-engine aircraft – a Piper PA-46 Malibu and a Cessna 172 – collided in mid-air in the traffic pattern at the airport. Two people were onboard each aircraft, and all four died. Preliminary reports indicate that the Piper was preparing to land when it hit the 172, and ADSB data shows that the Malibu overshot its final approach course, encroaching on the path of the Cessna, which was landing on a parallel runway.

== See also ==
- List of airports in Nevada
