= World Series of Golf (unofficial event) =

Poker-style golf competition

The World Series of Golf is a golf competition. The competition differs from traditional golf tournaments in that the winner is decided not by the lowest stroke-play score or by winning a bracket-style elimination in match play, but by winning wagers bet on each hole in a betting style similar to poker.

The first event was held on May 13–16, 2007, at the Primm Valley Golf Club near Primm, Nevada, and was later televised by NBC on June 23–24. The second event was played on May 12–15, 2008, and was televised by CBS on June 28–29. A third event was played in May 2009 at the Las Vegas Paiute Golf Resort, with television coverage scheduled on WGN America. In 2025, the organization announced a two-year partnership with the Skip Barber Racing School to hold events at Gran Reserva, a resort estate in Ixtapan de la Sal, Mexico, with the first year planned for 2026. In July 2026, Topgolf announced a qualifying series for the World Series of Golf championship at 30 of its venues in the United States.

== Format ==
Each hole is conducted in a manner similar to a hand of Texas hold 'em. Each player begins the round with a stake, and a playing group consists of three to six players. In the inaugural tournament, the buy-in for each player was $10,000.

Before teeing off for each hole, each player bets an ante, which starts out at 1% of the opening stake for the round, i.e., $100 on the first hole of the opening round, and doubles every three holes. After the tee shots, players then check, raise or call bets, or fold and do not play the rest of that hole. Betting follows a prescribed order that rotates on each hole, just like "the button" in Hold 'Em, and playing of shots follows the same order, unlike traditional golf where the player whose ball is furthest from the hole shoots first on each shot. The pot is won by the player with the lowest score on each hole, or by the remaining player if all others have folded. A tie score on a hole ("halved" in match-play parlance) results in a split pot, much like a tie hand in poker. If a player does not have enough money remaining in his or her stake to cover the ante for the next hole, he or she is eliminated and the remaining stake goes into the pot for the next hole.

The round ends when one player has won all the money from the others in his group, which may take more than 18 holes.

Aside from rule variations involving betting and the order in which players take their shots, the event is played under standard United States Golf Association rules.

The inaugural event was open to amateur golfers only. Players were paired with those of similar ability for the first round, which was played without handicaps. Handicap scoring was used for second and third rounds.

Players had to be at least 21 years old. In 2009, amateurs were eligible if they had not previously won more than $50,000 playing golf.

In 2009, winners of the first-round pairings advanced to the second round and recovered their $10,000 entry fee. Winners of the second-round pairings reached the final round and were guaranteed at least $30,000, and the event winner received $300,000.

== 2007 World Series of Golf ==
The event was held at the Primm Valley Golf Club near Primm, Nevada. A field of 60 participants played three rounds. The winner received $250,000.

=== Results ===
Winner: Mark Ewing, a day trader from Newport Beach, California

Others in final group were Phil Ivey, professional poker player, Las Vegas; Rhett Butler, professional poker player, Rockville, Maryland; Paul Schuller, electrician, Seattle, Washington; and Ken Tanner, retired railroad conductor, Penrose, Colorado.

Ewing won the event on the 16th hole of the final round. He went all-in on his approach shot to the par-4 hole, chipped onto the green and sank a three-foot putt, eliminating Ivey and Butler.

Other notable entrants were actress Tanya Roberts; poker players Phil Gordon, Steve Dannenmann, Ken Einiger and Blair Rodman; professional blackjack player/author Max Rubin; former Denver Broncos quarterback Dave Kyle; and former Major League Baseball player Dusty Allen.

== 2008 World Series of Golf ==
The 2008 event was played on May 12–15, at the Las Vegas Paiute Golf Resort. The event drew 80 contestants. Players competed in groups of four until one player had eliminated the other three, and five players reached the final round.

=== Results ===
Winner: Andrew "A.J." Johnson, a 36-year-old automobile salesman, Davison, Michigan

Others in final group were Allen Cunningham, Erick Lindgren and Dee Tiller, all professional poker players, and Bill Spencer, a semi-retired builder. All but Johnson are from Las Vegas.

Johnson defeated Lindgren on the first playoff hole, a 163-yard par three. Johnson won $250,000, and Lindgren won $60,000.

Other notable entrants:

- Comedian Ray Romano
- Emily Jillette, wife of magician Penn Jillette of Penn and Teller
- Phil Gordon, Phil Ivey, Tom Schneider, Daniel Negreanu and Chris Ferguson, professional poker players

== 2009 World Series of Golf ==
The third World Series of Golf was played at the Las Vegas Paiute Golf Resort in the week of May 11, 2009, the second consecutive year at that venue. It was sponsored by Full Tilt Poker. The entry fee was $10,000 and the field was capped at 125 players.

The winner's prize was raised from $250,000 to $300,000. Card Player reported $700,000 in total payouts, with the top 25 players paid. A preview listed Ray Romano, John Daly, Phil Gordon, Phil Ivey, Daniel Negreanu, Chris Ferguson and Erick Lindgren among the expected participants.

=== Planned high-stakes event ===
In May 2008, the organizers announced plans for a high-stakes version of the event in 2009 with a $200,000 entry fee. It was to have 25 paid entries and five entries awarded by random draw to players in the $10,000 event, and the winner was to receive $1.5 million.

== Television ==
The 2008 event was broadcast on CBS under a three-year agreement between the organizers and the network. In April 2009, the organizers left that agreement and signed with WGN America, a cable network owned by Tribune Broadcasting, to air the 2009 event as 13 one-hour episodes. WGN America scheduled the first broadcasts for June 27–28, 2009, with encore presentations through September 19–20. Terry Leiweke, president of the World Series of Golf, said cable offered more flexibility than the CBS arrangement.

== 2026 revival ==
=== Skip Barber partnership ===
In 2025, the World Series of Golf and the Skip Barber Racing School announced a two-year partnership at Gran Reserva in Ixtapan de la Sal, Mexico, where the school was developing a racing resort. Under the plan, the first year, 2026, would feature the World Series of Golf championship while the racetrack was under construction, and the second year would add driving of sports cars on the completed circuit. The events were described as invitation-only. Robert Davidman is the chief executive of the World Series of Golf.

=== Topgolf qualifying series ===
In July 2026, Topgolf and the World Series of Golf announced a qualifying series at 30 Topgolf venues in 11 states. According to Topgolf, players would compete hole by hole using betting mechanics in the World Series of Golf app, across nine holes of Topgolf's virtual golf mode, in qualifying events on September 1 and 2, 2026. The winner at each venue was to be invited to a national championship at Topgolf Scottsdale in Scottsdale, Arizona, on October 2, and the winner of that event would receive a seat in the World Series of Golf championship, which Topgolf described as carrying a top prize of up to $250,000.
