= Mati Moralejo =

American actor (born 1975)

- Born: July 14, 1975 (age 51)
- Occupations: Host, actor
- Years active: 1993–present

Matthew John Moralejo is an American actor and he is best known as a recurring personality on the Nick GAS television network from early to mid 2000s. He is regularly seen in 60 second featurettes highlighting lesser known sports from around the world called Global GAS.

Moralejo was also the host of a short-lived revival of Nickelodeon's Wild and Crazy Kids in 2002. As an actor, he has had guest roles in Dawson's Creek, From the Earth to the Moon and The Mystery Files of Shelby Woo.

Moralejo grew up in the Town and Country area of Tampa, Florida, and graduated A.P. Leto High School in 1993. He teaches international sports such as shovel racing, hydrospeeding, zorbing, pato, Kendo, reindeer racing, Futvolei, ice mountain climbing, dog sled racing, snow biking, outrigger canoeing, and sand tobogganing.

Alongside Max Rubin, Moralejo co-hosted two seasons of the Ultimate Blackjack Tour on CBS, a blackjack tournament that used the Elimination Blackjack derivative created by poker player and World Series of Poker bracelet winner Russ Hamilton and featured a number of famous poker players and professional gamblers amongst it participants. Anthony Curtis, owner of the Las Vegas Advisor analyzed all televised play and wrote the commentary delivered by Moralejo and Rubin.
