= Anthony Curtis (writer) =

American gambler and author

- Born: c. 1958 (age 67–68)
- Occupation: Writer
- Writing career
- Subject: Gambling
- Website: Official website

Anthony Curtis (born c. 1958) is an American blackjack player, gambler, author and publisher. He publishes the Las Vegas Advisor, a newsletter founded in 1983 that covers discounts in Las Vegas, and Huntington Press, a publishing house that has released books about gambling, as well as true crime, including The Killing of Tupac Shakur, a Los Angeles Times bestseller by author Cathy Scott.

== Early life and education ==
Curtis became interested in gambling at age 16 when he read How to Win at Blackjack by Charles Einstein.

After dropping out of Duke University, Curtis moved to Las Vegas in 1979 shortly before turning 21 to pursue gambling professionally.

== Career ==
He participated in a team run by Stanford Wong that engaged in tournament play in and around Las Vegas and is known to have won $72k after placing first at a Matchplay Blackjack tournament at the Las Vegas Hilton.

Curtis has appeared on the Travel Channel, Discovery, NBC, A&E and BBC, as well as on televised blackjack events such as the World Series of Blackjack and the Ultimate Blackjack Tour, the latter of which he provided the analyses of play and wrote the commentary that was presented by Max Rubin and Mati Moralejo.

He was the winner at Max Rubin's 2017 Blackjack Ball for the title of "The Best Gambler in the World."

In 2020, he was inducted into the Blackjack Hall of Fame.
