= Rafe Furst =

American entrepreneur and poker player

- Occupations: Poker player, entrepreneur
- Website: http://www.rafefurst.com/

Rafe Furst is an American entrepreneur, writer, and world champion poker player.

Furst is known for winning the 2006 World Series of Poker Championship Bracelet in Pot Limit Hold-em, earning over $350,000 in prize money.

He has written and spoken about the transformation of early-stage finance and cryptocurrency in articles and interviews, and has presented at consortiums and conferences that include TED.

Furst's ideas pertaining to technology, cancer research, and investing have been featured in WIRED, New York Times Magazine, and Stephen J. Dubner and Steven D. Levitt's Freakonomics blog.

== Education and early career ==
He began his career in the 1990s as an artificial intelligence researcher at the Kestrel Institute.

== Entrepreneurship and investing ==
Furst left academia to co-found his first company, Pick'em Sports, in 1996, which was sold to a public company in 1999.

== Philanthropy and cancer work ==
Furst has served on the board of directors at the Prevent Cancer Foundation and the Conrad Foundation, as well as on the Board of Advisors at the Decision Education Foundation and Unreasonable Institute.

He has additionally served as a Mentor at Sandbox, StartingBloc, and the Thiel Fellowship, created by PayPal co-founder and billionaire Peter Thiel.

In 2003, Furst and his friend Phil Gordon launched the Bad Beat on Cancer initiative which encourages poker players to pledge 1% of their winnings to prevent cancer. Since inception, Bad Beat on Cancer has raised over $3.4 million.

In 2007, Furst received the award for Excellence in Cancer Awareness, and in March 2010, he received the 2nd Annual Cancer Champion Award.

In 2021, Furst published a peer-reviewed article in Progress in Biophysics and Molecular Biology titled "The Importance of Henry H. Heng's Genome Architecture Theory" and appeared the next year in Research Features alongside Henry Heng in a profile titled "Genome Architecture Theory Shakes Up Cancer Research," which is featured by the National Institutes of Health."

== Writing and media ==
In October 2009, Furst wrote about an experiment that he and Phil Gordon undertook to invest in the lifetime future income of Furst's brother-in-law, filmmaker Jon Gunn. The article went viral and was picked up by WIRED and Reuters, Shortly thereafter, additional individuals began selling portions of their future income streams.

In 2010, Furst spoke at the TEDActive Conference about the experiment.

== Poker career ==
Furst began playing poker in middle school and started a home poker game while at Stanford that continues to this day. The group, calling themselves The Tiltboys, became known for their gambling antics and published a book in 2005 titled Tales From the Tiltboys.

In 2005, Furst won the Ultimate Poker Challenge. One year later, he won a World Series of Poker event in Pot-Limit Hold'em. All told, Furst has won or cashed in thirteen professional tournaments.

Furst was an investor and founder of Full Tilt Poker, which eventually became the world's second largest online poker site. Furst was a sponsored player on the site and could be seen sporting the Full Tilt Poker logo often in televised events and interviews between 2005 and 2010.

On September 20, 2011, Furst was named as a defendant in a complaint by the U.S. Department of Justice against Tiltware, LLC, the parent company of Full Tilt Poker. On November 28, 2012, Furst settled the case, and while the exact settlement amount is unknown, the agreement stipulates no liability for Furst, and the case was dismissed with prejudice.

Beginning with the Bad Beat on Cancer initiative in 2003, Furst has hosted or appeared in many charity poker events benefiting causes that include Talk About Curing Autism, Ante Up for Africa, and XPRIZE Foundation.

Furst is also a poker teacher and author, having coached celebrities for Celebrity Poker Showdown, written chapters in the Full Tilt Poker Strategy Guide, and produced Expert Insight: Final Table Poker.

== Adventure travel ==
Furst is an extreme sports amateur enthusiast. An adventure travel guide features a chapter about backpacking in the High Sierras with Furst.
