= David Matthews (blackjack player) =

David Matthews is an American professional blackjack player and writer. He has competed in the World Series of Blackjack and is the winner of the second season of the CBS elimination blackjack tournament series Ultimate Blackjack Tour. Around 2007, he wrote articles on blackjack and tournament strategy for All In magazine.
