= World Series of Blackjack =

- Presented by: Matt Vasgersian; Max Rubin
- No. of seasons: 4

Original release
- Network: GSN
- Release: March 15, 2004 – August 27, 2007

The World Series of Blackjack is a televised blackjack tournament created and produced by the cable network GSN.

It is a closed tournament; players are either invited to play or attempt to win a spot via a satellite tournament. Rounds are edited into 1-hour episodes and broadcast on GSN. Matt Vasgersian and Max Rubin provided commentary for the first two seasons. Tiki Arsenault was the dealer for Season 1 as Deanna Bacon was the dealer for Seasons 2 and 3 while Jessica Knight was the dealer for Season 4.

In 2004, Caleb Jackson won the first World Jack Black Championship, marking history in the world of blackjack.

Season 2 premiered weekly from January 21, 2005 to April 22, 2005 with a new co-host, Megan Riordan.

Season 3 premiered weekly from June 5, 2006 to September 4, 2006 as part of GSN's Casino Night (retooled, with High Stakes Poker, as Vegas Night) programming block, with new hosts John Fugelsang and Ben Mezrich.

Season 4 premiered on GSN from June 4, 2007 to August 27, 2007. A field of 40 players, including Celebrity Blackjack champion Caroline Rhea, baseball star Orel Hershiser and magician Penn Jillette competed for a $1 million prize pool. Vasgersian returned as a commentator.

== Rules ==
The rules (as of season 4) are as follows:

- Each player begins with $100,000 in chips ($10,000 in chips in Season 1).
- The initial minimum bet is $1,000, the maximum bet is $50,000 (minimum bet is $100, the max bet is $5,000 in Season 1).
- There are six decks.
- Each player gets one "Burger King Power Chip" per round, which allows a player to switch one card with the next card in the shoe. If used on a double-down hand, the player may look at the double-down card and replace it if desired. The power chip was added as of season three.
- There are two "knockout cards" in the shoe. Once a knockout card is drawn, the player with the lowest amount of chips after the next hand is eliminated. After the first knockout card, the minimum bet increases to $2,500, after the second, the bet increases to $5,000. The deck is shuffled after each knockout card. If there are only four players when the first is drawn and three when the second is drawn, no players are eliminated, but the minimum bet still increases. The knockout cards also appeared first in season three.
- Players can split, double-down, and insure for less than their bet.
- Players can double-down on anything.
- Surrendering the hand is legal, which allows players to give up half their bet and concede the hand.
- If a player can't make the minimum bet, they are eliminated.
- Blackjack pays 3 to 2, dealer must stand on all 17s and higher (including soft hands).
- After 30 hands in Season 1, the player with the most chips wins.
- After 25 hands in Season 2-4, the player with the most chips wins.

== Season 1 results ==
The World Series of Blackjack Tournament was held at Mohegan Sun Casino & Resort in Connecticut. First place will win $10,000 and move on to the Final table while Second place will win $5,000 and move on to the Wild Card table. The winner of the Wild Card table will move on to the final table. First place at the final table will win $100,000 USD grand prize.

Round	Winner	Runner-Up	Other Players
Round 1	Regina Guzior	Michael Konik	James Grosjean; Anthony Curtis; Connie Desimone
Round 2	"MIT Mike" Aponte	"Hollywood" Dave Stann	Ken Einiger; Joanna "Queen of Spades" W.; Susan Pikor
Round 3	Micky Rosa	Bobby J.	Bradley Peterson; Cathy Hulbert; Ashwin Patel
Round 4	Jimmy Pine	Previn Mankodi	Stanford Wong; Ann Van Dyke; Nick Dillon
Round 5	Ken Smith	Richard Munchkin	Jane Gamble; Franky DeRocco; Skip Samad
Wild Card Round	"Hollywood" Dave Stann	Bobby J.	Michael Konik; Previn Mankodi; Richard Munchkin
Finals	"MIT Mike" Aponte	"Hollywood" Dave Stann	Jimmy Pine; Micky Rosa; Regina Guzior; Ken Smith

Mike Aponte, a former member of the MIT Blackjack Team, won the Season 1 championship and $100,000.

== Season 2 results ==
The World Series of Blackjack Tournament was held at Golden Nugget Hotel & Casino in Las Vegas. The first place will pick up $10,000 and move on to the Semi-Final table while the Second place will pick up $5,000 and move on to the Wild Card table. Third place will pick up $2,500 but will not advance in the tournament. Fourth place will pick up $1,000 and fifth place will pick up $500 and will be eliminated from the tournament. So only first and second The winner of the Wild Card table will move on to the Semi-Final table. The top two finishers in the Semi-Final table will move on to the final table for a chance at winning a $250,000 USD grand prize. First place at the final table will win a $250,000 USD grand prize.

Round	Winner	Runner-Up	Other Players
Round 1	Kevin Blackwood	"Hollywood" Dave Stann	Joe Pane; Rene Angelil; Katya Underhill
Round 2	Leann Moell	Charlene Ono	Ken Smith; Russ Hamilton; Marshall Sylver
Round 3	Stanford Wong	Robert Blechman	Regina Guzior; Richard Taraska; Nicki Vermeulen
Round 4	Kami Lis	Nancy Kubasek	Rick Blaine; Michael Konik; Henry Tamburin
Wild Card Round 1	Charlene Ono		"Hollywood" Dave Stann; Nancy Kubasek; Robert Blechman
Round 6	Anthony Curtis	Erica Schoenberg	Tyrone Washington; Rick Swogger; David Page
Round 7	Rick Jensen	Ken Einiger	Angie "Moneytaker" Hardy; Jimmy Pine; Jean Scott
Round 8	Viktor Nacht	Micky Rosa	Chuck Gorson; Joe Maloof; Lorna Fox
Round 9	Jason Geraci	Michelle Richards	"MIT" Mike Aponte; Eric Kiel; Brian Zembic
Wild Card Round 2	Ken Einiger		Micky Rosa; Erica Schoenberg; Michelle Richards
Semi-Final	Rick Jensen	Ken Einiger	Anthony Curtis; Viktor Nacht
Semi-Final	Stanford Wong	Kami Lis	Kevin Blackwood; Leann Moell
Finals	Ken Einiger	Kami Lis	Stanford Wong; Rick Jensen

Ken Einiger claimed the Season 2 championship, winning $250,000.

== Season 3 results ==
The World Series of Blackjack Tournament was held at Hilton Hotel & Casino in Las Vegas. The first place will move on to the Semi-Final table while the Second place will move on to the Wild Card table. The winner of the Wild Card table will move on to the Semi-Final table. The top two finishers in the Semi-Final table will move on to the Final Table for a chance at winning a $500,000 USD grand prize. First place at the final table will win a $500,000 USD grand prize.

Round	Winner	Runner-Up	Other Players
Round 1	Paul Haas	Tommy Dyer	John Grannis; Sheila Taylor; Ken Einiger
Round 2	Charlie Montoya	Kami Lis	Anthony Lu; Steve Bortle; Darrell Arnold
Round 3	Jeff Bernstein	Angie "Moneytaker" Hardy	Jamie Root; David Weston; Mano Fuentes
Round 4	Henry Tran	Randy Driggers	Jennifer Ortega; Ted Coustenis; Tommy Connor
Round 5	Tony Duong	John Payne	Shawn Crowder; Vicki Reed; "Hollywood" Dave Stann
Round 6	Dominick Haven	Ken Smith	Paul Eckstein; Val Hunter; Elie Karam
Round 7	Pat Nicholas	Henry Fletcher	Mikki Padilla; Frank Calderone; David Matthews
Round 8	"Razor" Rob Boisvert	Erica Schoenberg	Marshall E. Lafferty; Scottie Black; Randy Joyce
Wild Card Round 1	Kami Lis		Randy Driggers; Ken Smith; Tommy Dyer; Tommy Connor^{1}
Wild Card Round 2	John Payne		Jamie Root^{1}; Erica Schoenberg; Angie Hardy; Henry Fletcher
Semi-Final 1	Jeff Bernstein	John Payne	Henry Tran; Paul Haas; Pat Nicholas
Semi-Final 2	Kami Lis	Charlie Montoya	Tony Duong; Dominick Haven; Rob Boisvert
Finals	Jeff Bernstein	Tony Duong^{2}	John Payne; Kami Lis; Charlie Montoya

Dr. Jeff Bernstein claimed the Season 3 championship, winning the $500,000 grand prize.

^{1}Qualified for Wild Card Round through random drawing among all 3rd-5th place preliminary finishers.
^{2}Qualified for Final Table through random drawing among all 3rd-5th place semi-final finishers.

== Season 4 results ==
The World Series of Blackjack Tournament was held at Hilton Hotel & Casino in Las Vegas. The first place will move on to the Semi-Final table while the Second place will move on to the Wild Card table. The winner of the Wild Card table will move on to the Semi-Final table. The top two finishers in the Semi-Final table will move on to the final table for a chance at winning a $500,000 USD grand prize. First place at the final table will win a $500,000 USD grand prize.

Round	Winner	Runner-Up	Other Players
Round 1	George Mandilaras	Phil Dunaway	Tiffany Michelle; Christiane Hogenbirk; Jeff Bernstein
Round 2	Jeff Swenson	Kami Lis	Lon Johnson; Juan Cloud; Joe Malc
Round 3	Alice Walker	Norm Sheridan	Joe Fisher; Kacie Bergeron; "Hollywood" Dave Stann
Round 4	Salomon Cohen-Botbol	Rick Jensen	Orel Hershiser; Philip Richman; Mikki Sullivan
Round 5	Jarek Markowiak	Darrell Arnold	Caroline Rhea; Hans Schmid; Eli Haber
Round 6	T. J. Boros	Marlin Horseman	Penn Jillette; Ken Smith; Helen Ho
Round 7	Kristine Johnson	Rick Fortin	Ken Einiger; Don Rebentisch; Joe Reitman
Round 8	Marvin Ornstein	Dannye Long	Henry Tran; Angelo Merkouris; Shannon Elizabeth
Wild Card Round 1	Rick Fortin		Darrell Arnold; Henry Tran^{1}; Dannye Long; Kami Lis
Wild Card Round 2	Marlin Horseman		Christianne Hogenbirk^{1}; Rick Jensen; Norm Sheridan; Phil Dunaway
Semi-Final 1	Rick Fortin	Kristine Johnson	Marvin Ornstein; T. J. Boros; Salomon Cohen-Botbol
Semi-Final 2	Alice Walker	Marlin Horseman	Jarek Markowiak; George Mandilaras; Jeff Swenson
Finals	Alice Walker	Marlin Horseman	Rick Fortin; Kristine Johnson; T. J. Boros^{2}

Alice Walker (who had previously won GSN's million-dollar Three card poker championship) took first place and $500,000.
^{1}Qualified for Wild Card Round through random drawing among all 3rd-5th place preliminary finishers.
^{2}Qualified for final table through random drawing among all 3rd-5th places semi-final finishers

== See also ==
- Celebrity Blackjack
- World Blackjack Tour
- Ultimate Blackjack Tour
