= Face the Ace =

- Genre: Reality television series
- Presented by: Steve Schirripa
- Country of origin: United States
- Original language: English
- No. of seasons: 1
- No. of episodes: 7

Production
- Running time: 60 minutes (with commercials)
- Production company: POKER PROductions

Original release
- Network: NBC
- Release: August 1, 2009 – January 2, 2010

Face the Ace was a poker-themed game show on NBC, first airing August 1, 2009. The show was hosted by Steve Schirripa (The Sopranos) along with hostess/spokesmodel Megan Abrigo (Deal or No Deal) and featured the commentary of Ali Nejad, who also served in the same capacity for NBC's Poker After Dark. The show's primary sponsor was Full Tilt Poker, which supplied the contestants and the professional poker players ("aces") against whom they competed.

== Format ==
Contestants are poker players 21 or older who won a free qualifying tournament on Full Tilt Poker and were flown to Las Vegas for filming at Cin City Studios.

In the show, the contestant chooses one of four doors, each with a poker professional behind it. Potential opponents include Phil Ivey, Howard Lederer, Chris Ferguson, Erick Lindgren, Erik Seidel, Allen Cunningham, John Juanda, Jennifer Harman, Phil Gordon, Andy Bloch, Mike Matusow, Gus Hansen, Huck Seed, Gavin Smith and Patrik Antonius. The contestant then "faces the ace" in a heads up (one-on-one) Texas hold 'em poker match. If the contestant defeats the pro, he can choose to either take US$40,000 and leave, or risk it all and play another pro for $200,000 in a second round. In the third and final round, the prize increases to $1,000,000.

== Reception ==
Face the Ace was the least-viewed program among the four major networks (Fox, CBS, ABC, and NBC) in the 9–10 p.m. (ET/PT) timeslot when it premiered August 1, 2009. The episode had 1.59 million viewers in its first 30 minutes on the air, but this number dropped to 1.54 million in the next 30 minutes, making it the only show in its timeslot to see a drop in viewership in its second half of airing. The show competed against America's Most Wanted on Fox, the movie Red Eye on ABC, and Numb3rs on CBS.

Several of NBC's largest affiliates, including Post-Newsweek's KPRC-TV in Houston and WDIV-TV in Detroit, along with Milwaukee's WTMJ-TV and several smaller affiliates preempted the two prime time episodes with either local programming, a sponsored program from St. Jude Children's Research Hospital, or infomercials, likely due to concerns about gambling-related television in prime time or their anticipation of subpar ratings. The Post-Newsweek stations declined to air all of NBC's poker-related programming, including Poker After Dark, due to corporate policies.
