= Clamor =

Clamor may refer to:

- Clamor (magazine), a bi-monthly magazine published in Toledo, Ohio
- Charmaine Clamor, Filipino singer
- Clamor Heinrich Abel (1634–1696), German composer
- Clamor Wilhelm Schürmann (1815–1893), Lutheran missionary to Australia
