= Brian Zembic =

Canadian gambler

- Born: 1961 (age 64–65); Winnipeg, Manitoba, Canada
- Other name: The Wiz
- Occupations: High-stakes gambler Magician
- Known for: Professional gambler
- Children: Mika (born 2000; age 25–26)

Brian Zembic, nicknamed the Wiz (born 1961), is a Canadian magician and high-stakes gambler specializing in blackjack and backgammon. In the late 1990s, he became famed as "a man who would do anything to win a bet". A famous wager was in 1996 when he agreed to receive breast implants and keep them for one year in return for US$100,000 (US$210,000 in 2025). The year passed and he won the bet but he became accustomed to the breasts and did not choose to have them removed.

== Biography ==
=== Early life ===
Zembic was born 1961 in Winnipeg, Manitoba, Canada.

=== The bet ===
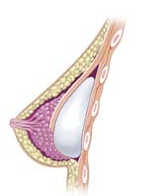
Subpectoral breast implant

In the summer of 1996, Zembic was gambling in a high-stakes game when the conversation turned to breast implants. One of his friends, another gambler named Jobo, had the opinion that having implants in order to attract men was a crazy thing to do. Zembic disagreed and said that it was not a serious event and that the consequences were small. An argument ensued and the two agreed that they would enter into a wager where Zembic would receive breast implants and if he kept them in for a year he would win US$100,000 (US$210,000 in 2025).

The two established a contract to work out the details. Zembic would pay for the operation to have 38C implants placed under his pec muscles. Jobo placed the money with a third party to guarantee payment if Zembic won the bet. For a few months in 1996, he didn't follow through with the wager, but in the fall of 1996 Zembic lost a large amount of money playing the stock market and sought out a surgeon to go through with the procedure in order to win the $100,000 prize to cover his losses.

Through his gambling contacts, he found a cosmetic surgeon (who was also a gambler). After a few games of backgammon, Zembic was able to get the $4,500 surgery in exchange for forgiving the doctor's debt. In October 1996, Zembic underwent the breast augmentation surgery in New York City. Jobo, upon hearing that Zembic had undergone surgery, offered to buy out the bet by paying $50,000 to cancel the wager but Zembic refused and said he would see the wager through for the full year and full $100,000. In October 1997, he fulfilled the arrangements of the bet and Jobo deposited the full $100,000 into a Swiss bank account.

After the one-year mark passed, he became a celebrity of sorts because of the wager. In 1999, his tale was the title feature in a book of short stories called The man with the $100,000 breasts and other gambling stories. Decades later, he still has the implants inside his chest, saying "They'll fall apart, sooner or later, or they might last. At my age, I don't care".

=== Other wagers ===
Although Zembic is a notorious gambler, he claims the "breast bet" remains the most stupid he has ever accepted. He has taken part in other wagers, including one for $14,000 when he lived in a bathroom for a week before the people he took the bet with bought him out for $7,000. He once played famous poker player Doyle Brunson in a ping pong game where Zembic took $14,000. On another bet he slept the night in New York's Central Park with $20,000 on his person. He also lived in a box for a week to earn another $25,000.

=== Other work ===
On March 25, 2005, Zembic played in the Season 2 of World Series of Blackjack, where he lost to Jason Geraci, Michelle Richards, Mike Aponte, and Eric Kiel (winner of a million-dollar tournament) in round 9. Zembic is also a professional magician.

== Public appearances ==
The Man Show

He was seen by millions as the guy with the band-aids on his nipples on The Man Show. For this feat, the hosts paid Brian $100. On that show, he also recounted his experience living in a bathroom for a month in exchange for $15,000.

Ripley's Believe It or Not!

Zembic appeared on Ripley's Believe It or Not! in 2001.

Botched

Zembic appeared on Botched on Season 3, Episode 2, "Man Boobs". It aired 2016-05-17, and described his personal history involving his breast implants and consulting with doctors on the health concerns involving retaining or removing them.

== In popular media ==
=== Book ===
- Konik, Michael (28 December 1999). The man with the $100,000 breasts and other gambling stories (1999 ed.). Broadway Books. ISBN 978-0-7679-0445-2.- Total pages: 234

=== Untitled movie ===
In a 2005 interview, Zembic stated that starting in 1999, there was a movie in the works about his story. Fox Searchlight Pictures bought the rights to his story. The script has been completed and various stars have been attached like Drew Carey and David Duchovny. Zembic says part of the reason he hasn't had the implants removed is that "... every year when they renewed the rights, they kept saying, 'Keep the tits so you can appear at the end of the movie. It'll be really cool.'" But David Higgins the producer attached to the film says, "I'm not insisting that he keep his implants in; it's completely up to him," he says. "It would be great for marketing, of course, but we can always find another way."

== Family ==
In 2000, Zembic fathered a daughter, Mika, with his then-wife. When asked about her father's breasts, Mika said, "I know why [Zembic has] boobs: Uncle Mike paid [Zembic] money to put them in". In a 2006 interview, he said that Mika was one of the few reasons he would have the implants taken out; if they caused her to be bullied in school, he would have them removed.
