= Jani Sointula =

Finnish poker player

- Nickname: Hellraiser
- Born: c. 1975 (age 50–51)

World Series of Poker
- Bracelet: None
- Money finishes: 4
- Highest WSOP Main Event finish: 198th, 2005

World Poker Tour
- Title: None
- Final table: 1
- Money finish: 1

European Poker Tour
- Title: None
- Final table: None
- Money finishes: 2

Jani Sointula (born c. 1975) is a Finnish professional poker player from Helsinki.

In November 2004, he won the Monte Carlo Millions, defeating fellow countryman Juha Helppi in the final heads-up confrontation to take home the $400,000 first prize. The final table also featured fellow professional Phil Ivey, who finished 3rd and went on to win the event the following year.

In March 2005, Sointula finished on the final table bubble of the first European Poker Tour (EPT) Grand Final. He also finished in the money of the 2005 World Series of Poker $10,000 no limit hold'em main event.

In June 2006, Sointula made his first World Poker Tour (WPT) final table at the fifth season Grand Prix de Paris event, finishing runner-up when his A♥ 5♦ lost to Christian Grundtvig's 6♥ 6♦.

As of 2008, his total live tournament winnings exceed $1,000,000.

Sointula's online poker handle is 'Hellraiser'.
