= Igor Ivitskiy =

Ukrainian PhD mathematician

- Born: August 15, 1989 (age 36)
- Other names: Ігор Івіцький, Игорь Ивицкий
- Education: PhD in Engineering, Kyiv Polytechnic Institute; University of Cambridge (Institute of Continuing Education)
- Occupations: Mathematician, entrepreneur
- Known for: Mathematical Modeling
- Awards: President of Ukraine Award for Young Scientists, Young Scientist of the Year
- Website: https://ivitskiy.com

Igor Ivitskiy (Note: Various spellings of the surname (Ivitskiy, Ivitskyi, Ivitsky) result from Ukrainian-English transliteration differences.) is a Ukrainian mathematician and technology entrepreneur based in the United Kingdom, known for applying mathematical modelling to digital advertising.

He holds a PhD in mathematical modelling, has authored over 200 scientific publications, patents, and monographs, and was awarded the President of Ukraine's Prize for Young Scientists.

His advertising work received the award at Adworld Experience, Europe's largest PPC conference, in 2024, and in 2026 he placed sixth in the Top 50 Most Influential PPC Experts industry ranking.

== Early life and education ==
Born in Odesa to a military family, Ivitskiy moved to Kyiv with his family in 1994.

In 2012, he graduated from the Kyiv Polytechnic Institute with a master's degree. At the same time, he received a second degree at the National Aviation University, specializing in Computer Systems and Networks. In 2011, Igor Ivitskiy captained the KPI engineering team that won first place at the national stage of the European BEST Engineering Competition and subsequently ranked among the top five teams in the final round in Istanbul, Turkey.

After relocating to the United Kingdom, Ivitskiy completed programmes at the University of Cambridge's Institute of Continuing Education, studying topics including artificial intelligence, entrepreneurship, and business strategy. He subsequently founded a company in the United Kingdom and was recognised by the UK government as an Exceptional Global Talent.

== Academic and scientific career ==
He continued to explore the mathematical modeling of non-Newtonian fluids and polymer composites, culminating in over 200 scholarly works and more than 50 patents.

His work has been cited over 300 times, with an h-index of 12.

Ivitskiy has served as General Chair, keynote Speaker, and committee Member at numerous international conferences, including International Conference on Cloud Computer, IoT and Intelligence System, ICAMMCE, ISCMRE, Science and Engineering Research Center and others.

In 2018, he was elected to the council of the International Alliance of the Silk Road Universities Association.

== Digital advertising career ==
Ivitskiy transitioned from academic research into digital advertising, where he applies mathematical modelling and computational methods to Google Ads optimization and marketing analytics. He is a frequent speaker at international industry conferences, including Hero Conf (Brighton), Adworld Experience (Bologna), and the International Search Summit (Barcelona). In the United States, he presented at the Definitive Traffic Seminar (2023) and the Definitive AI Seminar (2024) in Chicago organised by Perry Marshall. He is also among the announced speakers for SMX Advanced Europe in Berlin.

He is regularly featured in the "Top 100 Most Influential PPC Experts" by TrueClicks, notably ranking sixth on the 2026 Top 50 list based on peer voting and quantitative performance metrics. Additionally, Ivitskiy is an active angel investor, recognized by StartupMag UK as one of the top 100 investors in North West England.

== Awards and honors ==
- Young Teacher-Researcher (2015–2018)
- Cabinet of Ministers Scholarship for Young Scientists (2016)
- President of Ukraine’s Prize for Young Scientists (2018)
- Kyiv Mayor’s Prize for Outstanding Youth Achievements – Honored for his contributions to the development of Kyiv. (2019)
- Young Scientist of the Year (2020)
- 1st Place PPC Award at Europe’s largest all-PPC event for innovative advertising strategies (2024)
- Sixth place, Top 50 Most Influential PPC Experts (2026)
