= Michael Konik =

American author and poker player

- Education: New York University
- Occupations: Author; Television personality; Singer; Comedian; Blackjack player; Poker player
- Spouse: Charmaine Clamor
- Website: Official website

Michael Konik is an American author, television personality, jazz singer, improvisational comedian, blackjack player and poker player. Konik has a degree in Drama from New York University.

Konik currently resides in Hollywood, California with his wife Charmaine Clamor, and his dog Billie.

== Writing ==
Michael Konik is the author of the following books:

- The Man with the $100,000 Breasts and other Gambling Stories (1999)
- Nice Shot, Mr. Nicklaus: Stories About the Game of Golf (2000) Huntington Press, ISBN 0-929712-03-X
- Telling Lies and Getting Paid (2002) Huntington Press, ISBN 0-929712-73-0
- In Search of Burningbush: A Story of Golf, Friendship, and the Meaning of Irons (2004) McGraw-Hill, ISBN 0-07-144269-3
- Ella in Europe: An American Dog’s International Adventure (2005) Random House Publishing Group, ISBN 0-385-33863-5
- The Smart Money: How the World's Best Sports Bettors Beat the Bookies Out of Millions (2006) Simon & Schuster, ISBN 978-0-7432-7714-3
- Reefer Gladness (2010) Huntington Press, ISBN 1-935396-24-2
- Becoming Bobby (2012) Huntington Press ISBN 1-935396-61-7
- Making It (2014)
- The Termite Squad (2016) Eggypress 0-995952-72-8
- How the Revolution Started (2017) Eggypress 0-995952-71-0
- Year 14 (2017) Barrelhouse Books ISBN 978-0988994553
- The Unexpected Guest: How a Homeless Man from the Streets of Los Angeles Transformed Our Homef58 (2020) Diversion Books 9781635767292

Konik was also the gambling columnist for Cigar Aficionado for five years, the golf columnist for Delta SKY for 10 years, and has been published in more than 100 other magazines, including Travel and Leisure, Maxim, and Sports Illustrated.

== Television ==
Michael Konik was a contestant on NBC's 2007 Poker After Dark, a $20,000 buy-in competition in which he finished 5th. He also competed in two of the televised World Series of Blackjack programs, advancing to the semi-finals. He has also either hosted or provided commentary for the following shows:

- Poker Superstars
- Poker Dome Challenge
- Aussie Millions
- Championship at the Plaza
- American Poker Championship at Turning Stone
- Full Tilt Pro Poker Showdown
- Monte Carlo Millions
- Asia-Pacific Speed Poker Championship
- Poker Championship at Red Rock

Konik was a contestant on Jeopardy!, where he finished 2nd, the USA Network game show Quicksilver, where he set the one-day all-time record, and was a "phone-a-friend" lifeline on Who Wants to Be a Millionaire. Konik was also a contestant two episodes of Greed. He competed in the December 9, 1999 episode, winning $5,000 as the Captain. On February 29, 2000, he was on another episode, but failed to win any money.

In 2006, Konik played himself in the Animal Planet comedy Ella & Me, based on his book Ella in Europe. His dog Ella, a lab-greyhound mix, co-starred.

== Music ==
Konik was a singer and bass player for the 1980s punk rock band The Clitboys. He has recorded the jazz albums Crescendo and There'll Be Some Changes Made, both released in 2003: Konik and his "Tasty Band" host the longest-running weekly jazz event in Hollywood, the "Tasty Tuesday Night Jazz Party," at Catalina Bar & Grill Jazz Club. Konik owns a recording company called FreeHam Records, which includes Linda Hopkins and the Filipina jazz star Charmaine Clamor.

== Comedy ==
Konik was a member of the improvisational comedy troupe The Los Hombres and MINT (Musical Improv Network Television), which performed at Second City Los Angeles. Konik's most popular recurring character was a bread salesman who repeated the word "papadum" over and over throughout an entire scene.

== Blackjack and poker ==
Konik has participated in the World Series of Blackjack, the Legends of Poker Tour, the World Series of Poker and Poker After Dark.
