= Primm Valley Golf Club =

Golf course in Primm, Nevada

- Interactive map of Primm Valley Golf Club
- 35°33′19″N 115°25′25″W

Club information
- Location: 1 Yates Well Road; Nipton, California, U.S. 92364
- Established: 1997; 29 years ago
- Type: Public
- Tota holes: 36
- Tournaments: Southern Nevada (SNGA) Senior Championship; Medalist (MGAN) Nevada Series - Primm Valley Lakes
- Website: www.primmvalleygolf.com

Lakes Course
- Designed by: Tom Fazio
- Par: 71
- Length: 7131
- Course rating: 74.2

Desert Course
- Designed by: Tom Fazio
- Par: 72
- Length: 6945
- Course rating: 73.3

Primm Valley Golf Club was a part of Primm Valley Resort and was located south of Primm, Nevada in Nipton, California.

The Golf Club included the Lakes Course and the Desert Course.

== History ==
In 2007, the club was host to the inaugural World Series of Golf tournament.

On July 19, 2024, the golf club was permanently closed.

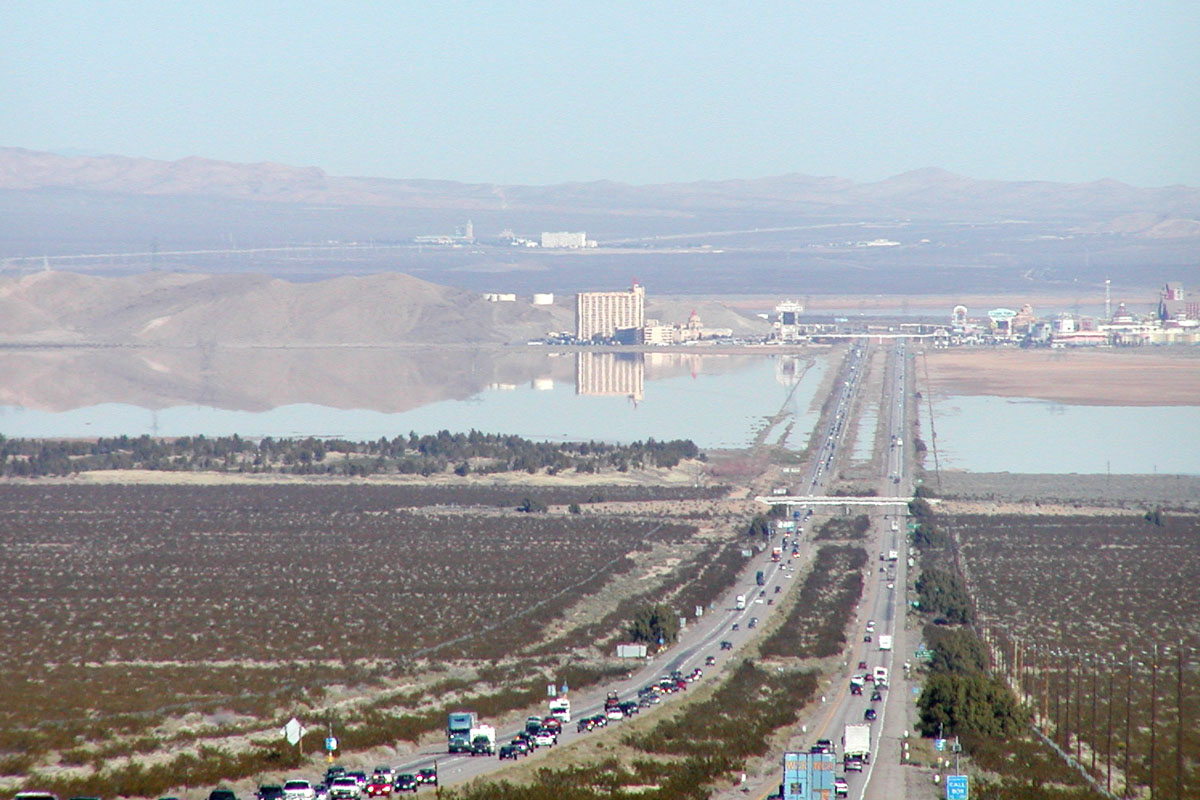
Ivanpah Lake with the Golf Club in the left center of the picture in 2005
