= Henry Tamburin =

American gambler

Henry Tamburin (born 1944) is an author on the subject of gambling, holding a background in mathematics and a doctorate in chemistry. He is best known for his books Ultimate Blackjack Strategy Guide and Blackjack: Take the Money and Run which explains basic blackjack strategy, managing a bankroll, side bets and advanced tactics like card counting.

Tamburin is known for his prowess as a blackjack player and teaches courses in blackjack across the United States. He has published 700 articles on various casino games from craps to video poker in publications like The Gambler Magazine, Gaming South Magazine, Strictly Slots and Casino Player Magazine. He had been working as a manager of chemical company (an international one) for 30 years and always loved his work; after being retired he began to devote more time to the game of blackjack and became interested in video poker too.

Tamburin also appeared in a televised blackjack tournament entitled the Ultimate Blackjack Tour, which aired on CBS. He was editor and publisher of the Blackjack Insider Newsletter (until retirement in December 2017), and he ran a website called Smart Gaming.
