= Full Tilt Poker Championship at Red Rock =

Full Tilt Poker Championship at Red Rock (also FullTiltPoker.Net Championship at Red Rock) was a seven-week televised shootout poker tournament played at the Red Rock Resort Spa and Casino in Summerlin near Las Vegas, Nevada. The tournament was sponsored by online poker website Full Tilt Poker and aired by Fox Sports Net. In each of the first six episodes, six professional poker player affiliated with Full Tilt Poker played a single-table freezeout tournament. The winner of each freezeout won US$25,000 and advanced to the seven-handed final table. The seventh seat at the final table was filled by Stefan Rehn, an Internet qualifier. Tournaments featured a speed poker format, with players having 30 seconds to act on their hands with one 60-second time extension per match.

The final table was broadcast live on November 23, 2006. Barry Tompkins, Michael Konik and Howard Lederer provided commentary. Matt Savage served as tournament director.

== Final table ==
Position	Player	Winnings
1	Phil Gordon	$600,000
2	Roland De Wolfe	$275,000
3	Toto Leonidas	$25,000
4	Stefan Rehn (internet qualifier)	$25,000
5	John Juanda	$25,000
6	Erick Lindgren	$25,000
7	Allen Cunningham	$25,000
