= Perry Marshall =

American marketing consultant

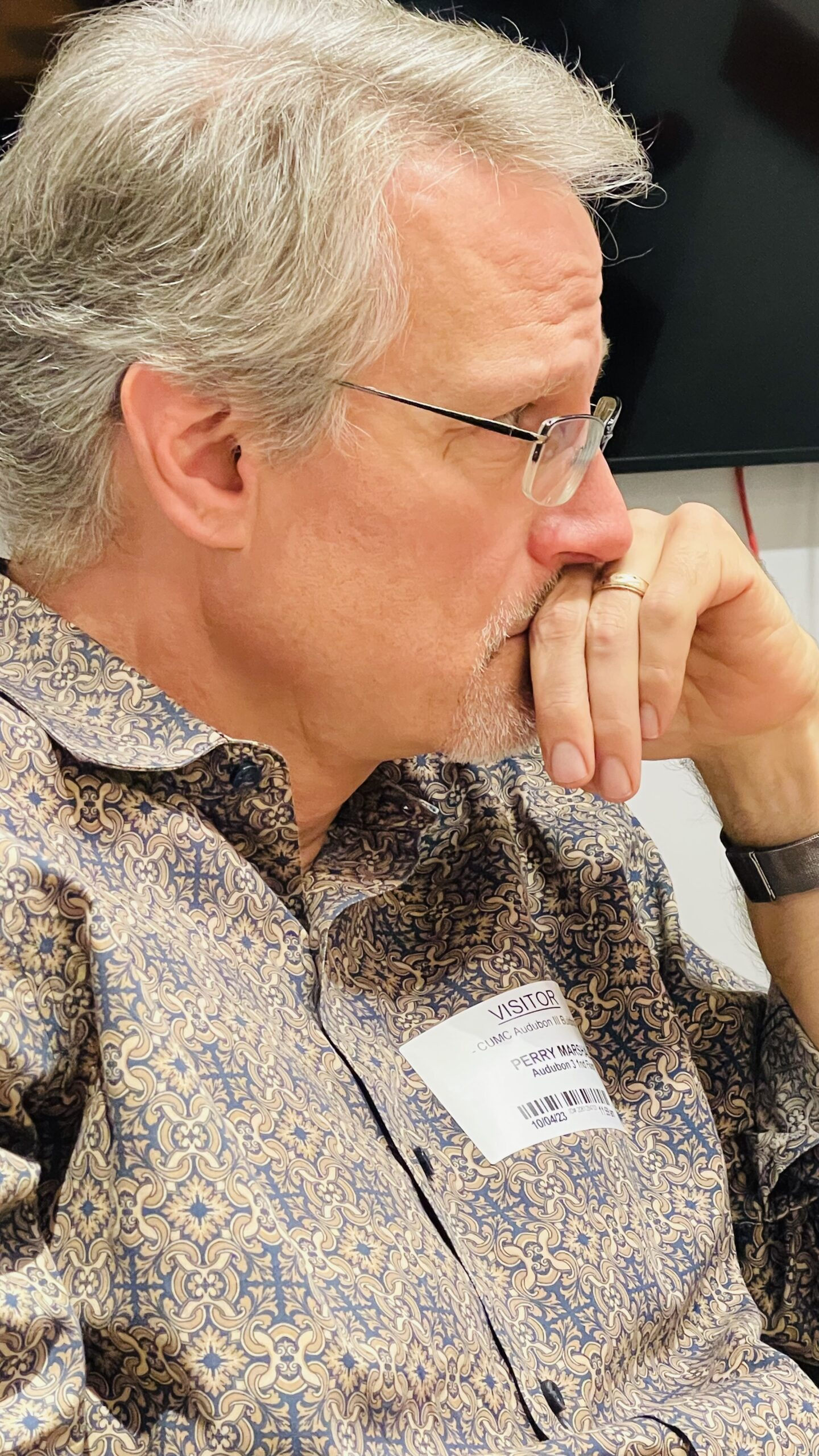
- Marshall c. 2025
- Education: University of Nebraska–Lincoln
- Occupations: Business consultant, author
- Website: perrymarshall.com

Perry Sink Marshall is an American business consultant and author.

== Life ==
Marshall is the son of a pastor. He graduated with a degree in electrical engineering from the University of Nebraska–Lincoln in December 1992.

== Career ==
Marshall published his first book, Industrial Ethernet: A Pocket Guide. in the 2000s. The second and third editions of the book are co-written with John Rinaldi.

In 2015, he published Evolution 2.0: Breaking the Deadlock Between Darwin And Design (BenBella Books, Inc., ISBN 978-1-940363-80-6), a publicly accessible account of scientific progress supporting extended evolutionary synthesis.

The book accepts the process of natural selection, but based on the work of Barbara McClintock, Lynn Margulis, James A. Shapiro and Denis Noble, rejects the hypothesis that variation arises primarily from random DNA copying errors. It summarises the argument of Hubert Yockey that DNA transcription and translation are encoding and decoding as defined in information theory expounded by Claude Shannon and not derivable from currently known laws of physics. He provides an overview of the following mechanisms, which he regards as more likely sources of variation:

- Epigenetics – heritable phenotype changes that do not involve alterations in the DNA sequence
- Transposition – the rearrangement of DNA segments to different locations in the gene
- Horizontal gene transfer – the transfer of genetic material between organisms
- Hybridization – the outcome of sexual reproduction between two distinct species
- Symbiogenesis – the theory that some organelles of eukaryotic cells are descended from formerly free-living prokaryotes

=== Evolution 2.0 Technology Prize ===
Marshall has organized a private equity group and created the Evolution 2.0 prize, which is presently a $10 million reward for an Origin Of Information experiment that can be specified as a patentable process. He announced the prize at the Royal Society in May 2019.

The Evolution 2.0 prize is offered to anyone who can demonstrate a spontaneously arising communication system that matches Claude Shannon's 1948 definition. Marshall says that if claims that codes are an emergent property of nature are true, then the problem should be in principle solvable and commercially valuable. He suggests that such a discovery would produce breakthrough results in artificial intelligence research.

Submissions will be evaluated by a judging panel consisting of:

- George Church, Harvard & MIT
- Denis Noble, Oxford University

=== Cancer Symposium and Working Group ===
Marshall was a co-organizer – alongside Frank H. Laukien, James A. Shapiro, Denis Noble and Henry Heng – of the three-day Cancer and Evolution Symposium in October 2020, serving as facilitator on the third day. The proceedings led to a 2021 special issue of Progress in Biophysics and Molecular Biology dedicated to cancer evolution, which included Marshall's paper "Biology transcends the limits of computation." The symposium also led to the creation of the Cancer Evolution Working Group within the American Association for Cancer Research (AACR)), and to the monthly online Cancer Evolution Seminar Series.

Marshall is a faculty member at the 1st International Conference on Polyploid Giant Cancer Cells at the University of Texas MD Anderson Cancer Center, February 2024, an event documented in a 2025 meeting report in Cancer Letters.
