= Gemaco =

Manufacturing company

- Headquarters: Blue Springs, Missouri
- Products: Playing cards, chips, table layouts for casinos
- Parent: Angel Playing Cards

Gemaco is a manufacturer of playing cards, casino chips and table layouts for casinos. The company is based in Blue Springs, Missouri.

== History ==
In 2012, poker player Phil Ivey won $9.6 million playing baccarat at the Borgata casino in Atlantic City, New Jersey. Borgata alleged that Ivey cheated using a scheme known as edge sorting. Claiming manufacturing defects, Borgata filed a lawsuit against Gemaco to cover the losses. In 2012, Golden Nugget Atlantic City filed a lawsuit against Gemaco after a shipment of unshuffled decks led to 14 players winning a combined total of $1.5 million in Mini-Baccarat at the casino. In 2014, it was acquired by Gaming Partners International, which has since been purchased by Angel Playing Cards of Kyoto, Japan. In 2018, the ruling judge has cleared the company of accountability and put the emphasis on the players instead. Many casinos use cards with a border to stop people from being able to do this.
