= Ivey League =

Poker training website

Ivey League was a poker training website founded by American professional poker player Phil Ivey. Ivey League launched on January 28, 2014, offering poker strategy videos from prominent professional players serving as coaches. The roster of Ivey League instructors included Ivey, Jennifer Harman, Cole South and Patrik Antonius, among others. There are three membership tiers available for varying skill levels. Training videos covered Texas hold'em in addition to many other poker variants and topics.

== History ==
LeggoPoker.com officially launched on November 17, 2007. Users received access to online forums, videos from pros, individual and group coaching, and information on poker rakeback. The site employed a roster of well-known and successful online pros to act as coaches, including Aaron "aejones" Jones, Peter "Apathy" Jetten and Andrew "luckychewy" Lichtenberger. Co-owners Greg Brooks and Chris Tickner took a hands-on approach to operating Leggo Poker. Greg Brooks served as a coach on the site, while Chris Tickner led the technical product. In October 2009, lead video producer Aaron Jones purchased the site from Greg Brooks and Chris Tickner.

== Acquisition ==
In February 2013, Phil Ivey announced the acquisition of Leggo Poker with the intention of converting the training site into Ivey League. Leggo Poker's team of instructors, including former owner and lead video producer Aaron Jones, transitioned to the new website.

In April 2017, Ivey league announced it would no longer post new video content.
