= Monica Reeves =

Canadian poker player (born 1972)

- Born: 1972 (age 53–54); Oakville, Ontario, Canada

World Poker Tour
- Money finish: 1

Monica Reeves (born 1972 in Oakville, Ontario) is a Canadian professional poker and blackjack player.

She is a former model who began her gambling career in 2005 under the tutelage of expert poker player Jim Worth. After nine months, Reeves was able to start playing professionally. She placed 8th in the St. Maarten Spring Poker Showdown, 114th in the Aruba Poker Classic and chopped first in the Bellagio $1,000 event in the summer of 2006.

Reeves won the fourth preliminary tournament in the Ultimate Blackjack Tour, a televised 10-week blackjack tournament airing on CBS, and she also finished second in the ladies event. Reeves is one of the endorsed pros on the Ultimate Blackjack Tour.

As of 2008, her total live tournament winnings exceed $40,000.
