= Elimination Blackjack =

Tournament format of blackjack

Elimination Blackjack is a tournament format of blackjack invented by Russ Hamilton, that was played on the Ultimate Blackjack Tour and in various casinos. It combines the game of blackjack with elements of No Limit Texas Hold'Em. Unlike Texas Hold'Em tournaments, players are still competing against the same dealer that is why the results of most players at the table are likely to be the same. UltimateBet, a sponsor of the Ultimate Blackjack Tour, offered online elimination blackjack tournaments prior to bankruptcy.

== Rules ==
A round of elimination blackjack in most cases is thirty hands in length. Depending upon the organization hosting the event, a player will start with between $10,000 and $100,000 in chips. While certain organizations have their own house rules, elimination blackjack usually follows the following rules:

- The house must hit on soft 17 and anything below, and must stay on hard 17 and anything above.
- A player may split pairs up to four times with the exception of aces. Some rule sets also allow splitting different cards valued at 10, such as a queen and a jack.
- A shoe of six decks is used.
- A player's bet must stay within the minimum and maximum bet allowed at the table (this rule is excluded in the World Series of Blackjack). The maximum bet is usually at least several times bigger than the starting chip stack.
- A player may surrender their hand and thus recover one half of their original bet.
- A player may buy insurance if the up card for the house is an ace.
- A player can only double down with two cards.
- A maximum of seven players is allowed per table.
- A player has twenty five seconds in a normal hand to make a decision. In an elimination hand a player has forty five seconds.

Some organizations allow a secret bet where the players at the table do not know the value of that player's bet, until after that player's hand is concluded. In most games, this option can be used only once during a single round of the tournament.

=== Eliminations ===
Depending on the organization hosting the event, a player is eliminated from the tournament in three ways:

- Losing all of his chips.
- Not having enough chips to meet the minimum required bet.
- Being the player with the fewest chips after a certain number of hands are played. In this case, the usual cutoff points are hands #8, #16, and #25 (so-called "elimination hands"). A player is always eliminated from the game in an elimination hand, even if a player has been eliminated in the previous hand.

=== Winning ===
Usually the last player left at the table is the winner, or the player with the most chips after 30 hands have been played. Blackjack is sometimes played in a multi-table tournament format where one or more players advance to the next round after the others have been eliminated. If there are too many players left after 30 hands, the players who advance are determined by chip stacks.
