= Henry Heng =

American biologist, author

- Education: University of Toronto
- Known for: Studies in genomics, evolutionary biology, cancer evolution
- Awards: PROSE Awards finalist 2020 Wayne State Board of Governors’ award
- Scientific career
- Workplaces: Wayne State University School of Medicine

Henry HQ Heng is a professor of molecular medicine and genetics and of pathology at the Wayne State University School of Medicine. Heng first received his PhD from the University of Toronto Hospital for Sick Children in 1994, mentored by Lap-Chee Tsui. He then completed his post-doc under Peter Moens at York University, before joining the Wayne State University School of Medicine faculty.

Heng's lab is dedicated to researching a wide variety of topics ranging from genomics, evolution, and cancer, using their new framework: the Genome Architecture Theory (GAT). The Genome Architecture Theory focuses more on a genome or chromosome-oriented approach to biology, in contrast to the traditional gene-oriented approach. Major tenets of the framework include genome topology, the idea that there is an emergent level of information from the order of genes on a chromosome, two-phased evolution, a model of evolution proposing a punctuated and gradual phase in evolution using cancer evolution as a model, and genome chaos, an overarching phenomenon of genomic instability that results from stress and can rearrange the genome, characterized by non-clonal chromosomal aberrations (NCCAs).

In 2015, he wrote his first book, Debating Cancer: The Paradox in Cancer Research. His second book, Genome Chaos: Rethinking Genetics, Evolution, and Molecular Medicine, published in 2019, was a PROSE Awards finalist in 2020. For his book, he was presented the 2020 Wayne State Board of Governors’ award.

He formerly served as co-editor-in-chief of the journal Molecular Cytogenetics.

== Two-phased cancer evolution ==
Heng proposed a two-phased model of cancer evolution alternating between a punctuated macroevolutionary phase and a gradual microevolutionary phase. In the macroevolutionary phase, the stress-induced rapid genome reorganization creates new system information essential for system survival. In the microevolutionary phase, more minor gene-level adaptations promote population growth. Importantly, this model implies that the stepwise accumulation of microevolution over time does not equate to macroevolution. A two-phased evolutionary model can be extended to organismal evolution as well, as cancer offers an effective platform to study the mechanisms of evolution.

== Karyotype coding ==
To understand the creation and maintenance of system information for complexity and diversity in biology, Heng coined the term ‘karyotype code.’ This idea presents the karyotype as a code defined by genomic topology of all genes and other DNA sequences. Thus, the physical relationship of genes within a three-dimensional nucleus may change genetic expression without explicitly changing any genes. Karyotype coding differentiates ‘parts inheritance,’ or the inheritance of the gene level, from ‘system inheritance,’ which posits there are emergent properties in the genome that arise at a level above the gene. This framework highlights the importance of a genome organization-based information package and its implications for future genomic and evolutionary studies.

== Genome chaos ==
Genome chaos is another term proposed by Heng to describe the process of rapid genome re-organization during cellular crisis results in various chaotic genomes that display newly created system information. This phenomenon was occasionally observed in cytogenetic studies, and it was largely ignored until the establishment of a link between genome chaos and the punctuated phase of cancer evolution. It was recently confirmed by sequencing across different cancer types, and has been described by a wide array of new terminology (including “chromothripsis,” “chromoplexy,” “chromoanagenesis,” “chromoanasynthesis,” “chromosome catastrophes,” “structural mutations,” “Frankenstein chromosomes,” and more). Despite the various individual molecular mechanisms can trigger genome chaos, acting as a cellular survival mechanism, the common consequence is the formation of new genomes ready for macroevolutionary selection.

== Fuzzy inheritance ==
Fuzzy inheritance is another term coined by Heng describing the heterogeneity and unpredictable relationship between genotype and phenotype. Traditionally, various non-clonal abnormal structures were insignificant “noise” and the results of bio-errors. To explain the mechanism of various types of heterogeneity, from gene to genome, including nongenomic types, Heng has proposed that the inheritance itself is heterogenous, even for a single gene. While the gene theory, which states that a gene codes for a specific, fixed phenotype, and the environmental impact on the genotype’s penetration, fuzzy inheritance suggests that most genes code for a range of potential phenotypes depending on the context provided by other genes and the environment. From this “fuzzy” range of potential phenotypes, the respective environment can then allow the best-suited status to be “chosen”. Such inheritance that codes for a range of phenotypes, not just a fixed phenotype, is named a fuzzy inheritance. Fuzzy inheritance can be observed at the gene, epigenetic, and genome levels. Furthermore, genome instability can increase the ‘fuzziness’ of inheritance, which is useful for cellular adaptation.

== Function of sexual reproduction ==
When discussing the main function of sexual reproduction, a generally accepted viewpoint states that asexual reproduction produces identical copies and that the main function of sexual reproduction is to mix genes for the diversity necessary for evolutionary progression. By treating a species as a system, Heng suggests that mixing genes will not change a given system (species), rather that sexual reproduction promotes the continuation of a species by maintaining the chromosome-defined boundary or framework of a species. Heng proposes the main function of sexual reproduction as the preservation of the identity of a given genome rather than the promotion of genetic diversity as is commonly thought.

== Genome architecture theory ==
To solve ever-increasing surprises in genomic research that challenge the gene theory, Heng has established the genome architecture theory (GAT) with 12 key principles including the concept of how genome reorganization, rather than new gene formation defines new species. According to the GAT, genome-level re-organizations create new species or systems (representing macro-evolution), while the gene or epigenetic levels of alteration modify a species (representing the micro-evolution). Heng asserts that the genome or karyotype is not simply a carrier of DNA but instead an organizer of genes. More precisely, by changing the network of genes that influence phenotype, without specifically changing the genes themselves, genomic topology changes can use karyotype changes to change phenotype. The relationship between gene mutations, epigenetic changes, and genome changes can be illustrated by a multiple-level landscape model where the local landscape represents gene/epigenetic status and the global landscape represents the status of genome replacement. Fundamentally, different bioprocesses require different types of inheritance, which should be studied in different landscapes.

== High-resolution Fiber-FISH ==
Heng pioneered high-resolution FISH on released chromatin fibers that have revolutionized the FISH field. This system, now known as Fiber-FISH, has been extensively used for gene cloning, physical mapping, DNA replication, copy number variation (CNV), and genome structure studies.

== Books ==
- Heng, Henry (2019). Genome Chaos: Rethinking Genetics, Evolution, and Molecular Medicine. Academic Press. ISBN 9780128136355.
- Heng, Henry (2015). Debating Cancer: The Paradox in Cancer Research. World Scientific. ISBN 9789814520843.
