= Monte Carlo Millions =

First poker tournament held in Monaco

Tournament information
- Sport: Poker
- Location: Monaco
- Month played: November
- Established: 2004
- Teams: 80 (2004); 120 (2005)

The Monte Carlo Millions was the first ever poker tournament to be staged in the city-state of Monaco. The inaugural event was completed on 12 November 2004. Apparently birthed out of the preceding explosion of Texas Hold 'em popularity, it was conceived of and sponsored by Prima Poker. The field was limited to 80 players and the buy-in was US$14,000. The majority of the competitors were world famous professionals, with the remainder of the field online satellite winners and lesser known professionals.

The 2004 event was dominated nearly start to finish by the world's top tournament player, Phil Ivey. With three players remaining, however, he was outdrawn by Jani Sointula, who would go on to take the title and US$400,000 first prize.

In November 2005, the second MCM tourney featured a 120 player field and a $25,000 buyin. It featured the largest prize pool in European History up to that point, $3 million, with $1 million going to the winner. The tournament was notable for offering the last spot at the final table to the winner of a "second chance" tournament with a field consisting of the players eliminated from the main event. Ivey won the 2005 tournament over Paul Jackson. Ivey went on to win a second single table invitational tournament adjunct to the Monte Carlo Millions the next day.

The Monte Carlo Millions has been broadcast in the UK on Pokerzone. In the United States the event aired on Fox Sports Net. In Canada it was broadcast on CGTV (now GameTV).
