= Celebrity Poker Showdown =

- Genre: Game show
- Starring: Dave Foley (2004–06); Phil Gordon (2003–05); Phil Hellmuth (2006); Kevin Pollak (2003); Robert Thompson (2003–06)
- Country of origin: United States
- Original language: English
- No. of seasons: 5
- No. of episodes: 48

Production
- Executive producers: Marcia Mulé; Bryan Scott; Joshua Malina; Andrew Hill Newman
- Production locations: The Palms Casino, Paradise, Nevada (2003–2005); Harrah's, New Orleans (2006)
- Running time: 120 minutes Six episodes were 1 hour

Original release
- Network: Bravo
- Release: December 2, 2003 – July 5, 2006

Celebrity Poker Showdown is an American celebrity game show that aired on the cable network Bravo from 2003 to 2006. It was a limited-run series in which celebrities played poker, with eight tournaments during its five-season run.

In each show, five celebrities played a no limit Texas hold 'em tournament for charity. The winners of each qualifying game won a silver commemorative poker chip and advanced to the championship game. The winner of the championship game won the grand prize for their charity as well as a gold commemorative poker chip. Each tournament featured 25 celebrities and consisted of six episodes, five qualifying games and one championship game.

In an interview with TV Guide, host Dave Foley said that a ninth tournament is not being produced, as Bravo did not order any new episodes.

== Setup, logistics, and personalities ==
The first seven tournaments were taped at the Palms Casino in Paradise, Nevada in front of a live studio audience. With the eighth tournament, Harrah's Entertainment became the "official casino of Celebrity Poker Showdown."

When a player was eliminated, he or she moved to the "Loser's Lounge" to watch the rest of the game. With the move to New Orleans for the eighth tournament, the Lounge was renamed for sponsor Southern Comfort as the "SoCo Lime Lounge".

The first series was hosted by actor/comedian Kevin Pollak; the episodes of that run were an hour in length, except for the Championship telecast, which was two hours in length. In 2004, the show expanded all episodes to two hours in length, and Dave Foley took over hosting duties. Most episodes of his run were two hours in length, and only one episode (Game 5 telecast of the fifth tournament) was an hour in length. Professional poker player Phil Gordon provided the color commentary for the first seven tournaments. Phil Hellmuth took over the commentary spot in the eighth tournament.

All the games were officiated by Tournament Director Robert Thompson. Thompson used the catchphrase "Shuffle up and deal!"

Several celebrities appeared in multiple tournaments, and five won games in separate tournaments. David Cross won in the first and third tournaments; Dulé Hill won in the second and seventh; Kevin Nealon won in the fourth and seventh; Jason Alexander won in the fifth and eighth; and Michael Ian Black won in the second and eighth tourneys. No celebrity won more than one championship game.

The series was produced by Andrew Hill Newman and Joshua Malina.

== Tournament winnings ==
The first six tournaments were played for a total of $250,000 in prize money as follows:

- The four players eliminated in each of the first 5 games: $5,000 each
- Fifth Place in the Championship: $7,500
- Fourth Place in the Championship: $10,000
- Third Place in the Championship: $12,500
- Second Place in the Championship: $20,000
- First Place in the Championship: $100,000

Starting with the Seventh Tournament, the "prize pool" was increased to $1,000,000 and divided as follows:

- The four players eliminated in each of the first 5 games: $5,000 each
- Fifth Place in the Championship: $25,000
- Fourth Place in the Championship: $75,000
- Third Place in the Championship: $100,000
- Second Place in the Championship: $200,000
- First Place in the Championship: $500,000

== Tournament results ==
=== First tournament ===
Game Number Two featured a themed show featuring cast members from The West Wing.

- Game 1: Willie Garson, Ben Affleck, Don Cheadle, Emily Procter, David Schwimmer
- Game 2: Richard Schiff, John Spencer, Timothy Busfield, Allison Janney, Martin Sheen
- Game 3: Nicole Sullivan, Hank Azaria, Michael Ian Black, Peter Facinelli, Mo Gaffney
- Game 4: Paul Rudd, Coolio, Shannon Elizabeth, Ron Livingston, Sarah Silverman
- Game 5: David Cross, Carrie Fisher, Tom Green, Mimi Rogers, Scott Stapp
- The Championship Game: Nicole Sullivan, David Cross, Willie Garson, Paul Rudd, Richard Schiff

Nicole Sullivan won this tournament's championship, televised January 13, 2004.

=== Second tournament ===
- Game 1: Jerome Bettis, Rosario Dawson, Mena Suvari, Wanda Sykes, Travis Tritt
- Game 2: Timothy Busfield, Mo Gaffney, Dulé Hill, Danny Masterson, James Woods
- Game 3: Michael Ian Black, Star Jones Reynolds, Norm Macdonald, Adam Rodriguez,^{1} Jeremy Sisto
- Game 4: Sean Astin, Lauren Graham, Chris Masterson, Matthew Perry, Sara Rue
- Game 5: James Blake, Jon Favreau, Andy Richter, Tom Everett Scott, Maura Tierney
- The Championship Game: Rosario Dawson, Dulé Hill, Michael Ian Black, Lauren Graham, Maura Tierney

Maura Tierney won this tournament's championship, televised July 1, 2004.
^{1} Macdonald eliminated Rodriguez in the first hand of the tournament, the only time that has happened in the show's run.

=== Third tournament ===
Game Number Three featured four members of the Arrested Development cast.

- Game 1: Willie Garson, Jennie Garth, Richard Kind, Dave Navarro, Jerry O'Connell
- Game 2: Angie Dickinson, Jeff Gordon, Kathy Griffin, Penn Jillette, Ron Livingston
- Game 3: Will Arnett, Jason Bateman, David Cross, Peter Facinelli, Judy Greer
- Game 4: Michael Badalucco, Bobby Flay, Steve Harris, Kathy Najimy, Mimi Rogers
- Game 5: Hank Azaria, Seth Meyers, Gail O'Grady, Amy Poehler, Jeffrey Ross
- The Championship Game: David Cross, Steve Harris, Jeff Gordon, Seth Meyers, Dave Navarro

Seth Meyers won this tournament's championship, televised August 12, 2004.

=== Fourth tournament ===
- Game 1: Christopher Meloni, Matthew Perry, Stephen Root, Sarah Silverman, Michael Vartan
- Game 2: Bobby Cannavale, Tony Hawk, Cheryl Hines, Dennis Rodman, Ryan Stiles
- Game 3: Macaulay Culkin, Neil Flynn, Sara Gilbert, Ricki Lake, Kevin Nealon
- Game 4: Chevy Chase, Donny Deutsch, Shannon Elizabeth, Kathy Griffin, Neil Patrick Harris
- Game 5: Angela Bassett, Jeff Garlin, Dave Navarro, Mekhi Phifer, Emily Procter
- The Championship Game: Matthew Perry, Dennis Rodman, Kevin Nealon, Neil Patrick Harris, Mekhi Phifer

Mekhi Phifer won this tournament's championship, televised November 14, 2004.

=== Fifth tournament ===
- Game 1: Curt Schilling, Brad Garrett, Catherine O'Hara, Sara Rue, Ray Romano
- Game 2: Jason Alexander, Nicholas Gonzalez, Allison Janney, Chris Kattan, Mary McCormack
- Game 3: Lacey Chabert, Bonnie Hunt, J.K. Simmons, Robert Wagner, Scott Wolf
- Game 4: Brandi Chastain, Camryn Manheim, Colin Quinn, Tom Verica, Kevin Weisman
- Game 5^{1}: Heather Graham, Jesse Metcalfe, Andrea Parker, Malcolm-Jamal Warner, Fred Willard
- The Championship Game: Brad Garrett, Jason Alexander, Bonnie Hunt, Colin Quinn, Malcolm-Jamal Warner

Brad Garrett won this tournament's championship, televised March 1, 2005.
^{1}This game was only one hour in length, as Malcolm Jamal-Warner won the game in 19 hands.

=== Sixth tournament ===
The sixth tournament premiered August 18, 2005 with a themed show, featuring players notable for reality television appearances.

- Game 1: Charla Faddoul, Trishelle Cannatella, Andrew Firestone, Jonny Fairplay, Omarosa
- Game 2: Bryan Cranston, Howie Mandel, ^{1} Stephen Collins, Peter Dinklage, Meat Loaf ^{1}
- Game 3: Kathy Najimy, Ricki Lake, Sharon Lawrence, Kathryn Morris, Caroline Rhea
- Game 4: Anthony Anderson, Cheryl Hines, Amber Tamblyn, Alex Trebek, Michael Vartan
- Game 5: Rosie O'Donnell^{2}, Penny Marshall, Travis Tritt, Eddie Cibrian, Mo Gaffney, ^{2} ^{3}
- The Championship Game: Andrew Firestone, Stephen Collins, Kathy Najimy, Cheryl Hines, Eddie Cibrian

Kathy Najimy won this tournament's championship, televised on September 22, 2005.
^{1} Collins eliminated Mandel and Meat Loaf on the same hand, the first time this happened during the show's run.
^{2} Tritt eliminated O'Donnell and Gaffney on the same hand.
^{3} This was Gaffney's third appearance on the show. She was the first person to play in three different tournaments.

=== Seventh tournament ===
The seventh tournament premiered October 13, 2005, with a themed show featuring male stars from Desperate Housewives, and a $1 million (US) prize pool, with $500,000 going to the winners' charity. (The players are listed first to last place)

- Game 1: Steven Culp, Ricardo Chavira, James Denton, Doug Savant, Mark Moses
- Game 2: Barry Corbin, Gina Gershon, Joey Fatone, James Woods, Andy Richter
- Game 3: Dulé Hill, Kathleen Madigan, Kelli Williams, Carlos Bernard, Bill Brochtrup
- Game 4: Kevin Nealon, Nicholas Gonzalez, Dean Cain, Richard Belzer, Oksana Baiul
- Game 5: Wendy Pepper, Ian Gomez, Camryn Manheim^{1}, Alison Sweeney^{1}, Jeremy London
- The Championship Game: Steven Culp, Dulé Hill, Kevin Nealon, Wendy Pepper, Barry Corbin.

Steven Culp won the series' seventh tournament final, aired on November 17, 2005.
^{1} Gomez eliminated Manheim and Sweeney on the same hand.

=== Eighth tournament ===
The eighth tournament premiered May 31, 2006, at Harrah's New Orleans, with the celebrities donating their winnings to charities benefiting victims of Hurricane Katrina. It also featured a $1 million prize pool sponsored by PartyPoker.net. (The players are listed first to last place.)

- Game 1: Jason Alexander, Bryan Cranston, Susie Essman, Jamie Bamber, Kevin Sorbo
- Game 2: Michael Ian Black^{1}, Greg Behrendt, Jorge Garcia,^{2} Kim Coles,^{2} Andrea Martin ^{2}
- Game 3: Ida Siconolfi,^{3} Fred Savage, Jennifer Tilly, Doug E. Doug,^{4} Brett Butler ^{4}
- Game 4: Keegan-Michael Key, Jenna Fischer, Mario Cantone, Rocco DiSpirito, Jordan Peele
- Game 5: Robin Tunney, Christopher Meloni, Macy Gray, Joy Behar, Andy Dick
- The Championship Game: Jason Alexander, Robin Tunney, Michael Ian Black, Ida Siconolfi, Keegan-Michael Key

Jason Alexander won the tournament final, aired July 5, 2006. He came back from having been down to $11,000 in chips, with Michael Ian Black having had nearly 80% of the chips on the table. Alexander's comeback is the best in the history of the show. Robin Tunney, who also had a dramatic shift in chip totals during the game, finished a strong second to Alexander after Black's collapse. Tunney won $200,000 for her charity, while Alexander received $500,000 for his.

^{1} Michael Ian Black was the second person to play in three different tournaments.
^{2} Black eliminated Coles, Garcia, and Martin in three consecutive hands, a first for the series.
^{3} Siconolfi won Bravo's online poker tournament in late 2005 and became the first non-celebrity player to compete on the show.
^{4} Tilly eliminated both Doug E. Doug and Brett Butler in the same hand.

== Post-show poker ==
Some of the celebrities on this series have parlayed their game play into visits onto the World Poker Tour and the World Series of Poker. In 2005, Brad Garrett, Shannon Elizabeth, Nicholas Gonzalez, and James Woods all participated in the WSOP's $10,000 Texas Hold-Em Main Event. In 2007, Shannon Elizabeth advanced to the semifinals of the NBC National Heads-Up Poker Championship.

In 2005, prior to appearing on the show, Jennifer Tilly won a WSOP Gold Bracelet for coming in first in the Ladies' No-Limit Texas Hold 'Em event, and won the third annual WPT Ladies Invitational Tournament.

== Parodies ==
For the December 10, 2005 episode of Saturday Night Live, Foley and Gordon lent their voices (playing themselves) to a Robert Smigel animated TV Funhouse parody called "Celebrity Mugshot Poker," where, as the title suggests, various celebrities (like Nick Nolte and James Brown) are represented by animated versions of their infamous mugshots.

Saturday Night Live also did a parody of this show on the season 29 episode hosted by Will & Grace star Megan Mullally as Tammy Faye Messner, with Phil Gordon played by Chris Parnell and comedian Kevin Pollak played by Jimmy Fallon.

MADtv did a parody of this show as a ninth and tenth season recurring sketch called "Celebrity Quarters" (based on the drinking game "quarters") with Ron Pederson as Dave Foley and, replacing Phil Gordon, was Nick Nolte (played by Ike Barinholtz) with various celebrities (like Anna Nicole Smith played by Stephnie Weir and Kathy Griffin played by Nicole Parker).

For the November 3, 2005 episode of the sitcom Joey, Foley and Gordon played themselves in a fictitious tournament in which the character of Joey (played by Matt LeBlanc) participates based on bad advice and incorrect rules from his neighbor, Alex, who is trying to sabotage his efforts. This includes a so-called Texas Earthquake that occurs when one card of each suit is present in the face-up community cards, during which Joey believes that players jump onto the table and attempt to steal chips from their opponents.

== See also ==
- List of television shows set in Las Vegas
