= Molecular Cytogenetics =

- Discipline: Cytogenetics, molecular genetics
- Language: English
- Edited by: Thomas Liehr, Henry Heng, Yuri Yurov

Publication details
- History: 2008-present
- Publisher: BioMed Central
- Frequency: Continuous
- Impact factor: 1.506 (2015)

Standard abbreviations
- ISO 4: Mol. Cytogenet.

Indexing
- ISSN: 1755-8166
- LCCN: 2008247598
- OCLC no.: 863082427

Links
- Journal homepage; Online access

Molecular Cytogenetics is a continuous, open access, peer-reviewed journal covering research into cytogenetics and its applications throughout the fields of biology and medicine. It was established in 2008 and is published by BioMed Central. The editors-in-chief are Thomas Liehr (Institute of Human Genetics), Henry Heng (Wayne State University School of Medicine), and Yuri Yurov (National Research Center of Mental Health). According to the Journal Citation Reports, the journal has a 2015 impact factor of 1.506.
