= Russ Hamilton (poker player) =

American poker player

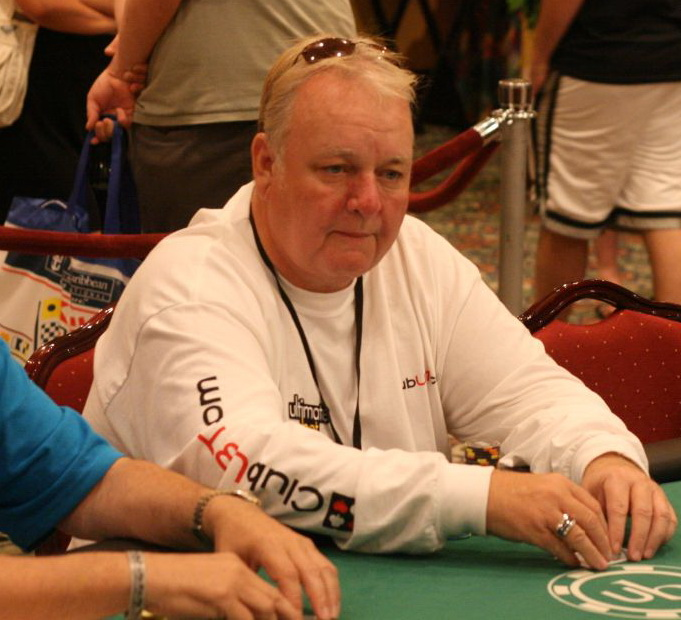
- Hamilton playing at the 2007 UB Aruba Poker Classic
- Born: 1948 or 1949 (age 77–78)

World Series of Poker
- Bracelet: 1
- Money finishes: 8
- Highest WSOP Main Event finish: Winner, 1994

World Poker Tour
- Money finishes: 2

Russ Hamilton (born 1948 or 1949) is an American poker player. He was the 1994 World Series of Poker main event champion, defeating Hugh Vincent in heads-up play to win $1 million in first-prize money as well as his bodyweight in silver. Following his World Series win, Hamilton served as a consultant for Ultimate Bet, an online poker server. In 2008, the Kahnawake Gaming Commission found Hamilton largely responsible for cheating players on Ultimate Bet out of $6.1 million through software that allowed access to opponents' hole cards. In 2009, Kahnawake increased the $6.1 million estimate to $22,100,000.

== Early life and career ==
Hamilton initially attended college in Michigan and pursued a degree in electrical engineering, before a conversation with a professor led him to decide that playing poker for a living would be more profitable. After playing in underground games in Detroit, he moved to Las Vegas at the age of 36. He joined a tournament blackjack team and enjoyed a successful run; however, when tournaments started barring blackjack pros, he turned back to poker. In 1994, he won the World Series of Poker main event bracelet.

He also invented Elimination Blackjack, a tournament Blackjack derivative that was used as the format for the televised Ultimate Blackjack Tour.

Hamilton's last major cash came in the 2006 World Poker Tour PCA Main Event.

As of 2014, his total live tournament winnings exceed $1,525,000. His eight cashes at the WSOP account for $1,261,940 of those winnings.

== UltimateBet fraud ==
Since winning his World Series bracelet, Hamilton has served as a gaming industry expert, including as a consultant for the online poker cardroom UltimateBet, where he was involved in recruiting some prominent poker players, including Phil Hellmuth, to promote the site. He has won World Championships in several types of casino games and founded the Ultimate Blackjack Tour in 2005.

On September 29, 2008, the Kahnawake Gaming Commission stated it had found clear and convincing evidence that, between the approximate dates of May 2004 and January 2008, Russ Hamilton was the main person responsible for, and benefiting from, multiple sophisticated cheating incidents at UltimateBet. UltimateBet eventually refunded a total of $22,100,000 to the defrauded players.

In October 2008, 60 Minutes aired a report profiling Hamilton and called the fraud the biggest scandal in the history of online gambling. 60 Minutes partnered with the Washington Post in their investigation.

== World Series of Poker Bracelet ==
Year	Tournament	Prize (US$)
1994	$10,000 No Limit Hold'em World Championship	$1,000,000
