= All In (magazine) =

All In Magazine
- Editor-in-Chief: Eric Raskin
- Frequency: Monthly
- Founder: Bhu Srinivasan and Kasey Thompson
- Founded: 2004
- First issue: May 2004
- Company: All In Media House
- Country: United States
- Based in: Scottsdale, Arizona
- Language: English
- Website: allinmag.com at the Wayback Machine (archived 2017-09-23)
- ISSN: 1554-7167

All In was an American print magazine and website focusing on poker, fantasy sports, and eSports (competitive videogaming). The magazine was founded as the "poker boom" was taking off in 2004 and centered primarily on poker until 2013.

== History ==
The original print edition of All In launched at the 2004 World Series of Poker, one year after amateur Chris Moneymaker won the World Series of Poker Main Event and moved poker into the mainstream. The magazine settled into its acclaimed editorial style in 2005, after Eric Raskin was hired as editor-in-chief and Will Tims was hired as art director. The website stopped being updated on July 3, 2017, and fully went offline late September 2017.

== Events ==
=== ALL IN Super Bowl Party ===
In 2014, at Manhattan's Canoe Studios, All In worked with Heineken and Esquire to put on the Esquire Magazine/ALL IN/Heineken 2014 Super Bowl Celebration Charity Poker Party in New York City (the recipient of the evening's fundraising and the administrative entity was Career Gear, a 501 c3 organization).

In 2015, the three-day event in Scottsdale, Arizona, was put together to gain exposure, and raise money for All In Cause with numerous celebrity personalities in attendance.

== Poker Player of the Year ==
All In awarded an annual Poker Player of the Year honor based on a poll of poker professionals.

=== Year and player ===
- 2005 - Phil Ivey
- 2006 - Allen Cunningham
- 2007 - J.C. Tran
- 2008 - John Phan
- 2009 - Phil Ivey
- 2010 - Michael Mizrachi
- 2013 - Daniel Negreanu
- 2014 - Daniel Colman
