= Shovel racing =

Sliding sport

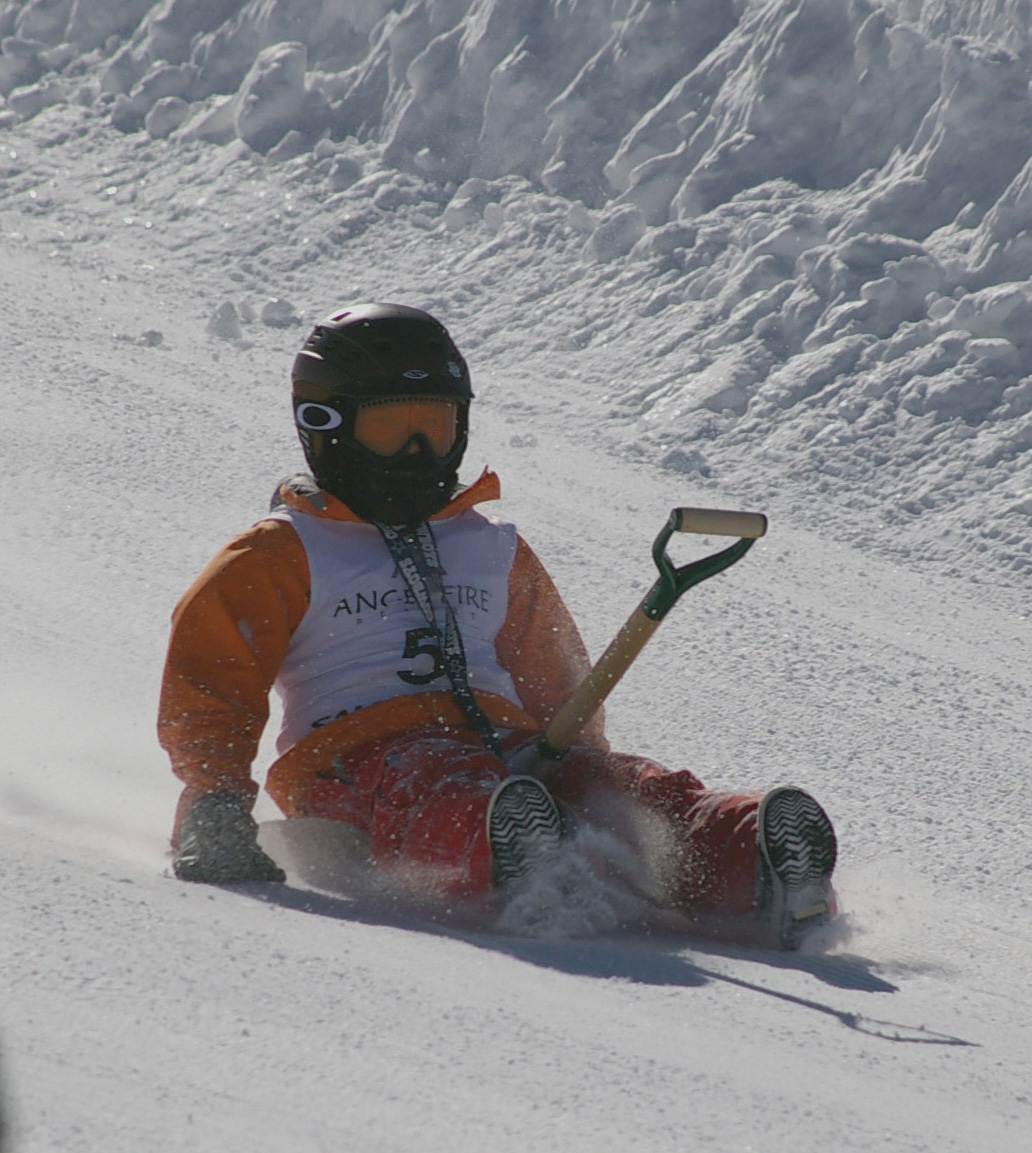
Shovel racing at Angel Fire Resort in 2011

Shovel Racing is a sport practiced in some parts of the United States. It consists of riders racing down a snowy hill riding on a shovel. It has been practiced on both typical snow shovels and modified shovel-based sleds. It was once an event in the winter X games, but was removed due to safety concerns.

== History ==
Competitive shovel racing has its roots in New Mexico's ski resorts in the 1970s. Creator Damien Deleon has been unofficially credited as the "king of shovel racing." It began after ski resort workers used shovels as sleds to quickly move from one location to another. The sport reached the zenith of its popularity in 1997 when it was featured in the Winter X Games, although the games organizers later removed the sport in future X Games after athlete Justin Williams died during the games. The most prominent competition is held at the Angel Fire Resort in Angel Fire, New Mexico. In 2005, the resort that hosted the largest annual competition dropped the event due to liability concerns, but it resumed in 2010 after modified sleds were banned from competition. Riders often decorate their sleds with custom paint jobs. There is a wide age range in competitors, including students and retirees.

== Rules ==
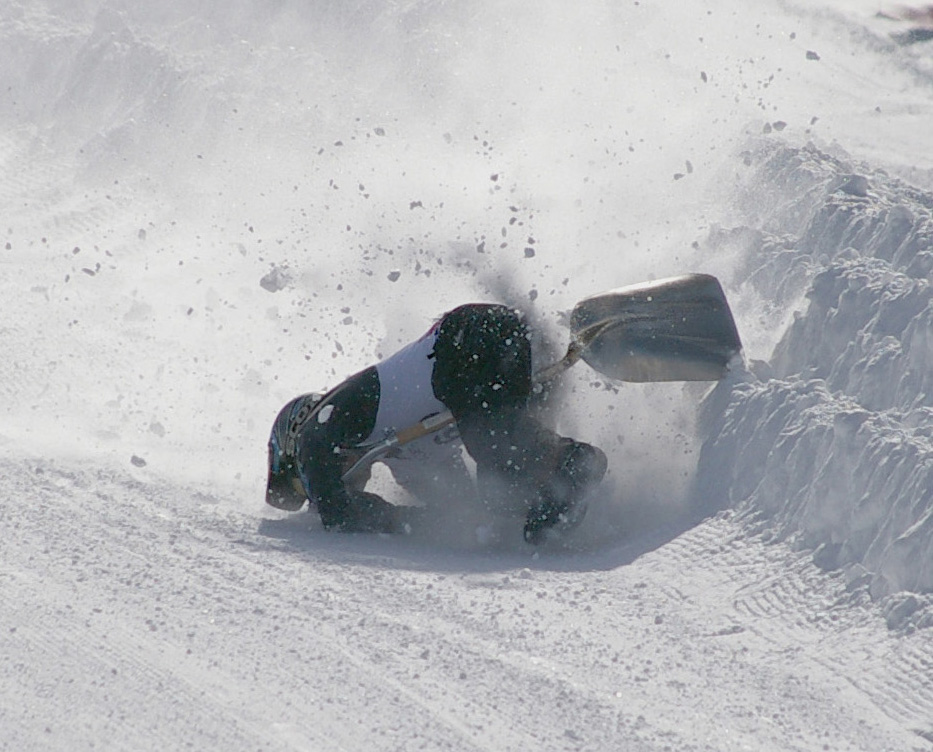
Shovel racer after losing control

The shovel racer typically races on a basic snow shovel. The rider sits in the shovel facing the handle and leans back with his feet pointed forwards. In some cases, racers in the "super-modified shovel" category have raced on sleds that run on skiis, have an aerodynamic pod and roll cage around the driver, and only include a shovel as decoration. Competitors generally wax the underside of the shovel in order to increase its speed. The top speed of elite shovel racers can range up to 72 miles per hour (115.87 km/h).
