= Celebrity Blackjack =

American television program

- Presented by: Alex Borstein; Matt Vasgersian
- Country of origin: United States
- Original language: English
- No. of seasons: 2
- No. of episodes: 19

Production
- Production company: Pariah Entertainment Group

Original release
- Network: GSN
- Release: July 5, 2004 – January 11, 2005

Celebrity Blackjack is an American television show where celebrities played tournament style blackjack for charity. It aired on the Game Show Network.

The snow was hosted by Matt Vasgersian (and Alex Borstein in the first season). Dave Stann was the dealer. Season 1 aired weekly from July 5, 2004, through August 9, 2004. Season 2 premiered October 12, 2004, and ran weekly through January 11, 2005.

== Overview ==
=== Season 1 ===
Five celebrities started each tournament with $100,000 in tournament chips and played 21 hands of blackjack. All celebrities will pick up $10,000 just for sitting down at the table and playing. There are five preliminary tables and one final table.

Minimum bets were $1,000 and maximum bets were $25,000 for the first ten hands. For hand 11-20, the minimum bet was $5,000 and there was no maximum bet. Double down for less is permitted. All bets throughout the tournament MUST be in $1,000 increments. A player cannot bet the remaining $500 which it would count as an all-in bet when the minimum bet is $5,000. However, a player may use the remaining $500 for the insurance. Insurance pays 2 to 1. Blackjack pays 3 to 2. The bets for the 21st and final hand were secret, with each player writing the bet out prior to the hand being played.

The deck included four jokers into the six decks they play with. Whatever a player is dealt with a joker card as one of the first 2 cards, a player will have a choice to replace any card on the table still in play once a player has received their first two cards (meaning, once a hand is stood on, it's no longer in-play). A player can also take the dealer's up card, if they wish.

==== Final table results ====
Position	Player	Charity
1	Caroline Rhea	Much Love Animal Rescue and Project ALS
2	Billy Baldwin^{1}	Tribal Heart
3	Dean Cain	The Malibu Foundation for Youth and Families
4	Ben Stein	Friends of Animals
5	Shannon Elizabeth	Animal Avengers

Caroline Rhea was the champion of Season 1, she won the title and $100,000 USD for her charities.
^{1} Billy Baldwin (who lost to Ben Stein in the preliminary table) will be filling in for his wife, Chynna Phillips, who won her preliminary table.

=== Season 2 ===
The play for the second season of Celebrity Blackjack was the same, with the following exceptions:

- There were four celebrities per table instead of five. There are 10 preliminary tables. Two semi-final tables and one final table.
- The deck included six jokers instead of four into the six decks they play with when there's only four celebrities. Whatever a player is dealt with a joker card as one of the first 2 cards, a player will have a choice to replace any card on the table still in play once a player has received their first two cards (meaning, once a hand is stood on, it's no longer in-play). A player can also take the dealer's up card, if they wish.
- The tournament featured ten preliminary rounds, two semi-final rounds, and a final table. Each preliminary table had four celebrities and each semi-final table had five players that won their preliminary round. The top two finishers from each of the two five-person semis round will move on to the Final table for a chance at winning an additional $200,000 for their charity.
- The winner of the preliminary round will receive $25,000 for their charity and move on to the semis round. For the Semis Round, the top two finishers (meaning first place will win an additional $75,000 and second place will win an additional $50,000) will move on to the Final table. For the final table, first place will win an additional $200,000, second place will win additional $50,000, and the last two ... they still have at least $50,000 to give from the preliminaries and the semis.
- The five card charlie was in effect. Players holding five cards without going over 21, automatically won the hand.

==== Final table results ====
Position	Player	Charity
1	Jason Alexander	Oakwood School Capital Campaign
2	Jeff Probst^{1}	Animal Avengers
3	Kelli Williams	CARE & The Young Storytellers
4	Lance Bass	Animal Avengers

Jason Alexander was the champion of Season 2, he won the title and $300,000 USD for his charity.

^{1} Jeff Probst (who lost to Jason Alexander by $14,000 in the 1st preliminary table) ; filled in for Shannon Elizabeth, who won her preliminary table; finished in 2nd Place and pick up $50,000 more for Animal Avengers.
