= Phil Gordon (poker player) =

American poker player (born 1970)

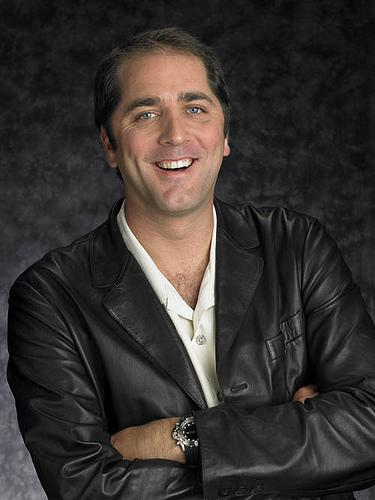
- Gordon at the Caesars Palace Poker Blog Tournament in 2011
- Nickname: Tiltboy
- Born: July 6, 1970 (age 56); El Paso, Texas

World Series of Poker
- Bracelet: None
- Money finishes: 18
- Highest WSOP Main Event finish: 4th, 2001

World Poker Tour
- Title: 1
- Final table: 1
- Money finish: 1

Philip Stewart Gordon (born July 6, 1970) is an American professional poker player, commentator and author.

== Personal life ==
Gordon was born in El Paso, Texas. He spent his formative years in Stone Mountain, Georgia. Gordon began attending Georgia Tech at the age of 15 while still attending high school. At the end of the 11th grade and after being awarded the National Merit Scholarship, Gordon dropped out of high school and attended Georgia Tech full-time. Gordon graduated from Georgia Tech with a B.S. degree in computer science in 1991. After stints working at Santa Cruz Operation and Lockheed, Gordon joined start-up Netsys Technologies as their first hired employee. In 1996, Netsys was acquired by Cisco Systems, making him a millionaire, and in 1997 he retired from the high-tech industry to travel the world and to play poker.

Gordon lives in Newport, Washington, with his wife and their two sons.

== Poker ==
=== Live poker ===
==== World Series of Poker ====
Gordon first entered The World Series of Poker (WSOP) Main Event in 2001 and finished fourth, winning nearly $400,000. In 2002, he made two more WSOP final tables, finishing sixth in the $2,000 Pot Limit hold 'em event and third in the $2,500 Omaha Hi/Lo Split event. At the 2005 WSOP, he finished third in the $1,500 No Limit Texas hold 'em Shootout event. Although he made several WSOP final tables, he has yet to win a bracelet. However, he did win the 2010 WSOP Ante Up For Africa event, defeating actress Shannon Elizabeth heads up. He donated the entire $129,086 first place prize to the charity.

==== World Poker Tour ====
In March 2004 Gordon knocked out two players at once, one of them former World Series of Poker main event champion Chris Moneymaker, to win the WPT's Bay 101 Shooting Stars tournament. In 2002, Gordon won the professional division of the first UltimateBet Aruba tournament, before losing the championship to the amateur division's winner, Juha Helppi.

World Poker Tour Titles
Year	Tournament	Prize (US$)
2004	$5,000 Bay 101 Shooting Star	$360,000

==== Other events ====
On Thanksgiving Day 2006, Gordon won the Full Tilt Poker Poker Championship at Red Rock, outlasting 5 other notable poker headliners and ultimately defeating Roland De Wolfe heads-up to win a purse of $600,000. Gordon earned $25,000 at the 2007 NBC National Heads-Up Poker Championship tournament, finishing in the final 16. Gordon defeated Scotty Nguyen and 2006 WSOP Main Event champion Jamie Gold to advance.

As of January 2015, Gordon's total live tournament winnings exceed $2,700,000. His 18 WSOP cashes account for $707,537 of his live tournament winnings.

=== Online poker ===
Gordon is part of the group known as the "Tiltboys", who helped design the software that was eventually used by Full Tilt Poker. Gordon was a member of Team Full Tilt.

== Commentary ==
Gordon commentates on poker broadcasts. He was a commentator on Bravo's Celebrity Poker Showdown for seven seasons until 2006. In 2003, he provided commentary for the WSOP Championship Event for Binion's live Internet broadcast, as well as daily reports for a national radio audience, and he provided commentary for ESPN's live pay per view broadcast of the final table of the World Series of Poker main event championship in both 2006 and 2007. He was also the lead broadcaster for the ESPN series, The Pro-Am Poker Equalizer that began airing January 6, 2007.

== Author ==
Gordon has written five books on poker, including the bestsellers Poker: The Real Deal and Phil Gordon's Little Green Book: Lessons and Teachings in No Limit Hold 'em. Gordon has written for poker magazines, and writes a regular column and hosts a podcast, The Poker Edge, for ESPN.com. The podcast has been airing since April 10, 2006. Gordon has also released an award-winning instructional DVD, Expert Insight: Final Table Poker.

== Philanthropy ==
In 2003, Gordon and fellow poker pro Rafe Furst embarked on a trip in which they attended more than 140 sporting events. At each stop, they collected donations, held auctions, and raffled off prizes to benefit the Prevent Cancer Foundation, raising $100,000. During the trip, Gordon and Furst came up with the idea for their Bad Beat on Cancer, an initiative that asks World Series of Poker participants to pledge 1% of any winnings to cancer research. Bad Beat on Cancer has been involved in a number of other endeavors, including an annual charity poker event hosted by the Twitter Poker Tour and held online at Gordon's Full Tilt Poker, as well as a breast cancer charity event, the Bad Beat on Cancer Challenge, which was held in November 2009 on PokerStars. Bad Beat on Cancer has raised over $3 million for cancer prevention research.

== World Series of Rock Paper Scissors ==
As a USA Rock Paper Scissor (USARPS) Head Referee Gordon has hosted an annual $500 World Series of Rock Paper Scissors event in conjunction with the World Series of Poker since 2005. The winner of the WSORPS receives an entry into the WSOP Main Event. The event is an annual fundraiser for the Cancer Research and Prevention Foundation via Gordon's charity Bad Beat on Cancer. Poker player Annie Duke won the Second Annual World Series of Rock Paper Scissors. The tournament is taped by ESPN and highlights are covered during "The Nuts" section of ESPN's annual WSOP broadcast. 2009 was the fifth year of the tournament.

== Tournament bridge ==
Gordon also plays tournament contract bridge. He has won two North American Bridge Championships (NABC) events. In 1990, he won the Red Ribbon Pairs, an event restricted to players with 2000 masterpoints or less. At the 2008 Summer NABC in Las Vegas, Gordon was on the team that won the NABC Open Swiss Teams.

== Other ventures ==
Gordon appeared in the 2007 film The Grand. Directed by Zak Penn, the film was a mockumentary about a long running, annual, winner-take-all Texas Hold 'Em Poker Tournament in Las Vegas. Gordon played himself and was the color commentator of the televised tournament.

== Bibliography ==
- Poker: The Real Deal (2004) ISBN 0689875908
- Phil Gordon's Little Green Book: Lessons and Teachings in No Limit Texas Hold'em (2005) ISBN 1-4169-0367-4
- Phil Gordon's Little Blue Book: More Lessons and Hand Analysis in No Limit Texas Hold'em (2006) ISBN 1-4169-2719-0
- Phil Gordon's Little Black Book: Beginning Poker Lessons and the No Limit Lifestyle (2006) ISBN 1-4169-3641-6
- Phil Gordon's Little Gold Book: Advanced Lessons to Master Poker 2.0 (2011) ISBN 978-1-4516-4159-2
