= Charmaine Clamor =

Filipina singer

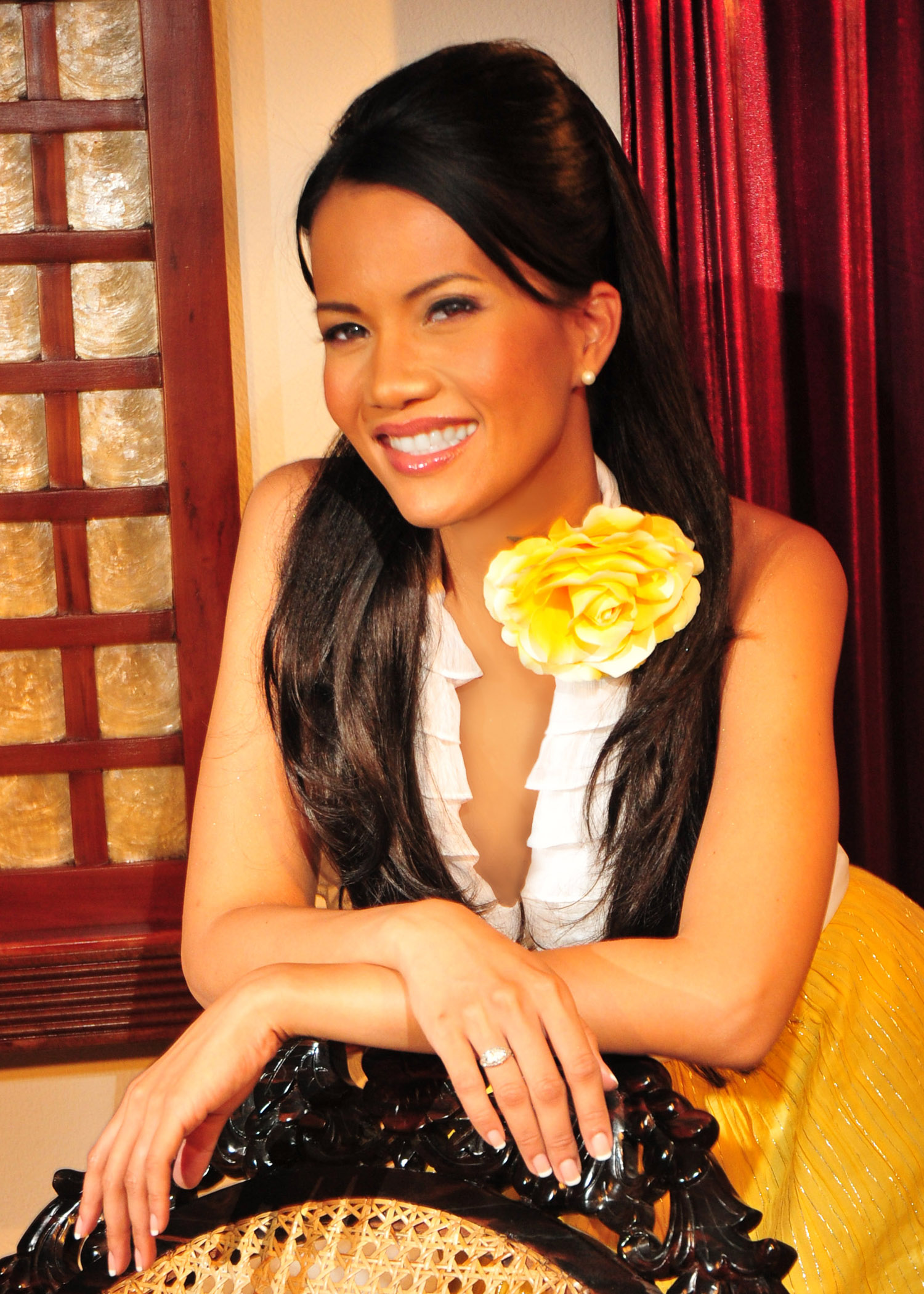

Background information
- Born: Subic, Zambales, Philippines
- Genres: Jazz, folk
- Occupation: Singer
- Website: charmaineclamor.com

Charmaine Clamor is a singer from the Philippines who combines Filipino folk songs with American jazz and blues.

== Biography ==
Born in Subic, Zambales, Philippines, Charmaine Clamor began her singing career at age three, entertaining passengers in buses traveling to Manila. As she grew, she began providing piano accompaniment while her mother sang kundiman (Filipino torch songs) and English language classics. She grew up speaking Tagalog and singing karaoke, moving to the U.S. when she was sixteen years old. She received a master's degree in physical therapy and worked as a physical therapist in hospitals and clinics. She has volunteered for environmental organizations that promote "green living", is a pesco-vegetarian, and grows an organic vegetable garden.

== Career ==
She made the top 5 on the Jazzweek World (No. 2) and Traditional Jazz (No. 4) charts and is the first Filipino-American musician to place two consecutive recordings in the World Music top 10. She records in North America for Michael Konik's label FreeHam Records. She has appeared on NPR's Weekend Edition, BBC's The World, and performed at the San Francisco Filipino-American Jazz Festival. Her second album, Flippin' Out, was released in 2007. She performed at the Iridium Jazz Club in New York City, singing "My Funny Brown Pinay" to the tune of "My Funny Valentine". On April 15, 2008, at her Brooklyn debut, she continued the theme ("Look at my skin—it's brown...Look at my nose—it's flat"). In May 2008 Clamor and eight jazz musicians and bands appeared at the 3rd Annual Miri International Jazz Festival at Parkcity Everly Hotel in Sarawak, Malaysia. In November 2008, Clamor released My Harana: A Filipino Serenade, touring America and the Philippines. In September 2009, Jazzipino was released with a tour in the Philippines.

Clamor is a founding member of JazzPhil-USA, a non-profit organization that promotes jazz musicians of Filipino descent in the United States

== Awards and honors ==
- Named one of the 100 Most Influential Filipino Women in the U.S., Filipino Women's Network
- Named a rising star by jazz critic Brick Wahl, LA Weekly
- Asian Heritage Award in the Performing Arts, San Diego, California, 2009
- Achievement Award in Entertainment, Filipinas magazine, 2009; FAMAS award
- Performed for President Benigno Aquino, 2011

== Discography ==
- Searching for the Soul (FreeHam, 2005)
- Flippin' Out (FreeHam, 2007)
- My Harana: A Filipino Serenade (FreeHam, 2008)
- Something Good (Freeham, 2010)
