= Full Tilt Poker =

Online poker card room

- Type: Subsidiary
- Industry: Online poker
- Founded: June 2004
- Founder: Raymond Bitar and 9 others
- Headquarters: Ireland
- Area served: Worldwide
- Parent: TiltWare (2004–2012); The Stars Group (2012–2021)
- Website: fulltilt.com

Full Tilt Poker was an Irish online poker card room and online casino that opened in June 2004. Formerly privately owned by Tiltware, LLC and later by the Rational Entertainment Group, the site was acquired by The Stars Group (then known as Amaya Gaming Group) in a deal where Amaya acquired all of Rational's assets, including PokerStars. A statement by Amaya said the takeover would not affect the activities of Full Tilt Poker. The deal was closed on August 1, 2014.

Just prior to the close of the purchase, Full Tilt Poker redirected and rebranded its domains from FullTiltPoker.com and FullTiltPoker.eu to FullTilt.com and FullTilt.eu. A company spokesperson stated the change reflected the fact Full Tilt had "expanded to offer a range of single and multi-player variations of casino games".

Full Tilt had gaming licenses in Malta and the Isle of Man.

== Games offered ==
Full Tilt offers both play and real money cash games and tournaments. Freeroll, satellite, sit-n-go, and multi-table tournaments take place throughout the day and often included participation from Full Tilt's sponsored professionals. The site offers the following poker variations in limit, pot-limit, and no-limit: Texas Holdem, Omaha, and Omaha 8 or Better (a.k.a. Omaha hi/lo). The site also offers limit Razz, Stud, Stud 8 or better, Draw poker variants and mixed games such as H.O.R.S.E. Stakes offers ranged from $0.01/$0.02 blinds to $500/1000 blinds in big bet games and up to $2000/4000 limits in limit games.

In early 2010, Full Tilt introduced a new poker variation called "Rush Poker" designed to increase the number of hands a player can play per hour. In "Rush Poker" players do not remain at a specific table. Instead, they join a pool with hundreds of other players. Whenever they fold their hand, they are instantly transferred to a new table and dealt a new hand. Full Tilt Poker also launched Rush Poker Mobile for iOS and Android devices.

== History ==
Full Tilt Poker initially opened as an online poker card room with the involvement of poker professionals Howard Lederer, Phil Ivey, Andy Bloch, Mike Matusow, Jennifer Harman and Chris Ferguson.

Full Tilt Poker was launched by parent company TiltWare, LLC in June 2004 and began full operation on July 10, 2004. The license of Full Tilt Poker was suspended by the Alderney Gambling Control Commission on June 29, 2011, and revoked on September 29, 2011.

=== Legal issues ===
In late 2008, Full Tilt was sued in Nevada by Clonie Gowen, a prominent poker professional and former Full Tilt endorser. She claimed that during Full Tilt's formative year of 2004, she was offered a 1% ownership in the company in exchange for her promotional efforts. The suit was dismissed by a trial court, but later partly reinstated on appeal.

On April 29, 2009, James B. Hicks filed a civil complaint against Tiltware, LLC (doing business as FullTiltPoker.com), TiltProof, Inc., and Chris Ferguson generally alleging unfair and unlawful business practices including illegal Internet gaming and violations of the UIGEA. Hicks sought to prevent Full Tilt from operating its website, soliciting players, or funding or accepting payments for illegal gambling in California.

On September 11, 2009, Full Tilt was sued civilly in Nevada by Jason Newitt in the case of Jason Newitt v. Tiltware; Full Tilt Poker; Pocket Kings Ltd.; Pocket Kings Consulting Ltd.; Ray Bitar; Howard Lederer. Newitt alleges that he was unfairly fired and that his distribution payments were unfairly ceased.

On October 1, 2009, Lary Kennedy and Greg Omotoy filed suit against Full Tilt Poker, Tiltware and several individual members of Team Full Tilt alleging fraud, libel, slander, false advertising, and racketeering. Kennedy and Omotoy filed suit following unsuccessful attempts to have Full Tilt refund $80,000 which it had seized from Kennedy's and Omotoy's accounts asserting a violation of Full Tilt's Terms of Service for using "bots". On October 17, 2009, Full Tilt responded to Kennedy's lawsuit by claiming the suit was baseless and frivolous and stating that it "has never knowingly allowed ‘bots’ to play on its site."

After the case was removed to the United States District Court for the Central District of California, on April 26, 2010, Judge Margaret Morrow dismissed the case with leave stating that Kennedy had failed to "detail many portions of her case regarding state violations and, in particular, there could be no claim under the RICO Act. However, as the case was dismissed with leave, Kennedy may re-file the complaint in federal court if she is able to correct the deficiencies in her original complaint.

On April 5, 2010, the Financial Times reported that a federal grand jury in Manhattan was investigating Full Tilt Poker and individuals associated with the company, including Howard Lederer and Chris Ferguson, for violations of gambling and money-laundering laws. Although neither the Manhattan United States Attorney nor officials with the United States Department of Justice (DOJ) would comment on the matter, it was reported that such an investigation "would fit the federal law enforcement strategy by trying to make an example out of prominent targets". The DOJ maintained that online poker violates the Interstate Wire Act of 1961 (Federal Wire Act), but later changed their opinion on that matter.

On April 15, 2011, the DOJ unsealed an indictment, dated March 10, 2011, against two of the owners/employees (Ray Bitar and Nelson Burtnick) of Full Tilt Poker, along with some of the owners / employees of PokerStars and Absolute Poker. The defendants were charged with fraud, money laundering, and violation of United States federal gambling laws, and certain domain names for the sites were seized by the FBI. The Full Tilt Poker homepage was reinstated six days later on April 20, 2011.

On September 20, 2011, the DOJ accused certain Full Tilt principals of defrauding poker players out of more than $300 million. The U.S. Attorney in the Southern District of New York filed a motion to amend an earlier civil complaint to allege that company directors Chris Ferguson, Howard Lederer, Rafe Furst, and Ray Bitar operated what the DOJ claims was a Ponzi scheme that allowed the company to pay out $444 million to themselves and other owners, which included other famous poker players. Jeff Ifrah, a lawyer for Ferguson, denied the allegations, suggesting that the issues may have been the result of mismanagement rather than malice. Bitar surrendered to authorities on July 2, 2012, to deal with the civil and criminal case that was pending against him in New York. On April 15, 2013, Bitar reached a deal with prosecutors to plead guilty to criminal charges, and was sentenced to time served and ordered to surrender his assets, rumored to include various homes and $40 million in cash.

=== Full Tilt relaunch ===
PokerStars, having acquired the assets of Full Tilt as part of its settlement with the DOJ, reopened Full Tilt Poker on Nov. 6, 2012 to players from most of the world. Customers from the United States could not either sign up for new accounts nor play from their existing accounts. The new Full Tilt Poker remained a standalone site with its own software and player pool separate from that of PokerStars.

On August 1, 2014, Amaya Gaming Group completed the purchase of Rational Group, the owner of PokerStars and Full Tilt, for $4.9 billion. Both poker sites continued to operate as separate entities until May 17, 2016. On that date, the user base of Full Tilt gained access to the global player pool at PokerStars, and the old Full Tilt platform was retired.

=== Ex-members of Team Full Tilt ===
Full Tilt's team of professionals was an integral part of the company's marketing strategy, its slogan being "Learn, Chat and Play with the Pros." "Team Full Tilt" was composed of fourteen noted professionals who played regularly on the site and were considered full-fledged members. In addition to Team Full Tilt, several other pros were "Full Tilt Pros," who were sponsored by the site but were not full-fledged members made up of two teams, CardRunners and The Hendon Mob, there were also an additional 164 "Full Tilt Pros" and 41 non-members made up of authors, celebrities, announcers and commentators, they were known as "Friends of Full Tilt" whose names were also highlighted in red text on the site. Paul DeRosa was last added.

=== Sports sponsorships ===
Full Tilt was a major sponsor of the Formula One racing team, Virgin Racing. It also sponsored a driver in Formula D Joon Maeng along with the Bergenholtz Racing crew, as well as Taylor Barton Racing and the Sydney Roosters of the National Rugby League. Full Tilt was also a prominent sponsor of mixed martial arts (MMA) fighters in the Ultimate Fighting Championship (UFC).

== Full Tilt on television ==
Full Tilt Poker is or has been the principal sponsor of a number of poker television programs, including:

- Learn from the Pros
- Full Tilt Poker Championship at Red Rock
- Poker After Dark
- Pro-Am Poker Equalizer
- Face the Ace
- Late Night Poker
- Poker Million
