= Phil Ivey =

American poker player (born 1977)

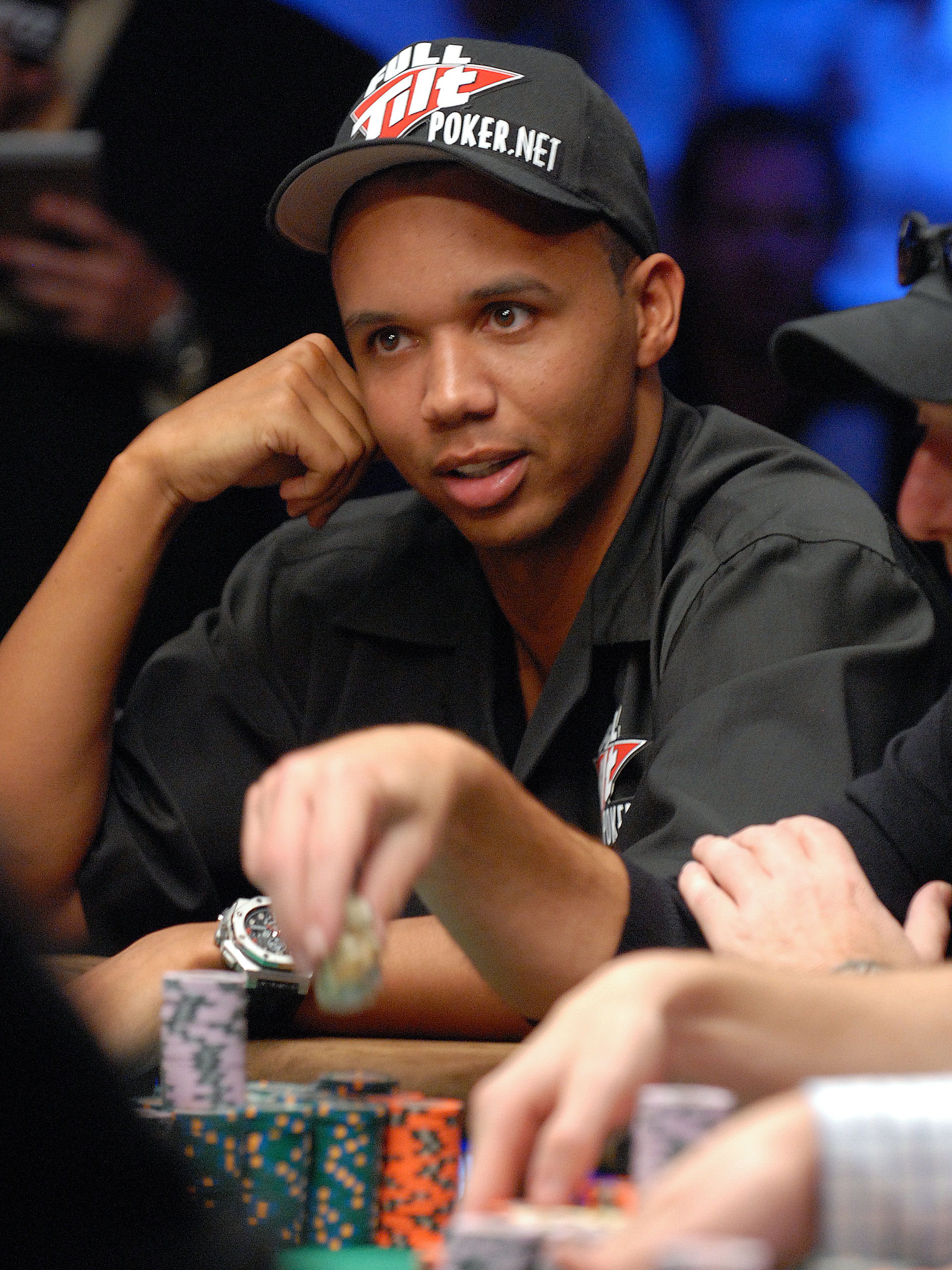
- Ivey at the 2009 World Series of Poker
- Nicknames: "Tiger Woods of Poker" "No Home Jerome" "The Phenom" "Boba Bet"
- Born: Phillip Dennis Ivey Jr. February 1, 1977 (age 49); Riverside, California, U.S.

World Series of Poker
- Bracelets: 11
- Final tables: 49
- Money finishes: 102
- Highest WSOP Main Event finish: 7th, 2009

World Poker Tour
- Titles: 2
- Final tables: 11
- Money finishes: 17

European Poker Tour
- Final table: 1
- Money finishes: 3

Phillip Dennis Ivey Jr. (born February 1, 1977) is an American professional poker player who has won eleven World Series of Poker bracelets, one World Poker Tour title, and appeared at nine World Poker Tour final tables. Ivey is regarded by numerous poker observers and contemporaries as the best all-around player in the world. In 2017, he was elected to the Poker Hall of Fame. He is also an ambassador for WPT Global.

== Background ==
Ivey first began to develop his poker skills by playing against co-workers at a New Brunswick, New Jersey, telemarketing firm in the late 1990s. He was introduced to the game by playing five-card stud with his grandfather as a child. One of his nicknames, "No Home Jerome", stems from the fake ID card he secured to play poker in Atlantic City, New Jersey, in his teenage years. He was given the nickname "The Phenom". His other nickname is "the Tiger Woods of Poker".

== Poker ==
=== Live poker ===
==== World Series of Poker ====
Ivey's first breakthrough at the WSOP came in 2000, when he won a Pot Limit Omaha event for his first career bracelet. In winning the tournament, Ivey was the first person to defeat Amarillo Slim heads-up at a WSOP final table. Ivey's tournament accomplishments include winning three bracelets at the 2002 World Series of Poker, tying Phil Hellmuth Jr, Ted Forrest, and Puggy Pearson for most World Series tournament wins in a single year (Jeff Lisandro and George Danzer have since tied the record). He won a Pot Limit Omaha event once again in 2005 for $635,603.

In 2009, Ivey won his sixth career bracelet in the $2,500 No-Limit 2–7 Draw Lowball Event of the 2009 WSOP. He defeated a field of 147 players to catch his bracelet. He won a heads-up battle against John Monnette. He proceeded to win another bracelet in the $2,500 1/2 Seven Card Stud Hi/Lo 1/2 Omaha Hi/Lo event besting a field of 376 people. He defeated Ming Lee heads-up.

In the 2010 World Series of Poker, Ivey received the most votes for the Tournament of Champions.

At the 2010 WSOP, Ivey won his eighth bracelet in the $3,000 H.O.R.S.E. event in a final table made up of other notable players, which included Bill Chen (2nd), John Juanda (3rd), Jeff Lisandro (5th), and Chad Brown (8th). At the 2024 WSOP, Ivey won his 11th bracelet in the $10,000 Limit 2-7 Lowball Triple Draw Championship for $347,440.

Between 2002 and 2009, Ivey finished among the top 25 players in the Main Event four times, in fields ranging in size from 600 entrants to just under 7,000. Ivey finished 23rd in 2002, 10th in 2003, 20th in 2005, and 7th in 2009. Ivey's 10th place finished in the 2003 WSOP Main Event was one place short of the final table. He was eliminated by eventual champion Chris Moneymaker on a hand where Ivey's full house was defeated by Moneymaker's larger full house on a river card. In his 7th place finish in 2009, his A♣ K♠ lost to Darvin Moon's A♦ Q♠ when a queen paired Moon on the flop; he ended his 2009 Main Event with winnings of $1,404,002.

With 11 World Series of Poker bracelets, Ivey currently has the second most WSOP titles all-time, second only to Phil Hellmuth. Also, at age 38, he was the youngest player to ever win ten bracelets. He broke Hellmuth's mark of 42 years old at the time of his tenth bracelet. In addition, no other player has accumulated ten bracelets more quickly; it took Ivey only 14 years from the time of his first bracelet to his tenth (Hellmuth took 17 years). He is the all-time record holder for most bracelets won in non-Holdem events, with all 11 of his victories coming in non-Holdem events. His 2010 win gave him the lead over Billy Baxter. He is the WSOP record holder for most mixed-game bracelets having won five in his career. He won one in S.H.O.E. in 2002, Omaha Hi/Lo / 7 Card Stud Hi/Lo in 2009, H.O.R.S.E. in 2010, WSOP APAC Mixed Event in 2013, and Eight Game Mix in 2014.

==== Notable World Series of Poker statistics ====
World Series of Poker bracelets
Year	Tournament	Prize (US$/A$)
2000	$2,500 Pot Limit Omaha	$195,000
2002	$2,500 7 Card Stud Hi/Lo	$118,440
2002	$2,000 S.H.O.E.	$107,540
2002	$1,500 7 Card Stud	$132,000
2005	$5,000 Pot Limit Omaha	$635,603
2009	$2,500 No-Limit 2–7 Draw Lowball	$96,367
2009	$2,500 Omaha Hi/Lo / 7 Card Stud Hi/Lo	$220,538
2010	$3,000 H.O.R.S.E.	$329,840
2013A	A$2,200 Mixed Event	A$51,840
2014	$1,500 Eight Game Mix	$166,986
2024	$10,000 Limit 2-7 Lowball Triple Draw Championship	$347,440

WSOP Heads-Up Record
Year	Event	Opponent	Result	Win	Loss	Win%
2000	$2,500 Pot Limit Omaha	Amarillo Slim	Win	X		
2002	$1,500 Limit 7 Card Stud	Toto Leonidas	Win	X		
2002	$2,500 Limit 7 Card Stud Hi/Lo	Sirous Baghchehsaraie	Win	X		
2002	$2,000 Limit S.H.O.E (Event 23)	Diego Cordovez	Win	X		
2003	$3,000 Limit Razz	Huck Seed	Loss		X	
2005	$5,000 Pot Limit Omaha	Robert Williamson III	Win	X		
2006	$5,000 Omaha Hi-Lo Split	Sam Farha	Loss		X	
2007	$10,000 World Championship Seven Card Stud	Chris Reslock	Loss		X	
2009	$2,500 Deuce to Seven Draw Lowball (No-Limit)	John Monnette	Win	X		
2009	$2,500 Omaha/Seven Card Stud HL/8 or Better	Ming Lee	Win	X		
2010	$3,000 H.O.R.S.E.	Bill Chen	Win	X		
2012	$10,000 Pot-Limit Hold'em	Andy Frankenberger	Loss		X	
2013A	$2,200 Mixed Event	Brandon Wong	Win	X		
2014	$1,500 Eight Game Mix	Bruce Yamron	Win	X		
2022	$100,000 High Roller No-Limit Hold’em	Aleksejs Ponakovs	Loss		X	
2024	$10,000 Limit 2-7 Lowball Triple Draw Championship	Danny Wong	Win	X		
				11	5	.6875

WSOP Texas Hold'em Record
Cashes	Final Tables	Wins
41	10	0

WSOP Non-Texas Hold'em Record
Cashes	Final Tables	Wins
53	29	11

up to december 22,2024

WSOP Non-Texas Hold'em Results (ITM Finishes only)
Year	Event	Result	Winnings
2000	Limit 7 Card Stud (Event 3)	12th	$5,145
2000	Pot Limit Omaha (Event 14)	1st	$195,000
2001	Limit Omaha Hi/Lo (Event 23)	6th	$18,165
2002	Limit Omaha Hi/Lo (Event 3)	9th	$7,640
2002	Limit 7 Card Stud (Event 5)	1st	$132,000
2002	Limit 7 Card Stud Hi/Lo (Event 10)	8th	$5,860
2002	Limit 7 Card Stud Hi/Lo (Event 16)	1st	$118,440
2002	Limit Omaha Hi/Lo (Event 20)	14th	$3,720
2002	Limit S.H.O.E (Event 23)	1st	$107,540
2003	Limit Razz (Event 27)	2nd	$36,000
2003	Limit 7 Card Stud (Event 31)	3rd	$53,560
2003	Pot Limit Omaha w/re-buys (Event 33)	9th	$10,720
2005	Omaha Hi-low Split (Event 5)	54th	$2,410
2005	Pot Limit Omaha (Event 27)	1st	$635,603
2006	Limit Hold'em (Event 4)	21st	$9,476
2006	Omaha Hi-low Split (Event 12)	2nd	$219,208
2006	H.O.R.S.E. (Event 20)	3rd	$617,760
2007	World Championship Seven Card Stud (Event 11)	2nd	$143,820
2007	H.O.R.S.E. (Event 26)	4th	$65,424
2008	H.O.R.S.E. (Event 22)	24th	$7,998
2008	World Championship Seven Card Stud (Event 14)	9th	$37,130
2008	World Championship H.O.R.S.E. (Event 45)	12th	$159,840
2008	H.O.R.S.E. (Event 2)	6th	£13,750
2009	Deuce to Seven Draw Lowball (No-Limit) (Event 8)	1st	$96,367
2009	Omaha/Seven Card Stud HL/8 or Better (Event 25)	1st	$220,538
2009	Pot-Limit Omaha (Event 30)	44th	$4,883
2010	Event #27: Seven Card Stud Hi-Low-8 or Better	52nd	$3,182
2010	Event #33: Pot-Limit Hold'em/Omaha	12th	$16,074
2010	Event #37: H.O.R.S.E.	1st	$329,840
2012	Event #15: Seven Card Stud Hi-Low Split-8 or Better	7th	$34,595
2012	Event #24: Omaha Hi-Low Split-8 or Better	3rd	$136,046
2012	Event #32: H.O.R.S.E.	5th	$99,739
2012	Event #35: Mixed Hold'em (Limit/No-Limit)	8th	$21,699
2013A	Event #3: Mixed Event	1st	$51,840
2014	Event #12: Pot-Limit Hold'em	22nd	$5,030
2014	Event #48: Pot-Limit Omaha Hi-Low Split-8 or Better	30th	$6,836
2014	Event #50: Eight Game Mix	1st	$166,986
2018	Event #33: Poker Players Championship	9th	$111,447
2019	Event #58: Poker Players Championship	8th	$124,410
2022	Event #22: Seven Card Stud Championship	3rd	$108,233
2022	Event #32: H.O.R.S.E.	26th	$5,544
2022	Event #63: Pot-Limit Omaha Hi-Lo 8 or Better Championship (8-Handed)	37th	$16,171
2023	Event #43: Poker Players Championship	6th	$228,793
2024	Event #96: $25,000 High Roller H.O.R.S.E.	4th	$239,850

An "A" following a year denotes bracelet(s) won at the World Series of Poker Asia-Pacific

==== World Poker Tour ====
Ivey has reached numerous final tables on the World Poker Tour. During the sixth season of the WPT in February 2008, Ivey made the final table at the LA Poker Classic at Commerce Casino that included Phil Hellmuth and Nam Le, eventually capturing the $1,596,100 first prize and putting an end to his streak of seven WPT final tables without a victory. Ivey has earned over $4 million in WPT cashes. Ivey made his debut on the European Poker Tour in Barcelona, September 2006. He came to the final table of nine as the chip leader, but he eventually finished runner-up to Bjørn-Erik Glenne from Norway.

World Poker Tour Titles
Year	Tournament	Prize (US$)
2008	$10,000 L.A. Poker Classic	$1,596,100

==== Other notable tournaments ====
In 2006, Ivey played in The London All Star Challenge of the inaugural European Poker Masters. Ivey made it to the final table to finish seventh, and collected £6,700 ($12,534). In November 2005, Ivey won the $1,000,000 first prize at the Monte Carlo Millions tournament. The following day, Ivey took home another $600,000 for finishing first at "The FullTiltPoker.Net Invitational Live from Monte Carlo". His six opponents were (in reverse finishing order) Mike Matusow, Phil Hellmuth, Gus Hansen, Chris Ferguson, Dave Ulliott, and John Juanda.

On the January 22, 2007, airing of NBC's Poker After Dark, Ivey won the $120,000 winner-take-all "Earphones Please" tournament by eliminating Matusow, Tony G, Andy Bloch, Hellmuth, and Sam Farha. On the April 15, 2007, airing of NBC's "National Heads-Up Poker Championship", Ivey was defeated by actor Don Cheadle in the first round. That was the third consecutive year where Ivey was eliminated in the first round of this tournament. His streak ended in 2008, when he advanced to the semifinals, losing to eventual champion Ferguson. Ivey took part in seasons three and six of GSN's High Stakes Poker.

On January 29, 2012, Ivey won the Aussie Millions A$250,000 High-roller event, defeating Patrik Antonius heads-up for a prize of A$2,000,000, at the time placing him second in the all-time career tournament earnings. Ivey had placed 12th at the Aussie Millions main event for a prize of A$100,000.

On February 10, 2014, Ivey won the 2014 Aussie Millions LK Boutique $250,000 Challenge for AU$4,000,000 — the largest single cash of his career. In February 2015, he won the Aussie Millions $250,000 Challenge again, this time for AU$2,205,000.

As of 2026, Ivey's total live tournament winnings exceed $54.4 million. He has 14 cashes in his live poker career worth at least $1 million. He is currently ranked 11th on the all-time money list.

Triton

Festival	Tournament	Prize
Montenegro 2018	250K HKD Short Deck Ante Only	HKD 4,749,200
Cyprus 2022 (April)	$75k Short Deck Ante-Only	$1,170,000
Cyprus 2022 (September)	$30k Short Deck Ante-Only	$387,000
London 2023	$60k NLH Turbo	$1,007,000
London 2023	$25k Short Deck Ante-Only	$280,500

==== Cash games ====
Ivey is a regular participant in the $4,000–$8,000 mixed cash game at the Bellagio in Las Vegas (often referred to as the Big Game). In February 2006, he played heads-up Limit Texas Hold'em versus Texas billionaire Andy Beal. With stakes at $25,000/$50,000 and $50,000/$100,000, Ivey won over $16,000,000 over the course of three days, during a heads up match at The Wynn Resort. Ivey was playing for "The Corporation", a group of poker professionals who pooled their money and took turns playing against Beal. Earlier in the month, Beal had beaten the Corporation out of over $13,000,000.

=== Online poker ===
Ivey was part of the original design team for Full Tilt Poker. In May 2011, Ivey filed a lawsuit in Clark County, Nevada claiming Full Tilt had breached his contract. The suit asked for damages in excess of $150,000,000, as well as for him to be released from his contract with the company. Ivey voluntarily withdrew the suit on June 30.

According to HighStakesDB.com, Ivey won $1.99 million on FullTilt in 2007, $7.34 million in 2008, $6.33 million in 2009, and $3 million in 2010.

== Awards ==
- All In Magazine 2005 Poker Player of the Year
- All In Magazine 2009 Poker Player of the Year

== Edge-sorting litigation ==
Ivey has twice been successfully sued by casinos on accusations of breach of contract, both incidents being due to his manipulation of edge sorting. He lost all court challenges (initial and appeals) in both incidents, though an appeal court in the second incident arranged a mediation which led to an agreed settlement between Ivey and the casino.

In August 2012, Ivey was reported to have won £7,300,000 (US$12,000,000) playing Punto banco at Crockfords, a casino in London, but was refused payment beyond his initial £1 million stake due to his use of edge sorting. He issued a statement through his lawyers denying any misconduct: "Any allegations of wrongdoing by Crockfords are denied by me in the very strongest of terms."

In April 2014, the Borgata Casino in Atlantic City, New Jersey sued Ivey, claiming he cheated at baccarat by taking advantage of a defect in the manufacturing of the playing cards. Both Crockfords and the Borgata used the same kind of playing cards, manufactured by Gemaco, at Ivey's demand. The Borgata sued Gemaco as well as Ivey. The US casino sued Ivey for $15.6 million, a total which included $10 million in winnings, $5.4 million the casino’s legal team figured the casino would have beaten Ivey for if he had been playing without an improper advantage, and hundreds of thousands of dollars in comps.

On October 8, 2014, a UK court held that the techniques Ivey used at Crockford's constituted cheating and decided for the casino with costs.

In November 2015, Ivey was given permission to appeal. However, on November 3, 2016, his appeal was dismissed by the Court of Appeal, upholding the earlier decision that the technique amounted to cheating. A further appeal to the Supreme Court of the United Kingdom led to a unanimous judgement delivered on October 25, 2017, which found in favor of the casino. The court concluded that Ivey's actions constituted cheating and that, had it been necessary to make a finding on dishonesty, it would have determined that Ivey's "conduct was dishonest".

In January 2019, a federal judge allowed the Borgata to pursue Ivey's assets in Nevada to recoup more than $10 million he won at the casino using edge-sorting.

On June 27, 2019, the US Marshals Service served a writ of execution to the World Series of Poker and seized Ivey's 2019 winnings to be used towards payment to The Borgata.

After an oral argument on September 17, 2019, the United States Court of Appeals for the Third Circuit referred Ivey and the Borgata to the court’s mediation program. On July 10, 2020, Card Player magazine reported the parties had agreed to a settlement.

== Personal life ==
Ivey was born in Riverside, California, and moved to Roselle, New Jersey, when he was three months old. He graduated from Old Bridge High School in Old Bridge Township, New Jersey.

Ivey resides in Las Vegas. In December 2009, Ivey and his then wife, Luciaetta, filed a joint petition for divorce after seven years of marriage. The divorce was granted on December 29, 2009.

Ivey is a Los Angeles Lakers and Houston Rockets fan. Aside from poker, Ivey's hobbies include sports betting, prop betting, and golf. He participated in the inaugural World Series of Golf, where he finished in fourth place in the final group.

Ivey has given money to a number of charitable causes. In March 2008, he donated $50,000 to Empowered 2 Excel, a Las Vegas charity for underprivileged children, and later that week created the Budding Ivey Foundation, a non-profit organization to continue the work of his grandfather, Leonard "Bud" Simmons. The foundation raised $260,000 (mostly for Empowered 2 Excel) at a July 3, 2008, charity poker tournament, and is also involved in children's literacy projects and programs to feed the homeless. In 2010, he also partnered with the Make-A-Wish Foundation to bring three children to the Bellagio casino in Las Vegas. Each child was given $100 and competed in roulette, baccarat, and craps with Ivey. Ivey has also founded two companies. Ivey Poker, established in 2012 offers a "play for free" poker App that allows users to compete against Ivey and other pros. Ivey League was a poker training site with a full roster of professional coaches launched in 2014.

== See also ==
- Ivey v Genting Casinos
