= Max Rubin =

American writer on gambling

Max Rubin is a gambling expert and author best known for his book Comp City: A Guide to Free Gambling Vacations. The book teaches players how to maximize casino perks with little actual wagering. Rubin is also a gambling analyst for television; he served as commentator for the first two seasons of the GSN's World Series of Blackjack, along with Matt Vasgersian, and co-hosts the Ultimate Blackjack Tour with Nick GAS' Mati Moralejo on CBS. Rubin is a member of the Blackjack Hall of Fame and hosts the annual Blackjack Ball.

Rubin has frequent speaking engagements across the country. Additionally, he has also done consulting work for many casinos including Harrah's, Hilton Casinos, and Mirage Resorts, and he now exclusively teaches the staff at the Barona Casino in San Diego how to spot and counter many cheating techniques.
