= Ultimate Blackjack Tour =

The Ultimate Blackjack Tour was a televised series of Elimination Blackjack tournaments that aired in syndication. It debuted on September 16, 2006. The show consists of a series of televised Elimination Blackjack tournaments. The winner of each weekly tournament returns for the final Tournament of Champions.

Along with professional blackjack players and Internet qualifiers, the producers included a number of professional poker players not normally known for playing blackjack to draw attention to the poker elements inherent in the unique format of Elimination Blackjack tournaments.

The show was executive produced by Houston Curtis and his production company with additional EP's, Jon Moonves and Sam Korkis. UBT was hosted by Max Rubin and Mati Moralejo, with Nikki Ziering and Shandi Finnessey serving as sideline reporters. Nikki Ziering did not return for the second season. Anthony Curtis conducted the analysis of all hands shown and wrote the commentary.

Featured players of the Ultimate Blackjack Tour are members of Team UBT, which is made up of poker stars like Johnny Chan, Robert Williamson III, and Phil Laak and professional blackjack players like world champions Ken Einiger and Anthony Curtis, Mike Aponte, James Grosjean, "Hollywood" Dave Stann and Monica Reeves.

== Season 1 ==
The first season consisted of ten televised tournaments. The winner of each of seven preliminary tournaments returned for the final Tournament of Champions. Players competed for a share of over $1 million. Two of the episodes, "Ladies' Night" and the "UBT Legends Tournament," were not qualifiers for the Tournament of Champions.

=== Tournament results ===
Tournament	Winner	Runner-Up	Other Players in Finish Order
Tournament 1	Ken Smith	"Hollywood" Dave Stann	Michael Postle; "Miami" John Cernuto; Michael Castellana; Alex Brenes; Chuck Gorson
Tournament 2	David Matthews	Joanna "Queen of Spades" W.	Jimmy Pine; Eric Bloore; James Grosjean; Robert Blechman; Antonio Esfandiari
Tournament 3	Lupe Sherman	Tyrone Jackson	Willard Dubois; Erica Schoenberg; David "Devilfish" Ulliott; Fred David; Ron Saccavino
Tournament 4	Monica Reeves	Chuck Gorson	Klara Lato; Mark Kroon; Michael Castellana; Steven Suh; Gary "Debo" DeBernardi
Tournament 5	Adriana Jade	Blair Rodman	Spencer Mohler; Patrick Taylor; Norm Sheridan; S.H. Long; Dewey Tomko
"Ladies' Night"^{1}	Angie "Moneytaker" Hardy	Monica Reeves	Jennifer Tilly; Erica Schoenberg; Klara Lato; Annie Duke; Clonie Gowen
Tournament 6	"Rock & Roll" Darrell Arnold	Gary "Debo" DeBernardi	"Miami" John Cernuto; Kevin Blackwood; Artie Cobb; Shawn Rice; Previn Mankodi
Tournament 7	"Hollywood" Dave Stann	Erica Schoenberg	Skip Samad; Freddy Deeb; Dennis Novinskey; Matt Davidow; Jennifer Tilly
Season 1 Championship	David Matthews	Adrianna Jade	Darrell Arnold; "Hollywood" Dave Stann; Ken Smith; Tyrone Jackson; Monica Reeves
"UBT Legends Tournament"	Ken Einiger	Anthony Curtis	"MIT Mike" Aponte; Stanford Wong; James Grosjean; Ken Smith; David Matthews

^{1} Not a qualifier tournament for the Season 1 Championship table

== Season 2 ==
=== Tournament results ===
Tournament	Winner	Runner-Up	Other Players in Finish Order
Tournament 1	Cosimo Tripodl	James Nguyen	Gleb Bourianoff; "Miami" John Cernuto; Marie Hua; Gary Biedrzyck; Huan Quan Mai
Tournament 2	Erlinda Sotto	Brian Soper	"Hollywood" Dave Stann; John Smith; Ahmet Akdeniz; Matti Shuale; Michael Toomey
Tournament 3	Blair Rodman	Anthony Curtis	David Crawford; Christian Guitron; Kevin Zarnick; John Schultz; Antonio Esfandiari
Tournament 4	"Hollywood" Dave Stann	Annie Duke	Johnny Chan; Jennifer Tilly; Joe Pane; Anthony Curtis; Fred David
Tournament 5	Adriana Jade	Ken Eineger	Freddie Deeb; Martin Pollak; Phil Hellmuth; Barry Shulman; David Matthews
Tournament 6	James Grosjean	Robert Williamson III	Monica Reeves; Blair Rodman; "Miami" John Cernuto; Antonio Esfandiari, Ken Smith (tie)
"All-Stars Tournament"	Phil Hellmuth	René Angélil	Freddie Deeb; Annie Duke; "Hollywood" Dave Stann; Robert Williamson III; Ken Einiger
