= Mark Twain Casino =

Coordinates: 40°02′10″N 91°29′59″W

- Interactive map of Mark Twain Casino
- Location: La Grange, Missouri; 104 Pierce St
- Opened: July 25, 2001
- Gaming space: 18,000 sq ft (1,700 m^{2})
- Notable restaurants: Fireside Sports Bar & Grill
- Casino type: Riverboat
- Owner: Affinity Interactive
- Previous names: Terrible's Mark Twain Casino (2005-2011)
- Website: MarkTwainCasinoLaGrange.com

Mark Twain Casino is a casino located in La Grange, Missouri owned by Affinity Interactive. LaGrange is in Northeast Missouri and sits on the Mississippi River. The property has an 18,000 sq ft (1,700 m^{2}) casino. The casino floor has over 400 slot machines and video poker, as well as electronic table games.

== History ==
The Mark Twain Casino opened July 21, 2005 and was first operated by Grace Entertainment. Mark Twain Casino and RV Park was one of three Midwest casinos acquired from Grace Entertainment in 2005 for $287 million. The other casinos were St. Jo Frontier Casino in St. Joseph, Missouri and Lakeside Hotel and Casino in Osceola, Iowa. When Herbst Gaming took over, the casino's name was changed to Terrible's Mark Twain Casino. In May 2011, Herbst Gaming changed its name to Affinity Gaming, and the casino's name reverted to its original name, dropping "Terrible's". Michael Silberling was named CEO of Affinity Gaming in August 2014.
