= Key Largo (hotel and casino) =

Historic demolished hotel and casino in Nevada, United States

- Location within Las Vegas Strip Location within Nevada
- Interactive map of Key Largo
- Location: Paradise, Nevada; 377 East Flamingo Road; 36.113494°N 115.1556344°W
- Opened: 1974
- Closed: January 18, 2005; 21 years ago
- Theme: South Florida
- No. of rooms: 314
- Gaming space: 9,100 sq ft (850 m^{2})
- Casino type: Land-based
- Previous names: Ambassador Inn (1974–1989); Ambassador Casino (1978–1986); La Mirage Casino (1986–1988); Quality Inn/Anthony's Casino (1988–1993); Quality Inn & Casino (1993–1997)
- Renovated in: 1978; 1982; 1997

Key Largo (also known as Quality Inn Key Largo Casino) was a hotel and casino located on 4.85 acres (1.96 ha) of land at 377 East Flamingo Road, one mile east of the Las Vegas Strip, in Paradise, Nevada.

The property began in 1974, as the Ambassador Inn hotel. A casino was added in 1978. The property underwent numerous name changes up to 1997, when it was reopened as the Key Largo. The property closed in 2005, to make way for a new high-rise project that failed to materialize. After years of sitting vacant, Key Largo was partially destroyed in a 2013 fire and was subsequently demolished.

== History ==
=== Years of operation (1974–2005) ===
The property was built and opened in 1974, as the Ambassador Inn, part of a hotel chain. A casino called Ambassador Casino opened on the property in 1978, while the hotel retained the Ambassador Inn name. In 1981, the Ambassador Inn was sold to new owners, and received a $1 million renovation a year later.

In June 1982, the Ambassador Casino filed for Chapter 11 bankruptcy. The hotel was unaffected, as it was owned by a separate company. The Ambassador Casino closed at 6:00 a.m. on September 7, 1982, because of financial problems caused by a lack of tourism and a poor local economy. At that time, the casino had 80 employees, six blackjack tables, one craps table, and 140 slot machines. The 315-room hotel, bar and restaurant were also closed, but were expected to reopen in a couple of days.

The casino was reopened, by Nicholas Robone and his family, as the La Mirage Casino in January 1986. The family had been approved for a two-month gaming license, giving state regulators enough time to investigate an anonymous tip that Nicholas Robone had skimmed money while previously working at the Continental hotel-casino across the street. The skimming charges were not proven. In March 1986, the Robone family was approved by Nevada for a 12-month limited gaming license. Nicholas Robone and his wife Mary held 47.5 percent of the casino, while their son, Anthony Robone, held five percent and was the casino's manager.

In 1987, Allen Rosoff sued La Mirage for trademark infringement. Rosoff was the owner of the Mirage Motel, which he had been operating at the south end of the Las Vegas Strip since 1953, and claimed that La Mirage's name was causing confusion among his prospective customers. Rosoff won a permanent injunction against La Mirage. However, La Mirage was granted a stay of proceedings until it could appeal the case to the Nevada Supreme Court. In 1988, as La Mirage was appealing the case, businessman Steve Wynn purchased the Mirage name from both businesses to avoid confusion with his upcoming Mirage resort, which opened on the Las Vegas Strip a year later. Both businesses received $250,000 to stop using the name as of July 1, 1988. That year, the Ambassador Inn hotel became a Quality Inn, while the casino was renamed Anthony's Casino. In 1993, the name changed to Quality Inn & Casino.

During 1997, the property was given a $7 million renovation and a south Florida theme. The hotel-casino reopened as the Key Largo on August 29, 1997, with three table games, 248 slot machines, 150 employees, and 320 rooms. The hotel remained a part of the Quality Inn chain. If successful, there were plans to expand the casino and add a hotel tower, both on vacant land directly west of Key Largo. A sportsbook opened at the casino in 1999. Key Largo's low prices appealed to tourists and local residents, as the property was known for its $1.99 hamburgers and cheap hotel accommodation.

In October 2004, plans were approved for two high-rise towers to be constructed on the property: a 70-foot hotel tower with 344 rooms, to replace the existing hotel and its 314 rooms; and a 196-foot condominium tower with 905 units. It was not clear if the casino would be demolished or integrated into the proposed project.

=== Closure (2005–2013) ===
Key Largo closed on the night of January 18, 2005, although many operations at the property had ceased earlier in the day. Approximately 200 people worked at the hotel-casino, which featured 245 slot machines, four blackjack tables, and a roulette wheel. The casino's sportsbook was closed a week earlier, on January 12, 2005. Anthony Curtis of the Las Vegas Advisor opined that Key Largo would not be missed significantly, stating that while it had loyal customers, it was not nearly as popular as its nearby competitors, Ellis Island and Terrible's Hotel and Casino.

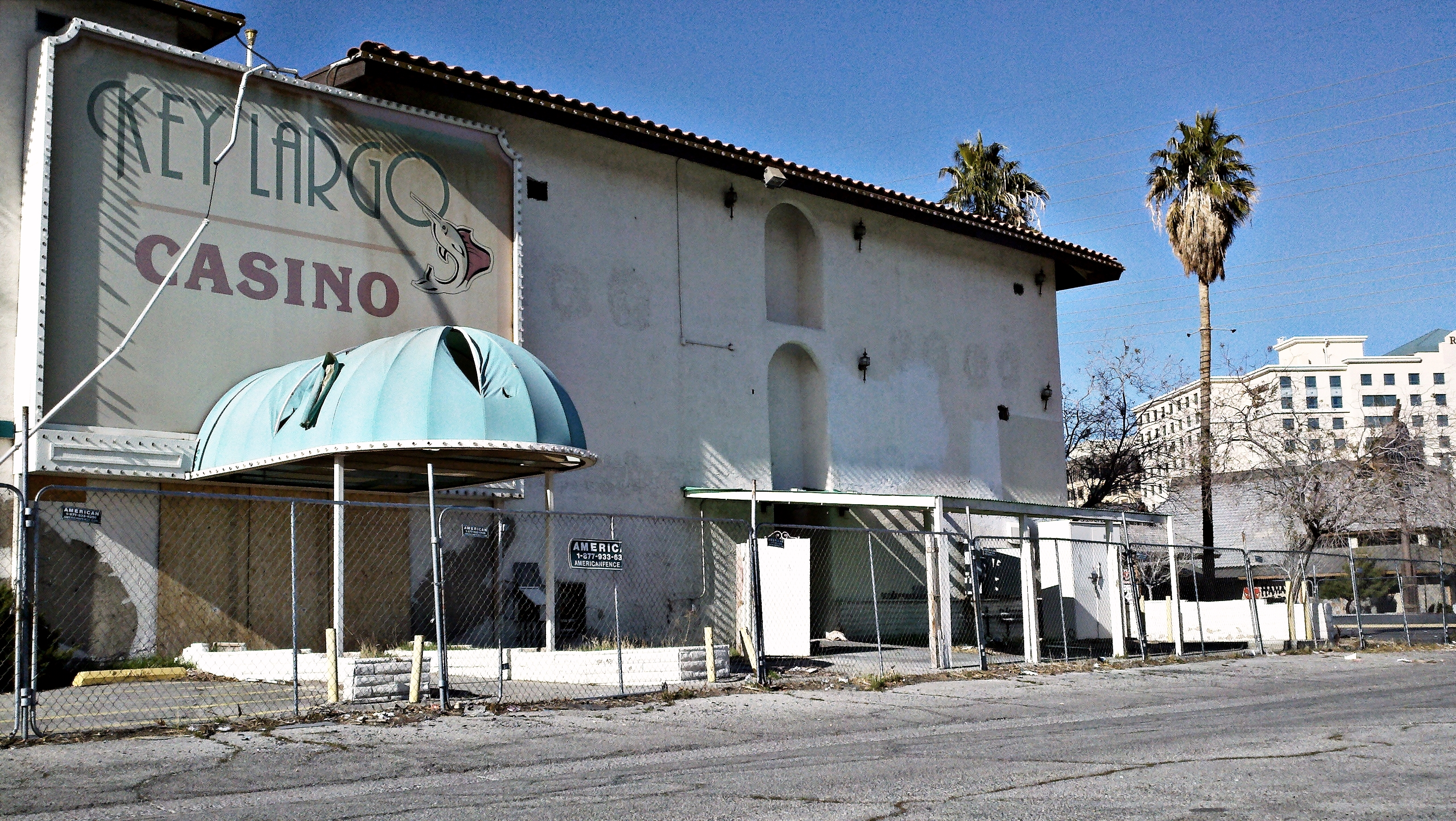
Key Largo during its closure, January 2011

In June 2005, the Clark County Commission approved design plans for the new resort and condominium project, allowing for the demolition of Key Largo. The project would include a 20,000 sq ft (1,900 m^{2}) casino and three towers, with its tallest building standing 41 stories high. The new project failed to materialize, and Key Largo was left to deteriorate.

By June 2007, the casino's gaming license had expired. Because of new laws, the property would need to add at least 200 hotel rooms, a 24-hour restaurant, and 2,000 sq ft (190 m^{2}) of public space to qualify for a new license. The property was ultimately put up for sale at a price of $79 million. The price was later lowered to $48 million. On the night of May 12, 2008, a man started a fire at the abandoned hotel-casino while attempting to steal copper wiring. The man was unaware that the power was still active and suffered burns on over 80 percent of his body.

=== Fire and demolition (2013) ===
On the afternoon of March 28, 2013, a fire broke out at the closed hotel-casino. The fire was reported around 3:05 p.m. Because of the fire, East Flamingo Road was closed between Koval Lane and Paradise Road for several hours by the Las Vegas Metropolitan Police Department. A total of 117 firefighters worked to contain the fire, which caused approximately $4.5 million in damage. Fire crews stayed on the property late into the night to contain the fire.

Fire investigators worked with agents from the Bureau of Alcohol, Tobacco, Firearms and Explosives (ATF) to determine the cause of the fire. An initial investigation revealed that two fires originated separately at the south and north ends of the property. Severe damage, such as a collapsed roof on the property's northern side (formerly the casino floor), slowed down the investigation. Clark County Building Official Ron Lynn, who believed that the hotel-casino was damaged beyond repair, said there were indications that people had sought shelter inside the abandoned building. During its closure, Key Largo had a history of squatters.

On March 29, 2013, Clark County ordered the property's owners to demolish Key Largo's remaining structures by April 26, 2013. The owners were also ordered to stabilize or demolish the casino's northern wall by April 19, 2013. Asbestos located inside the building would need to be removed before large-scale demolition work could take place. On March 31, 2013, a search for human remains among the fire-damaged debris concluded with no bodies found. However, multiple squatters were found during the search, which was conducted with cadaver dogs.

On April 4, 2013, ATF released a report suggesting that arson was the cause of the fire. Officials offered a $5,000 reward for information that would lead to the arrest and conviction of the responsible party. On April 26, 2013, the property's owners filed demolition plans with the county, and were granted a four-month extension to demolish the hotel-casino. A Clark County spokeswoman said, "It's a pretty complex project because there's asbestos involved. They have to abate the asbestos and then tear down the building. Given the condition of the building, it's hard to get in there, so it's going to take some time." Demolition was underway as of June 2013. Additional demolition work was approved in October 2013.
