= Greater Cleveland Aquarium =

Aquarium in Cleveland, Ohio, US

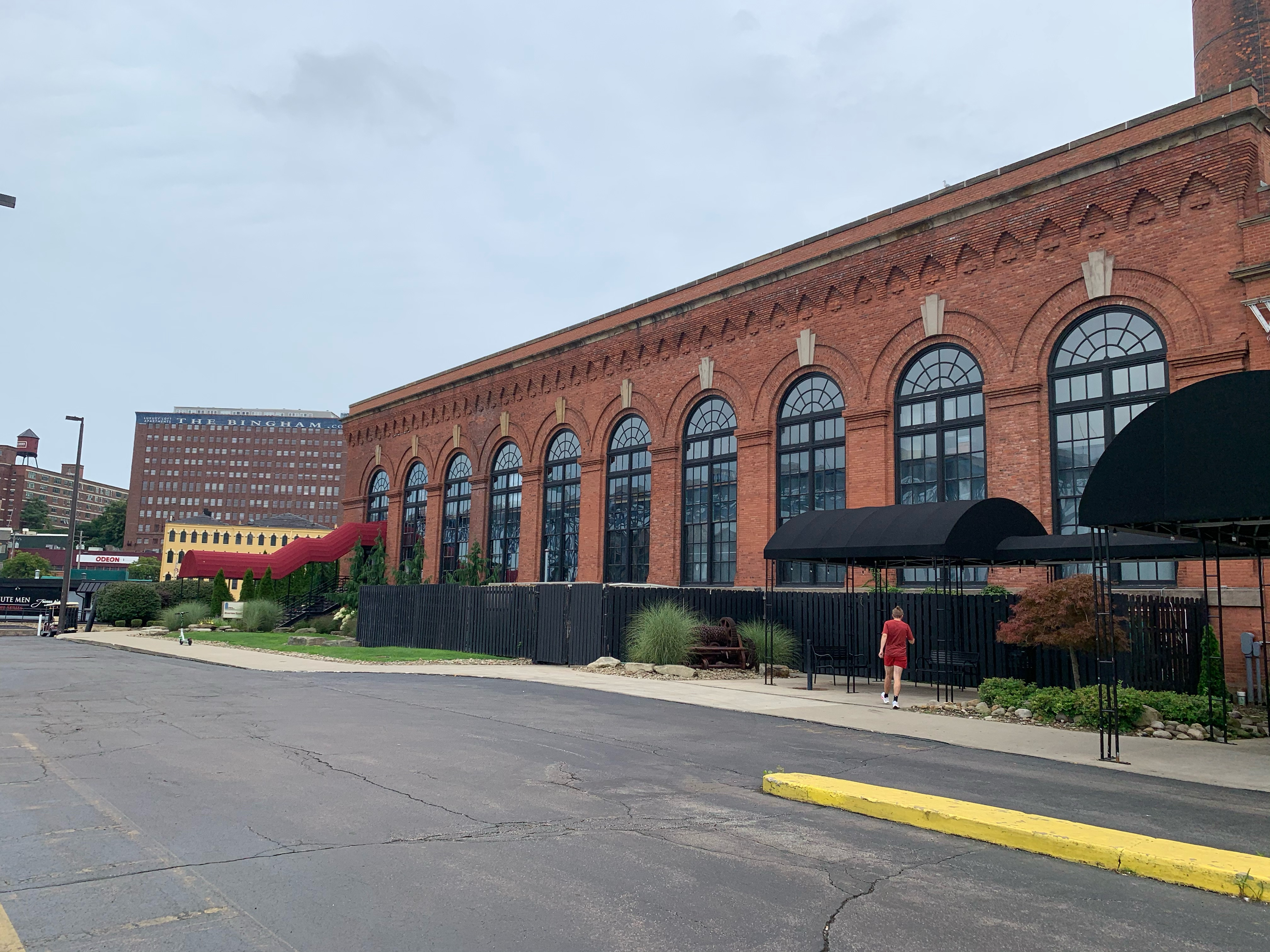
- Greater Cleveland Aquarium exterior
- Interactive map of Greater Cleveland Aquarium
- 41.4963°N 81.7039°W
- Date opened: January 21, 2012
- Location: 2000 Sycamore Street Cleveland, Ohio 44113 U.S.
- Website: greaterclevelandaquarium.com

The Greater Cleveland Aquarium is an aquarium in Cleveland, Ohio. Occupying the historic FirstEnergy Powerhouse building located on the west bank of the Cuyahoga River in the city's Flats district, the aquarium, which opened in January 2012, consists of approximately 70,000 square feet (6,500 m^{2}) of exhibition space and features 55 exhibits over 9 thematic concentrations representing both local and exotic species of fish. The facility is the only independent, free-standing aquarium in the state of Ohio and ended a 26-year period that the city lacked a public aquarium.

== Previous aquarium ==
The Cleveland Aquarium opened in 1954 and was located on the city's near-east side in Gordon Park. The aquarium had 50 freshwater and marine exhibits including sharks, sawfish, seahorses, eels, squid, octopus, and coral. Structural problems with the building forced the closing of the aquarium to the public in 1985; the fish and exhibits were moved to the Cleveland Metroparks Zoo.

== Opening ==
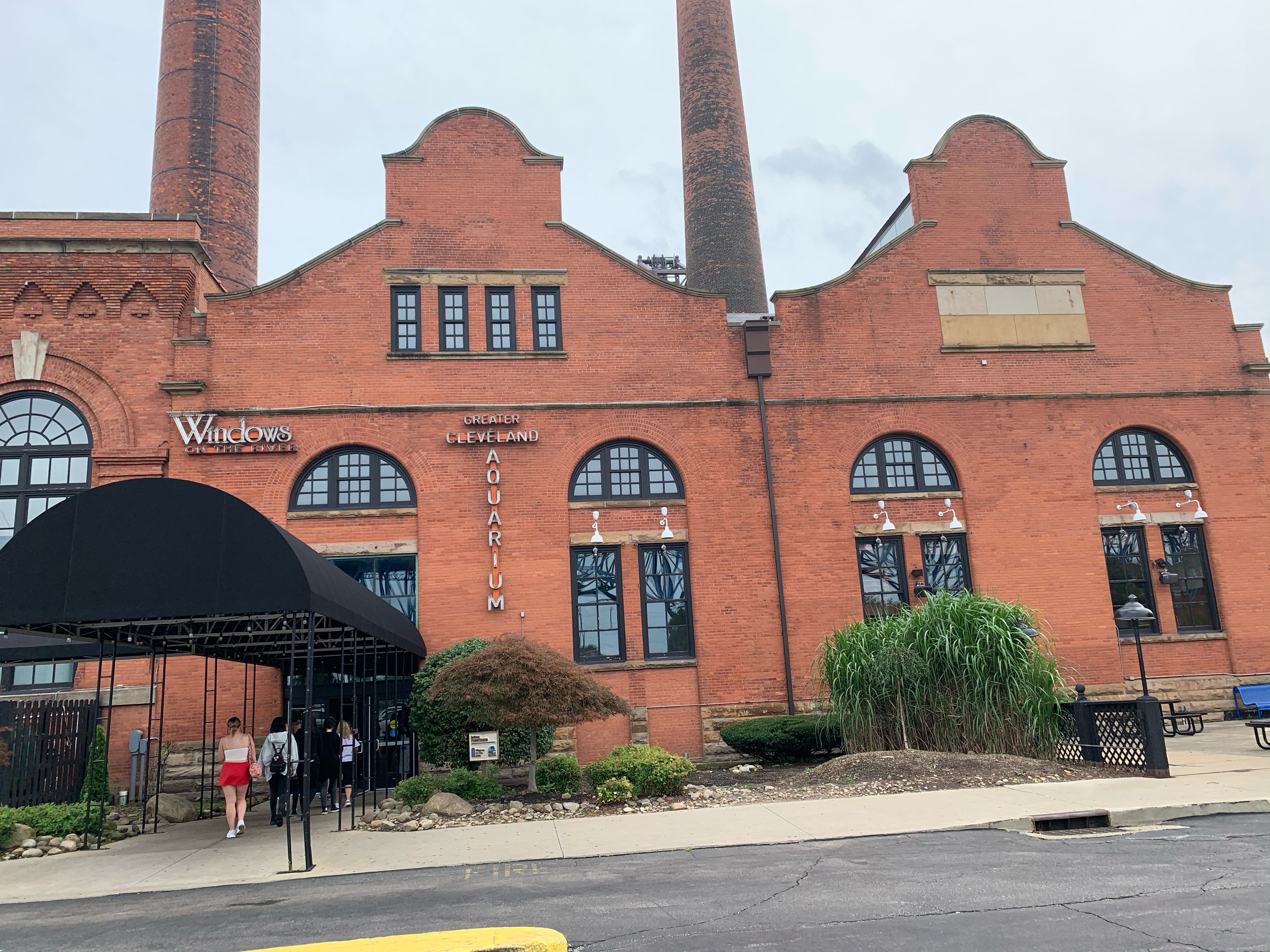
Old FirstEnergy Powerhouse exterior

A new aquarium was conceived in 2009. It was originally envisioned as a more ambitious 100,000–125,000 square feet (9,300–11,600 m^{2}) facility that would cost more than $50 million. However, planning of various forms occurred since the defunct Cleveland Aquarium closed in 1985. Although there were competing interests, the driving force behind the project was Jeffrey P. Jacobs, a local developer who envisioned it as being part of the Powerhouse, a complex he owned.

The eventual facility was a collaboration. It was financed by a $2 million loan from the City of Cleveland, a $1.25 million investment from Marinescape, and an $11.75 million investment from the Nautica Phase 2 Limited Partnership, an affiliate of Jacobs Entertainment, Inc. The facility also supported by FirstEnergy and AMPCO, the parking lot operator for the Nautica Complex.

A ribbon-cutting ceremony was held for the aquarium January 19, 2012, with the aquarium opening to the general public on January 21.

Jacobs Entertainment, Inc. purchased the aquarium outright in 2014.

== Facility ==
The total cost of the facility was roughly $33 million: $18 million for the building and its related infrastructure and $15 million for aquarium exhibits.

At the January 2012 opening, the aquarium 8 exhibition areas, including Ohio Lakes & Rivers, Lakes & Rivers of the World, Discovery Zone, Indo-Pacific, Northern Pacific, Coastal, Coral Reef and a main Shark SeaTube. It features a 230,000-US-gallon (870,000 L) tank with a 175-foot (53 m) acrylic shark tunnel offering panoramic views of marine life, including sharks of various species.

In 2018, the Greater Cleveland Aquarium announced plans to upgrade much of its public space using internal resources and many upcycled materials. In addition to upgrading animal life support systems, the Aquarium enhanced gallery theming, welcomed more than a dozen new species including weedy seadragons and splitfin flashlight fish, and expanded its annual passholder program. Approximately 75% of the Aquarium's public spaces were part of the capital project. In the transformation, the Aquarium divided Lakes & Rivers of the World into two galleries—Asia & Indonesia Gallery and Tropical Forest Gallery; created an Industry & Habitat Gallery to highlight the positive (biomimicry) and negative (habitat loss, pollution) intersections of nature and industry; added relevant conservation action opportunities in each gallery; created Imagiquarium, a toddler-friendly pretend-and-playspace; and expanded its Invasive Species Hut. The galleries were renamed: Ohio Lakes & Rivers, Asia & Indonesia, Tropical Forest, Industry & Habitat, Giant Pacific Octopus, Coastal Boardwalk, Tropical Reef, Shark Gallery & SeaTube. (Imagiquarium space has been discontinued. It is now used for education, field trip tours and weekend birthday parties.)

In 2022, the Aquarium welcomed its two millionth general admission walk-in guest and celebrated the rare births of weedy sea dragons, something only a handful of aquariums around the world have witnessed.

== Experiences ==
In addition to a calendar of special events including Hauntaquarium, Fin Fest and Scuba Claus, the Greater Cleveland Aquarium offers daily interactive experiences including aquarist talks, animal encounters, SCUBA diver underwater talks and exhibit feedings. The aquarium also offers SCUBA-certified divers the opportunity to dive in its Shark Gallery through its Shark Dive CLE program.

== Conservation activities ==
In 2012, Greater Cleveland Aquarium's general manager Tami Brown established a non-profit Splash Fund “to educate and encourage passion about aquatic life and participation in the conservation of fresh and saltwater habitats through sustainable human practices.” In 2019, Splash Fund Board Members include new general manager Stephanie White, Deborah Altman, Bruce Akers, Richard Dorman, Scot Rourke and Trevor Gile. Monies raised by this nonprofit fund have been used to conduct regular community Adopt-A-Beach cleanups at Edgewater Park, provide schools with demonstrated need access to life science-based educational programs and works to encourage a more robust Northeast Ohio spotted turtle population. The Splash Fund is one of more than a dozen partners dedicated to the Saving and Protecting Ohio Turtle Diversity (SPOTD) program working to boost the native but threatened spotted and Blanding's turtle populations in Northeast Ohio.

== Gallery ==
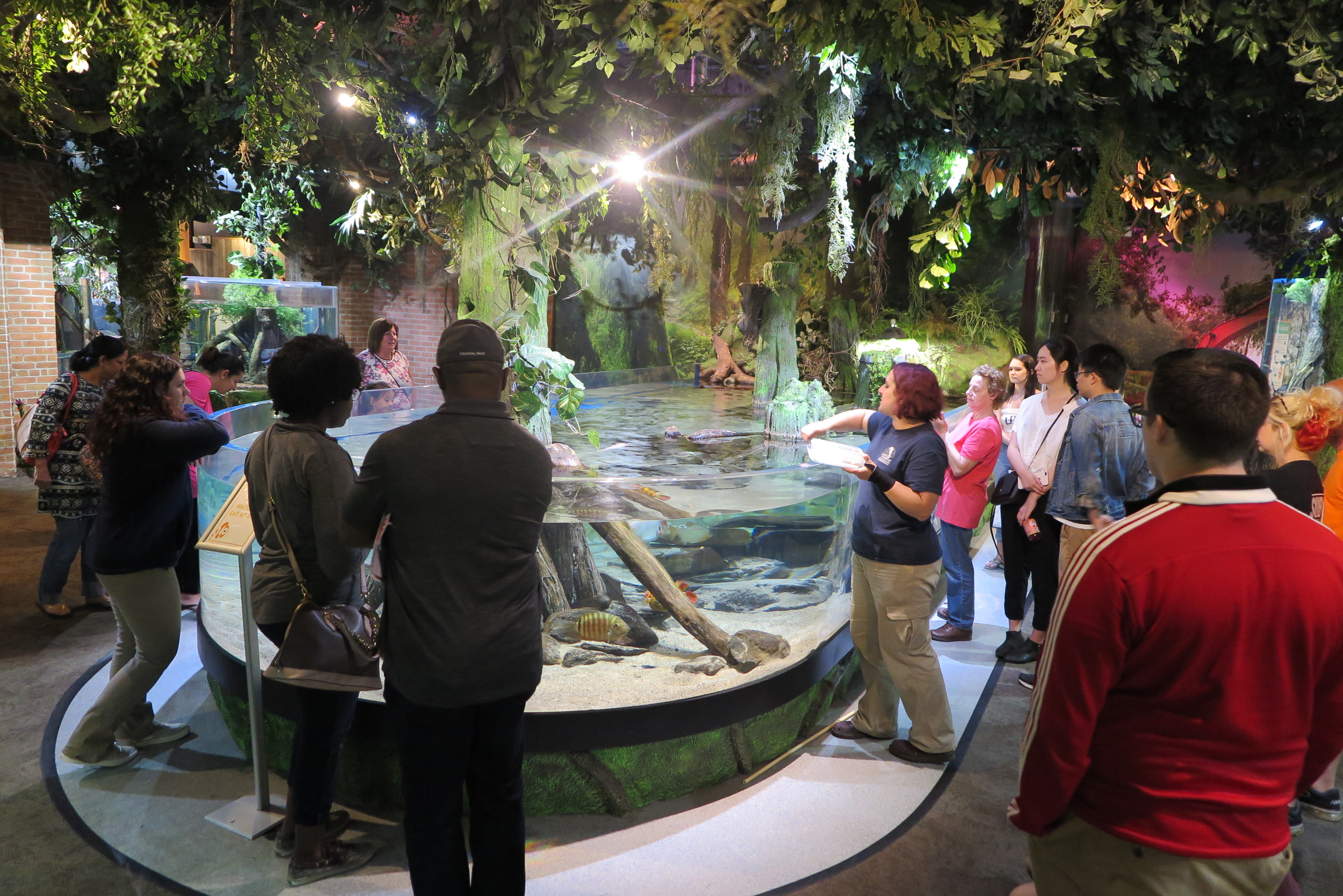

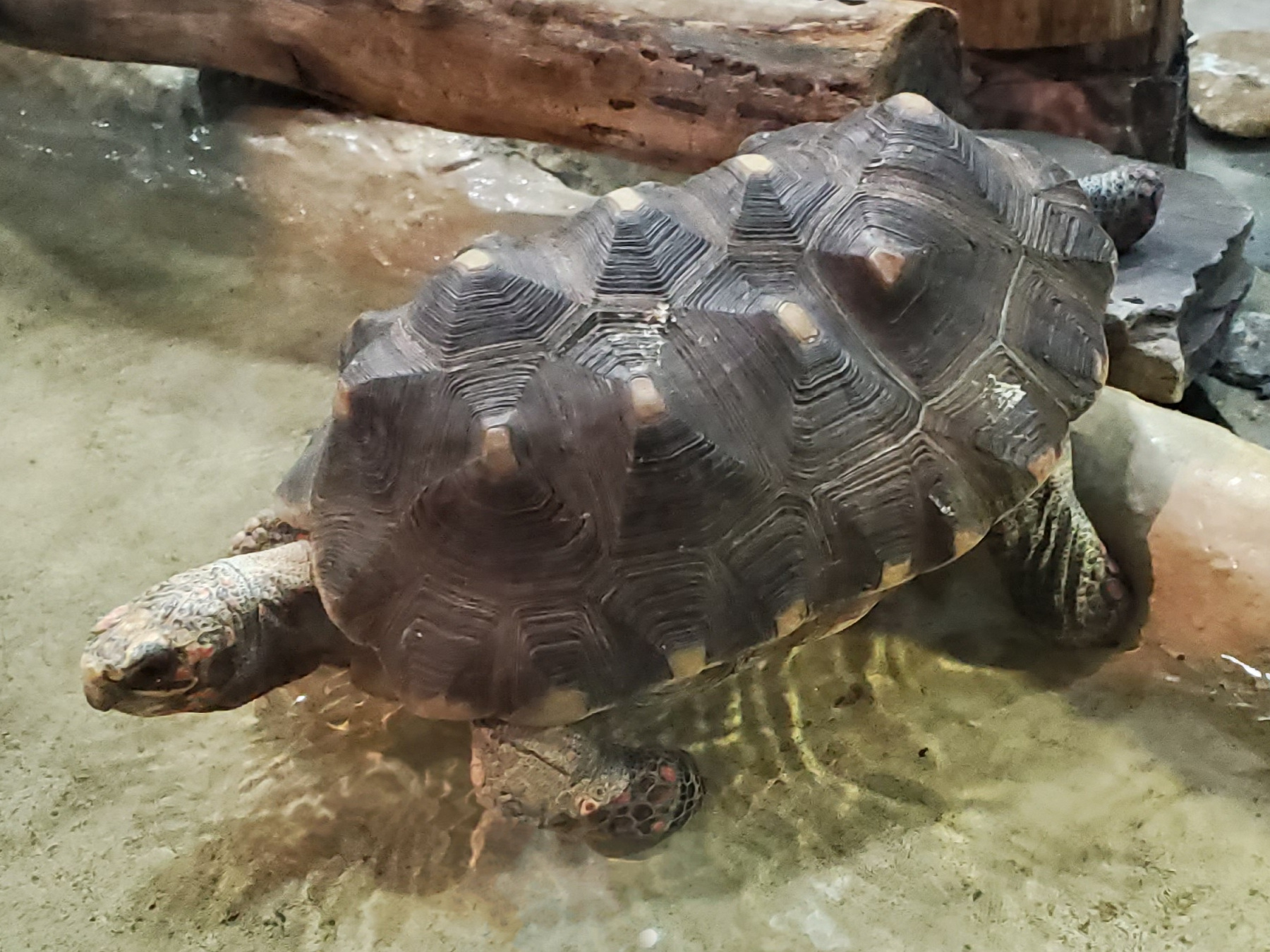

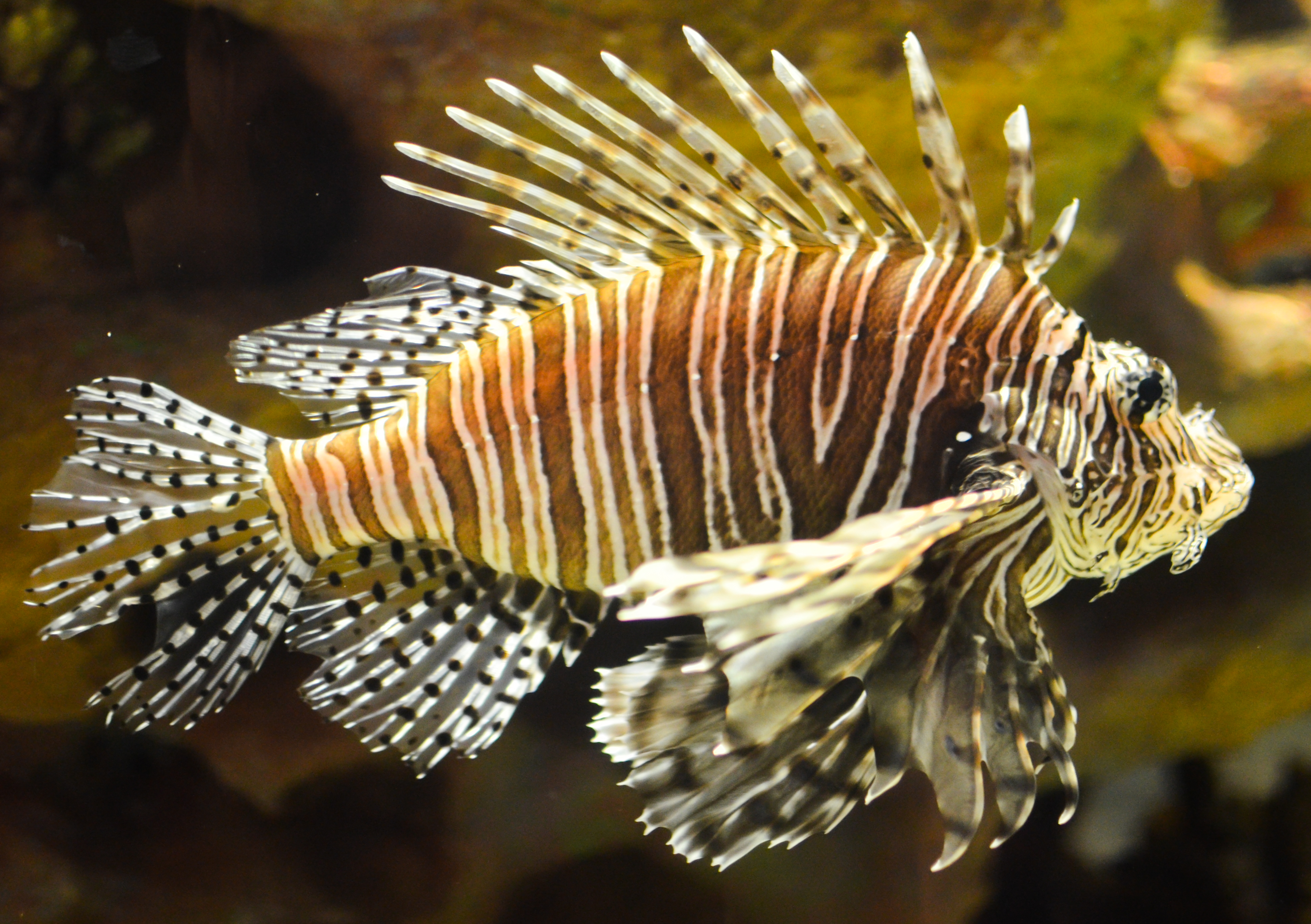

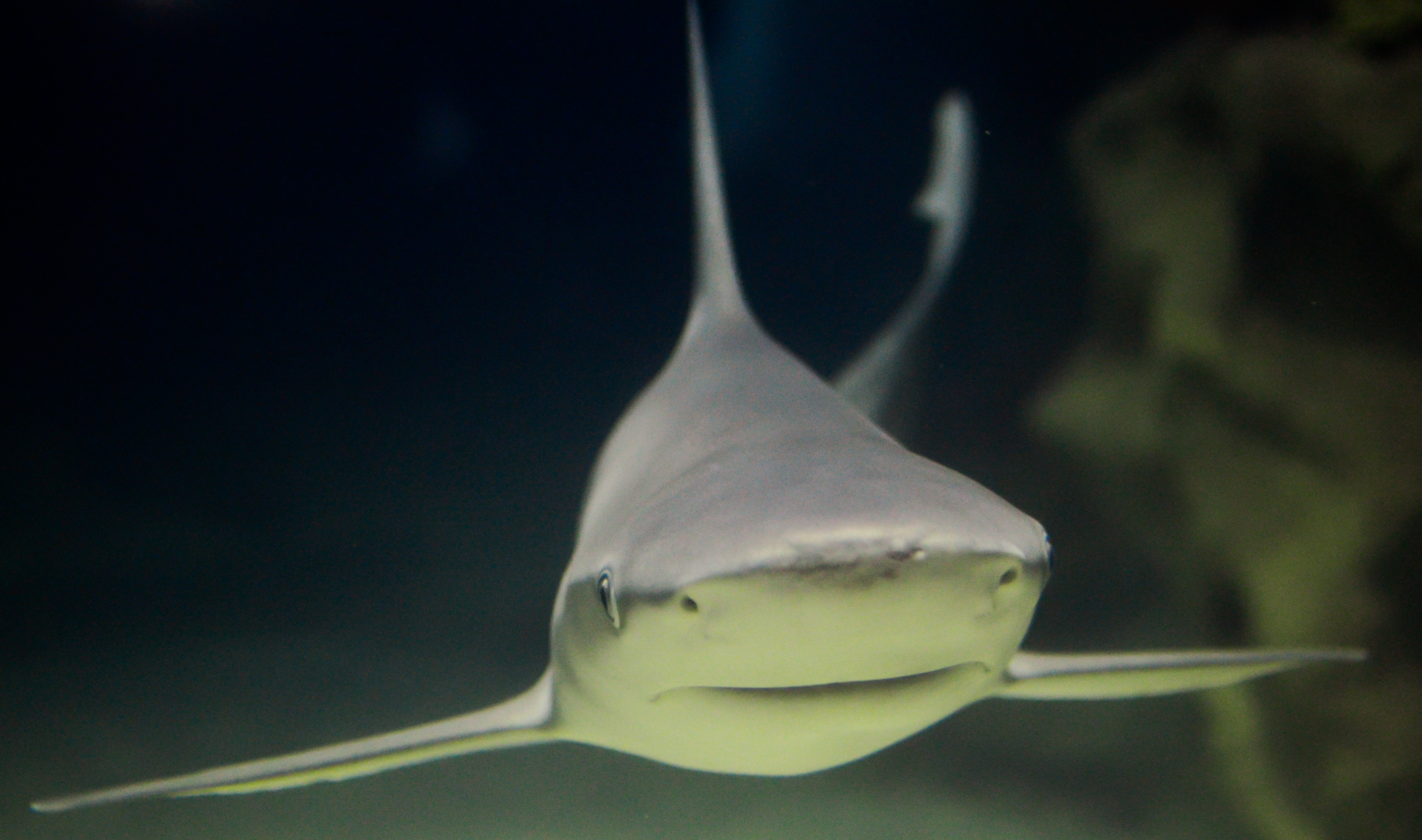

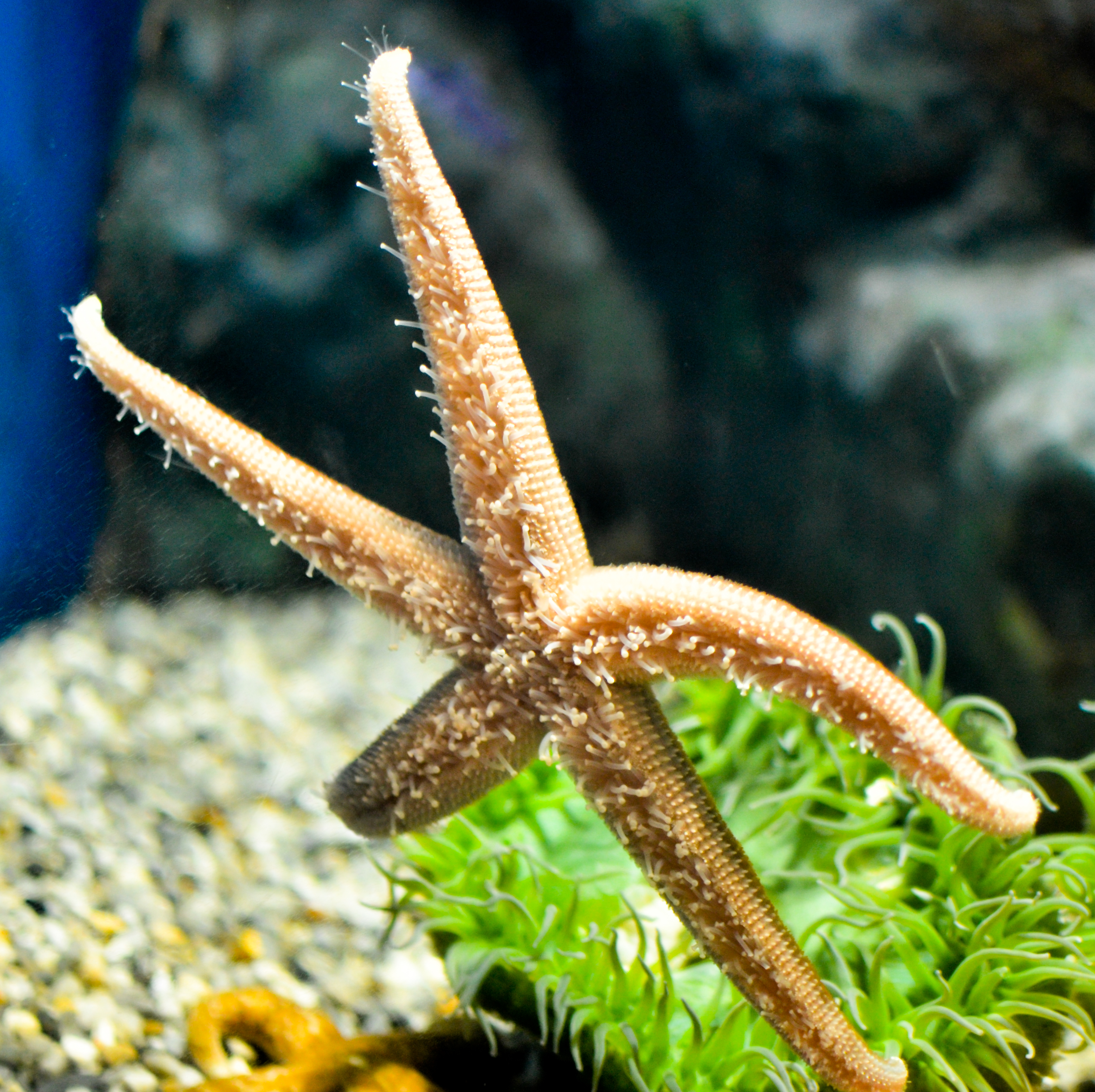

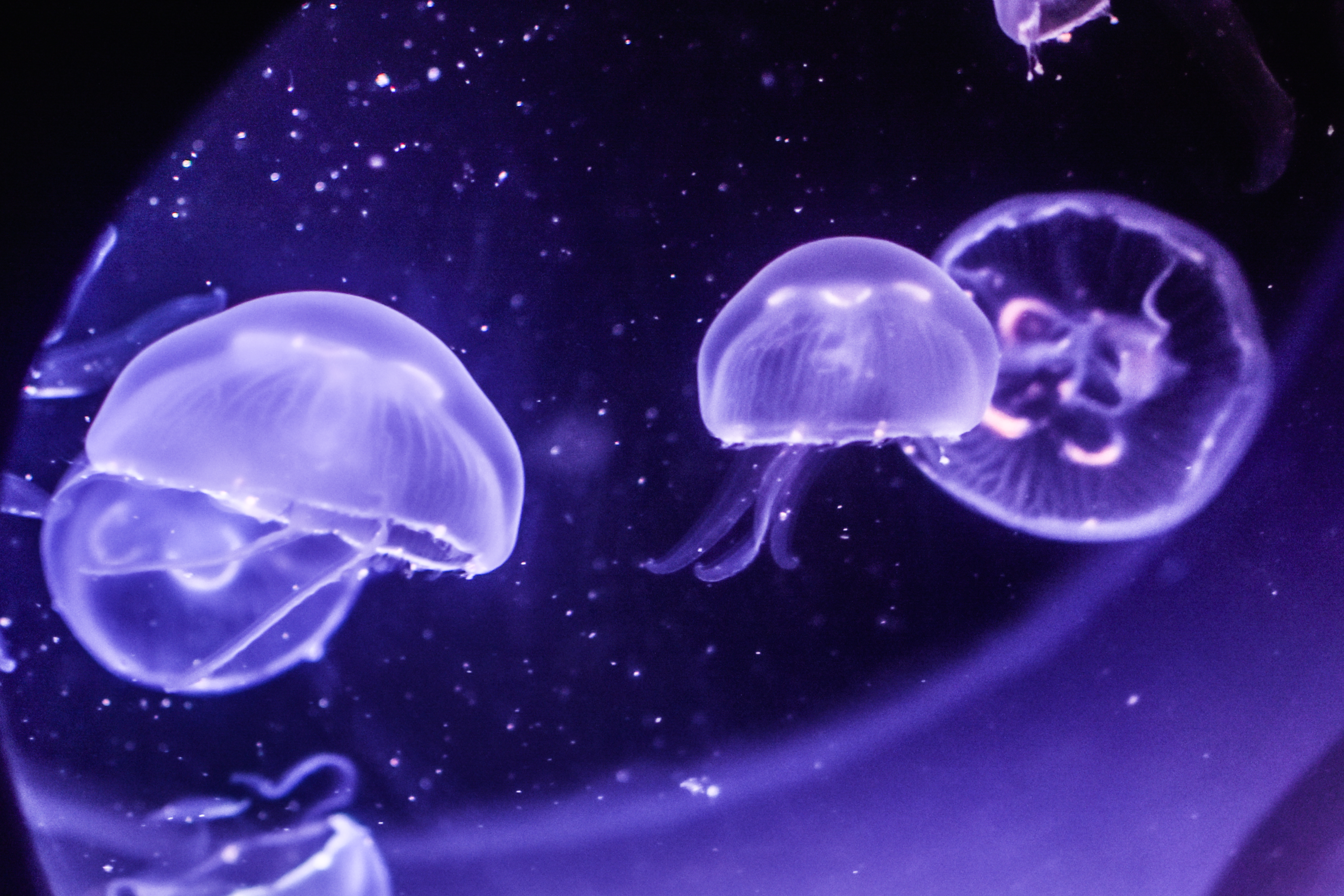

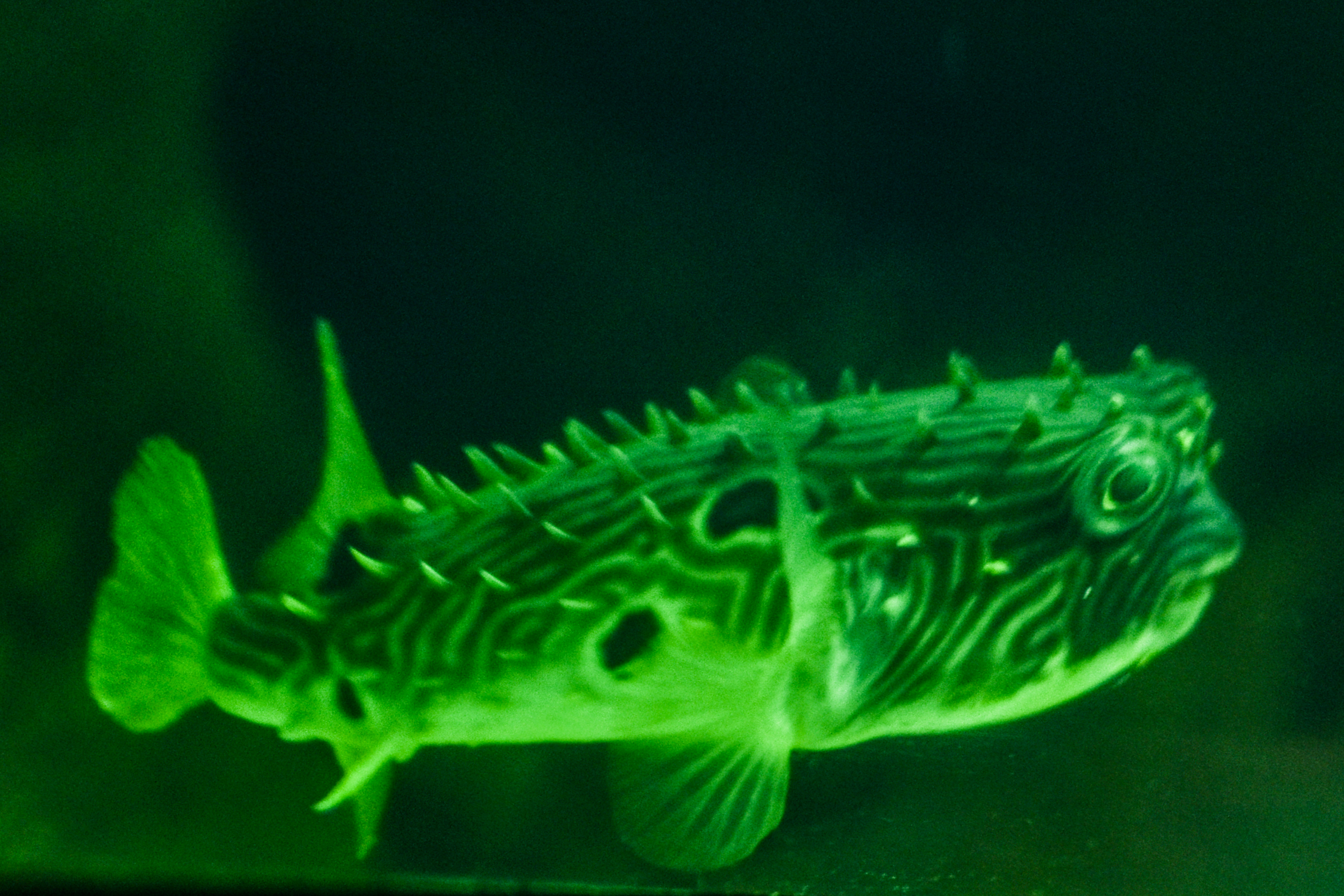

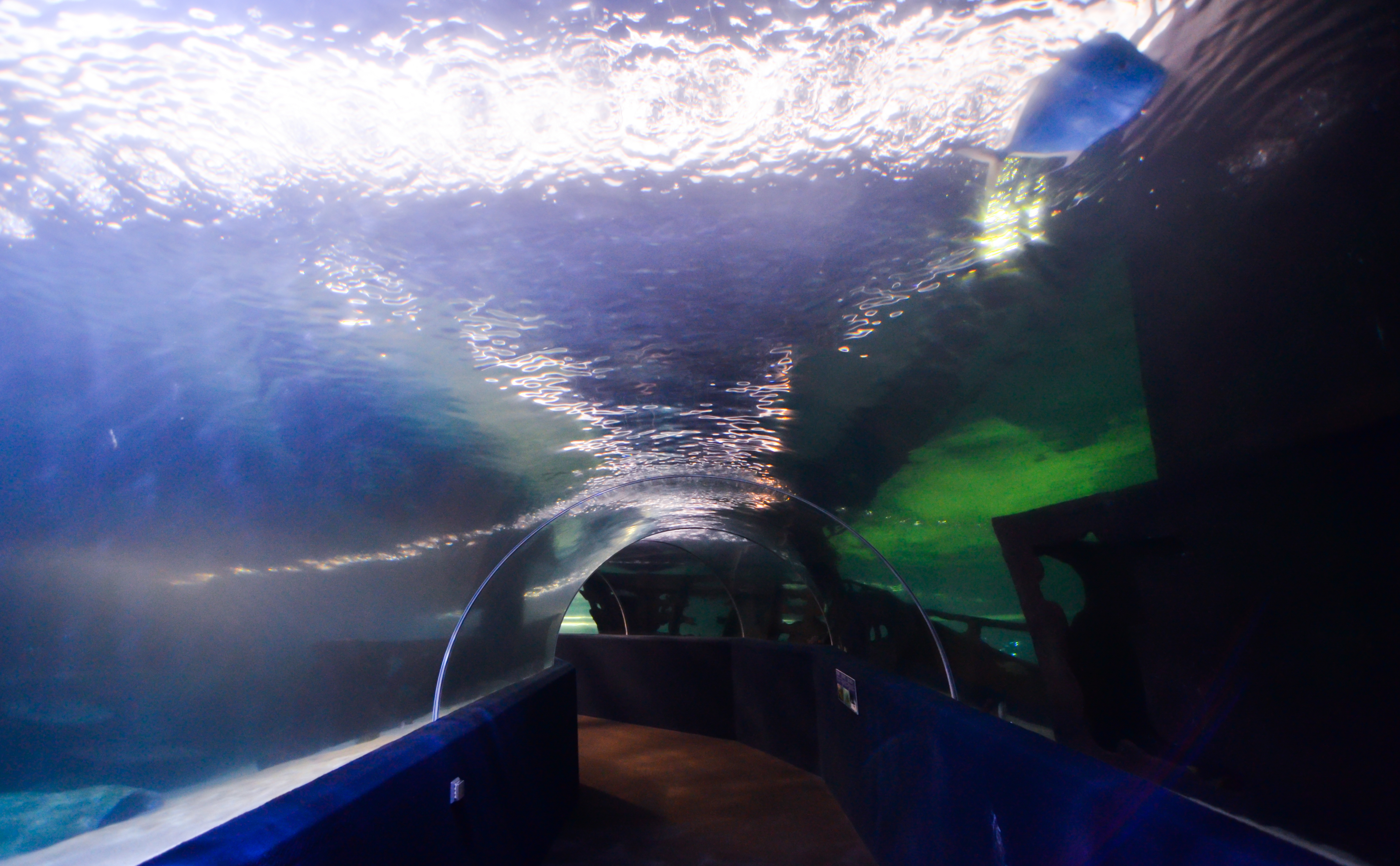

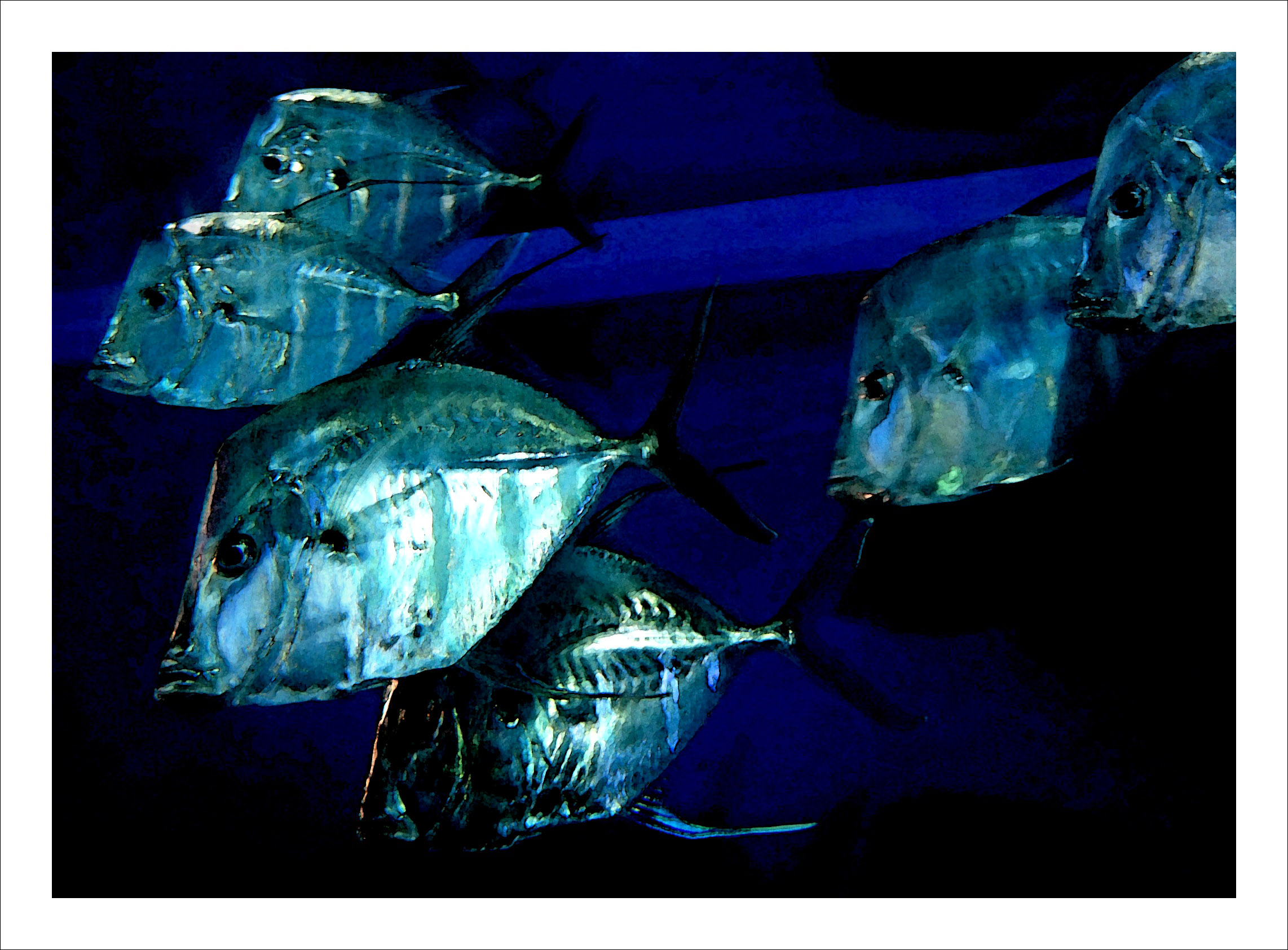

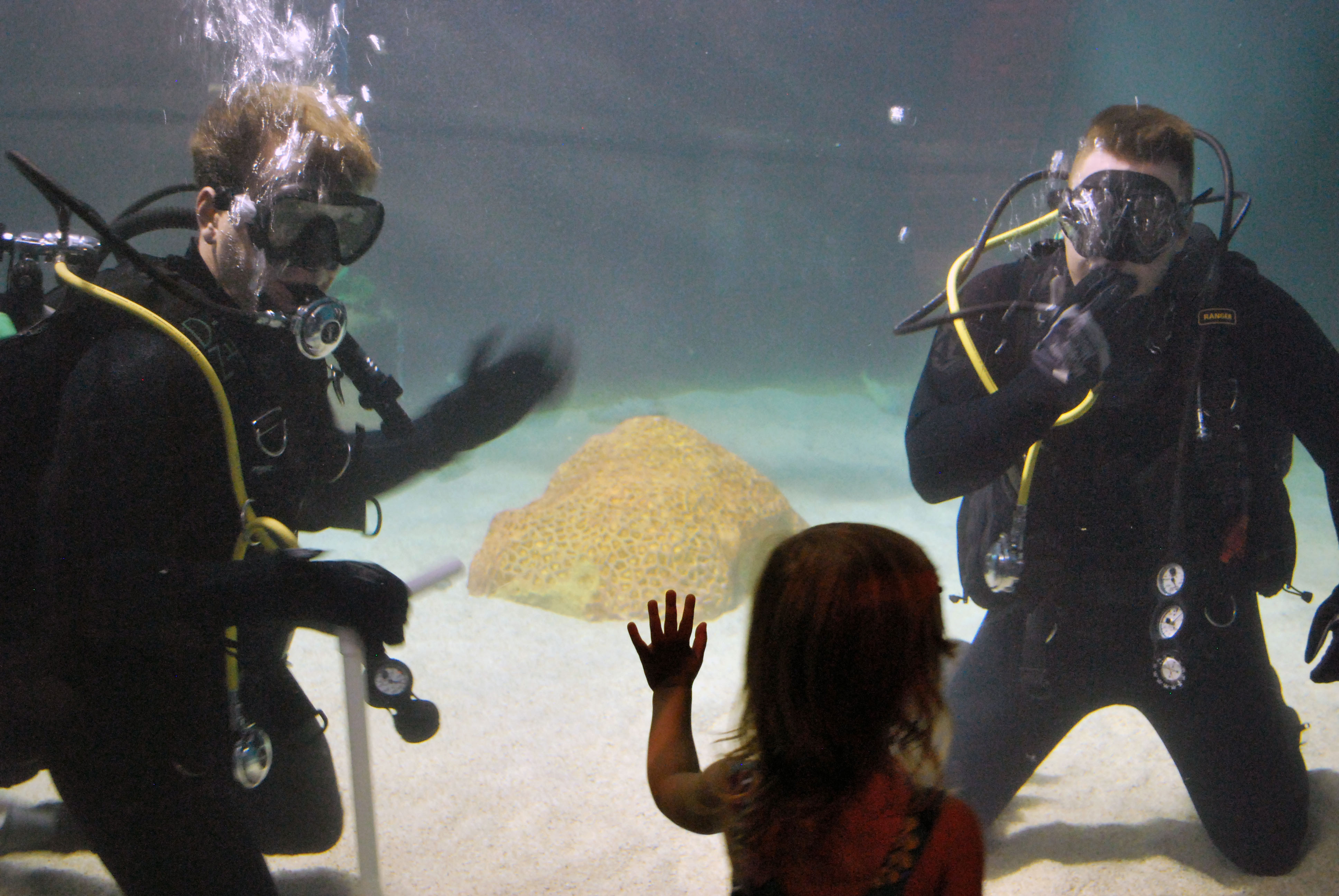
