= 1986 Ohio State Treasurer election =

- November 4, 1986
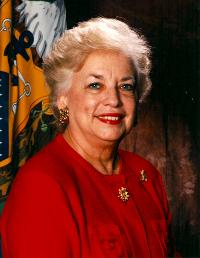

Nominee	Mary Ellen Withrow	Jeff Jacobs
Party	Democratic	Republican
Popular vote	1,648,569	1,352,611
Percentage	54.93%	45.07%
- County results Withrow: 50–60% 60–70% 70–80% Jacobs: 50–60% 60–70%
Ohio State Treasurer before election
Mary Ellen Withrow
Democratic
Elected Ohio State Treasurer
Mary Ellen Withrow
Democratic

The 1986 Ohio State Treasurer election was held on November 4, 1986, to elect the Ohio State Treasurer. Primaries were held on May 6, 1986. Democratic incumbent Ohio State Treasurer Mary Ellen Withrow won re-election, defeating Republican Ohio State House Representative Jeff Jacobs by a comfortable margin of nine percentage points.

== Democratic primary ==
=== Candidates ===
- Mary Ellen Withrow, incumbent Ohio State Treasurer (1983–1994)
- Bryan E. Icard

=== Campaign ===
Withrow easily won renomination, defeating her primary challenger Bryan E. Icard by over 60 percentage points.

=== Results ===
Democratic primary results
Party	Candidate	Votes	%
Democratic	Mary Ellen Withrow	536,964	82.62%
Democratic	Bryan E. Icard	112,947	17.38%
Total votes		649,911	100.00%

== Republican primary ==
=== Candidates ===
- Jeff Jacobs, Ohio State House Representative (1983–1986)

=== Campaign ===
Jacobs won the Republican nomination unopposed.

=== Results ===
Republican primary results
Party	Candidate	Votes	%
Republican	Jeff Jacobs	503,355	100.00%
Total votes		503,355	100.00%

== General election ==
=== Candidates ===
- Mary Ellen Withrow, incumbent Ohio State Treasurer (1983–1994) (Democratic)
- Jeff Jacobs, Ohio State House Representative (1983–1986) (Republican)

=== Results ===
1986 Ohio State Treasurer election results
Party	Candidate	Votes	%	±%
Democratic	Mary Ellen Withrow	1,648,569	54.93%	+6.88%
Republican	Jeff Jacobs	1,352,611	45.07%	−0.77%
Total votes		3,001,180	100.00%	
Democratic hold				
