= Affinity Interactive =

Private casino and sports betting company

- Formerly: Herbst Gaming (1987–2011); Affinity Gaming (2011–2021)
- Type: Private
- Industry: Gambling
- Founded: 1987
- Headquarters: Paradise, Nevada
- Key people: Scott Butera (CEO)
- Owner: Z Capital Partners
- Website: affinityinteractive.com

Affinity Interactive, formerly known as Herbst Gaming and Affinity Gaming, is an American private casino and sports betting company based in Paradise, Nevada. It operates eight casinos in Nevada, Missouri, and Iowa, and publishes the Daily Racing Form.

== History ==
The old logo of Herbst Gaming

The company traces its roots to 1987, when its predecessor was formed to service the slot machines at the Terrible Herbst gas stations. It was operated by brothers Ed, Tim, and Troy Herbst, whose father, Jerry Herbst, owned the gas stations. Their company later became a slot route operator, maintaining slot machines at other businesses such as taverns and laundromats.

The Herbsts opened their first casino, the Terrible's Town Casino in Pahrump, Nevada, in 1996. This was followed by Terrible's Town Casino and Bowl in Henderson, Nevada; Terrible's Lakeside Casino in Pahrump in 1999; and Terrible's Hotel and Casino (formerly the Continental Hotel and Casino) in 2000 near the Las Vegas Strip.

In 2000, the Herbsts' slot company, E-T-T Inc., doubled its size by acquiring the slot route operation of Jackpot Enterprises for $41 million, bringing it to a total of 6,000 machines under management.

In 2001, the Herbst brothers' gaming interests were reorganized as Herbst Gaming, Inc., in connection with a $170-million bond offering.

The company opened its fifth casino, Terrible's Searchlight Casino in Searchlight, Nevada, in 2002.

In 2003, Herbst became the largest slot route operator in Nevada by acquiring Anchor Coin and its 1,100 machines from International Game Technology for $61 million.

In 2005, Herbst expanded to the Midwest by acquiring three casinos in Missouri and Iowa from W.M. Grace Entertainment for $287 million.

In 2006, a statewide smoking ban was enacted in Nevada at taverns and convenience stores, which was expected to hurt the revenues of slot route operators such as Herbst. In response, the company began to diversify by acquiring more casinos. In January 2007, Herbst purchased Sands Regent, a company with four Northern Nevada casinos, including the Sands Regency and the Rail City Casino, for $119 million. Later that year, it also acquired the Primm Valley Casino Resorts, a group of three casinos at the Nevada–California state line, from MGM Mirage for $400 million.

In early 2008, the company revealed that it was considering a sale or bankruptcy, because of poor financial results stemming from the economic slowdown and the smoking ban. Analysts said that the company was also suffering from having overpaid for the Primm casinos, which faced increasing competition from expanding tribal casinos in Southern California.

Herbst Gaming filed for Chapter 11 bankruptcy protection in March 2009 with a prepackaged plan to hand ownership of the casinos to the company's bank lenders, while the Herbst family would receive a 90 percent stake in the slot route business. After objections from bondholders, the plan was revised to give full ownership of the slot route operation to the creditors, leaving the Herbsts with no role in the business. The company, reorganized as Herbst Gaming LLC, emerged from bankruptcy at the end of 2010, owned by a group of approximately 140 investment companies and banks.

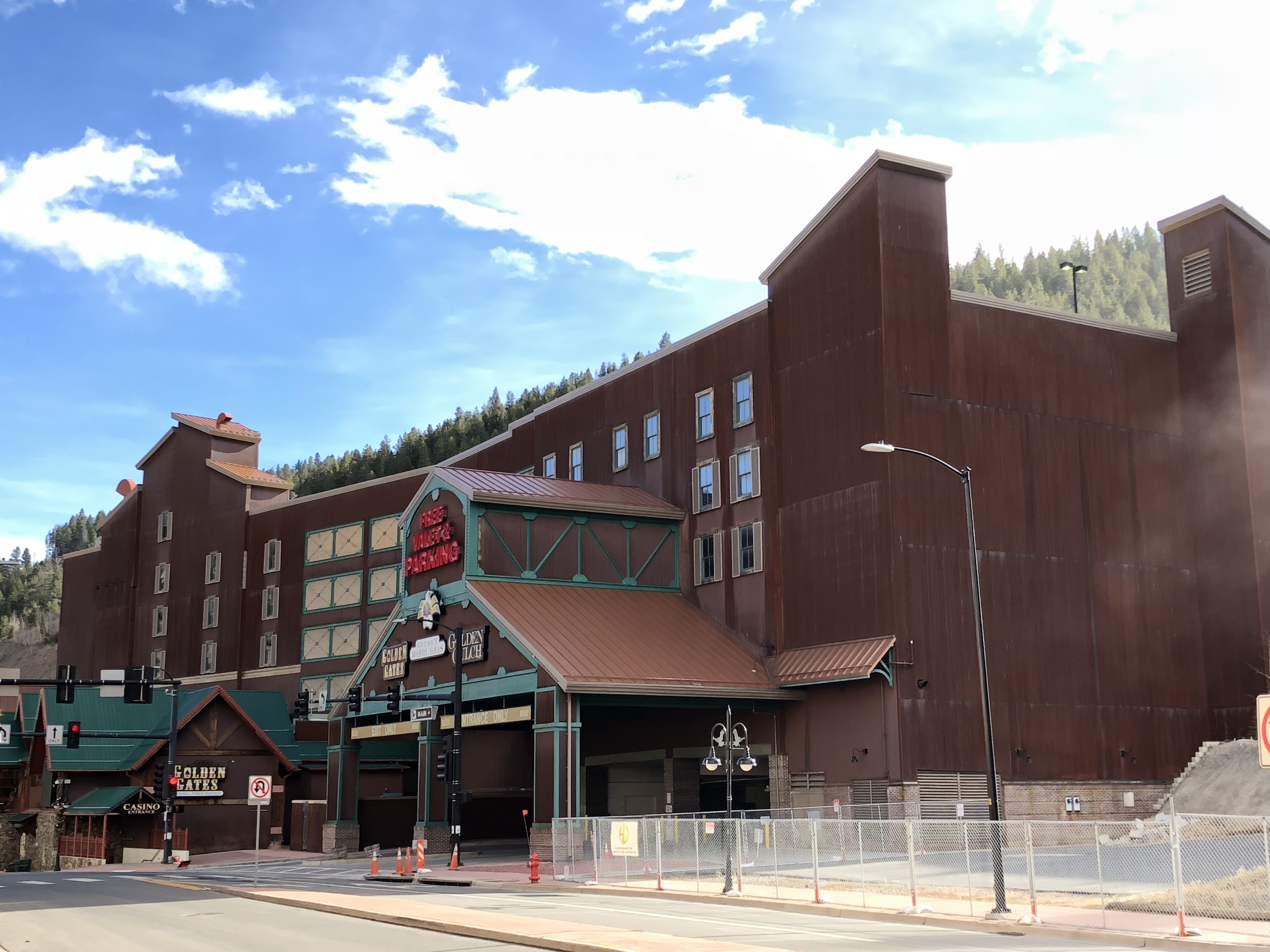
Golden Gates Casino, acquired by Affinity Gaming in 2012

The company changed its name to Affinity Gaming in May 2011, to avoid confusion as the Herbst family planned to rejoin the gaming industry. Some properties continued to use the Terrible's name and logo under license from Terrible Herbst, while others were reverted to their previous names. The last Affinity property bearing the name, Terrible's Hotel and Casino, was rebranded as the Silver Sevens in 2013.

In 2012 and 2013, Affinity sold off several "non-core assets". The slot route was sold to Golden Gaming and JETT Gaming (a new company formed by Jerry Herbst). The two casinos in Pahrump were also sold to Golden Gaming, and the Searchlight casino to JETT. The Sands Regency and two smaller casinos in Northern Nevada were sold for $19.2 million to Truckee Gaming, a new company led by Affinity executive Ferenc Szony. Meanwhile, Affinity expanded to Colorado by buying three casinos in Black Hawk from Golden Gaming.

In February 2017, Z Capital Partners, a private equity firm which had already built up a 41 percent stake in Affinity, bought all outstanding shares in a transaction valuing the company at $580 million.

In October 2018, Z Capital proposed to acquire competing casino operator Full House Resorts and merge it into Affinity, but the offer was rejected by Full House executives.

Affinity sold its three Colorado casinos in January 2020 to Twin River Worldwide Holdings for $51 million.

In March 2020, Affinity established a special-purpose acquisition company, Gaming & Hospitality Acquisition Corp. (GHAC), through which it planned to become a publicly traded company and merge with a to-be-determined company in the gaming industry. GHAC completed an initial public offering in February 2021, raising $200 million. Z Capital later announced that it would merge Affinity with a sister company, Sports Information Group, the parent company of the Daily Racing Form. The combined company would be named Affinity Interactive, and would continue to seek an acquisition target with GHAC. The merger was completed in July 2021. GHAC, however, did not complete a merger, and was liquidated in 2022.

== Gaming operations ==
- Lakeside Hotel & Casino — Osceola, Iowa
- Mark Twain Casino & RV Park — La Grange, Missouri
- St. Jo Frontier Casino — St. Joseph, Missouri
- Silver Sevens Hotel and Casino — Paradise, Nevada

=== Former properties ===
- Gold Ranch Casino & RV Resort — Verdi, Nevada
- Golden Gates Casino — Black Hawk, Colorado (sold in 2020)
- Golden Gulch Casino — Black Hawk, Colorado (sold in 2020)
- Golden Mardi Gras Casino — Black Hawk, Colorado (sold in 2020)
- Henderson Casino Bowl — Henderson, Nevada (closed in 2013)
- Primm Valley Casino Resorts — Primm, Nevada
  - Primm Valley Resort & Casino
  - Buffalo Bill's
  - Whiskey Pete's
- Red Hawk Sports Bar — Dayton, Nevada (closed in 2008)
- Sands Regency — Reno, Nevada
- Terrible's Casino — Dayton, Nevada
- Terrible's Lakeside Casino & RV Park — Pahrump, Nevada
- Terrible's Searchlight Casino — Searchlight, Nevada
- Terrible's Town Casino — Pahrump, Nevada
