= Jacobs Entertainment =

Company in Colorado

Jacobs Entertainment, Inc.
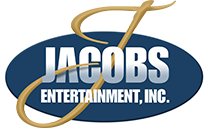
- Industry: Gaming; Entertainment; Hospitality
- Founder: Jeff Jacobs
- Headquarters: Golden, Colorado, U.S.
- Key people: Jeff Jacobs, Chairman & CEO
- Products: Casinos; Hotels; Entertainment; Restaurants
- Website: jacobsentertainmentinc.com

Jacobs Entertainment, Inc. is a gaming, hospitality, and entertainment company based in Golden, Colorado, with properties in Louisiana, Colorado, Nevada, and Ohio.

== History ==
The company was formed by Cleveland real estate developer and former Ohio state representative Jeff Jacobs. In 1995, it announced a joint venture with Black Hawk Gaming & Development to build a casino hotel in Black Hawk, Colorado. Jacobs was also reported to be exploring gaming opportunities in 10 other states, as well as South Africa and Aruba. Later that year, the company purchased 50 percent of Colonial Downs, a horse track under development in New Kent, Virginia, for $5 million, and was negotiating to purchase River Downs, an Ohio horse track.

In 1996, the company made a $9 million investment in the Boardwalk Casino on the Las Vegas Strip.

The Lodge Casino, the company's $73-million joint venture with Black Hawk Gaming, opened in 1998, with Jacobs owning a 25 percent share.

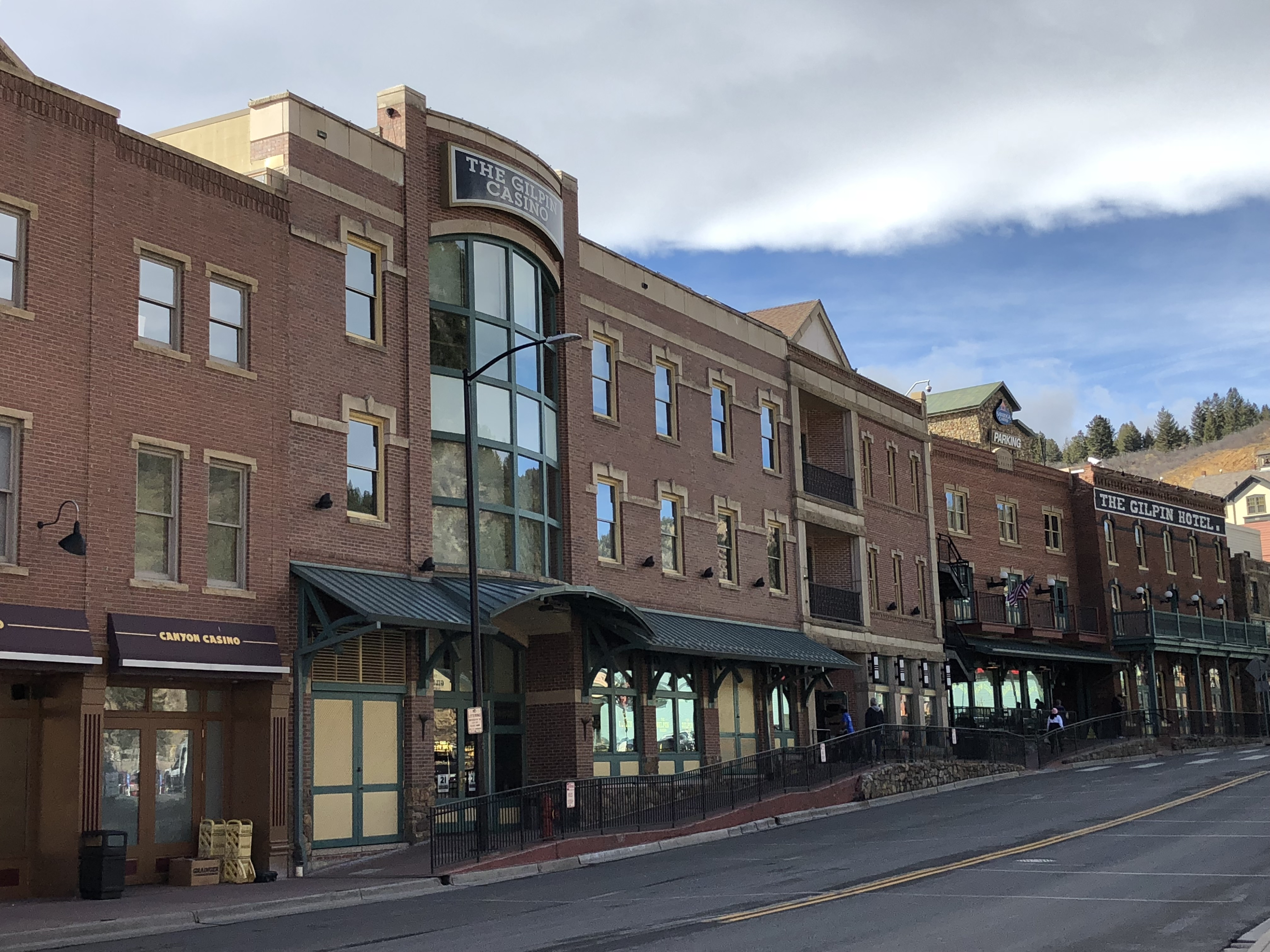
The Gilpin Casino in Black Hawk, Colorado.

In 2002, Jacobs and his father, former Cleveland Indians owner Richard E. Jacobs, consolidated their gaming holdings into a reorganized Jacobs Entertainment, Inc., which simultaneously purchased all outstanding shares of Black Hawk Gaming & Development and Colonial Holdings. The combined company at that point owned The Lodge Casino and The Gilpin Casino in Black Hawk; The Gold Dust West Casino in Reno, Nevada; Colonial Downs racetrack; and six truck stop casinos in Louisiana.

The company applied for a license to operate a casino in Orange County, Indiana, in 2003, but withdrew its bid in the face of stiff competition. It also made plans to develop a casino in D'Iberville, Mississippi, but pulled out of the project in 2004.

Jacobs held discussions about buying New York racetrack Vernon Downs in 2005, and Casino Aztar Caruthersville in Missouri in 2007, but neither acquisition materialized.

In 2006, Jacobs spent over $2 million in support of an Ohio ballot measure that would have authorized the company to open a casino at the Nautica Entertainment Complex, owned by Jeffrey Jacobs. The measure would ultimately fail. In later years, Jacobs' expanded Cleveland properties would be collectively renamed as the Nautica Waterfront District.

Jacobs purchased the Piñon Plaza casino in Carson City, Nevada, in 2006 for $14.5 million, and rebranded it as the Gold Dust West Carson City. The company opened its third casino under the Gold Dust West name in Elko, Nevada, in 2007.

In 2008 and 2009, the company bought out the shares of Richard E. Jacobs, leaving his son as the sole owner.

The company acquired the Nautica Entertainment Complex from Jeffrey Jacobs in phases between 2008 and 2012. It then purchased the Greater Cleveland Aquarium, located in the complex, in 2014.

Jacobs offered itself for sale to MTR Gaming in 2013 for $145 million in stock, but withdrew the offer after MTR agreed to be acquired by Eldorado Resorts. The Jacobses had begun purchasing shares in MTR Gaming in 2006, eventually accumulating an 18 percent stake in the company. Later in the year, Jacobs made a competing offer to buy MTR, and then withdrew it after Eldorado increased its offer.

Since 2008, Jacobs has pursued plans to develop a casino in Diamondhead, Mississippi. The state gaming commission rejected the proposal in March 2017, but the company filed an appeal.

Jacobs purchased the Sands Regency Casino Hotel in Reno, a few blocks away from the Gold Dust West Casino, for $30 million in July 2017. The company soon began a $500-million plan to redevelop the corridor between the two casinos with mixed-use developments and retail and entertainment venues.

In April 2018, Jacobs sold Colonial Downs, which had been closed since 2014. The track was sold to Revolutionary Racing, a Chicago-based group of investors and gaming executives, for a price of more than $20 million.

== Properties ==
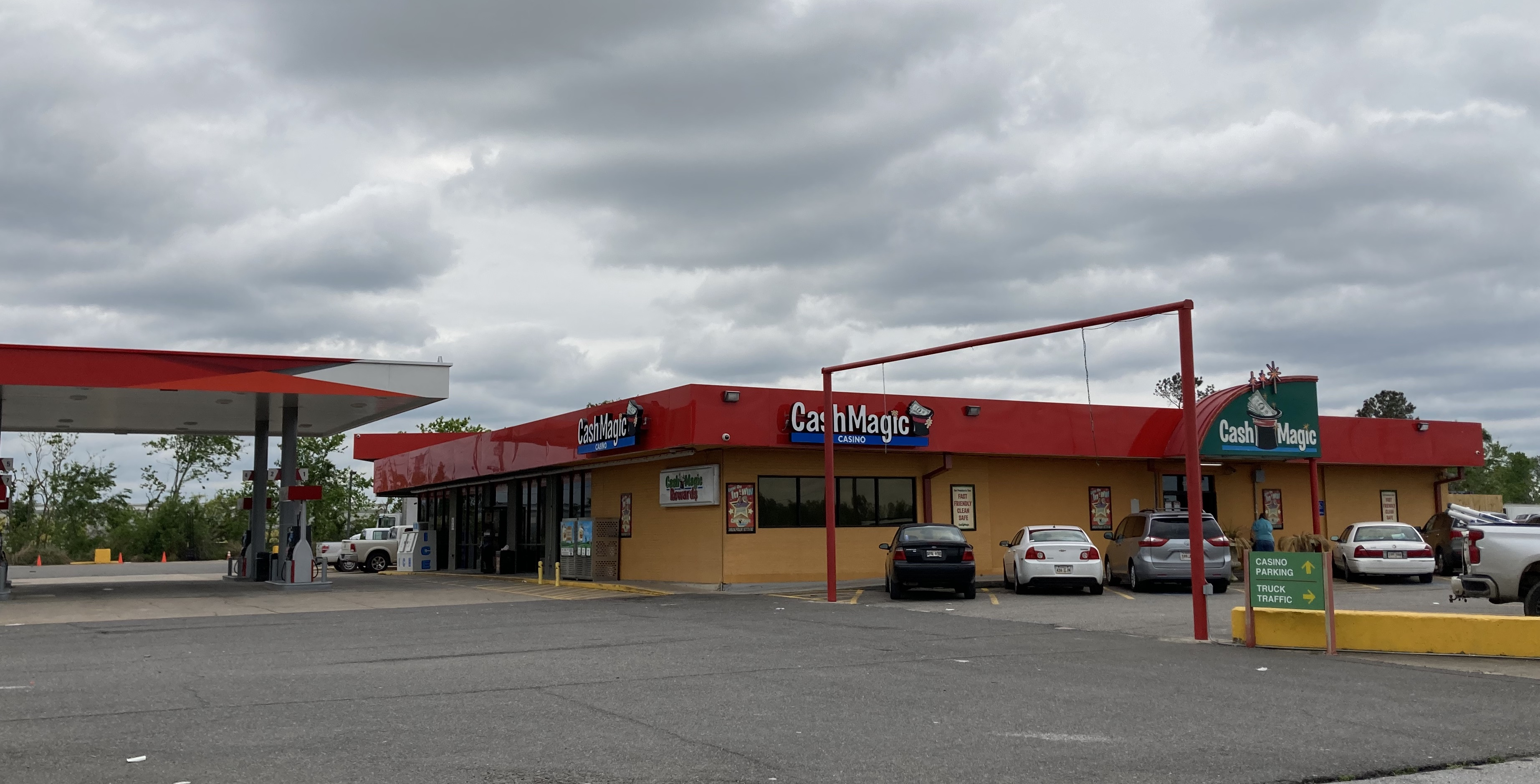
A Cash Magic Truck Plaza & Casino in Louisiana.

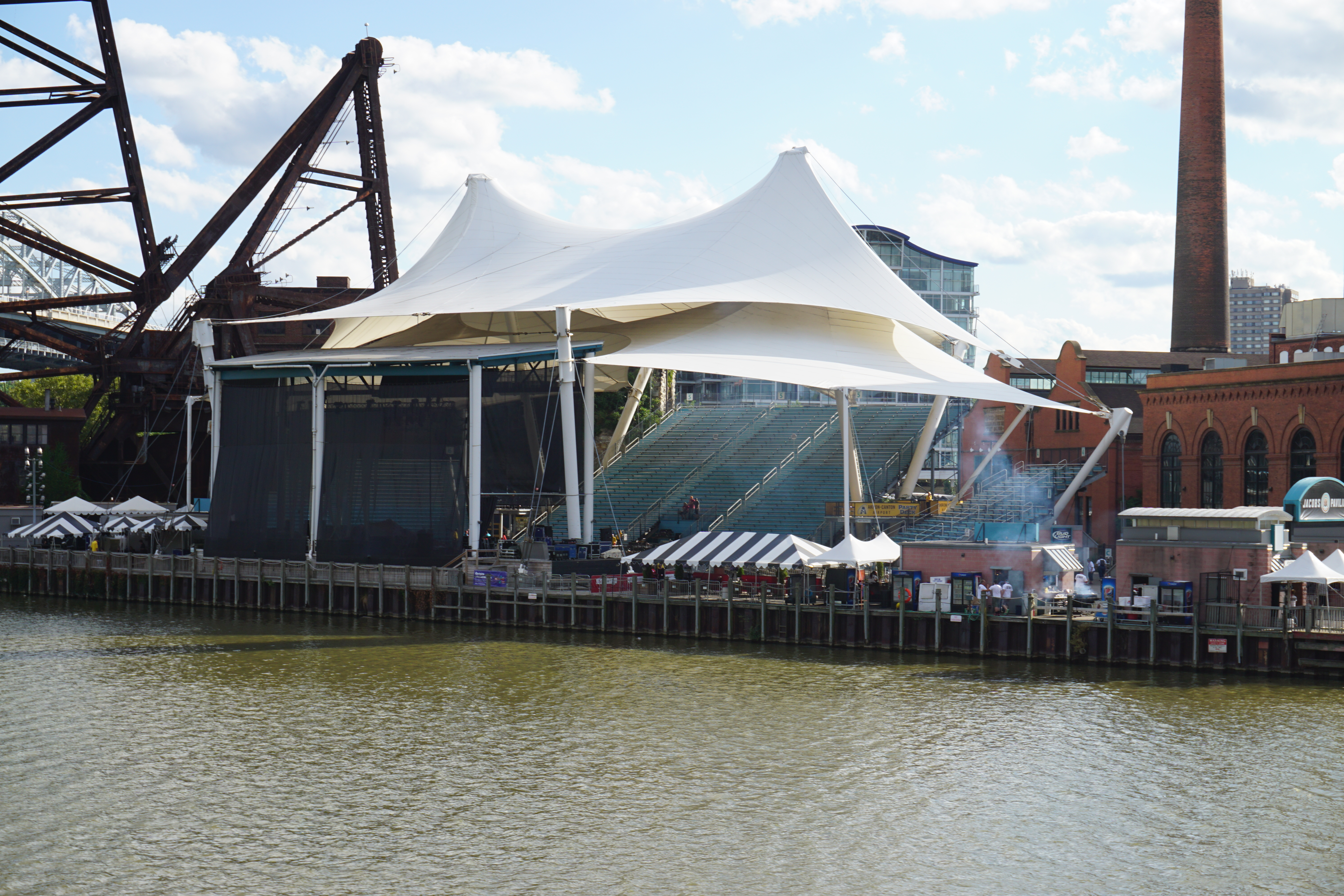
Jacobs Pavilion in Cleveland, Ohio.

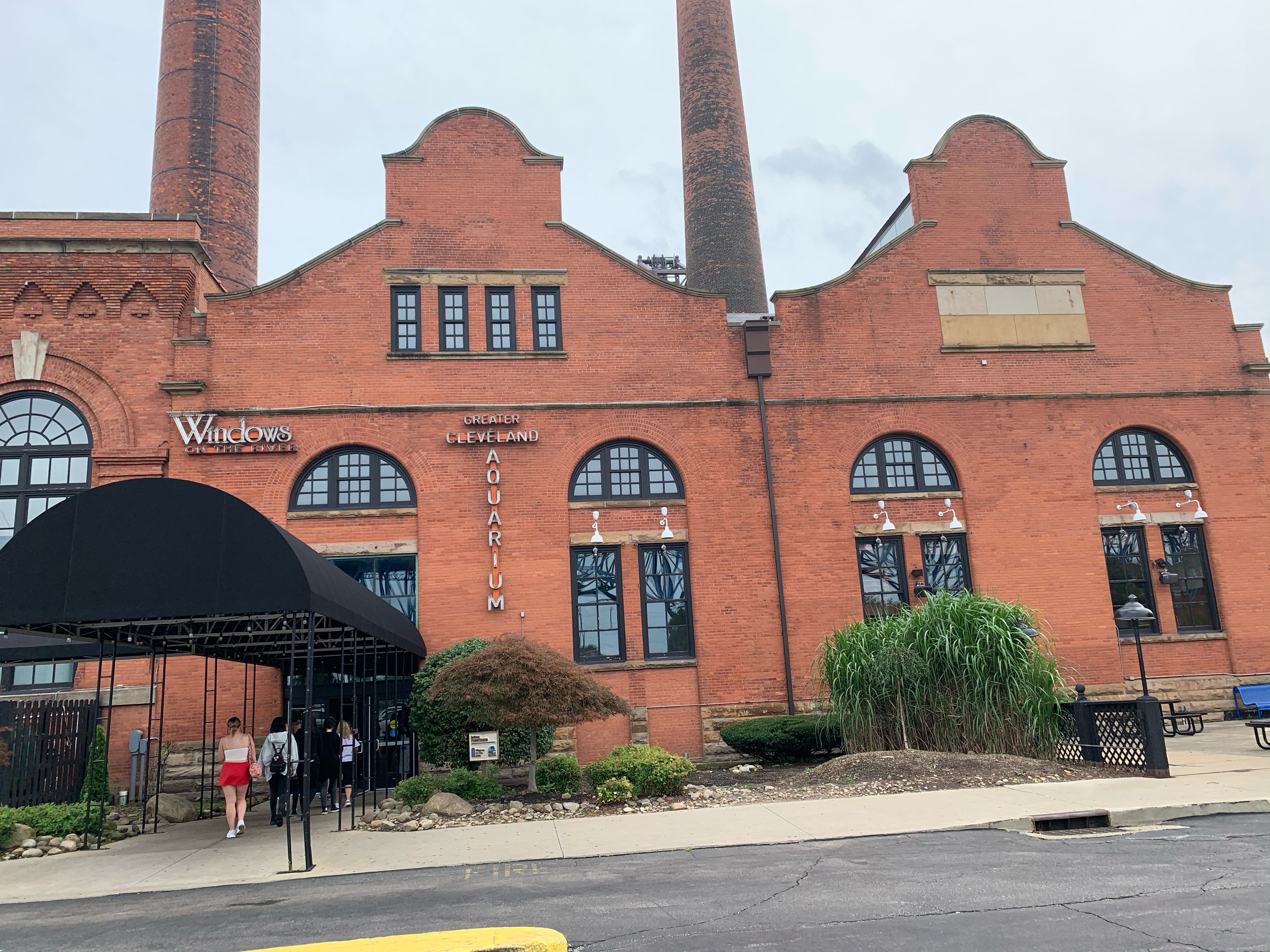
The First Energy Powerhouse Building in Cleveland - home to Windows on the River and the Greater Cleveland Aquarium

=== Louisiana ===
- Cash Magic Truck Plaza & Casino – 23 truck stop casinos located throughout the state.

=== Black Hawk, Colorado ===
- The Gilpin Casino
- The Lodge Casino

=== Nevada ===
- Gold Dust West Casinos
  - Carson City
  - Elko
  - Reno
- J Resort – Reno (formerly Sands Regency Casino Hotel)
- Reno's Neon Line District – Reno
- The Glow Plaza – Reno

=== Cleveland, Ohio ===
Nautica Waterfront District - West Bank of The Flats

- Greater Cleveland Aquarium
- Jacobs Pavilion
- Windows on the River (banquet hall)
- Shooters Waterfront Cafe
- Improv Comedy Theater & Restaurant
- M/V Lady Caroline (dining cruise boat based/docked at Nautica)
- Nautica Tennis Courts

=== Former ===
- Colonial Downs – New Kent County, Virginia (sold in 2018)
- Lolly the Trolley – Cleveland, Ohio (closed in 2022)
- M/V Nautica Queen – (dining cruise boat replaced by Lady Caroline in 2023)
