= J Resort =

Casino hotel in Nevada, United States

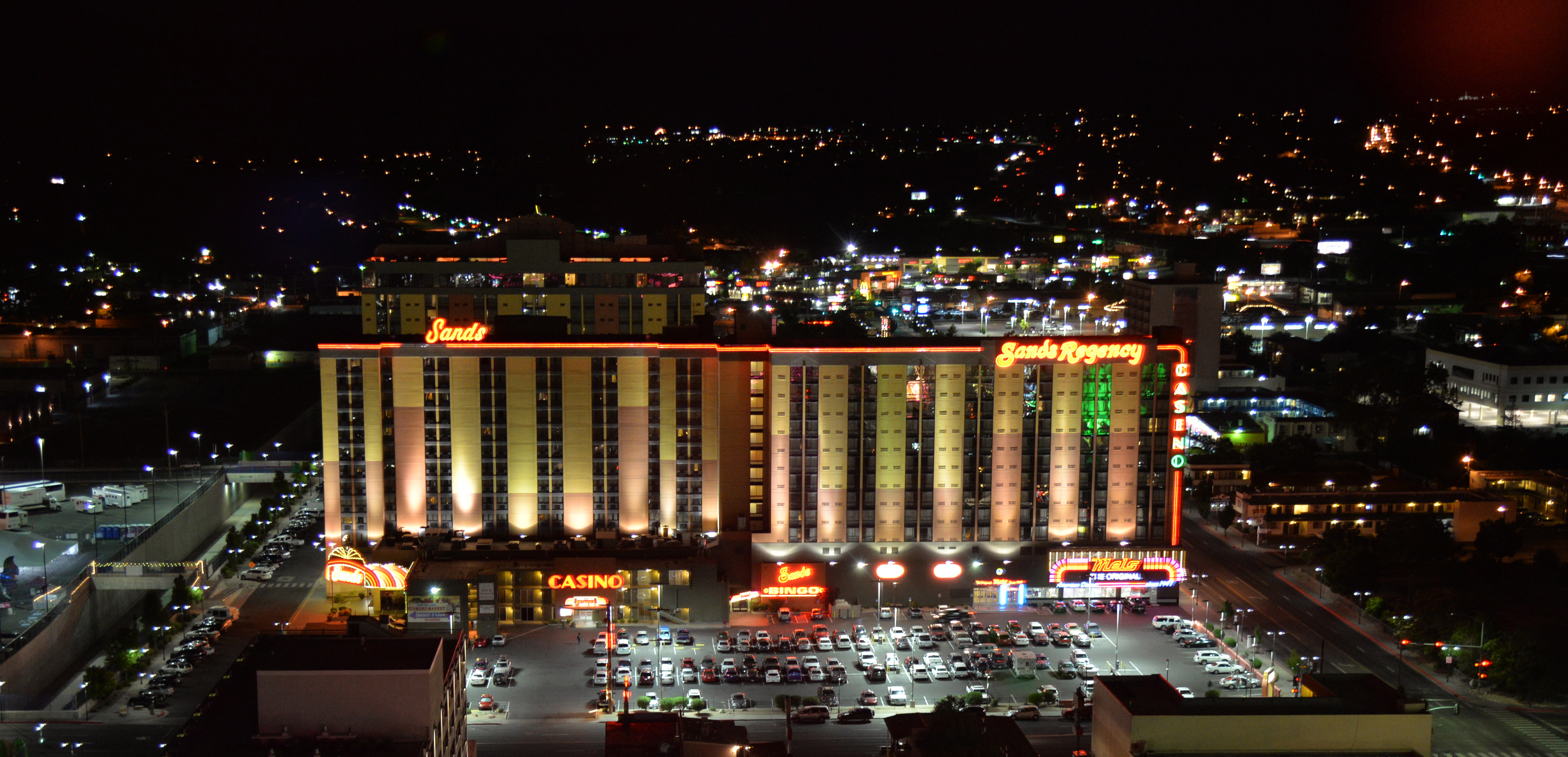
- Interactive map of J Resort
- Location: Reno, Nevada, U.S.; 345 North Arlington Avenue; 39.528267°N 119.818928°W
- Opened: 1970; 56 years ago
- No. of rooms: 518
- Gaming space: 25,791 sq ft (2,396.1 m^{2})
- Notable restaurants: Hanna's Table; Hanna's Express; The Buffet
- Owner: Jacobs Entertainment, Inc.
- Architect: Martin Stern, Jr. and Associates
- Previous names: Sands Regency
- Renovated in: 1979: Dynasty Tower; 1983: Empress Tower; 2023: Aspen Tower; 2023: Birch Tower
- Website: jresortreno.com

J Resort, formerly the Sands Regency Casino Hotel, is a casino hotel in downtown Reno, Nevada. It is owned and operated by Jacobs Entertainment, Inc.

== History ==
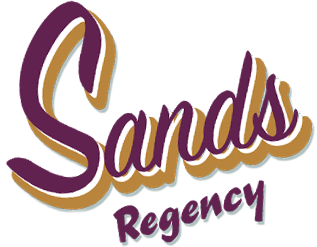
Former logo, as the Sands Regency

The property that is now the J Resort was first opened in February 1965 as the Sands Motor Inn. It was an 80-room motel, developed by Pete Cladianos and his family. An addition was completed in 1970, adding a five-story hotel building with 24 rooms, and a casino with 40 slot machines.

The Sands was not in the most prospective area of Reno at that time and even in some regards to this day, but nevertheless it grew. In 1979, the 15-story Regency Tower was added, with 300 hotel rooms and more casino space. In 1985, the property's name was changed to the Sands Regent to settle a trademark complaint from the Sands Hotel and Casino in Las Vegas. The name was soon changed to the Sands Regency after another complaint was received from the Regent Hotels chain. By 1988, a third and final tower had been constructed, giving the hotel a total of 800 rooms and a parking garage. The new tower was detached from the main two towers but at the same time connected with a link between it and the original towers.

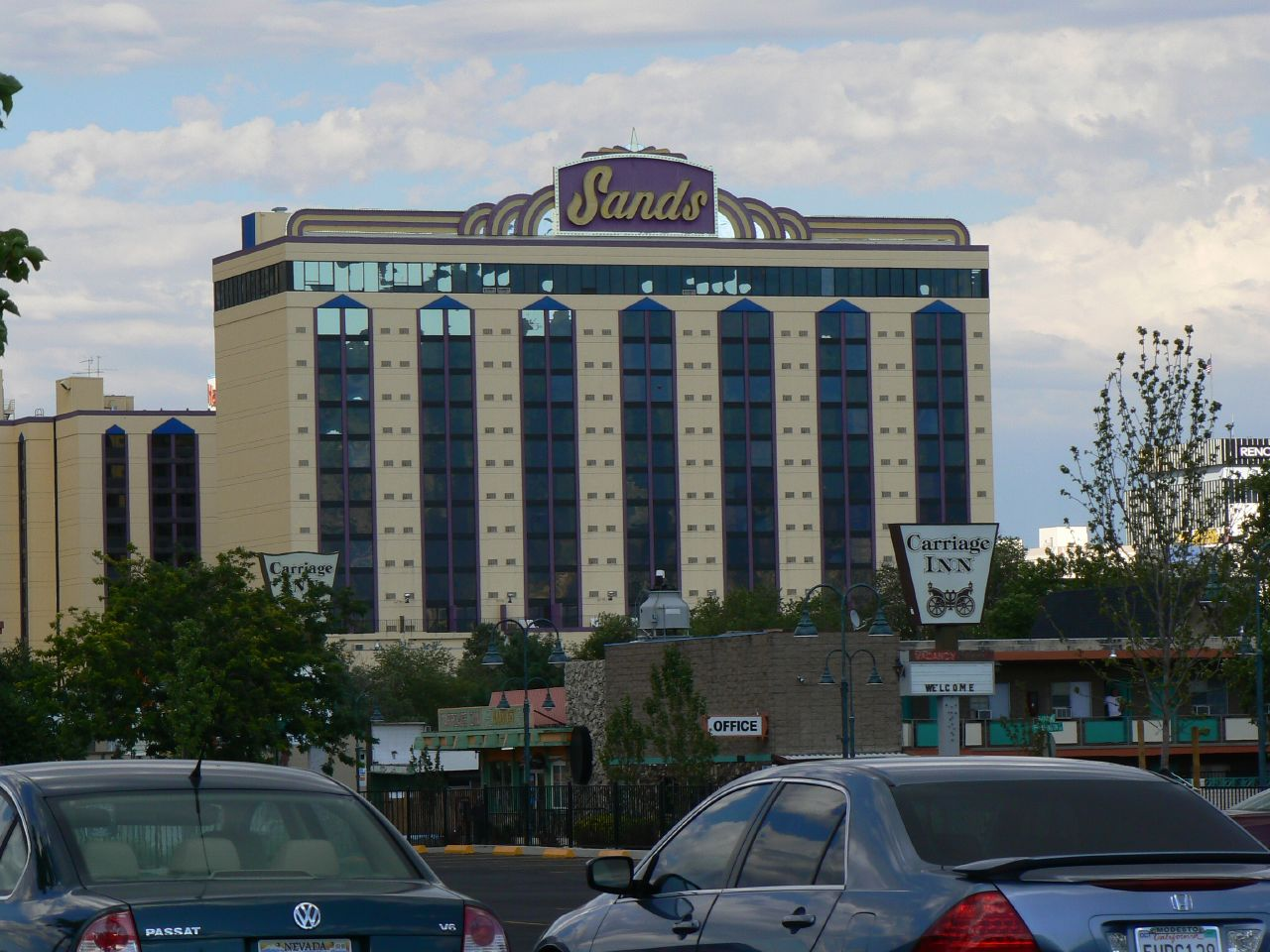
A Sands hotel tower, 2007

The Sands Regency is popular among Reno locals, bowlers and cribbage players, whom they cater to in great numbers. In 1995, Tony Roma's opened a new restaurant location at the Sands Regency, and a comedy club opened in 2000, along with an original Mel's Diner, all gaining to the resort's credibility.

By 2006, Sands Regent owned and operated three properties, all in the Reno-Sparks area; they included the flagship Sands Regency, the small Rail City Casino in Sparks, and the Gold Ranch Casino/RV Park in Verdi, Nevada. Las Vegas–based Herbst Gaming (later Affinity Gaming), famous for its "Terrible's" trademark, began looking into the Reno market in 2005. The company wanted to get into the market quickly and saw opportunity with Sands Regent. Herbst Gaming bid for and won the company assets, finalizing its deal in October 2006. Sands Regent CEO Ferenc Szony remained on board. The Sands Regency became Sands Regency, "A Terrible's Property". A major renovation had begun in 2005, and Herbst Gaming finished it in 2007.

Many Reno locals and tourists know the Sands for its vibrant exterior color schemes; for over 10 years the Sands was always red with white accents, then suddenly overnight in 2003 Sands Regent painted it a bright yellow with blue accents that received mixed reviews. After the Herbst buyout, they painted it a softer gold with red accents to depict a skyline on the hotel towers' facade that received media attention for creativity.

Tony Roma's closed in 2006, and was replaced with Fuzio Pasta and Steaks in 2007, as part of a renovation at the Sands. In 2011, Fuzio's was closed due to lack of popularity and was quickly replaced with a casual-upscale bistro called The Copa. The resort also includes a coffee shop and a buffet, and added Tacos Tijuana in 2017. Mel's Diner closed at the end of 2022.

On February 1, 2013, Affinity sold the Sands Regency, along with the Gold Ranch and another casino in Dayton, Nevada, for $19.2 million to Truckee Gaming, a new company led by Szony. In July 2017, Jacobs Entertainment, Inc. purchased the property from Truckee Gaming for $30 million.

=== J Resort ===
Hotel renovation work was underway in 2019, and company CEO Jeff Jacobs suggested that the property would be renamed following the completion of improvements. The renovation work would become part of a $400 million, multi-phase project. A portion of the first phase opened on March 7, 2023, coinciding with the property's rebranding as J Resort. The $300 million first phase included 500 remodeled rooms and a half-renovated casino, as well as new restaurants and additional parking. The first phase is scheduled to conclude in June 2023, with a $100 million second phase expected to begin soon thereafter. The second phase will include expansion of the casino, a rooftop swimming pool and spa, a sports-themed lounge, and an Asian food and gaming venue and is expected to finish in late 2024.

A digital video display, measuring 65 by 65 ft (20 by 20 m), was added to the hotel tower's north side during the first phase and will display content by artists. The renovated resort will also include a collection of paintings and sculptures worth $100 million. Jacobs compared J Resort to Las Vegas' Bellagio resort, which is known for its art collection.
