= Silver Sevens =

Casino hotel in Nevada, United States

Coordinates: 36.1140°N 115.1524°W

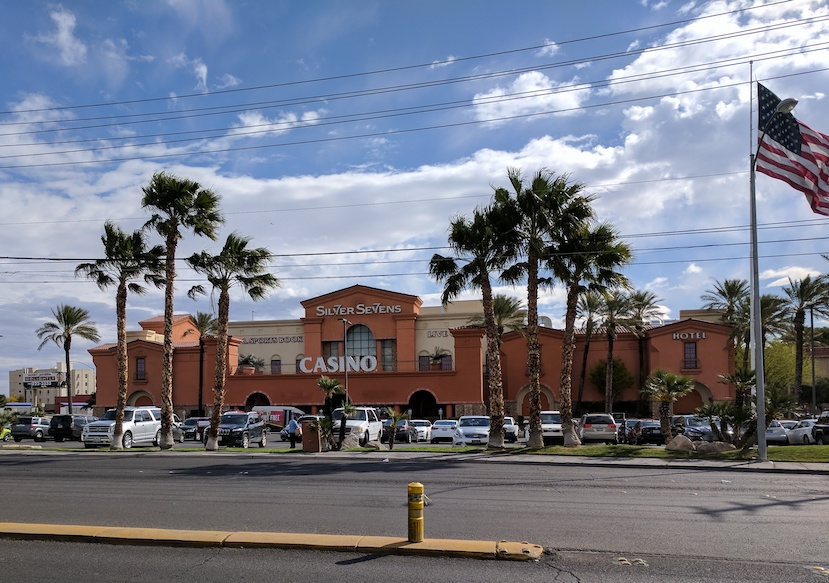
- Silver Sevens in 2017
- Interactive map of Silver Sevens
- Location: Paradise, Nevada; 4100 Paradise Road
- Opened: 1980 (Continental); December 6, 2000 (Terrible's)
- No. of rooms: 327
- Gaming space: 30,225 sq ft (2,808.0 m^{2})
- Casino type: Land-based
- Owner: Affinity Interactive
- Previous names: Continental; Terrible's Hotel Casino
- Renovated in: 2000, 2011–2013
- Website: silversevenscasino.com

Silver Sevens is a hotel and locals casino 1 mile (1.6 km) east of the Las Vegas Strip, in Paradise, Nevada. It is owned and operated by Affinity Interactive. Silver Sevens has 327 rooms and a 30,225 sq ft (2,808.0 m^{2}) casino.

The property originally operated as the Continental from 1980 to March 31, 1999, eventually closing due to financial problems. The Herbst family, owners of the local Terrible Herbst gas station chain, soon purchased and renovated the property. It reopened on December 6, 2000, as Terrible's Hotel Casino. In 2010, Herbst Gaming exited bankruptcy with the family no longer involved in the company, which later became Affinity Interactive. The hotel-casino was rebranded as Silver Sevens on July 1, 2013, following another renovation.

== History ==
=== Continental (1980–1999) ===
Located on 10 acres (4.0 ha), the property began as the Hotel Continental and Casino. Construction was underway in 1979, and the project opened the following year, with 400 rooms. It was owned by a group of individuals, including land owner Ira Levy of Los Angeles. In 1981, Levy and two Los Angeles partners, Albert Barouh and Louis Litwin, received approval to expand gaming at the Hotel Continental from 15 slot machines to more than 250.

A minority owner was Anthony Robone, whose son Nicholas worked at the casino. In 1986, the Robones opened their own casino property, the La Mirage, across from the Hotel Continental. Meanwhile, an anonymous tip was made to state gaming regulators that Nicholas Robone had skimmed money from the Continental. It was later learned that the tip came from Dennis Thomas, a man who owed $2,000 to the Continental. Barouh denied that he agreed to forgive the debt in exchange for Thomas making the allegation, which went unproven.

In 1987, the Federal Bureau of Investigation found that skimming had occurred at the casino, without the knowledge of its owners. Michael DiBari, an assistant slot manager, had rigged the machines to pay out phony jackpots, which would be "won" by associate Alphonse Cuozzo and then sent to the Gambino crime family in New York. DiBari and Couzzo were convicted, and DiBari was added to the state's Black Book in 1998, becoming the 32nd person to join the list.

In 1996, the Continental was sold to Crowne Ventures Inc. for $36 million. The company then transferred ownership to Crowne Gaming, which leased the land to Hotel Continental Inc., a management company for the property. Crowne planned to give the Continental a 1950s theme. This project included the opening of a new restaurant, Big Daddy's Diner, in 1997. Crowne Gaming went into bankruptcy at the end of the year, after American Realty Trust foreclosed on the company.

The Continental itself declared bankruptcy in February 1998. American Realty and the Continental failed to reach an agreement on a new lease, and the property closed on March 31, 1999. The closure affected more than 300 workers, many of whom blamed competition from new, larger properties such as the Bellagio. The Continental had only 500 slot machines.

=== Terrible's (2000–2013) ===
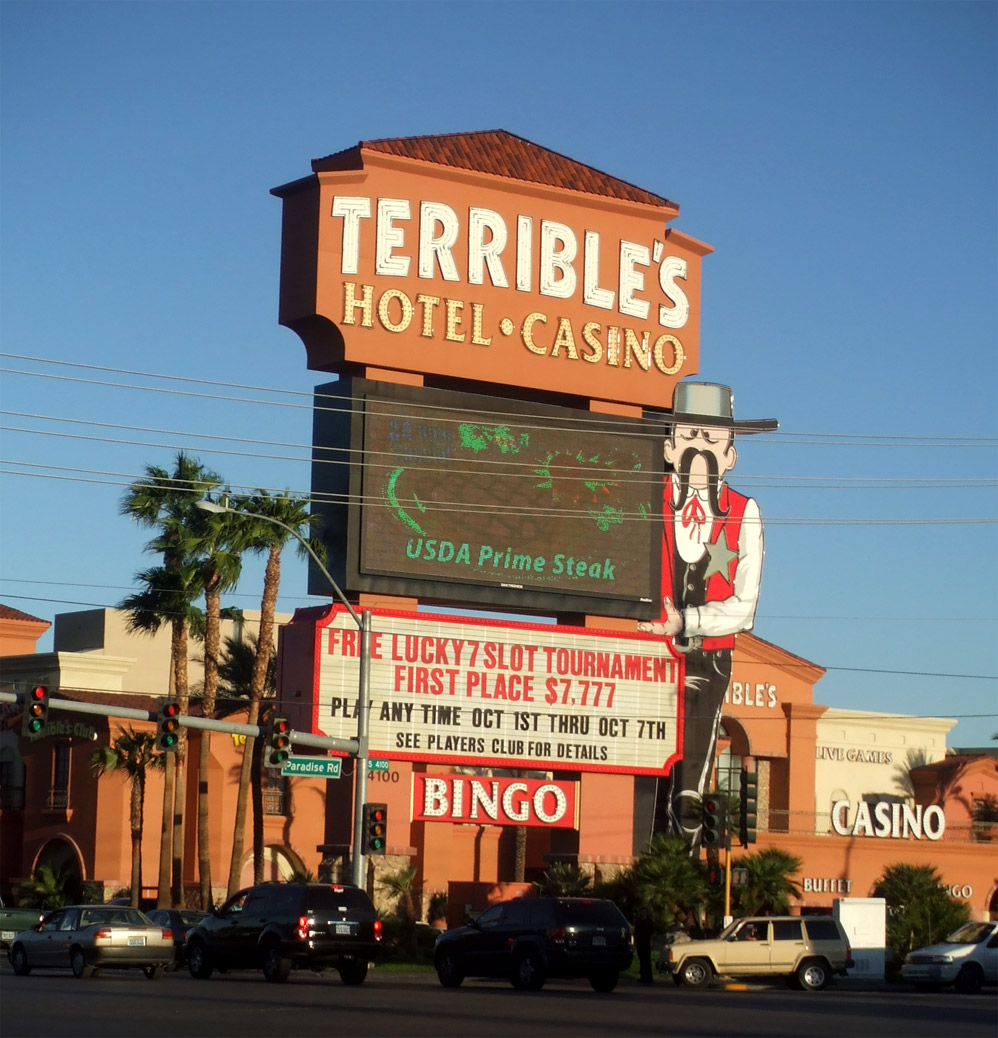
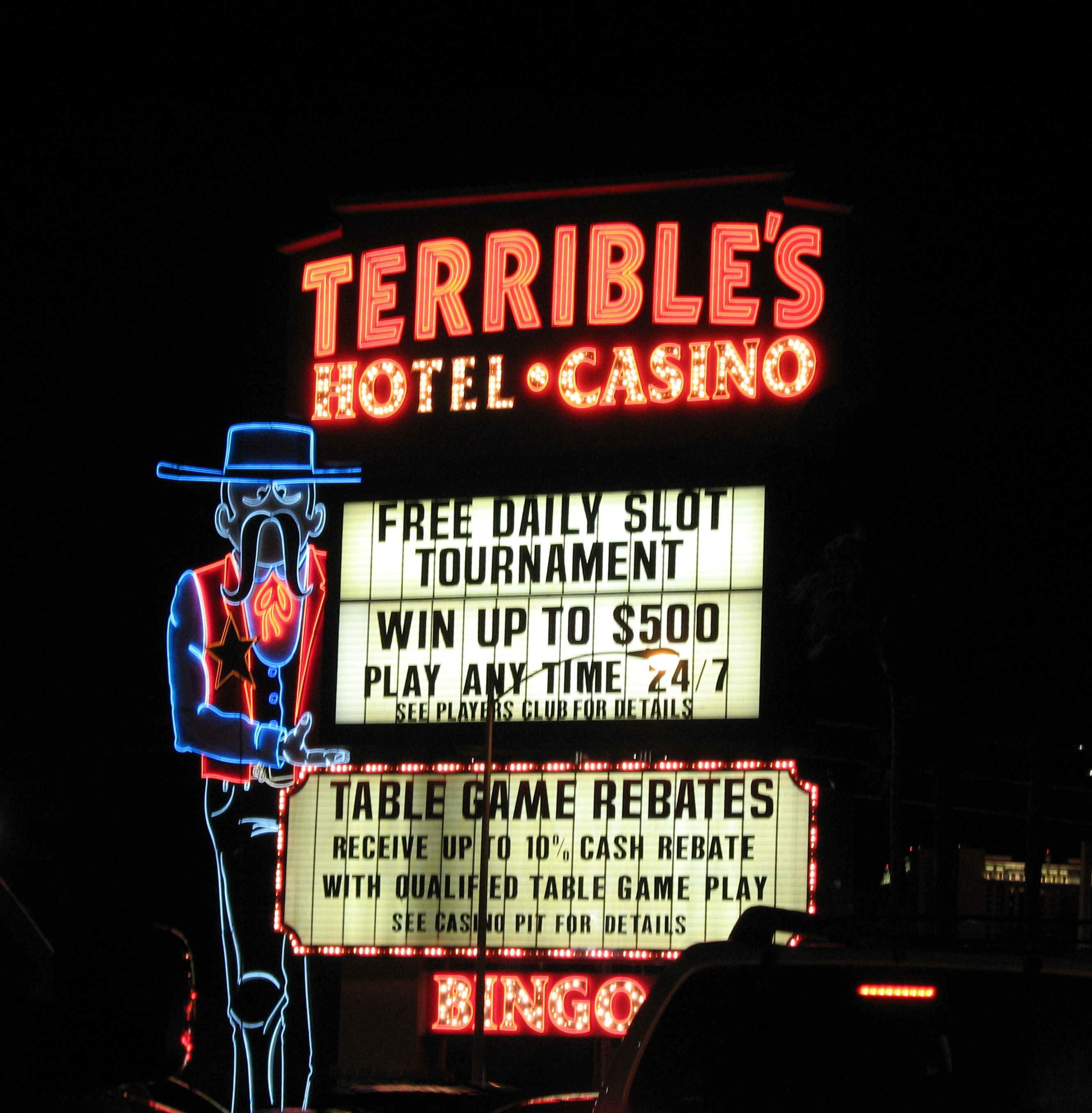
Terrible's neon cowboy sign

In late 1999, the Continental was purchased by the Herbst family, owners of the local Terrible Herbst gas station chain. The family also had a gaming division which operated as a statewide slot route operator, and also oversaw Terrible's-branded casinos in Pahrump, Nevada.

The Continental marked an opportunity for the family to open their first gaming property in Las Vegas, as it was too small for locals casino operators Station Casinos and Coast Casinos, but too big for other, smaller slot route operators to acquire. The Herbsts launched a renovation of the casino, demolishing its interior while keeping the outer shell. The cost of acquisition and renovation was $65 million.

The hotel-casino reopened on December 6, 2000, as Terrible's Hotel Casino. The renovated property included 750 slot machines, a bingo hall, a sportsbook, 370 rooms, and several restaurants, including a buffet. Terrible's hoped to attract locals, including workers on the nearby Las Vegas Strip, with tourists expected to make up 20 percent of the property's clientele.

Some hotel rooms were demolished to make way for a parking garage and a hotel tower, completed in 2007.

The casino's operating company, Herbst Gaming, filed bankruptcy in 2009, and emerged a year later with the Herbst family no longer involved. The company changed its name to Affinity Gaming in 2011, and became Affinity Interactive 10 years later.

An 18-month renovation was completed in January 2013, at a cost of $7 million. The project included work on the property's 327 rooms and the sportsbook, and nearly 1,000 new slot machines were added to the casino.

=== Silver Sevens (2013–present) ===
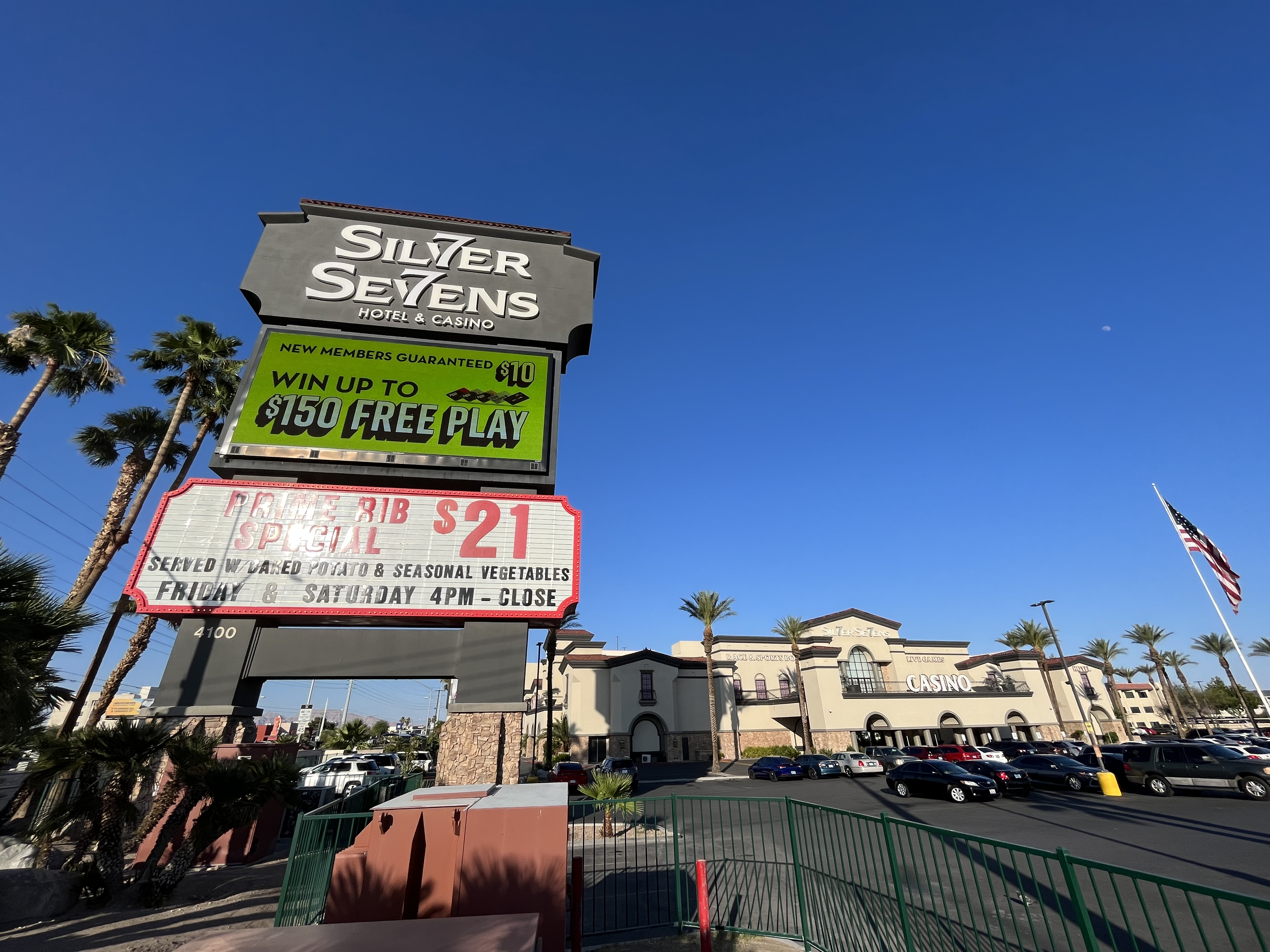
Silver Sevens in 2023

Shortly after the renovation, Affinity Gaming chose to rename the property as Silver Sevens, a reference to Nevada's nickname as the Silver State, while seven is viewed as a lucky number in gambling. The name change became official on July 1, 2013. The former Terrible's cowboy sign was donated to the city's Neon Museum. At the time of its rebranding, locals made up 70 percent of the property's clientele. The casino includes 30,225 sq ft (2,808.0 m^{2}) of gaming space.

In November 2023, plans were announced to renovate the hotel-casino and rebrand it once again as the Continental in 2025. Part of the plans would include a rooftop lounge and Pink Taco restaurant to be built on the hotel's porte-cochère. Affinity suspended the proposed name change a year after announcing it, in order to conduct further market research.
