= Jacobs Pavilion =

Amphitheater in Cleveland, Ohio, US

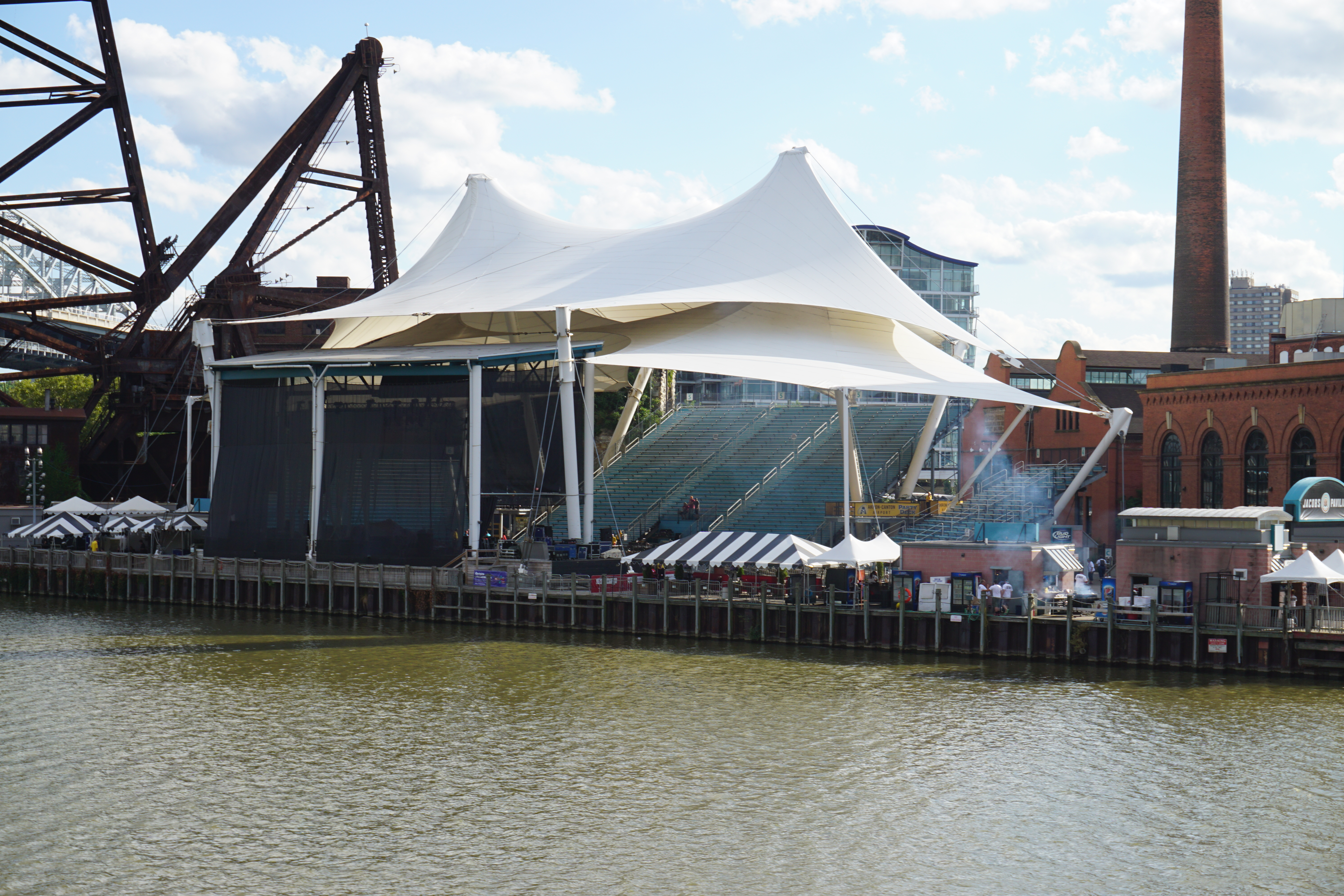
- Jacobs Pavilion as viewed from the Cuyahoga River
- Interactive map of Jacobs Pavilion
- Full name: Jacobs Pavilion at the Nautica Entertainment Complex
- Former names: Nautica Stage (1987-2003); Scene Pavilion (2003-06); The Plain Dealer Pavilion (2006-09); Nautica Pavilion (2009-11)
- Address: 2014 Sycamore Street Cleveland, Ohio U.S.
- Coordinates: 41.495984°N 81.703304°W
- Owner: Jacobs Entertainment, Inc. (booked by AEG Presents)
- Capacity: 4,100 (permanent seating); 5,000 (with temporary floor seating)
- Type: amphitheater

Construction
- Opened: 1987
- Renovated: 2002
- Structural engineer: Geiger Engineers

Website
- https://jacobspavilion.com/

Jacobs Pavilion (originally Nautica Stage, later Scene Pavilion, The Plain Dealer Pavilion and Nautica Pavilion) is an open-air amphitheater located on the west bank of The Flats in Cleveland, Ohio. The venue is part of the Nautica Waterfront District owned by Jacobs Entertainment, Inc.

== History ==
The amphitheater opened in 1987 as Nautica Stage and was renamed Scene Pavilion in 2003, following renovations that included the addition of a canopy.

The naming rights were then purchased by The Plain Dealer in 2006 and it was renamed The Plain Dealer Pavilion, a name which lasted until February 2009 when it was renamed Nautica Pavilion.

Its current name was adopted in March 2011.

The venue offers bleacher and festival seating with a view of the Cuyahoga River, the lights of downtown Cleveland and the picturesque lighted bridges of the area, and typically holds 20 to 30 events with the concert season beginning in late spring, going through the summer, and ending in early fall.

== See also ==
- Time Warner Cable Amphitheater
- List of contemporary amphitheatres
