= Rail City Casino =

Casino in Sparks, Nevada

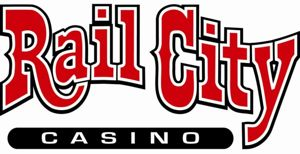
- Interactive map of Rail City Casino
- Location: Sparks, Nevada, U.S.; 2121 Victorian Avenue; 39.53496°N 119.77222°W
- Opened: 1978; 48 years ago
- Theme: Old West
- Gaming space: 23,854 sq ft (2,216.1 m^{2})
- Owner: Affinity Gaming
- Previous names: Plantation Casino (1978–1997)
- Renovated in: 1997, 2006
- Website: railcity.com

Rail City Casino (formerly Plantation Casino) is a casino in Sparks, Nevada. It is owned and operated by Truckee Gaming, LLC. It contains 23,854 square feet (2,216.1 m^{2}) of gaming space, with 896 slot machines, 7 table games, a keno parlor, and a William Hill race and sports book. Dining amenities include the Rail City Ale House and The Buffet & Cafe at Rail City.

== History ==
The Plantation Casino first sought to open in 1976 as a partnership between John P. Richards; his son, John Leo Richards; and William and Joan Schnack. The state Gaming Control Board initially recommended that the license be denied because of the elder Richards's alleged associations with underworld figures. The casino began operations in 1978.

William Schnack, the casino's president, received a gaming license suspension in 1989 for using counterfeit coins in a casino slot machine. Months later, the Richards-Schnack Development Co. agreed to sell the casino to United Gaming (later Alliance Gaming) for $9.5 million.

The property underwent a grand re-opening in August 1997, taking on its new name as Rail City Casino.

In May 2004, Sands Regent bought the casino from Alliance Gaming for $37.9 million. Plans for an $8.5-million expansion were announced in 2005, and were updated in March 2006 with an increased budget of $13.8 million. The casino became part of Herbst Gaming (now Affinity Gaming) in January 2007, when Herbst acquired Sands Regent.

In 2023, Affinity agreed to sell Rail City Casino to Truckee Gaming, a Reno-based company with several small casinos.
