= St. Jo Frontier Casino =

Casino in Missouri, U.S.

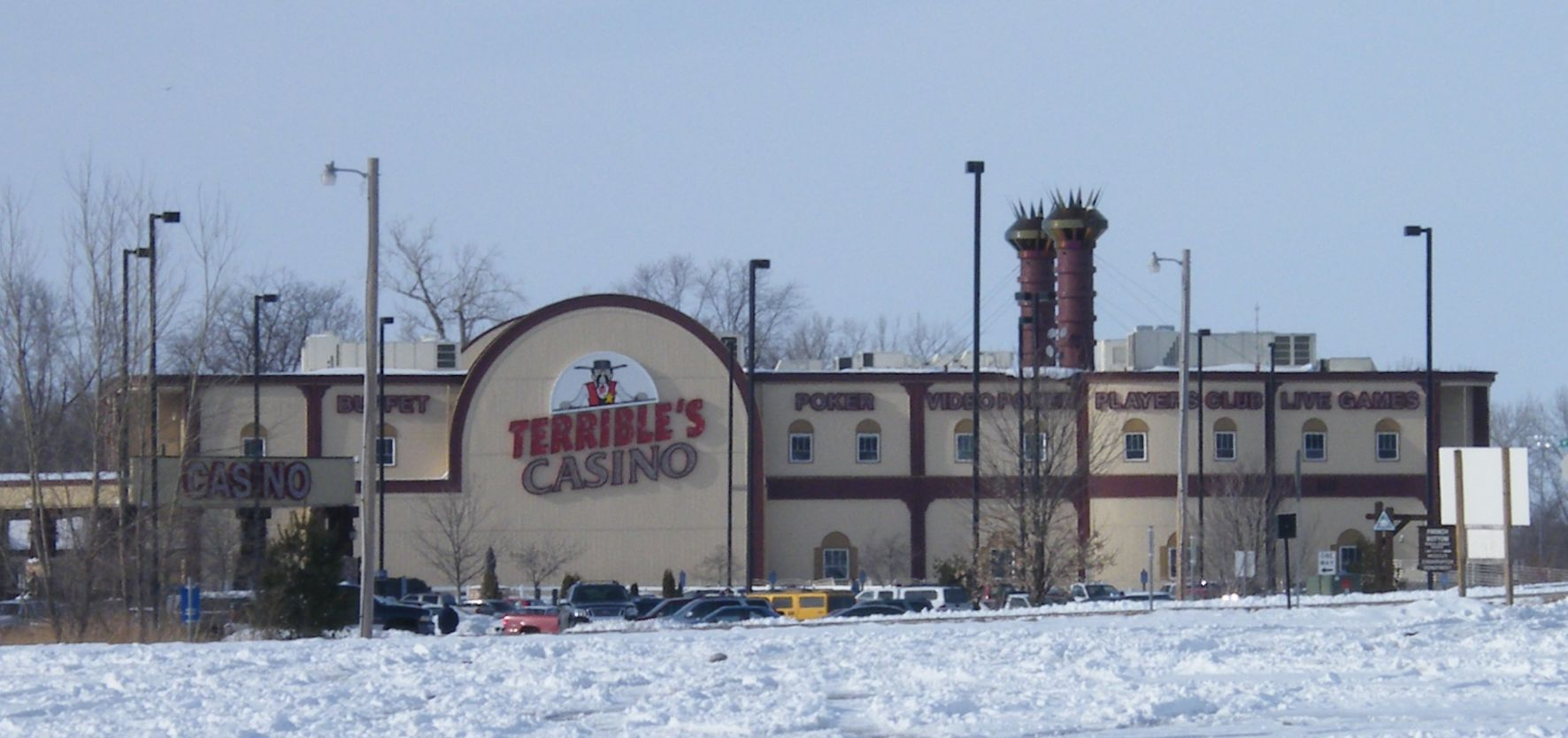
- The casino in winter
- Interactive map of St. Jo Frontier Casino
- Location: St. Joseph, Missouri; 39°49′56″N 95°01′01″W
- Gaming space: 18,000 sq ft (1,700 m^{2})
- Notable restaurants: Winner's, River's Edge
- Casino type: Riverboat
- Owner: Affinity Interactive
- Public transit access: St. Joseph Transit
- Website: StJoFrontierCasino.com

St. Jo Frontier Casino is a riverboat casino on the edge of the Missouri River in St. Joseph, Missouri owned by Affinity Interactive.

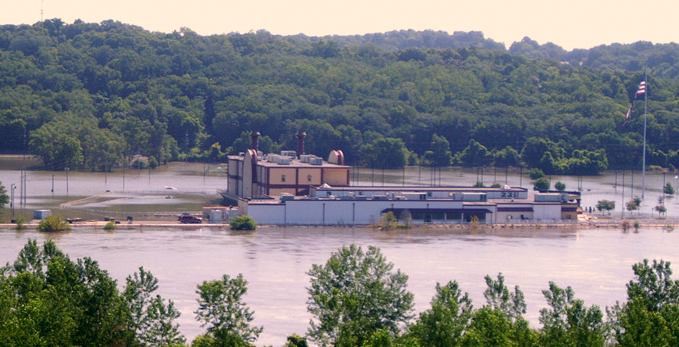
The casino on July 19, 2011 during the 2011 Missouri River floods which temporarily closed the casino.

== History ==
=== William M. Grace ===
The casino is the second smallest in Missouri and was one of original four casinos that opened after Missouri legalized riverboat gambling in 1993. It is in its second structure since William M. Grace opened it on June 24, 1994.

When it opened it appropriated a tourist riverboat The Spirit of St. Joseph that operated out of Riverside Park immediately west of downtown St. Joseph under the Interstate 229 viaduct. It did not have authorization to have slot machines and only card games could be played. The riverboat went on excursions on the river which was to cause some jurisdiction issues with neighboring Kansas.

Missouri voters on Nov. 8, 1994 approved slots. In 1996 the Missouri Gaming Commission ruled that gambling boats did not have to cruise the river and in fact could be within 1,000 feet (300 m) of the river (if river water touched them). Missouri casinos were to build "boats in moats" in concrete basins.

Grace built an $18 million 18,000-square-foot (1,700 m^{2}) boat in a moat three miles (5 km) north of its original location in 1998. The opening was delayed after the Missouri Supreme Court ruled the voters had to approve the boat in moat concept which they did in 1998.

=== Herbst Gaming ===
Grace died in 2005 and Herbst Gaming acquired it along with Grace casinos in La Grange, Missouri and Osceola, Iowa for $287 million. Herbst Gaming which made $16 million in renovations including a Bougainvillea restaurant and live entertainment venue.

Herbst Gaming changed its name to Affinity Gaming in 2011, then to Affinity Interactive in 2021.

== Facilities ==
It has 556 gaming machines and 11 poker tables. It paid $3 million in taxes in 2008 on $18 million in gross revenue and admissions of 579,550.
