= Gold Dust West Hotel and Casino =

Casino hotel in Nevada, United States

Gold Dust West Carson City
- Interactive map of Gold Dust West Carson City
- Location: Carson City, Nevada U.S.; 2171 East William Street; 39.173124°N 119.743609°W
- Opened: 1995; 31 years ago
- Theme: Modern
- No. of rooms: 142
- Gaming space: 17,600 square feet (1,600 m^{2})
- Notable restaurants: Olé Olé; The Grille; The Snack Bar
- Owner: Jacobs Entertainment, Inc.
- Architect: Worth Group
- Previous names: Pinon Plaza (1995–2006)
- Renovated in: 2006, 2008, 2025
- Website: gdwcasino.com/Carson

The Gold Dust West Carson City (formerly the Pinon Plaza Hotel Casino) is a casino hotel located on Hwy 50 in Carson City, Nevada. The Gold Dust West contains 17,600 square feet (1,640 m^{2}) of gaming space, with table games, video poker machines, and slots. The Gold Dust West hotel has 142 rooms. The facility also has a bowling center, snack bar, a heated outdoor swimming pool, and a large hot tub (open in the summer). Like the Gold Dust West Casino in Reno, Nevada, this facility is owned and operated by Jacobs Entertainment, Inc. All 142 rooms and the hotel lobby were fully remodeled in 2025. The Pinon Plaza was owned by Clark Russell, who had owned the Carson Station Hotel Casino in Carson City. Russell operated a shuttle bus system that ran for several years between the Carson Station and the Pinon Plaza.
