= Nevada State Route 605 =

Highway in Nevada

State Route 605
- Paradise Road
- Former SR 605 highlighted in red

Route information
- Maintained by NDOT
- Length: 2.977 mi (4.791 km)
- Existed: 1976-07-01–2001

Major junctions
- South end: SR 593 in Paradise
- SR 592 in Paradise
- North end: SR 589 at Winchester–Las Vegas line

Location
- Country: United States
- State: Nevada

Highway system
- Nevada State Highway System; Interstate; US; State; Pre‑1976; Scenic
← SR 604	→ SR 606

State Route 605 (SR 605) was a north–south state highway in the Las Vegas metropolitan area. SR 605, which comprised a portion of Paradise Road, was turned over to local control in 2001.

== Route description ==
SR 605 began at Tropicana Avenue (SR 593). From there, it followed Paradise Road north until SR 605 reached its northern terminus at Sahara Avenue (former SR 589). The portion of Paradise Road from Harmon Avenue (near the Hard Rock Hotel and Casino) south to Russell Road is part of a one-way pair with University Center Drive (the former is the southbound direction, while the latter is the northbound direction).

== Major intersections ==
The entire route is in Clark County.

Location	mi	km	Destinations	Notes
Paradise	0.0	0.0	Paradise Road south	Continuation beyond southern terminus
Paradise	0.0	0.0	SR 593 (Tropicana Avenue)	Southern terminus of former SR 605; northern terminus of Harry Reid Airport Connector
Paradise	0.5	0.80	Harmon Avenue	End of one-way pair
Paradise	1.0	1.6	SR 592 (Flamingo Road)	
Paradise	1.4	2.3	Sands Avenue west / Twain Avenue east	Eastern terminus of Sands Avenue; western terminus of a segment of Twain Avenue
Paradise–Winchester line	2.0	3.2	Desert Inn Road – Boingo Station	Part of Desert Inn Expressway; provides access to the Las Vegas Monorail
Winchester	2.9	4.7	SLS – Sahara Las Vegas Monorail Station	Provides access to the Las Vegas Monorail
Winchester–Las Vegas line	3.0	4.8	SR 589 (Sahara Avenue)	Northern terminus of former SR 605
Winchester–Las Vegas line	3.0	4.8	Paradise Road north	Continuation beyond northern terminus
1.000 mi = 1.609 km; 1.000 km = 0.621 mi: Concurrency terminus

== History ==
State Route 605 was relinquished to local control in 2001.

== Paradise Road ==
Paradise Road is considered the main entrance to Harry Reid International Airport. The northern leg of the Las Vegas Monorail runs down the center of the road for a portion of the route and then along the eastern side to the monorail's northern terminus.

=== Attractions ===
Notable attractions on Paradise Road include:

- Harry Reid International Airport
- Hard Rock Hotel and Casino
- University of Nevada, Las Vegas
- Silver Sevens Hotel and Casino
- Las Vegas Convention Center
- Westgate Las Vegas
- SLS Las Vegas
- Las Vegas Monorail

== Public transport ==
RTC Transit Route 108 functions on this road.
