= Jeff Jacobs =

American politician

Member of the Ohio House of Representatives from the 6th district
- In office January 4, 1983 – December 31, 1986
- Preceded by: Patrick Sweeney
- Succeeded by: Jim Petro

Personal details
- Born: Jeffrey P. Jacobs; 1954 (age 71–72) Ohio
- Party: Republican
- Spouse: Lynda
- Children: 6
- Parent: Richard E. Jacobs (father)
- Education: University of Kentucky (BBA); Ohio State University (MBA); Cleveland State University (MS)
- Occupation: Businessman
- Known for: Chairman and CEO of Jacobs Entertainment, Inc.

Jeffrey P. Jacobs is a businessman and former member of the Ohio House of Representatives from the 6th district. He is currently chairman, and CEO of Jacobs Entertainment, Inc..
