= William M. Grace =

American businessman (1934–2004)

- Born: September 10, 1934; Burlington Junction, Missouri, U.S.
- Died: April 25, 2004 (aged 69); Houston, Texas, U.S.
- Other names: W. M. Grace
- Occupation: Real estate developer
- Employer: W. M. Grace Companies
- Spouse: Ann Katheryn Grace (m. 1955)
- Children: 3

William M. Grace (September 10, 1934 – April 25, 2004) was a building developer who played an important role in bringing casinos to the Midwest.

== Biography ==
Grace was born on a farm near Burlington Junction, Missouri. He received a B.S. and later an MBA from the University of Arizona in 1959. He taught at both the University of Arizona and later Arizona State University while working as a field engineer for Reynolds Aluminum in Phoenix. He then moved back to Missouri and in 1966 he founded W.M. Grace Construction and W.M. Grace Development Company initially headquartered in St. Joseph, Missouri, but later headquartered in Arizona. In 1970 Grace established branch offices in Denver, Colorado and Phoenix, Arizona with the latter becoming the corporate office. The company designed, built and/or leased shopping centers, office buildings, banks, hotels, casinos, apartments and industrial facilities throughout the central and western United States.

At the time of his death on April 25, 2004, Grace's company was ranked the 31st largest privately held company in Arizona and had constructed over 300 shopping centers in the United States.

Following his death the four Missouri and one Iowa casinos were sold to Herbst Gaming for $287 million. The Woodlands has subsequently closed. Money from these and other business activities are now used by the W.M. Grace Foundation.
