= The Great American Road Trip =

2009 American reality TV series

- Presented by: Reno Collier
- Country of origin: United States
- Original language: English
- No. of seasons: 1
- No. of episodes: 8

Original release
- Network: NBC
- Release: July 7 – August 24, 2009

The Great American Road Trip is a reality television competition series that aired on NBC. It follows seven families as they go on a road trip and compete against each other at different landmarks in and around U.S. Route 66 in the United States. The series is hosted by comedian Reno Collier.

The show premiered on July 7, 2009 as the lead-in to America's Got Talent. However, due to poor ratings, NBC moved the show to Monday nights, with the next episode coming less than a week later. In the second week, ratings declined about 10 percent, as seen in the chart below.

== Structure ==
The families are given recreational vehicles for use throughout the competition. They drive from place to place to compete in various challenges. There are two contests each week. The first is the "King of the Road" challenge, in which the winner receives a reward, and the second is the "End of the Road" challenge, in which the losing team goes home.

== Families ==
The following families are in the competition. They are listed with their hometowns:

Family	Members	Hometown	Placing
DiSalvatore	Amy, Blake, Mason & Silvio	Yonkers, New York	Winners
Coote	Cassidy, Jake, Jennifer & Keith	Lockport, Illinois	Runners-up
Pollard	Aaron, Amie, Anslie & Ron	Wicksburg, Alabama	Eliminated Episode 7
Montgomery	Alecia, Darius, Darius Ross & Tylier	Montclair, California	Eliminated Episode 5
Faverey	Ashley, Dee, Dylan & Lenny	Wantagh, New York	Eliminated Episode 4
Rico	Danielle, Erica, Ricardo & Ricky	Katy, Texas	Eliminated Episode 3
Katzenberg	Andrew, Hyleri, Marc & Sami	Westport, Connecticut	Eliminated Episode 1

== Locations ==
=== Episode One ===
- Wrigley Field, Chicago, Illinois
- Illinois State Fair, Springfield, Illinois
- Gateway Arch, St. Louis, Missouri

=== Episode Two ===
- Ted Drewes Frozen Custard, St. Louis, Missouri
- Meramec Caverns, Stanton, Missouri
- Welk Family Theater, Branson, Missouri
- Route 66 Drive-In Theatre, Carthage, Missouri

=== Episode Three ===
- The Little House on the Prairie Home, Independence, Kansas
- Red Buffalo Ranch, Sedan, Kansas
- The Big Texan Steak Ranch, Amarillo, Texas

=== Episode Four ===
- Midpoint Café, Adrian, Texas
- Albuquerque International Sunport, Albuquerque, New Mexico
- Wigwam Resort (Coote family), Litchfield Park, Arizona
- Wigwam Motel, Holbrook, Arizona

=== Episode Five ===
- Slide Rock State Park, Oak Creek Canyon (near Sedona, Arizona)
- Grand Canyon National Park, Fredonia, Arizona (North Rim) and Grand Canyon, Arizona (South Rim)
- Grand Canyon Railway, Williams, Arizona

=== Episode Six ===
- Roadkill Café, Seligman, Arizona
- Hoover Dam, Boulder City, Nevada
- Rio Hotel Theatre, Las Vegas, Nevada

These hotels were locations during the scavenger hunt:

- Circus Circus, Las Vegas, Nevada
- Excalibur, Las Vegas, Nevada
- Mandalay Bay, Las Vegas, Nevada

=== Episode Seven ===
- Bootleg Canyon Mountain Bike Park, Boulder City, Nevada
- Oatman Ghost Town, Oatman, Arizona
- Soggy Dry Lake Bed, Johnson Valley, California

=== Episode Eight ===
- Los Angeles International Airport, Los Angeles, California
- Universal Studios Hollywood, Universal City, California
- Roosevelt Hotel, Hollywood, Los Angeles, California
- Santa Monica Pier, Santa Monica, California

== Episodes ==
Episode Number	Title	Air Date	King of the Road Challenge	KOTR Winner	KOTR Bottom 3	End of the Road Challenge	EOTR Winner & Runner-Up	Eliminated Family
1	Pilot	7/7/09	One member of the family wears a giant presidential bobblehead. The other 3 family members are the "US Secret Service Agents" helping the "President" navigate the course. The "President" carries ballots and tries to get as many as possible into the ballot box at the end of the course in under 3 minutes.	Coote	Montgomery; Faverey; Katzenberg	Families will have a certain amount of rope attached to a ball that they must push through a series of obstacles, in which there is only one correct path to cross the finish line.	Montgomery; Faverey	Katzenberg
2^{a}	Gateway to the West	7/13/09	Each family has to perform a four-minute show showcasing their families' talents.	Pollard	Montgomery; Faverey; DiSalvatore	The parents have to make their way through a maze of classic cars, grab some food from a concession stand, and bring it back to their family while wearing high-tech versions of blindfolds and being guided by their children.	Coote	None
3	The Heartland	7/20/09	The dads have 30 minutes to cook and the best burger.	Coote	Faverey; DiSalvatore; Rico	The families have to take a bunch of Texas-sized items and fit them on a map of the state.	DiSalvatore; Faverey	Rico
4	Road Warriors	7/27/09	The families have to take mannequins and get as many of them on the plane in the given amount of time, take-off ready.	Coote	Faverey; DiSalvatore; Montgomery	Items are launched into the air and the families have to identify each of them. Afterward, the families had to place the objects on a board in the order that they saw them.	DiSalvatore; Montgomery	Faverey
5	Are We There Yet?	8/3/09	Arizona is known for the "Vortex" so for their next challenge the families get to try out their own vortex. A member of the family will spin the vortex, with someone on it, stop it and then that family member will have to walk to the gong and hit it.	Coote	DiSalvatore; Montgomery; Pollard	Each family member is put in a separate train car. They must work together to pass along codes that open up safes at either end of the train.	DiSalvatore; Pollard	Montgomery
6^{b}	Vegas Baby	8/10/09	Families had to make their very own hydroelectric plant at the Hoover Dam.	Coote	None	As the challenge to win the special night in Vegas, the families must now find their dads (Keith and Ron), who are now somewhere in Las Vegas. They two families are off on their Vegas scavenger hunt.	Pollard; Coote	None
7^{c}	California or Bust	8/17/09	The final three families are taken in a car up a mountain to a zip line platform above Bootleg Canyon. Each family member will ride the zip line and drop paint balls onto large photos of cast members along the way.	DiSalvatore	Pollard; Coote	There is red car in the center of other cars that needs to be driven out of the square, first by moving the other cars around it to create an opening. The catch? The cars can only be moved backward and forward.	Coote	Pollard
8	End of the Road	8/24/09	Both families were to solve a puzzle using cubes with pictures of themselves at each landmark they have visited and place them on a large USA map.	DiSalvatore	None	None	None	Coote

*^Note A: In episode two, no teams were eliminated. Instead, the top three teams in the King of the Road challenge (Pollards, Cootes, and Ricos) faced off in a second challenge, with the winning team receiving a prize. The Cootes received a trip to an upcoming movie premiere in Hollywood.
*^Note B: In episode 6, instead of an End of the Road challenge, the top 2 families compete for the luxury.
*^Note C: In episode 7, there were only 2 teams in the bottom instead of 3.

== Elimination chart ==
	Episode 1	Episode 2	Episode 3	Episode 4	Episode 5	Episode 6	Episode 7	Final Episode 8
King of the Road	Coote	Pollard	Coote	Coote	Coote	Coote	DiSalvatore	(none)
Bottom Two/Three	Favery; Katzenberg; Montgomery	DiSalvatore; Favery; Montgomery	DiSalvatore; Favery; Rico	DiSalvatore; Favery; Montgomery	DiSalvatore; Montgomery; Pollard	DiSalvatore; Pollard	Pollard; Coote	(none)
DiSalvatore	Safe	Bottom 3	Bottom 3	Bottom 3	Bottom 3	Bottom 2	King of the Road	Winner $100,000
Coote	King of the Road	Won; Luxury	King of the Road	King of the Road	King of the Road	King of the Road	Bottom 2	Runner-Up
Pollard	Safe	King of the Road	Safe	Safe	Bottom 3	Won; Luxury	Bottom 2	Eliminated (Episode 7)
Montgomery	Bottom 3	Bottom 3	Safe	Bottom 3	Bottom 3	Eliminated (Episode 5)		
Favery	Bottom 3	Bottom 3	Bottom 3	Bottom 3	Eliminated (Episode 4)			
Rico	Safe	Safe	Bottom 3	Eliminated (Episode 3)				
Katzenberg	Bottom 3	Eliminated (Episode 1)						
Notes	none	See note 1	none			See note 2	none	

- ^Note 1: In Episode 2, nobody was eliminated. The Pollards won the first competition in the episode. The top three competed for a luxury. The Cootes won this competition.
- ^Note 2: In Episode 6, nobody was eliminated. The Cootes won the first competition in the episode. The top two competed for a luxury, and last place was sidelined. The Pollards won this competition.

== Other details ==
=== Episode 2 ===
- The judges for the talent show were Andy Williams, Yakov Smirnoff, and Raeanne Presley, the mayor of Branson.
- After the second reward challenge in Episode 2, the families were treated to an advance screening of the Twentieth Century Fox movie Aliens in the Attic.

== Ratings ==
Order	Episode	Rating	Share	Rating/Share (18-49)	Viewers (millions)	Rank (Night)	Rank (Timeslot)	Rank (Week)
1	"Pilot"	3.0	6	1.3/6	4.66	#8	#2	#20
2	"Gateway to the West"	2.2	4	0.9/3	3.30	#12	#3	#32
3	"The Heartland"	2.3	4	1.0/3	3.46	#10	#4	#25
4	"Road Warriors"	2.1	4	1.0/3	3.56	#12	#4	#26
5	"Are We There Yet?"	2.8	5	1.3/4	4.62	#9	#3	#22
6	"Vegas Baby"	2.8	5	1.3/4	4.37	#10	#4	#23
7	"California or Bust"	2.8	5	1.4/5	4.51	#11	#5	#27
8	"End of the Road"	3.0	5	1.4/4	4.79	#7	#3	#21
