= Interbike =

North American bicycle trade show

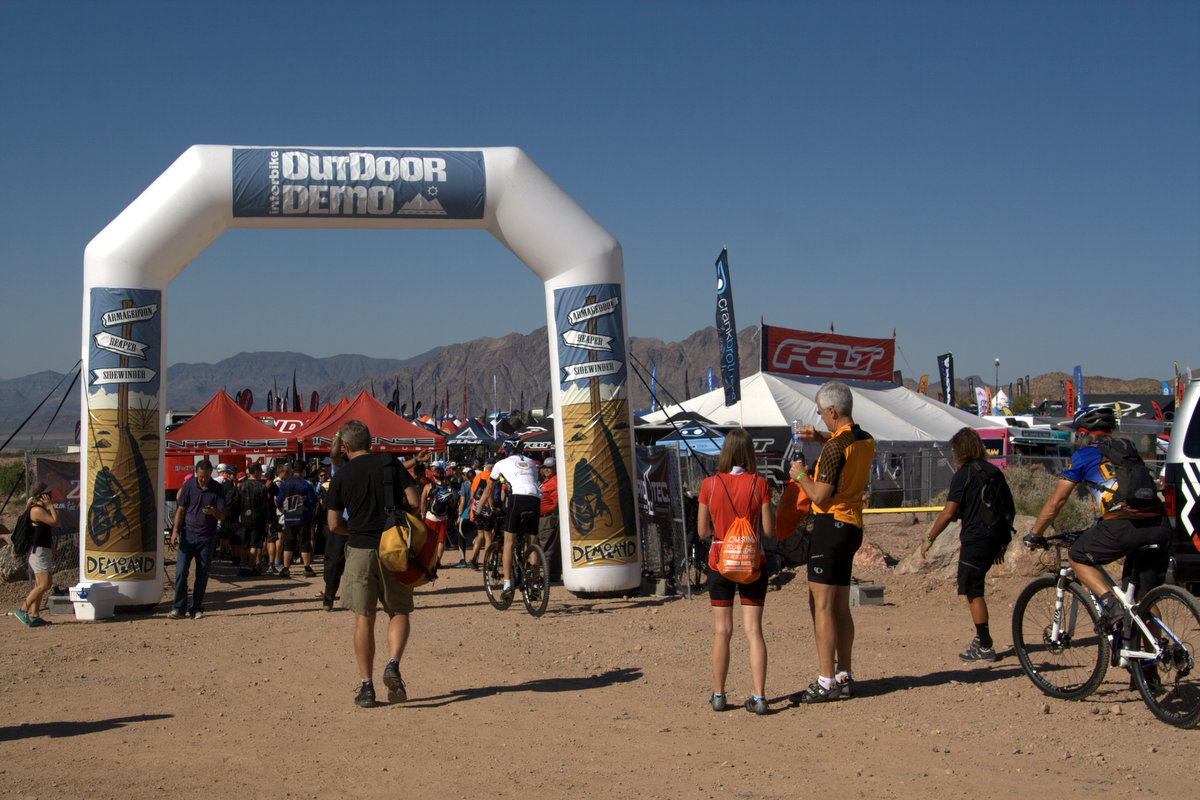
Interbike Outdoor Demo Day 2012

The Interbike International Bicycle Expo was the largest bicycle industry trade show in North America and was held annually in Nevada from 1982–2018. Exhibitors consisted of companies interested in selling their products and services to bicycle retailers, wholesale distributors, and manufacturers. Because of the many new cycling products and technologies that are launched each year to much fanfare at Interbike, the show was also an important media event for the bicycle industry.

== History ==
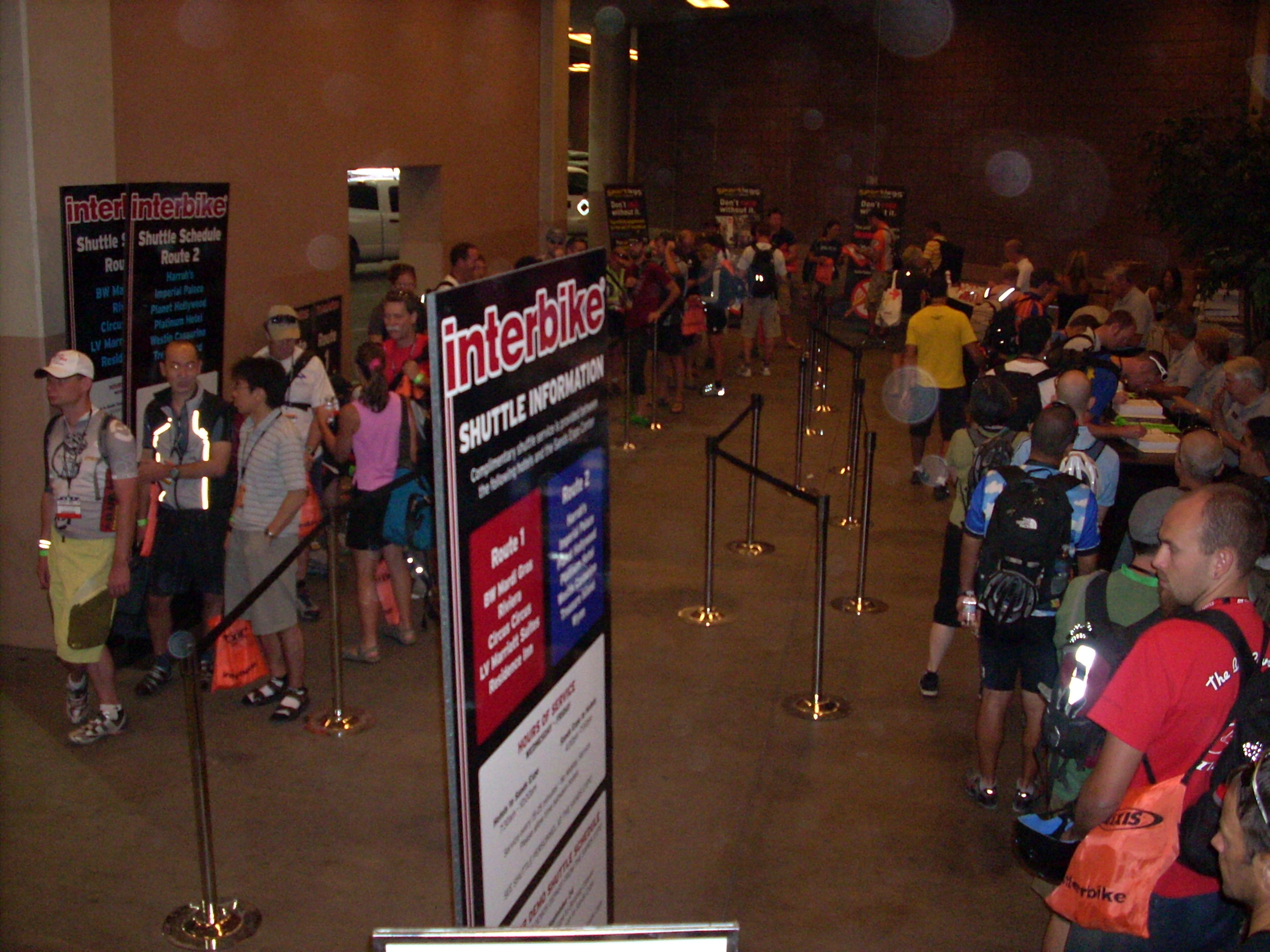
OutDoor Demo shuttle service

Interbike was founded by Steve Ready and Herb Wettenkamp and was first held in Las Vegas in 1982. It has since been held in various years in Reno, Long Beach, then Anaheim, and Philadelphia. Interbike moved to Las Vegas in the late-1990s. Since its founding, Interbike was sold to Miller-Freeman which was then purchased by its current owner, VNU, which was renamed The Nielsen Company in January 2007. Nielsen later sold its exhibitions business; it was renamed Emerald Expositions. Interbike is produced by Emerald Expositions and has its office in San Juan Capistrano, California. This office of Nielsen Expositions also produces the OutDoor Retailer and Health+Fitness Business Expo trade shows.

When it was created, Interbike's timing was unique among the multiple industry trade shows in existence at the time. Early fall, as opposed to the typical late winter or early spring, allowed manufacturers to better forecast and plan for shipping in time for the next spring's seasonal retail business.

== OutDoor Demo ==
Interbike was lastly a five-day event with the first two days being the Interbike OutDoor Demo at Bootleg Canyon Mountain Bike Park in Boulder City, Nevada. The OutDoor Demo is unique among the industry's trade shows in that it provides an opportunity for retailers and members of the media to ride and demo the products that they will be seeing and talking about on the show floor. Due to the success of the OutDoor Demo concept, Interbike launched OutDoor Demo East in Providence, Rhode Island in October 2008 to better serve the needs of the northeastern United States bicycle market.

== Expo ==
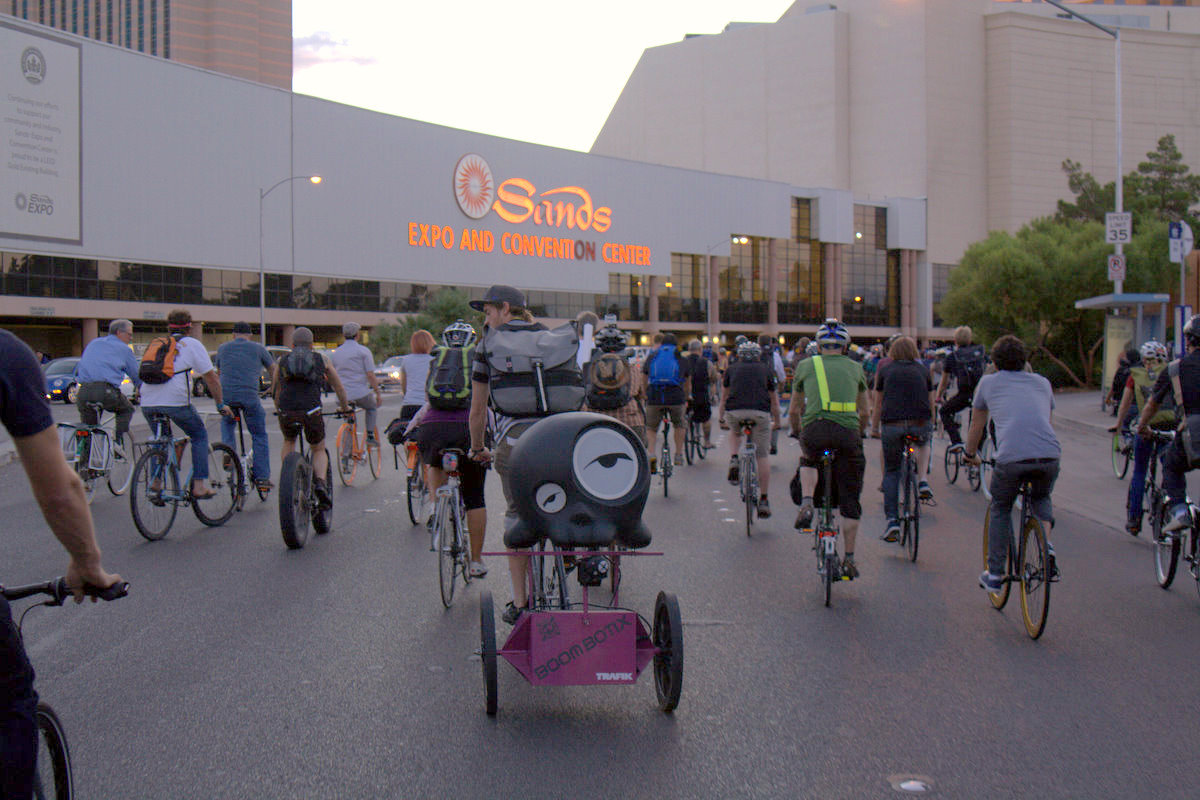
Cyclists hit the Vegas Strip on a Mobile Social ride during Interbike 2011

Immediately following the Outdoor Demo is the Interbike Expo which runs for the final three days of the show indoors, which from 2000 - 2012 had been held at the Sands Expo and Convention Center. Starting in 2013, Interbike will be at Mandalay Bay Convention Center, which allows show organizers to create a new floor plan with product-themed "neighborhoods" and better traffic flow. For 2014 they have added room for more than 200 more exhibitors than in 2013. The space has more loading docks and freight doors than the Sands, allowing easier set up and break down.

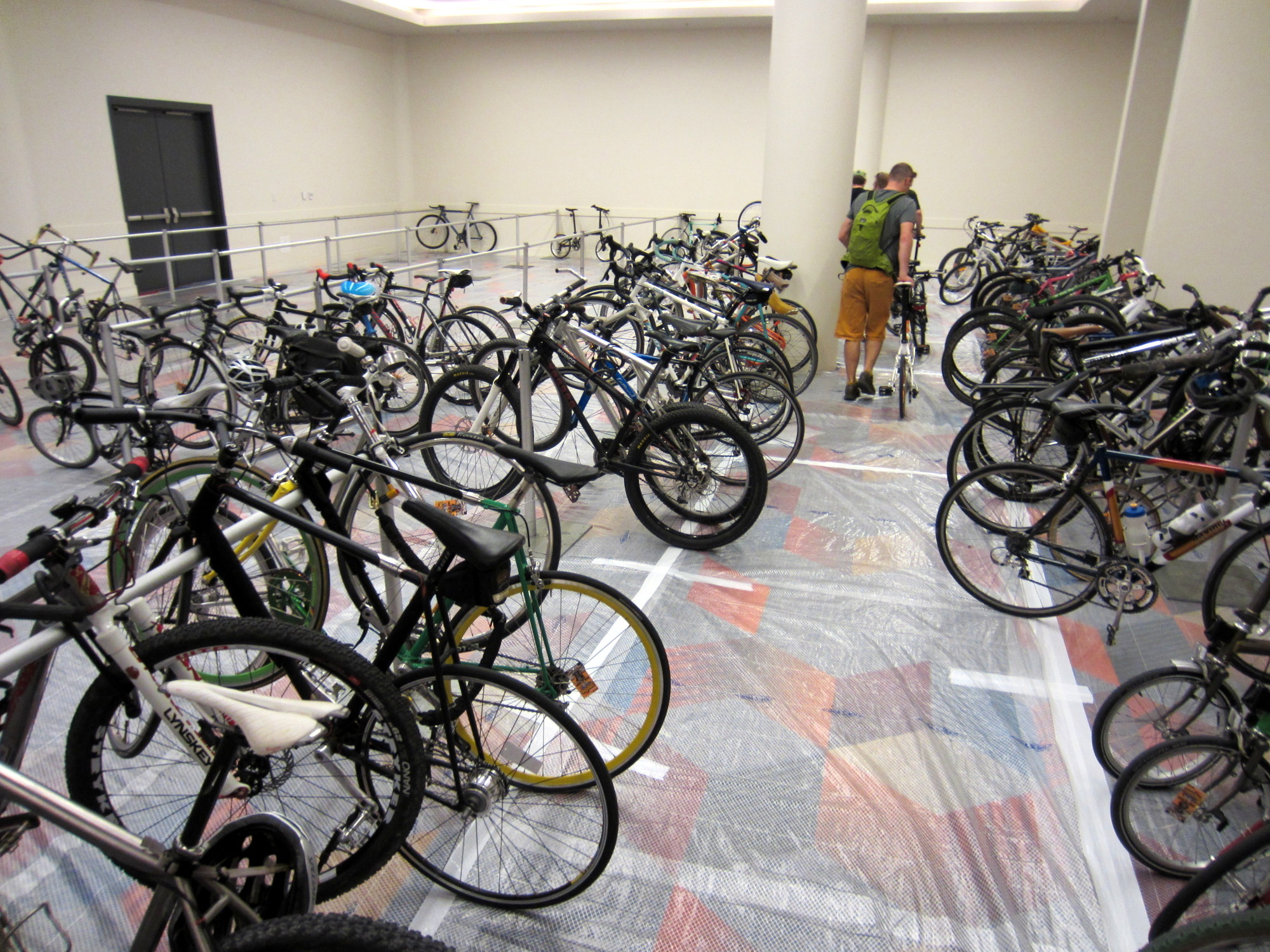
Interbike bike parking. People can park their bike for free in a specially designated area during the show

Although not officially part of the show, a "Mobile Social" bike ride has been organized for the past few years during one evening of the indoor Expo. Typically, more than one hundred cyclists gather outside the main entrance of the convention center—many riding and showing off custom-built bicycles and gear—to cruise down the Las Vegas Strip.

== Customer Appreciation Day ==
In 2013 Interbike introduced a "Customer Appreciation Day" on the last day of the show, allowing the general public to attend. In 2015 Interbike partnered with My City Bikes as the presenting sponsor of Customer Appreciation Day.

== Cross Vegas ==
Cross Vegas, America’s biggest cyclocross race, was held for the eighth time Wednesday, September 10, 2014 at Desert Breeze Soccer Complex in Las Vegas. What has become a spectacle as much as a cross race is held under the lights following the first day of the Interbike Indoor Show.

== Stats ==
According to Interbike, the show has averaged approximately 700 exhibiting companies and between 18,000 - 24,000 total attendees, depending on the year. The show covers a total of more than 300,000 net square feet (28,800 Sq. meters) of exhibit space in the Sands Expo and Convention Center's 660,000 square feet (61,316 Sq. meters) of floor space.

== See also ==
- Eurobike
- Taipei International Cycle Show
