= Boulder City High School =

Coordinates: 35.971°N 114.834°W

- 1101 Fifth St; Boulder City, NV 89005; United States

Information
- Type: Public high school
- Motto: "Success is an endless flight" "Bringing Forth The Best From Within"
- Established: Original location in 1949; Current location ground breaking in 1960
- Principal: Amy Wagner
- Teaching staff: 33.00 (FTE)
- Grades: 9–12
- Enrollment: 616 (2024-2025)
- Student to teacher ratio: 18.67
- Campus size: 25 acres (10 ha)
- Campus type: Urban
- Colors: Navy and gold
- Mascot: Bald eagle
- Website: bouldercityhighschool.com

Boulder City High School (also known as BCHS) is a public high school in Boulder City, Nevada, United States. Boulder City High School is part of the Clark County School District.

== History ==
City Hall was originally the Boulder City Elementary School, completed on September 26, 1932 by the Bureau of Reclamation and operated with Six Companies funds. The building has distinctive brick patterns along the front and end walls and a red clay tile roof; it has been restored on the outside of the building to closely resemble its original appearance. The school was outgrown quickly after its construction. Many additional satellite schools were created throughout Boulder City, such as the basement of Grace Community Church, the American Legion Hall, and Camp Williston buildings.

On March 4, 1941, ground was broken for the first Boulder City High School, what is currently City Hall. Before the high school was built, Boulder City High School students were bused to Las Vegas and graduated from Las Vegas High School. The first class to graduate from Boulder City High School was 1942.

In 1949 ground was broken for what is today's Boulder City High School located on 5th Street and the end of California, which was followed by Mitchell Elementary School in 1970, Garrett Junior High School in 1979, and King Elementary School in 1991.

The yearbook is entitled the Aquila, which is the Latin word for eagle.

== Administration ==
Principal: Amy Wagner Assistant principal: Daphne Brownsen Dean of students: TJ Steckelberg

In August, 2014, Principal Kent Roberts left Boulder City High School to lead Green Valley High School in Henderson, Nevada. Assistant Principal Amy Wagner became the official principal during the 2014-2015 school year.

== Location ==
Located between 5th Street on the north and Adams Boulevard to the south, Avenue G to the east, and Avenue B to the west, Boulder City High School is located on a 25-acre campus.

== Traditions ==
The school is known for its annual homecoming parade. In the 1970s BCHS students would go to the top of "B" hill for a large bonfire to celebrate Homecoming. Prior to that the "B" was outlined with torches or lanterns so that it could be seen at night throughout the city. "B" hill now is all residential.

== Athletics ==
The school competes in the Nevada Interscholastic Athletic Association at the Division 3A Level. It offers 14 sports programs.

=== Flag Football ===
Boulder City high school's flag football team is notable for the dominating program and state championship in 2015. Flag football became a CCSD girls sport in the 2012-2013 school year as a winter sport. Unlike other sports, flag football was based on location and region, not by student population. This caused a disadvantage to smaller schools having to play larger schools in the same bracket for the CCSD title. In the 2014-2015 school year, the lady eagles came back for another dominating season. The Lady Eagles went undefeated again in regular season, to take the Southeast Title and end again with an 18-0 season. Post season the lady eagles continued to move forward in the tournament blanking opponents like Del Sol and Green Valley. The Flag Football team went on to win the Sunrise title against Foothill, beating the Falcons 20-0 and securing their spot in the state game. The state game was located at Del Sol High School where Boulder City played the Sunset Champions, Centennial. There the Lady Eagles beat Centennial 7-6 and ended the season undefeated with a 22-0 record to take the CCSD Championship.

== Notable alumni ==
=== Entertainment ===
- Deanna Brooks – model (Playboy Magazine) and actress. Born Deanna Wilson on April 30, 1974 in Boulder City, Nevada, but graduated from Bellbrook High School in Ohio in 1992; she did not attend Boulder City High School. Playmate of the Month in the May, 1998 issue of Playboy. Acted in several movies and television shows including The Girls Next Door and Ripley's Believe It or Not.
- Rick Dale – host of American Restoration on the History Channel. Born in Newport Beach, California, the family moved to Boulder City, Nevada, when Rick was 13. Class of 1977.
- Ron Dale – American Restoration. Born in Boulder City in 1970. Graduated in the class of 1988. Played football with the USC Trojans, and held many NCAA records.
- Kathy Evison – model and actress. No evidence she attended Boulder City High School and likely graduated from a California high school because she is an alumna of University of California, Davis.She appeared at first in two Spelling productions, The Heights and Beverly Hills, 90210, before she got a regular role in seaQuest 2032.
- Jennifer Lyon – was eliminated from Survivor: Palau by losing a fire-building challenge to Ian Rosenberger after their Tribal Council vote was tied. She died from breast cancer in 2010.
- Byron Velvick – actor, model, and reality TV contestant. Appeared on The Ellen DeGeneres Show, Jimmy Kimmel Live!, The View, a contestant on The Bachelor, the host of Going Coastal, and on 20/20 "Inside the Bachelor: The Stories Behind the Rose" in 2010.

=== Athletics ===
- Jim Aylward – former professional baseball player, Philadelphia Phillies, California Angels, Wei Chuan Dragons, (Taiwan Professional League) Graduated Boulder City High School 1983. Attended Grand Canyon College and was Captain of team when they won the NAIA National Championship.

=== Other ===
- Shane E. Patton – Petty Officer 2nd Class (SO2), U.S. Navy. Killed in action in the Hindu Kush Mountains, Kunar Province of Afghanistan, during Operation Red Wings on 28 June 2005.
