= Illinois State Fair =

Annual agricultural festival in Springfield, Illinois, US

Coordinates: 39.836°N 89.642°W

- Genre: State fair
- Date: every August
- Frequency: Annually
- Location: Springfield, Illinois
- Years active: 1853-1860; 1865-1892; 1894–1916; 1919–1941; 1946–2019; 2021–
- Inaugurated: 1853; 173 years ago
- Attendance: 723,079 (2025)
- Sponsor: State of Illinois
- Website: statefair.illinois.gov

The Illinois State Fair is an annual festival, centering on the theme of agriculture, hosted by the U.S. state of Illinois in the state capital, Springfield. The state fair has been celebrated almost every year since 1853. Currently, the fair is held annually at the Illinois State Fairgrounds over an 11-day period in mid-August of each year.

In 2025, the Illinois State Fair was held from August 7-17 and had 723,079 fairgoers in attendance, described as the second-best attendance in all-time Fair history.

== History ==
The first Illinois State Fair was celebrated in 1853 in Springfield. In that first year, the admission fee was 25 cents. The fair moved to Chicago in 1855. The 1850s were a golden age of agricultural journalism, with a wide variety of editors offering many suggestions, well-founded or not, to increase farm productivity. The first State Fairs, in Illinois and other states, were created and organized by farmers in order to compare notes with their colleagues and distinguish between good and bad advice.

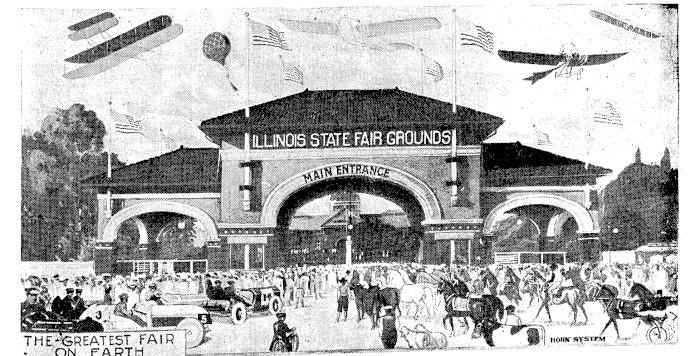
The Illinois State Fair - from Farm Home newspaper, 1916

During the years after the Civil War, the rules of agricultural judging became standardized, and more and more farmers began to show their farm products. Increasing knowledge of genetics inspired the breeding and showing of purebred farm animals at both county fairs and the Illinois State Fair.

In the first half of the 20th century, the internal combustion engine revolutionized life on the American farm, with manufacturers of agricultural machinery eagerly taking advantage of occasions like the Illinois State Fair to demonstrate their new products.

The Illinois State Fair was held almost every summer during this more than 150-year-long period. On a few occasions it was suspended. In 1893, for example, the organizers of the World's Columbian Exposition in Chicago prepared to offer a larger lineup of agricultural products and machinery, so the Illinois State Fair canceled itself for one year.

The Illinois State Fair, like many state fairs, moved during the first 40 years of its life, 1853–1892, from place to place. It was celebrated as far north as Freeport and as far south as Du Quoin. In 1894, the State of Illinois began to use a 156-acre (0.63 km^{2}) parcel of land on the northern boundary of Springfield, which became the heart of the permanent Illinois State Fairgrounds. A grandstand and racetrack were built, and the first auto races were held at the Illinois State Fairgrounds Racetrack in 1910. The fairground site was expanded to its current 366-acre (1.48 km^{2}) dimensions in 1924.

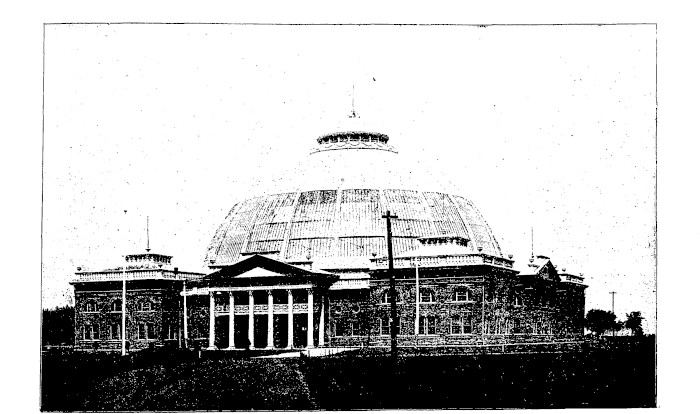
The Dome Building

During 1895, the Dome Building was constructed on the grounds. The building's huge glass dome, the world's second largest unsupported dome at 222 feet in diameter, had been part of the 1893 Chicago World's Fair. It was purchased for $69,000, taken down in Chicago and reassembled at the state fairgrounds. The building could accommodate 10,000 people and housed horticultural displays and National Guard offices. In 1917, about 1,500 soldiers waiting to go to war were temporarily housed in the Dome Building. On August 17, the building caught fire. Within 30 minutes after the fire was discovered, the huge glass dome came crashing down. At the time of the fire the building was valued at $300,000, but insured for only $20,000, and as a result, the remains of the building were later demolished. Apparently the soldiers were not to blame for the fire nor were any injured by it. Besides that year, there was also no fair in 1918 because of the Spanish flu.

There was no state fair during the period 1942-1945 because the fairgrounds were used as a U.S. Army Air Force supply depot. According to one historian, in the fall of 1943 more than 1,000 Chinese military personnel were trained on the grounds.

== Present ==
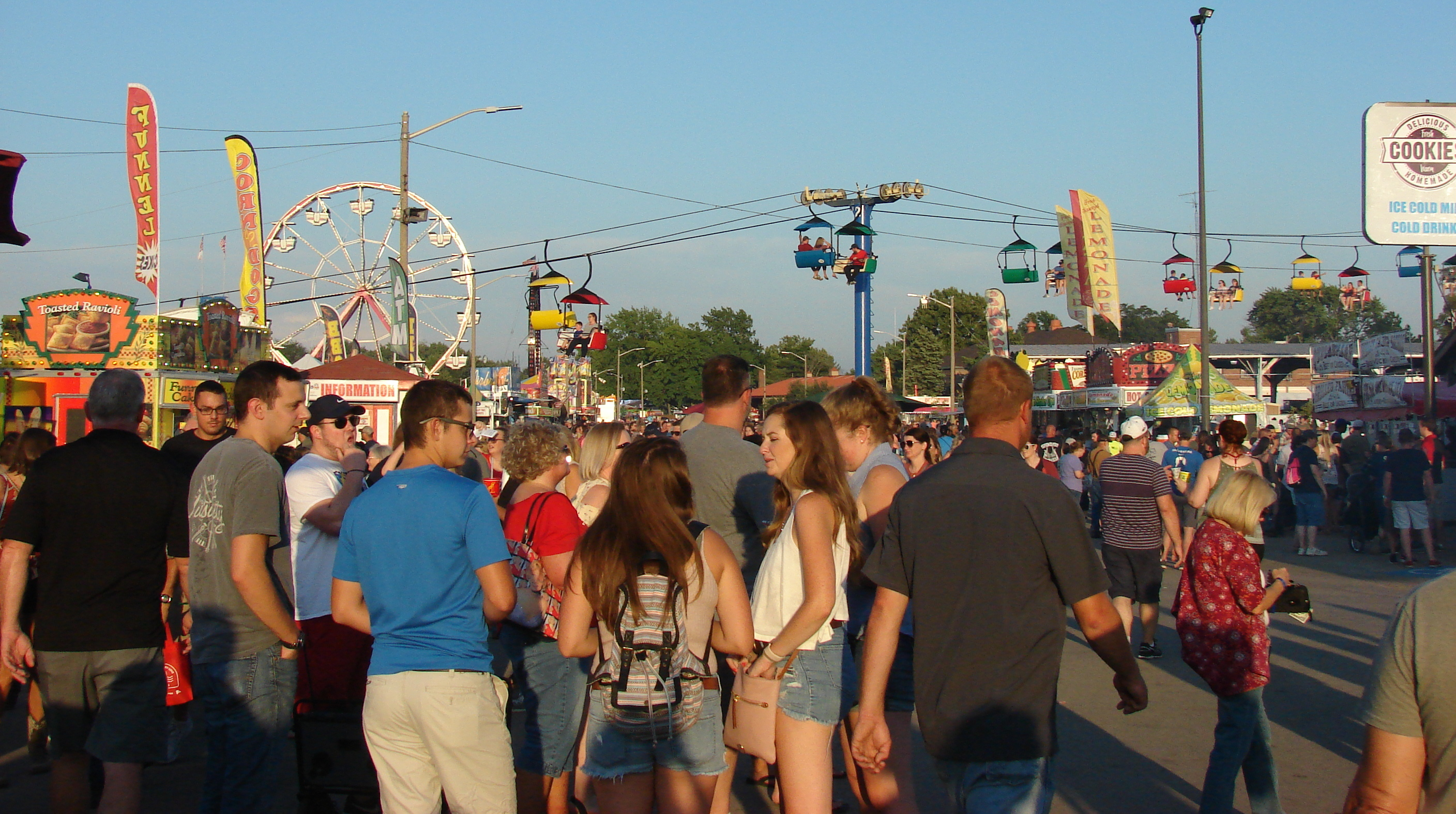
The Illinois State Fair in 2019

Starting with the end of World War II, the growth of productivity in agriculture began to reduce the number of jobs in American farming, both as a percentage of total population and in absolute numbers. State fairs began to transition themselves from agricultural trade shows to entertainment operations.

In Illinois, the State Fair Grandstand, originally built as a place to watch harness racing (and still used for that purpose as of 2022) became a venue for concerts and recitals. The "state fair circuit" became a recognized part of the overall live-music industry for many performers, especially but not exclusively in country music. Noted concerts held at The Grandstand include The Who, performing as an opening act for The Association in 1968.

Agricultural show operations, competitions, and judging continued in Springfield, but many State Fairgoers in 2021 were attending the fair to watch parades and spectacles, enjoy the festival rides, listen to music, or drink beer in one of numerous "beer tents."

The Illinois State Fairgrounds now contains more than 100 permanent buildings. In addition, participants set up countless pavilions and trailers during the period the State Fair is in operation. The Illinois State Fair is operated by the Illinois Department of Agriculture, which states in the state's official "Illinois Blue Book" that the purpose of the State Fair is to "showcase Illinois agriculture and offer wholesome family entertainment."

The Illinois State Fairgrounds are also used as a venue for other competitive and entertainment operations throughout the year, such as motorcycle and car racing, horse shows, and rodeos.

Reported attendance at the Illinois State Fair was approximately 650,000 in 2003, 671,333 in 2004, 672,615 in 2005, approximately 705,000 in 2006, 737,052 in 2008, 918,435 in 2012, and 961,142 in 2013. After a change in attendance count methodology, reported State Fair attendance dropped sharply. Attendees totaled 411,547 in 2015, 347,855 in 2016, 401,648 in 2017, and 369,144 in 2018. In 2019, attendance at the Illinois State Fair reversed declining trends with 509,000 fairgoers and record revenues. Headlining entertainment acts included Snoop Dogg and Reba McEntire.

The 2020 state fair was reduced as a safety measure during the COVID-19 pandemic in Illinois, the main shows were removed, the first cancellation since World War II. The agricultural and motorsport events were moved to September and early October. The animal shows were repurposed as the Junior Livestock Expo held in September, while the Allen Crowe 100 and Bettenhausen 100 races on the State Fair were held in October.

State fair attendance recovered after the pandemic, with 723,079 attendees counted in August 2025.

== Cultural references ==
The Illinois State Fair played a key role in the popularization of the corn dog, starting in 1946.

The fair has long been noted for its annual butter cow, a life-size animal formed of pure butter applied to an armature by a sculptor wielding an oversized palette knife. Among the butter cow's more ironic admirers was author David Foster Wallace, who covered the 1993 Illinois State Fair for Harper's; his report on the yellow bovine, and other Fair sights, is reprinted in A Supposedly Fun Thing I'll Never Do Again (1997).

The Illinois State Fair was featured on the NBC-TV show The Great American Road Trip in July 2009.
