= Boulder City Conservation Easement =

Conservation easement in Boulder City, Nevada

Coordinates: 35.52°N 115.01°W

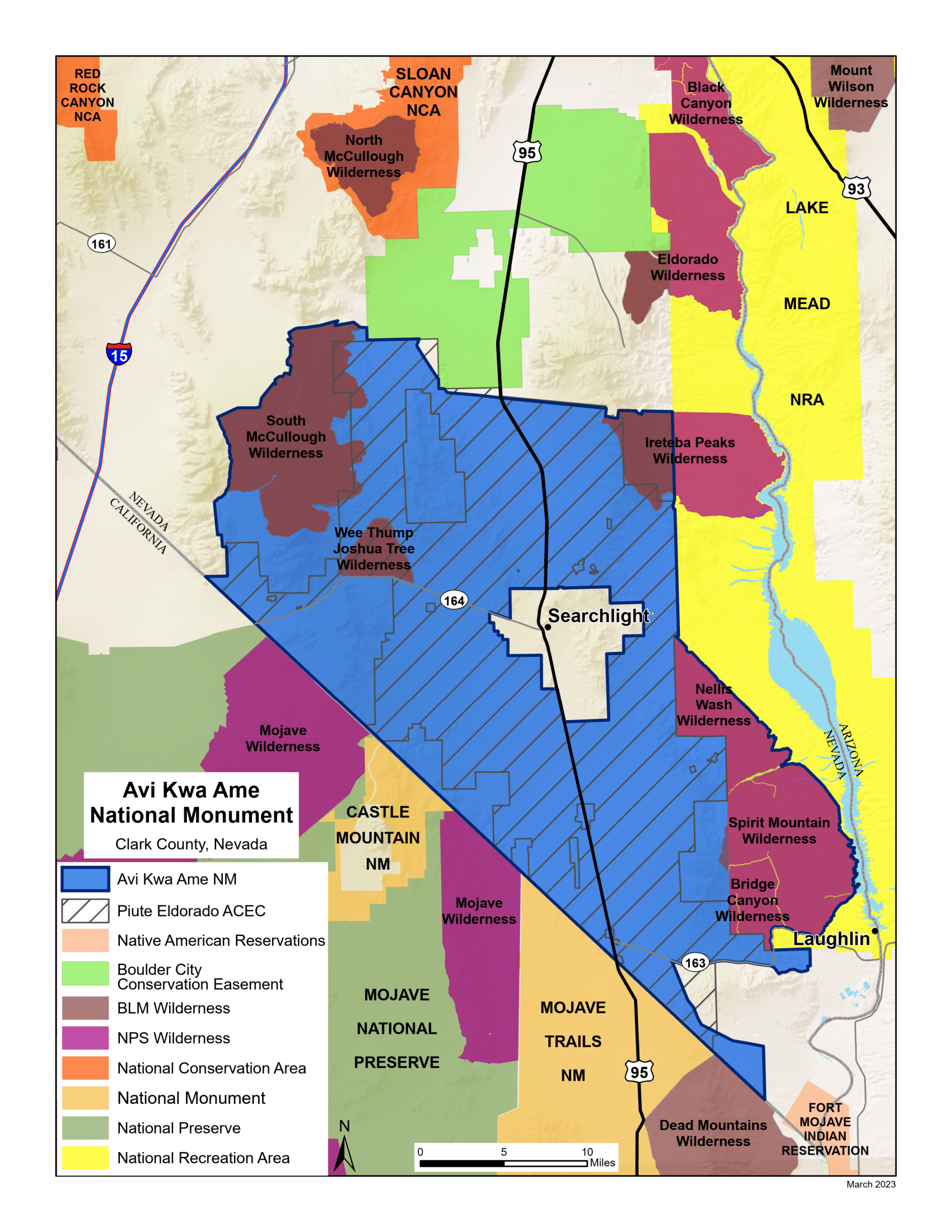
Map of the Boulder City Conservation Easement (in green on the map) and other protected areas

The Boulder City Conservation Easement (BCCE) is a conservation easement located in Boulder City in Clark County in southwestern Nevada. It was designated in 1995 with an area of 86,538 acres to protect the Desert tortoise and other desert species. In 2018, at the request of the Boulder City Council, the boundaries of the BCCE were amended to include additional land adjacent to the Sloan Canyon National Conservation Area and exclude land immediately south of the original solar energy area. This change increased the city's conservation area by 2.2 percent and made nearly 2,000 more acres available for solar energy development. The Boulder City Conservation Easement includes land owned by the City of Boulder City. The City of Boulder is responsible for permitting activities under city ordinances, while Clark County is responsible for law enforcement and management of the BCCE. The BCCE may only be traveled on specifically authorized trails. In 1995, a 50-year contract was signed with Clark County for the BCCE. The Boulder City Conservation Easement Management Plan was created for the conservation area.

== Geography ==
The BCCE is located within the city limits of Boulder City. It begins approximately 2 miles south and west of the residential area of Boulder City, or beginning approximately 2 miles south of the intersection of U.S. Highway 95 and Interstate 11, and extends for approximately 22 miles along U.S. Highway 95. The BCCE is divided by U.S. 95 into a northern section, which encompasses 39,114 acres, and a southern section, which encompasses 48,154 acres. Excluded from the southern section is the Energy Zone, an area of 3,064 acres designated by the city for energy development.

The BCCE borders the Sloan Canyon National Conservation Area to the northwest, the Lake Mead National Recreation Area to the east, and the Avi Kwa Ame National Monument to the south, and with other protected areas in California forms a much larger contiguous protected area system in the Mojave Desert. Bureau of Land Management (BLM), National Park Service (NPS), and private lands also border the Easement. The BCCE land is marked with restricted use signs in green lettering with the Boulder City and Desert Conservation Programm logos.

== Animal and plant species in the protected area ==
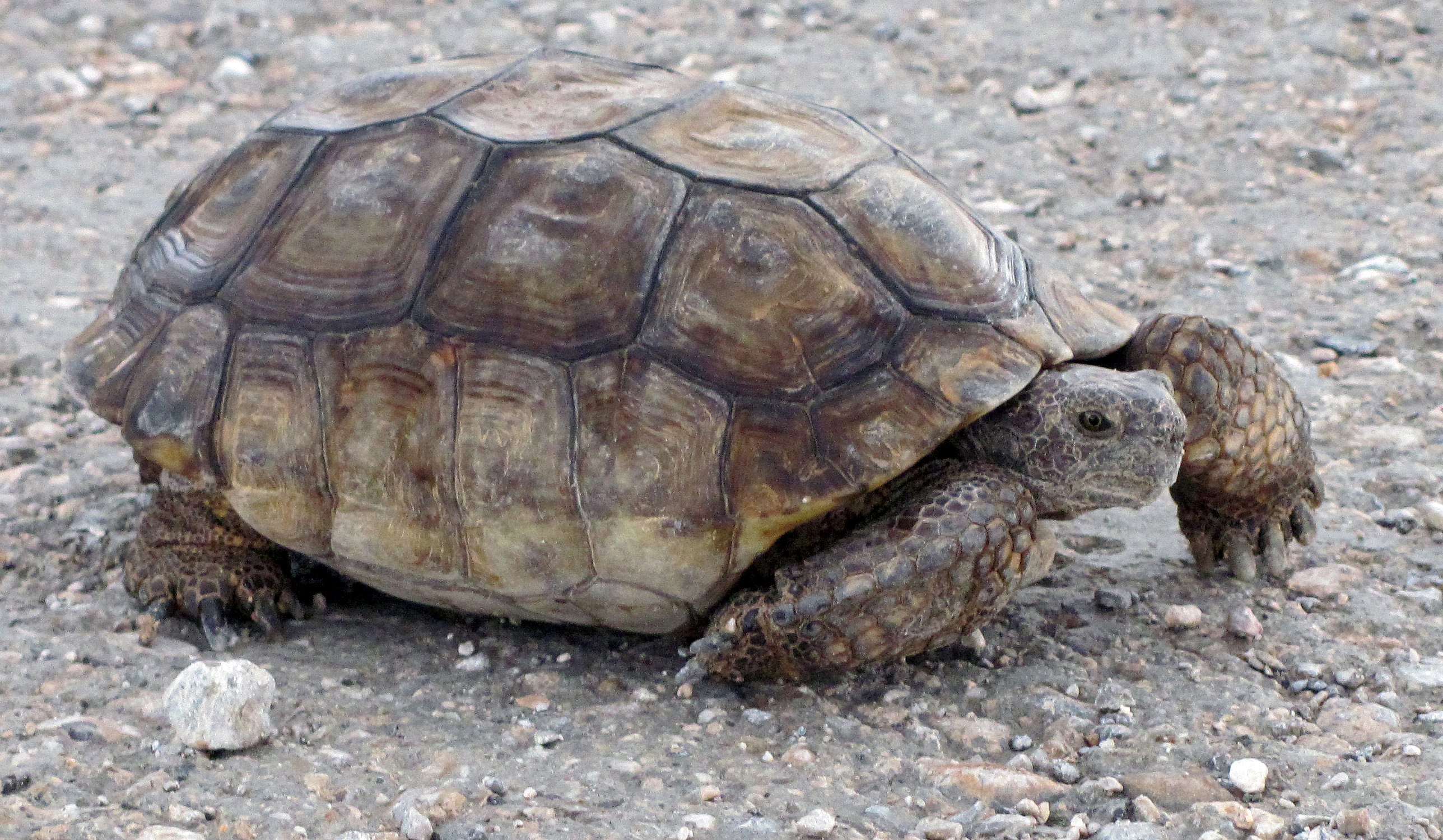
Desert tortoise

The United States Fish and Wildlife Service and Clark County Desert Conservation Program conducted translocations for the California gopher tortoise from 2014 to 2019. The translocated Desert tortoises came from the Desert Tortoise Conservation Center (2014 only) and locations from the wild.

Bird species such as Ferruginous hawk, Burrowing owl, Loggerhead shrike, Phainopepla, LeConte's thrasher and Bell's vireo occur in the preserve.

Mammals include species such as kit fox. Other animal species include California kingsnake, speckled rattlesnake, Gila monster, Zebra-tailed lizard, Mojave rattlesnake, Long-nosed leopard lizard and desert iguana.

The cactus Ferocactus cylindraceus occurs.
