= Reno Collier =

American comedian

- Born: United States
- Occupation: Comedian

Reno Collier is a stand up comedian who gained celebrity as the opening act for Larry the Cable Guy and with his own Comedy Central Presents special. He was also featured as a roaster for the Comedy Central Roast of Larry the Cable Guy. Collier was featured on the Blue Collar Comedy Tour: The Next Generation.

Reno Collier is a graduate of Fishburne Military School in Waynesboro, Virginia. Reno was on the football team. He provided hours of comic relief on his many hours of tours in the front parapet of the school. He received his undergraduate degree from Elon College (now Elon University) in North Carolina. He has two children, Em and Gatlin, and lives in Murfreesboro, Tennessee.

In July 2009, Collier hosted The Great American Road Trip on NBC. He was the host of the new Animal Planet reality competition show Top Hooker.

Collier is a former alcoholic.
