= Boulder Dam Hotel =

- U.S. National Register of Historic Places
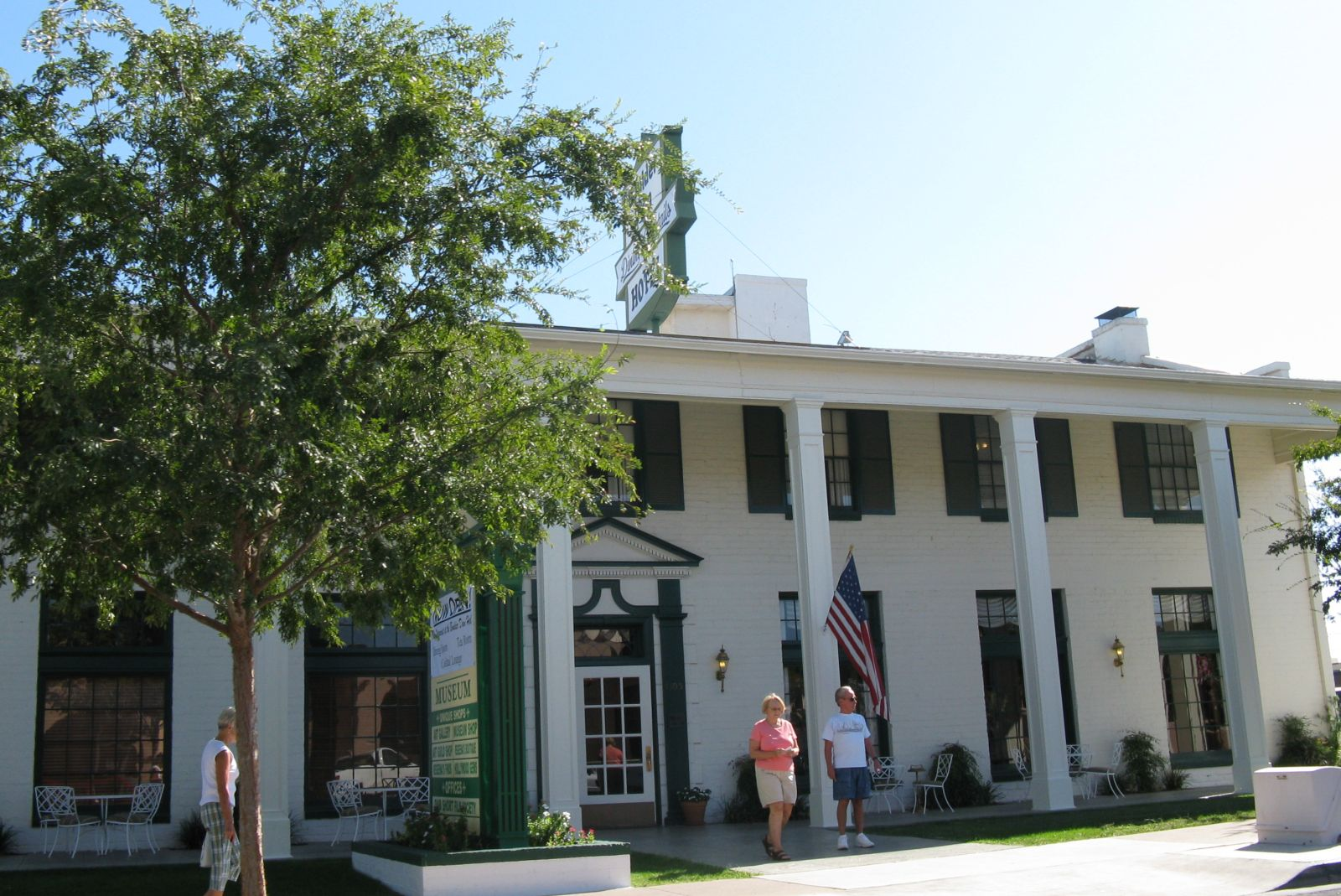

- Location within Nevada Location within the United States
- Location: 1305 Arizona St., Boulder City, Nevada
- Coordinates: 35°58′39″N 114°50′11″W
- Built: 1933
- Architect: Webb, P.S.; Webb Construction
- Architectural style: Colonial Revival
- NRHP reference No.: 82003210
- Added to NRHP: July 13, 1982

The Boulder Dam Hotel, also known as the Boulder City Inn, is a hotel located in Boulder City, Nevada that is listed on the United States National Register of Historic Places. It was designed in the Colonial Revival style by architect Henry Smith. The hotel was built to accommodate official visitors and tourists during the building of Boulder Dam, now Hoover Dam.

The restored hotel is still operating with 22 rooms available.

== Boulder City/Hoover Dam Museum ==
The Boulder City/Hoover Dam Museum is located in the hotel. Operated by the Boulder City Museum and Historical Association, the museum features exhibits about the Boulder Canyon Project, the building of Boulder Dam, and the history and culture of Boulder City.

== History ==
The hotel was built for W.F. Grey, who saw the opportunity for a hotel in the "government town" of Boulder City. The hotel was completed in 1933. P.S. Webb built the hotel and purchased it from Grey in 1935 as part of his tourist agency. Webb advertised heavily, turning the hotel into a destination resort. Webb sold the property during World War II, as the tourist business had declined precipitously.

Originally built in a U-shaped configuration, wings were added in 1935 to make it H-shaped. The two-story building is built of concrete block. The north elevation, the entry, is fronted by a two-story porch with square columns.

The hotel has seen a number of celebrity visitors, including Boris Karloff, Shirley Temple and then-Crown Prince Olav and Princess Martha of Norway. The hotel was listed on the National Register of Historic Places on July 13, 1982.

The Boulder Dam Hotel Association purchased the hotel in 1993 and spent over $2 million to restore it. During the restoration, the number of rooms was reduced from 83 to allow for more public spaces.

Major renovations were completed in the early 2000s allowing the hotel to reopen.
