= Boulder City Hospital =

Geography
- Location: 901 Adams Boulevard; Boulder City, Clark County, Nevada, U.S.

Organisation
- Care system: Private
- Type: General and Teaching
- Affiliated university: University of Nevada, Reno School of Medicine (1969–2017); UNLV School of Medicine (2017–present)

Services
- Standards: Joint Commission
- Emergency department: Yes
- Beds: 82

Helipads
- Helipad: Yes

History
- Founded: November 15, 1931; 94 years ago

Links
- Website: bchcares.org

- Old Boulder City Hospital
- Formerly listed on the U.S. National Register of Historic Places
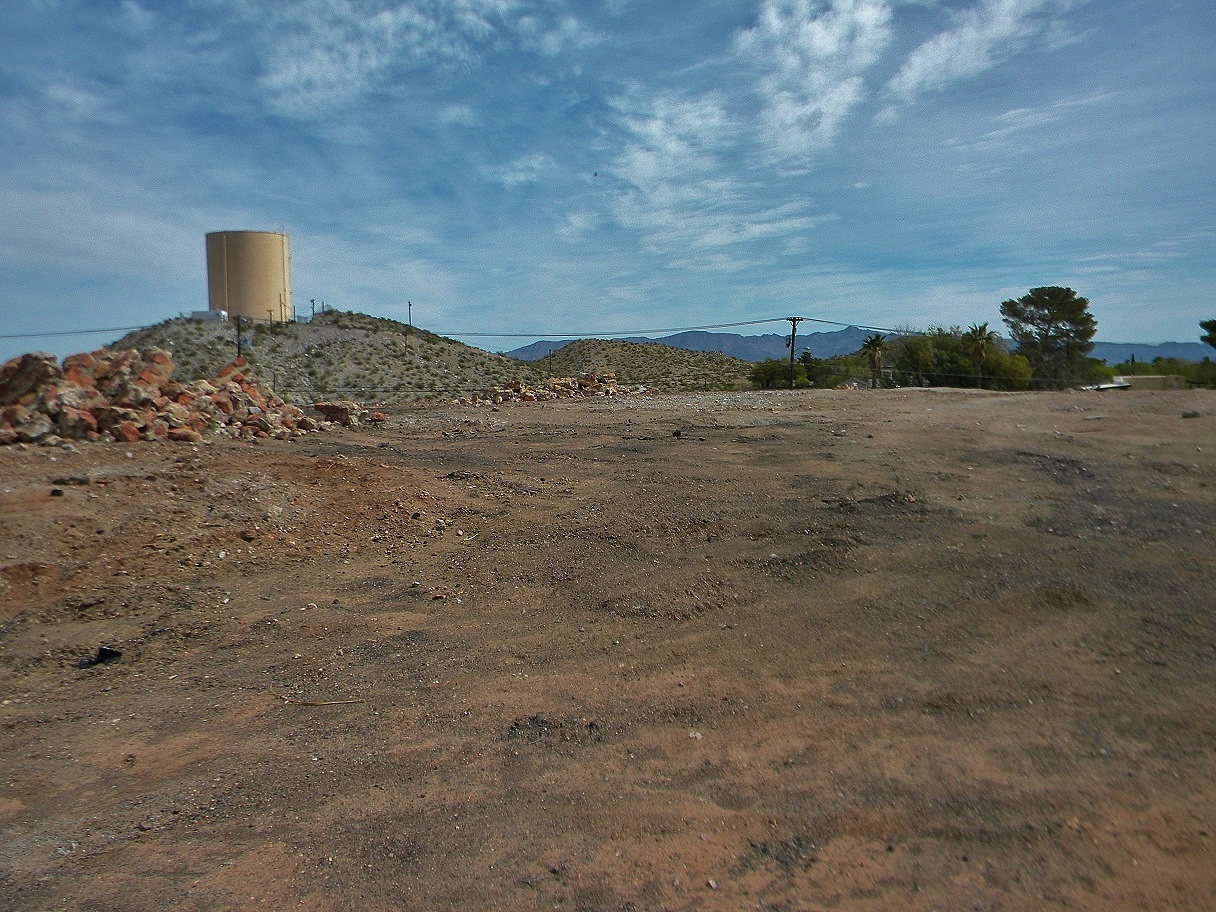
- Site of the old hospital

- Location within Nevada Location within the United States
- Location: 701 Park Place; Boulder City, Nevada, U.S.
- Coordinates: 35°58′45″N 114°49′51″W
- Built: November 15, 1931; 94 years ago
- Architect: Six Companies
- NRHP reference No.: 82003211

Significant dates
- Added to NRHP: April 1, 1982; 44 years ago
- Removed from NRHP: June 9, 2023

Boulder City Hospital is an 82-bed facility (including 25 acute care/swing beds), a 47-bed long-term care facility, and a 10-bed Geriatric Behavioral Medicine Center.

== History ==
Built by Six Companies while the company was building the Hoover Dam, the hospital opened on November 15, 1931 with 20 beds. The hospital closed in 1935 when the dam was finished. Later in 1943, the hospital reopened. The old hospital building was abandoned when a new building for the hospital opened on December 8, 1973, a mile southwest on the southeast corner of Adams Boulevard and Buchanan Boulevard. Despite subsequently serving as a charity retreat home, it was ultimately demolished in late 2015; the old hospital site was listed on the National Register of Historic Places.

=== The Beginning ===
Boulder City's first hospital was built by Six Companies, the joint venture responsible for building Hoover Dam. The U.S. Public Health Service, the government agency that would have been responsible for maintaining health in the dam town, couldn't afford to build a hospital. A second government agency, the Bureau of Reclamation, felt since the majority of workers on the project were employed by Six Companies, it was the companies’ responsibility to build and maintain a hospital. The government worked out an arrangement by which Bureau employees could also use the hospital.

The hospital site was the top of Block 8, a hill on the northeast side of town originally reserved for a resort hotel. The view from the hospital was magnificent: the Eldorado Valley and McCullough Mountains to the south, and to the north the Colorado River wound lazily through its bed. Construction began in August 1931, and the hospital was opened November 15, 1931. The cost of the original Boulder City Hospital was $20,000.

The hospital was built of brick and white stucco, and the L-shaped building housed 20 beds and a special orthopedic ward. The Pest House, an eight-bed isolation facility for contagious diseases, was maintained away from the main hospital building. In 1933, a wing was added to the hospital as an isolation ward and the Pest House was torn down.

Six Companies employees were charged $1.50 per month health fee through payroll deduction which entitled them, but not their families, to services at Boulder City Hospital. Family members of the dam workers were forced to travel to Las Vegas for care.

When the dam was finished in 1935 and the Six Companies left Boulder, the hospital was closed. Those needing medical care went to Las Vegas. In some emergency cases, the time to travel into town proved fatal. In 1938, the National Park Service assumed responsibility for the hospital building and turned it into a museum and office. The Park Service left the building in 1941 and the building remained vacant for two years.

=== War Years and Citizen Patrol ===
In December 1943, the U.S. Public Health Service reopened the hospital to care for war wounded. While the Bureau of Reclamation wanted to build a new hospital and had the money, building materials were unavailable. The Bureau simply remodeled the old hospital and signed a memorandum of agreement with the Health Service, providers of refurbished equipment to the hospital. Town residents cleaned and repaired the second-hand x-ray machines, sterilizers, beds and other items that came from hospitals around the country.

Town residents also donated money for an ambulance and organized a volunteer ambulance corps. Subscription to this service was $15 per year. Membership entitled the bearer to one ride to the hospital.

In 1949, the Bureau of Reclamation took control of the hospital which continuously lost money. The hospital served the city well enough but it proved to be a financial drain on the government. In 1954, with no forewarning, the Bureau dumped the hospital. If Boulder City wanted a hospital, it had to raise $15,000 in two weeks to cover operating expenses and maintenance. The townspeople rallied and began a door-to-door fundraising campaign called ‘Save the Hospital’ on February 25, 1954. By March 18 the fund surpassed $15,000 and the hospital was turned over to citizen control on April 15, 1954.

=== Boulder City Hospital Auxiliary and Beyond ===
The Boulder City Hospital Auxiliary was formed by local women to help with hospital work and to raise money to finance operation of the hospital. In 1963, a fund-raising effort was started by the Auxiliary and has since become a Boulder institution. This was the Boulder City Hospital Auxiliary art festival, Art in the Park. The first festival brought in $3,000 and involved fifty artists, including James Swinnerton.

On December 8, 1973, a new Boulder City Hospital located on Adams Boulevard opened its doors. The old Six Companies Hospital on the hill fell into disrepair and was condemned. The Sisters of Charity bought the building in 1976 and began renovation in 1980, turning the hospital into a retreat house known as Wellspring. The building was dedicated on April 5, 1981, and a year later it was listed on the National Register of Historic Places.
