= Top Hooker =

- Genre: Reality competition
- Created by: Craig Piligian
- Presented by: Reno Collier
- Country of origin: United States
- Original language: English
- No. of seasons: 1
- No. of episodes: 8

Production
- Executive producers: Craig Piligian; Keith Hoffman; Mitch Rosa; Ralph Wikke
- Running time: 40 to 43 minutes
- Production company: Pilgrim Studios

Original release
- Network: Animal Planet
- Release: June 2 – July 21, 2013

Top Hooker is an American reality fishing competition television series that premiered June 2, 2013 on Animal Planet. As of June 2013, casting for a second season is taking place.

== Cast ==
=== Season 1 ===
- Larysa Switlyk
- Dzifa Glymin
- Greg Mcnamara
- Kevin Vendituoli
- Patrick Crawford – Winner
- Danny De Vries
- Chris Wright
- Ian Esterhuizen
- Melanie Housh
- Attila Agh

== Episodes ==
Season	Episodes	Originally released	
Season	Episodes	First released	Last released
1	8	June 2, 2013	July 21, 2013

=== Season 1 (2013) ===
No. overall	No. in season	Title	Original release date	U.S. viewers (millions)
1	1	"The Oldest Profession"	June 2, 2013	1.18
2	2	"Wave Riders"	June 9, 2013	0.78
3	3	"River Rumble"	June 16, 2013	0.47
4	4	"Who's Got the Smallest?"	June 23, 2013	0.86
5	5	"Squaring Off"	June 30, 2013	0.89
6	6	"Walking on Water"	July 7, 2013	1.09
7	7	"The Final Four"	July 14, 2013	0.99
8	8	"High-Seas Showdown"	July 21, 2013	1.00

== Reception ==
Andy Dehnart from Reality Blurred said a comment at the beginning of premiere episode almost lost him. Melissa Camacho of Common Sense Media gave the show a 3 out of 5 stars.
