= Hemenway Park =

Park in Boulder City, Nevada, US

- Hemenway Valley Park
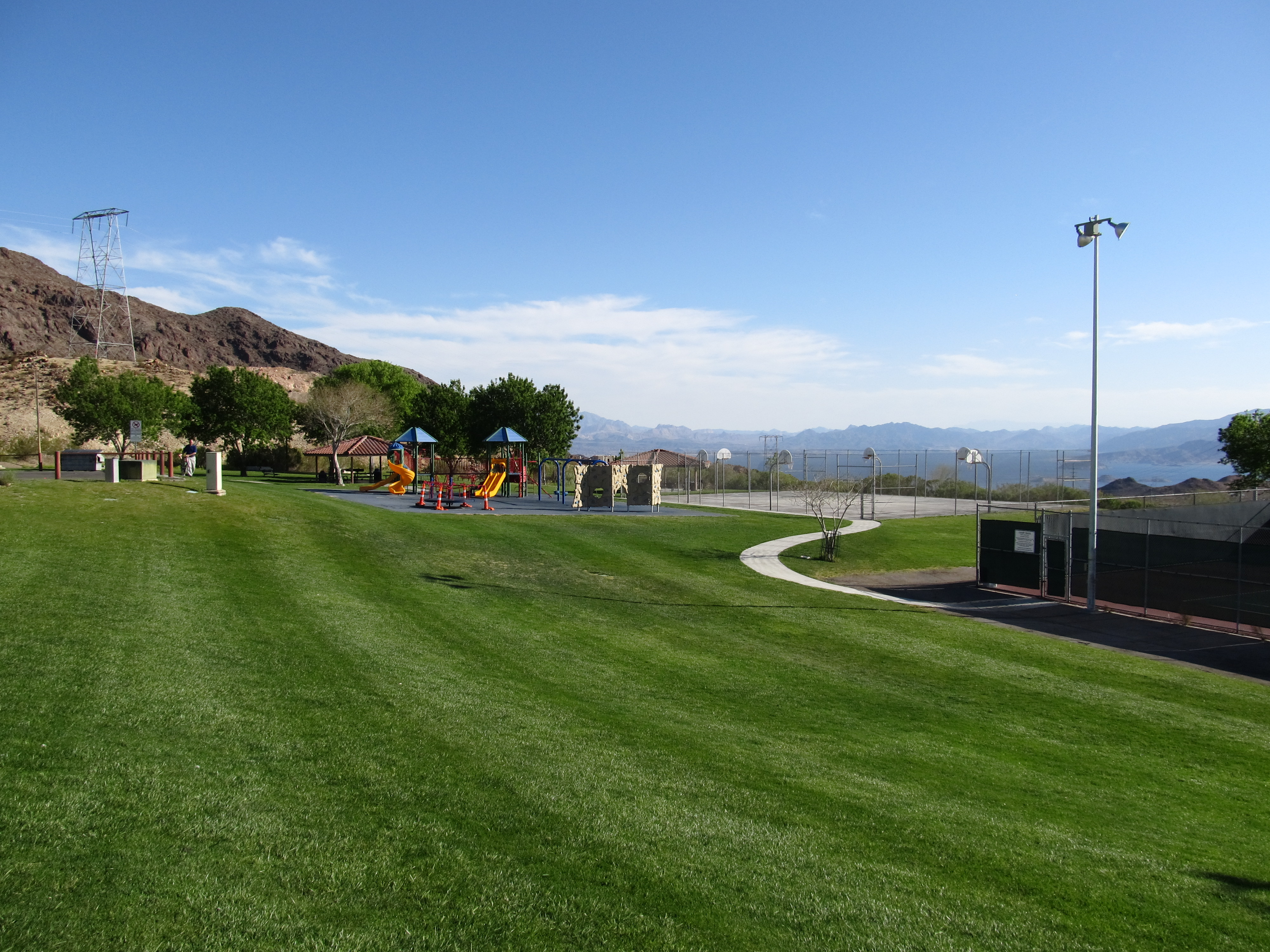
- Hemenway Park's playground and basketball court in 2012. The River Mountains are in the background.
- Interactive map of Hemenway Park
- Location: 401 Ville Drive, Boulder City, Nevada, United States
- Coordinates: 35°59′44″N 114°49′53″W
- Created: 1984
- Owner: City of Boulder City
- Status: Open
- Website: www.bcnv.org/facilities/facility/details/hemenwayvalleypark-10

Hemenway Park (also known as Hemenway Valley Park) is a park in Boulder City, Nevada, United States. Opened in 1984, the park hosts community gatherings and sports events. It is equipped with tennis courts, basketball courts, a softball field, horseshoe throwing areas, picnic spots, gazebos, and a playground.

Desert bighorn sheep frequent the park between April and October. They climb down from the River Mountains to eat the readily available supply of grass and to get hydrated from the park's irrigation sprinklers. Since 2013 the sheep have been infected with pneumonia which has caused the number of sheep visiting the park to drop to 50 from 60 in 2023. The animals attract tourists and photographers to the park, including those on tour buses bound for Lake Mead and the Grand Canyon. The sheep are not always at the park, so to reduce inquiries about whether they were there, the city installed the Ram Cam in 2023. The Ram Cam provides a live-streamed view of the park for 24 hours a day on YouTube.

== Name ==
Multiple academics in the region have tried to identify the source of the park's Hemenway name, but their efforts have been unsuccessful. Christie Vanover, a Lake Mead National Recreation Area spokeswoman, discovered that a geography book published in 1909 makes the oldest documented reference to the name. The book discusses Hemenway Pass, which has a copper camp. In 2015, the Las Vegas Review-Journal journalist Henry Brean said that researchers had narrowed the source down to two likely contenders. The first contender is Mary Hemenway, an affluent widow in New England. Although she did not travel to the region, she funded Hemenway Southwestern Archaeological Expedition, which took place between 1886 and 1894. Focusing on locations in New Mexico and Southern Arizona, the exploration started in Albuquerque. However, a person in the party could have reached present-day Clark County, Nevada, where Hemenway Park is located, by traveling northwest along the Colorado River.

Christie Vanover, the Lake Mead National Recreation Area spokeswoman, proposed an alternative theory involving Frank Hampton Cushing, the exploration team's commander, who had previously been in the employ of John Wesley Powell, a well-known explorer. Cushing may have convinced Powell, who surveyed and assigned names to the area's landmarks, to assign Mary Hemenway's name to a valley or washland to acknowledge her benevolence. Mark Hall-Patton, the Clark County Museum administrator, proposed a second theory involving Luther S. Hemenway, a Mormon pioneer. He suggested that Hemenway, a grower of wine grapes near St. George, possibly was connected to Daniel Bonelli, after whom various landmarks are named. However, Hall-Patton did not find proof showing that Hemenway visited the locations that bear his surname or that Bonelli chose to name landmarks after Hemenway. According to Hall-Patton, it is frequently the case that people do not know a name's source. The population was very small in the 19th century. Since many people had departed or died after having lived there for a brief period, no one might know who or what a place was named for.

== History, location and amenities ==
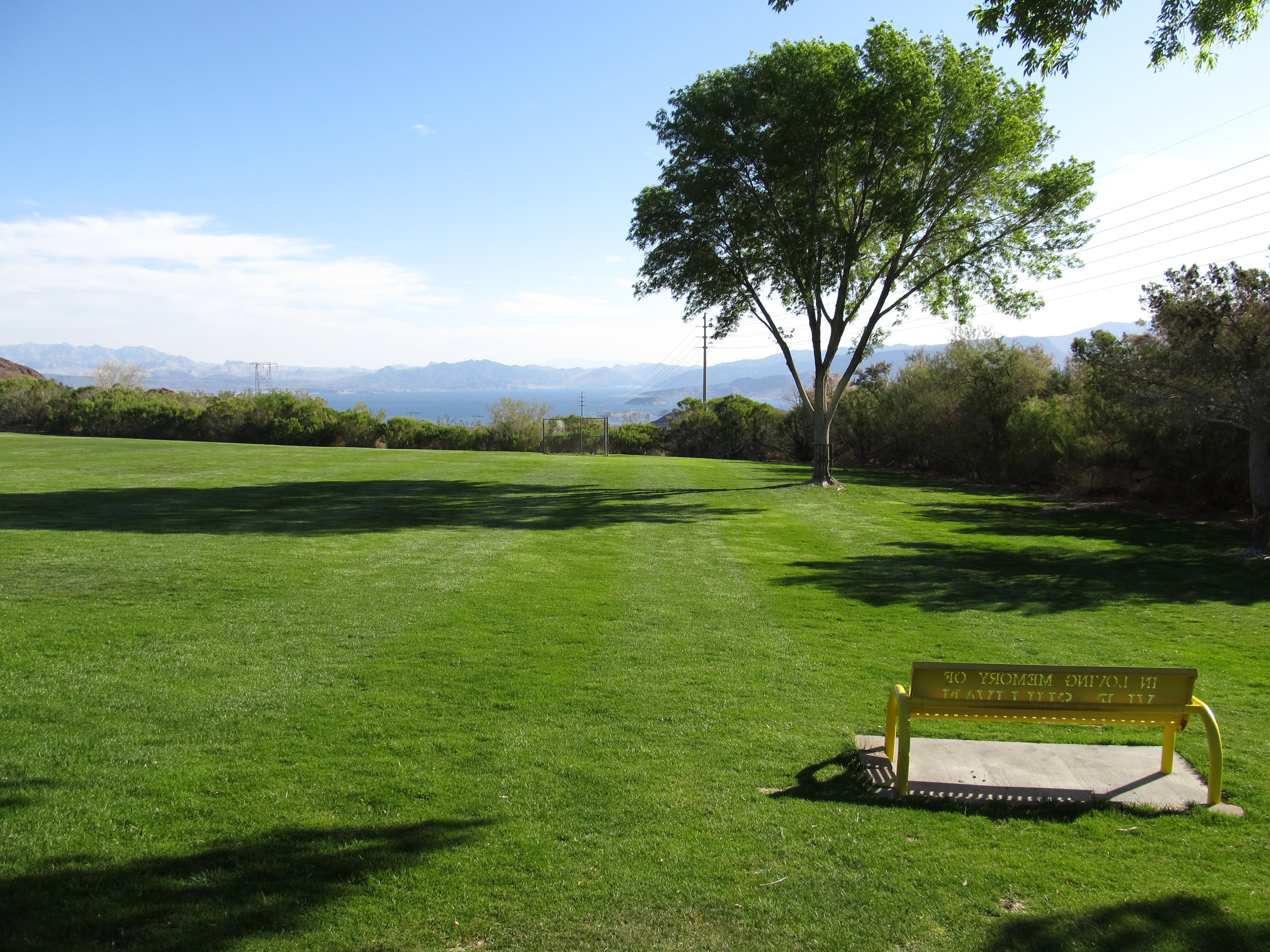
A bench at the park in 2012

Hemenway Park began operating in 1984. The park is located at 401 Ville Drive in northern Boulder City, Nevada, and is 10 acres (4 ha). Visitors can see Lake Mead, which is situated 5 mi (8 km) away. It is about a mile from Boulder City Parkway (known as U.S. Route 93 Business) and two blocks from the route's intersection with Ville Street. It is close to the River Mountain Hiking Trail. At the park, perched at the hill's summit is the Administration Building. Built in 1932, it is the United States Bureau of Reclamation's regional base.

The park has two tennis courts, a softball field, two horseshoe throwing areas, two picnic spots equipped with barbeque grills, gazebos, and a playground. It has signs informing visitors that dogs are not allowed in the park, in accordance with a city ordinance put in place to protect the sheep that frequent the area. The Nevada Department of Wildlife installed six educational displays in 2014 discussing the desert bighorn sheep that frequent the park. The panels educate readers about the sheep's biology and history. James B. Gibson, a Clark County Commissioner, secured $175,000 in funding in 2020 to renovate the park. The joint-use deal between the county and the city tapped money from the former's upgrade budget for parks and recreation. The grant paid for benches and watering systems. It supported the creation of a walking path to keep tourists on the park's edges, helping preserve its center for the sheep. It funded signs that provided information about the sheep and the desert plants. Around 2023, the park received upgrades such as the refurbishment of the damaged basketball court and the installation of a Whirly Q Spinner in place of a damaged playground piece. The city installed two swings, including one that is accessible.

== Events ==
Hemenway Park has been used for community gatherings centered on the sheep. When the park's sheep suffered from pneumonia in 2013, the pastor of the Boulder City United Methodist Church visited the park to host a gathering involving praying and reiki healing. It was the site of Artful Arty's Kids Drawing Day, an event put on in 2016 by the Boulder City Art Guild. The aim was to allow elementary school students to draw bighorn sheep in real time. The Nevada Department of Wildlife led lessons there in 2017 to educate the public about the sheep. Beginning in 1988, the Boulder City Interfaith Lay Council has put on a yearly non-denominational Easter Sunrise Service at the park. Over 200 people attended the service in 2025. The park hosts sports events including cross country running, and softball.

== Sheep ==
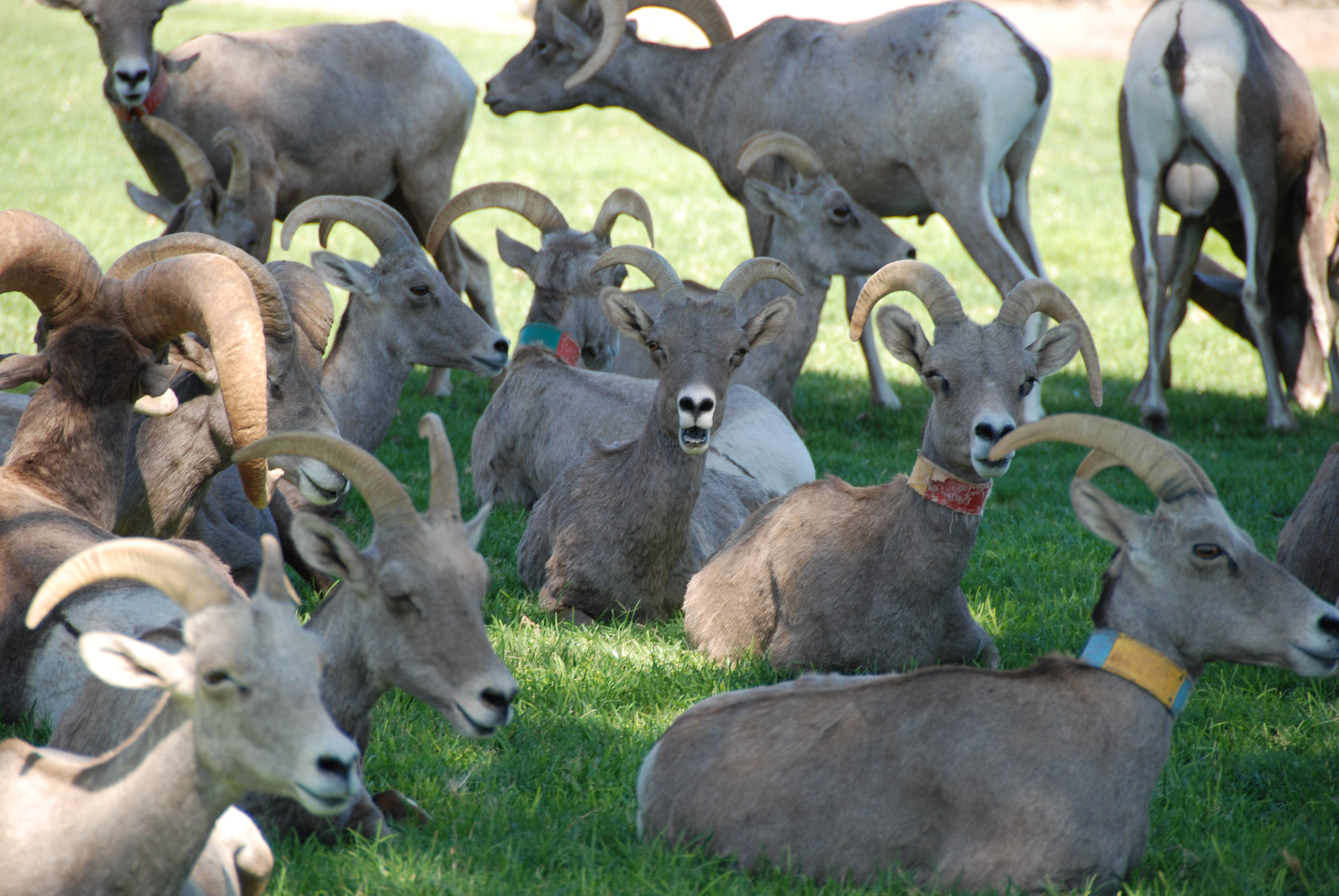
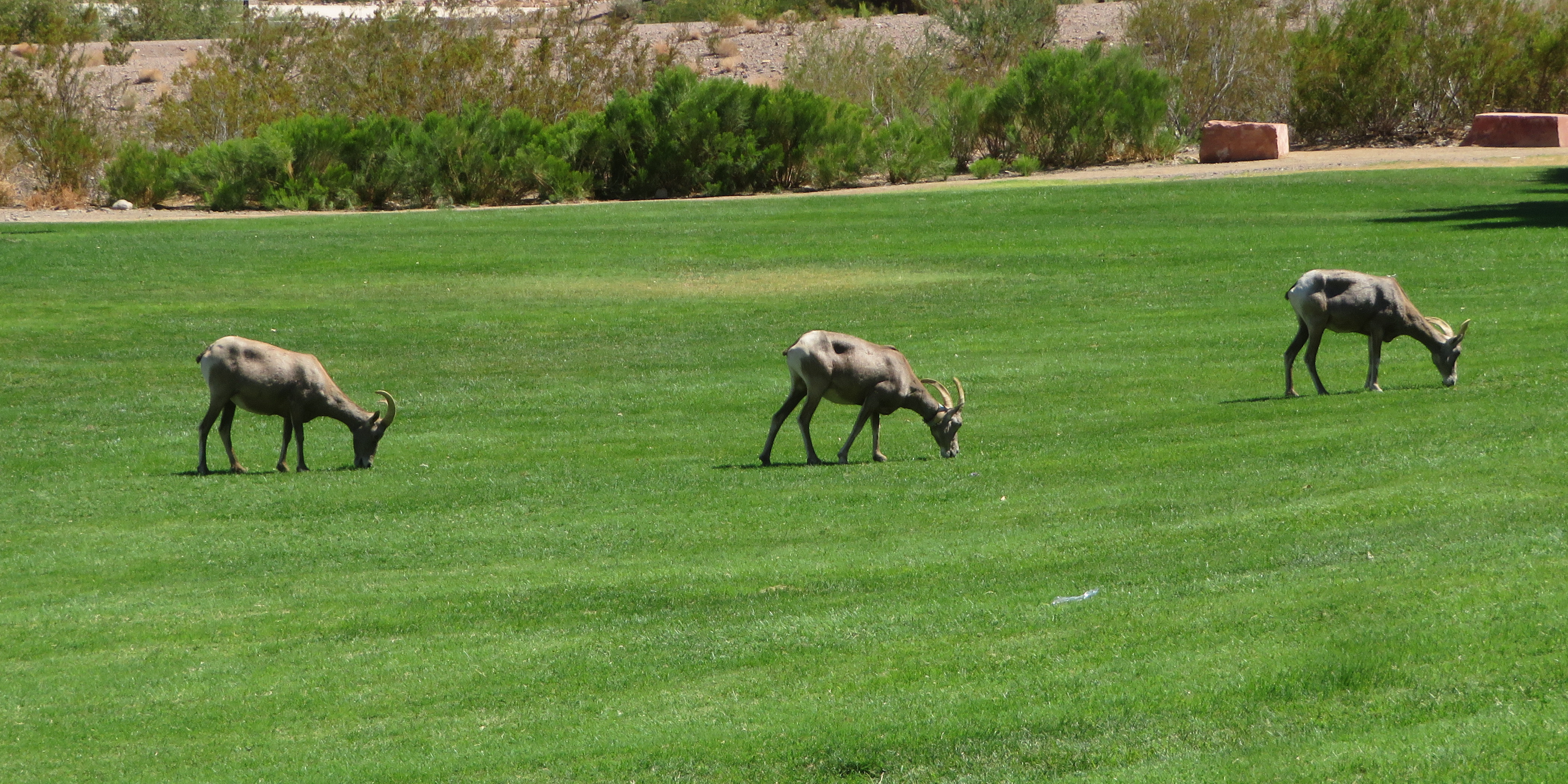
At left, desert bighorn sheep sitting down. At right, desert bighorn sheep grazing.

Desert bighorn sheep are Nevada's state animal. Roughly six months into Hemenway Park's 1984 opening, the sheep began visiting the park. In 2012, there were between 200 and 250 adult members of a bighorn sheep herd that lived in the River Mountains. Around a third of the sheep frequently visited Hemenway Park for grazing. Biologists in 2013 noticed that the park's sheep had symptoms of runny noses and coughs. Workers from the Nevada Department of Wildlife caught a sick ewe to undergo euthanasia so she could be dissected. The officials aimed to use the animal's tissues to determine whether a lethal form of pneumonia had affected the herd. Since bighorn sheep lack immunity to pneumonia, they frequently die in large numbers from it when exposed. The ewe was confirmed to be suffering from pneumonia, so government officials had to stop reintroducing River Mountains animals to other mountain ranges. Since 2013, scientists have identified four distinct strains of the bacterium Mycoplasma ovipneumoniae in the River Mountains sheep. The youngest members of the herd are most at risk of dying since they have immature immune systems that lack the antibodies to defend against bacterial pneumonia, causing the population's reduction. sheep contract pneumonia more easily during mating season as the rams (male sheep) make trips exceeding 100 miles in both directions to find ewes (female sheep). The number of sheep in the River Mountains grew to nearly 300 in 2015 but dropped to about 180 in 2023 owing to pneumonia. Previously, about 100 sheep went to the park but by 2023 the upper limit topped out at 50 to 60 sheep.

Since the Las Vegas Valley typically has over 200 days without rainfall, many bighorn sheep in the area are in danger of dying from drought. While the bighorn sheep at Muddy Mountains, Arrow Canyon Range, McCullough Range, and Spotted Range face the greatest danger, the sheep from River Mountains that visit Hemenway Park are not in danger. This is primarily due to how close they are to Lake Mead, allowing them grazing opportunities throughout the year. Each year throughout the warmest six months between April and October, the mountain-dwelling sheep visit the park every day, typically beginning their descent as temperatures climb toward 90 °F (30 °C). They generally are at the park starting in the middle of morning and ending as the afternoon draws to a close. The sheep head to the park because readily available water from the park's irrigation sprinklers make life there considerably less challenging compared to mountain life. The mixture of the forbs and grass at the park provide the sheep nutritional variety, while its towering trees offer cover from the desert environment. The end of the fall is the sheep's mating season. To compete for access to mates, the male sheep at the park clash by ramming their horns against each other.

Since at least 1992, the sheep have been relocated to different sites. Beginning in 1997, sheep were transported from the River Mountains, which had an overpopulation of sheep, to the Delamar Mountains. In 2005, state employees planned to relocate roughly 24 young sheep from the park to the Virgin Mountains. The Fraternity of the Desert Bighorn offered to cover the projected $15,000 required to track the animals and $7,000 for relocating the sheep using eight crates. In 2007, 25 sheep were moved, drawn from a herd of over 250. The next year, 50 sheep were transported to Delamar and Meadow Valley Mountains; a state official said the reduction in sheep was driven by grievances over sheep feces and worries about public safety.

Ron Eland, the editor of the Boulder City Review, called the sheep the city's "unofficial mascot". The sheep attract tourists, photographers, wildlife enthusiasts, and locals to visit the park. Tour buses destined for Lake Mead or the Grand Canyon frequently visit Hemenway Park. The city's Parks and Recreation department delivers an annual notice to tour operators that outlines the guidelines on entering the park with groups. The park's sheep have grown used to being around people. They go within close proximity of visitors, who can view them while seated at the park's picnic tables. Sheep grazing in the park come as close as a few feet to visitors. A Nevada Department of Wildlife staff member, Lauren MacLeod, said that people should avoid giving food to the park's sheep since food that does not align with their natural diet could pose serious health risks. MacLeod recommended that to avoid disturbing the sheep, observers should rely on binoculars or their camera's zoom functionality to see the animals without getting too close. The park's proximity to the high-traffic Boulder City Parkway raises the likelihood of sheep-car accidents.

== Ram Cam ==
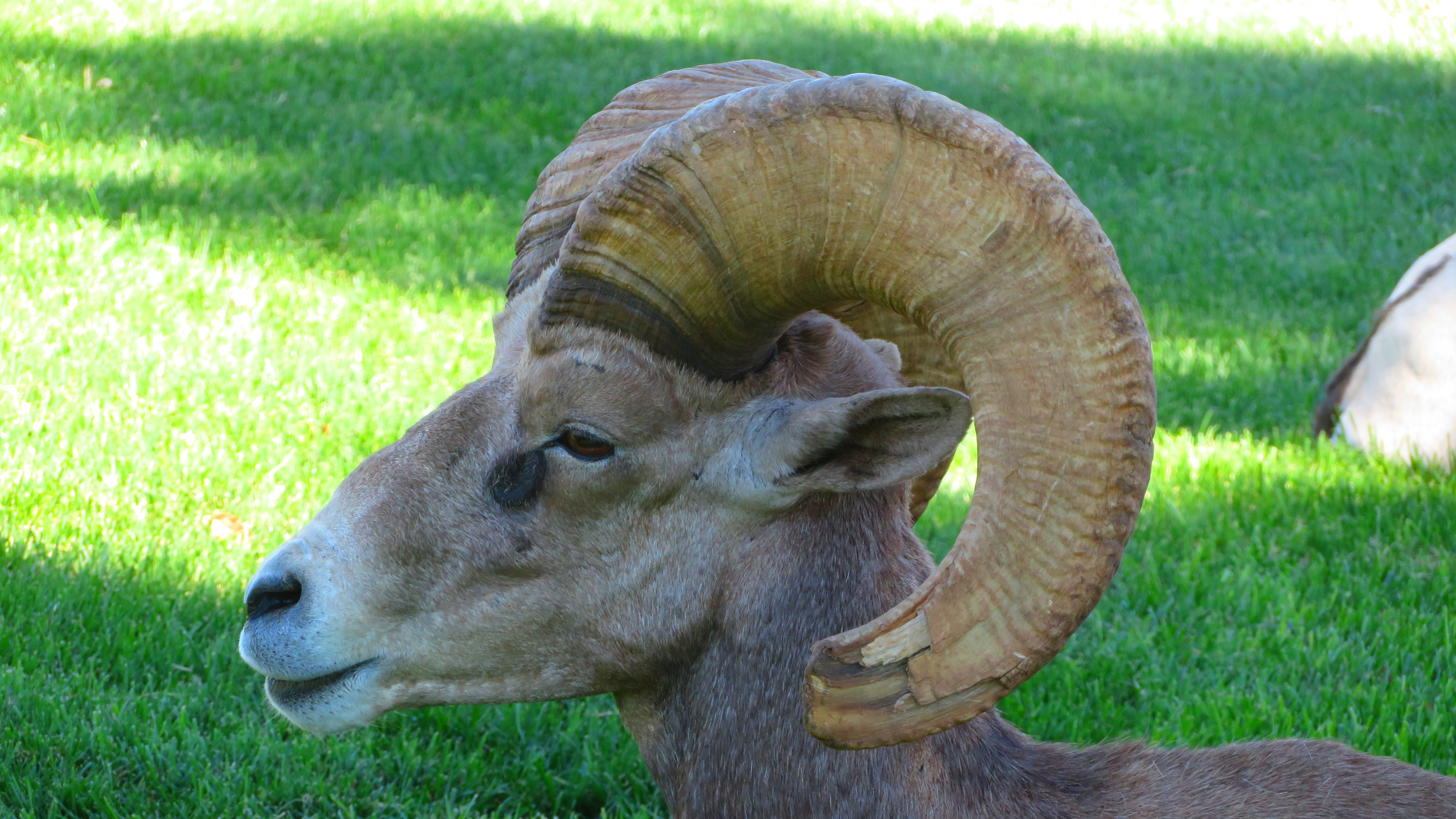
At left, a desert bighorn sheep in 2021. At right, desert bighorn sheep in 2011.

In March 2022, Boulder City Parks and Recreation Director Roger Hall initially proposed having a real-time video stream showing the sheep at Hemenway Park. In the months preceding the installation, the city's employees devised and set up the required technology through collaboration across multiple departments. A challenge that held up the project in February 2023 was not having access to a network connection beyond mobile service, a requirement to stream the video, but the issue was later resolved. The Boulder City government mounted the "Ram Cam", a real-time video broadcast system, on top of the park's restroom facilities and made the stream available to visitors on September 2, 2023. A wide-angle view is captured by the camera. The video stream is broadcast 24 hours a day on YouTube. Paid for through the city's general fund, the government spent a little below $6,000 to purchase the devices.

The animals do not follow a set routine so may be in the park on one day but not there the next day. The cameras were mounted to let people know if the sheep were currently in the park, aiming to reduce calls to the city and the Boulder City Chamber of Commerce from those planning a visit. Another purpose of the cameras was to enable state biologists to monitor the sheep's physical condition in case any had gotten hurt. A year after the cameras were set up, they had been watched over 150,000 times and there was a significant drop in inquiries about the sheep's whereabouts.
