= Farm Home =

Farm Home was a newspaper published monthly in Springfield, Illinois. The articles it published focused largely on livestock production, farming, child-rearing, and household advice. Along with economic sections, there were also personal anecdotes, opinions, and advertisements.

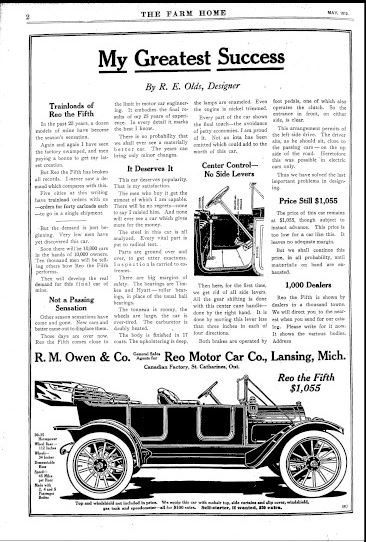
The Farm Home (May 1, 1912)
