= Deanna Brooks =

American glamour model and actress

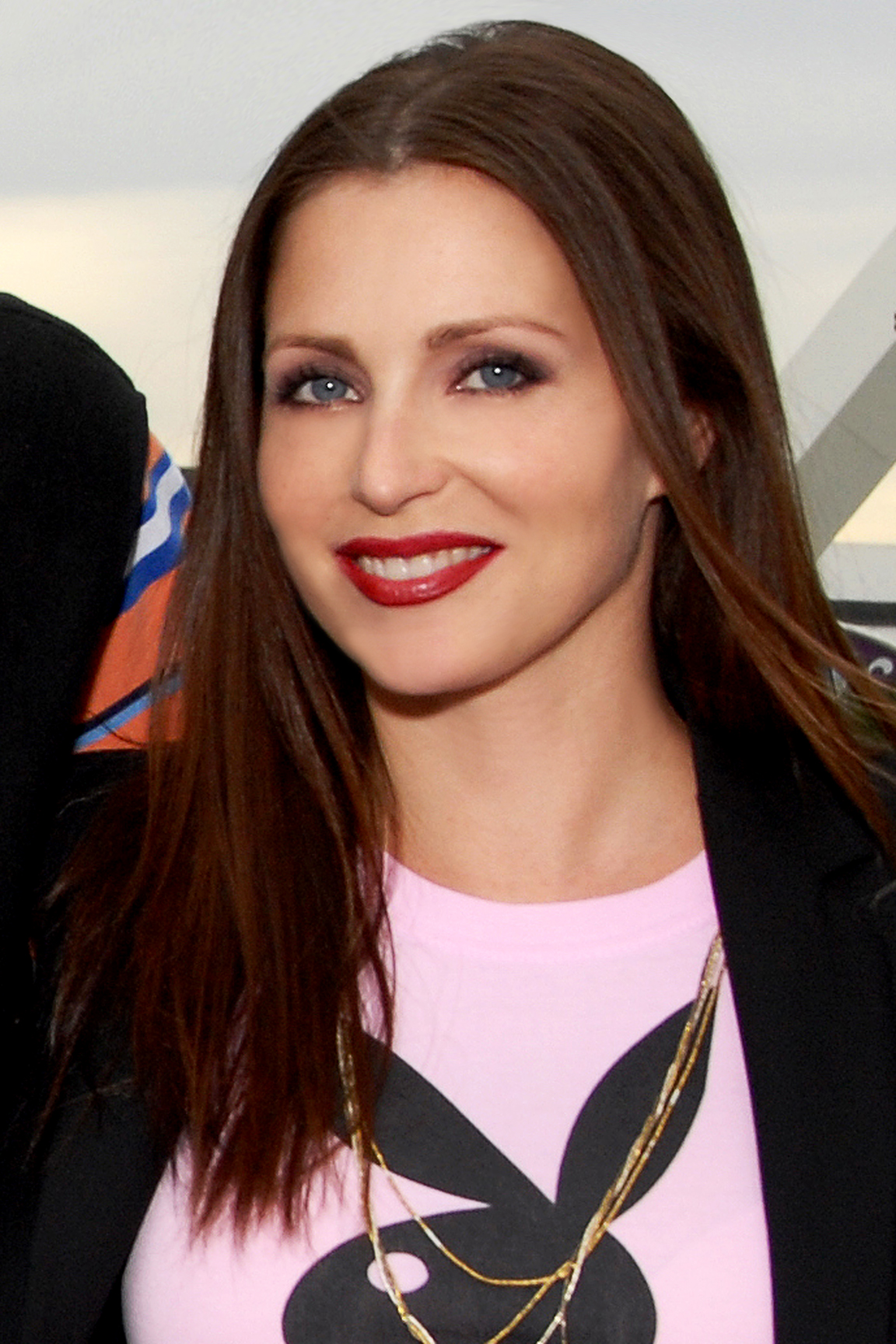
- Deanna Brooks, Los Angeles, California on November 29, 2011

Playboy centerfold appearance
- May 1998
- Preceded by: Holly Joan Hart
- Succeeded by: Maria Luisa Gil

Personal details
- Born: April 30, 1974 (age 52) Boulder City, Nevada
- Height: 5 ft 4.5 in (1.64 m)

Deanna Brooks (born Deanna Wilson on April 30, 1974, in Boulder City, Nevada) is an American glamour model and former actress who was Playboy magazine's Playmate of the Month in May, 1998.

Brooks was raised in a family of Mormons and kept her Playboy modeling a secret from her parents and siblings. She expressed an early interest in studying aeronautical engineering with her sister after seeing the film Spacecamp. She is a 1992 graduate of Bellbrook (OH) High School and worked as a bank teller for Key Bank before her Playboy appearance.

After her May 1998 centerfold, she made a brief appearance on the television show Vibe. Brooks was also photographed by celebrity photographer William Shatner for the Cyber Club in 2004. She was previously married to Tony Brooks.

== Filmography ==
- 10 Playboy videos
- The Rowdy Girls (2000)
- Girls of the Hard Rock Hotel & Casino Las Vegas (2001)
- For F**k's Sake (2004)
- Candy Stripers (2006)
- Dealin' With Idiots (2013)

== Notable TV guest appearances ==
- Wild On! playing "Herself" in episode: "Women of the World" 30 August 2001
- Cold Pizza playing "Herself" 17 December 2004

Heather Kozar	Julia Schultz	Marliece Andrada	Holly Joan Hart	Deanna Brooks	Maria Luisa Gil
Lisa Dergan	Angela Little	Vanessa Gleason	Laura Cover	Tiffany Taylor	Dahm triplets
