= Bootleg Canyon Mountain Bike Park =

Biking venue in Boulder City, Nevada

Coordinates: 35°58′52″N 114°51′37″W

Bootleg Canyon Mountain Bike Park is an venue located in Bootleg Canyon within the northern section of Boulder City, Nevada, in the desert near Lake Mead and Hoover Dam. Consisting of a variety of different types of trails including cross-country (XC) and downhill (DH), the park was created by artist and cycling enthusiast Brent Thomson. International Mountain Bicycling Association has designated Bootleg Canyon as an "Epic ride".

== Photography and maps ==
- Gallery
- Map at Official website: BootlegCanyon.net
- Southern Nevada Mountain Bike Association: Bootleg Canyon
- Bootleg Canyon on Google Earth with .kmz download file: Bootleg Canyon Mountain Bike Park, Boulder City NV
