= Boulder City, Nevada =

City in Nevada, United States

- City
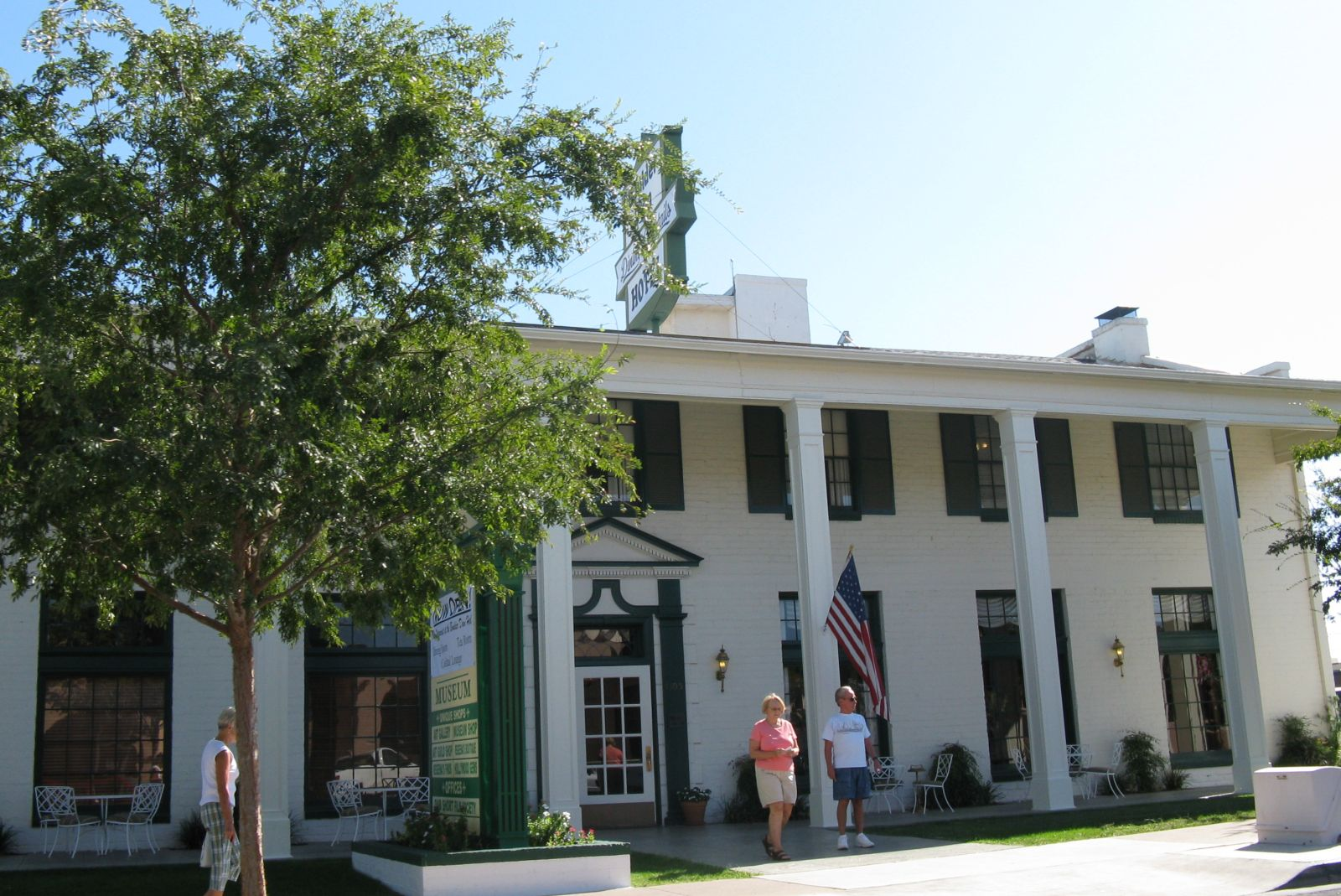
- Boulder Dam Hotel, built in 1933

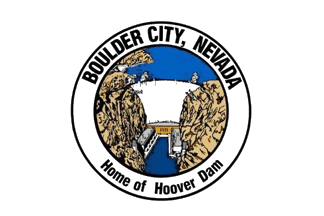
- Flag
- Nickname: Home of Hoover Dam
- Location within Clark County

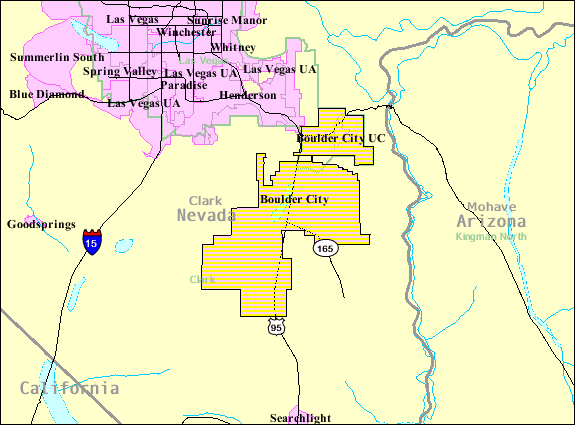
- U.S. Census map
- Coordinates: 35°58′43″N 114°49′57″W
- Country: United States
- State: Nevada
- County: Clark
- Founded: 1931; 95 years ago
- Incorporated: January 4, 1960; 66 years ago
- Named for: Boulder Canyon

Government
  - Type: Council Manager
  - Mayor: Joe Hardy (R)
  - Mayor Pro Tem: Sherri Jorgensen
  - City Council: Cokie Booth; Denise Ashurst; Steve Walton
  - City Manager: Ned Thomas

Area
  - Total: 208.30 sq mi (539.49 km^{2})
  - Land: 208.26 sq mi (539.40 km^{2})
  - Water: 0.031 sq mi (0.08 km^{2})
- Elevation: 2,510 ft (765 m)

Population (2020)
  - Total: 14,885
  - Density: 71/sq mi (27.6/km^{2})
- Time zone: UTC−8 (PST)
  - Summer (DST): UTC−7 (PDT)
- ZIP codes: 89005–89006
- Area codes: 702 and 725
- FIPS code: 32-06500
- GNIS feature ID: 858617
- Website: www.bcnv.org

Boulder City is a city in Clark County, Nevada, United States. It is approximately 26 miles (42 km) southeast of Las Vegas. As of the 2020 census, the population of Boulder City was 14,885. The city took its name from Boulder Canyon. Boulder City is one of only two places in Nevada that prohibits gambling, the other being the town of Panaca.

== History ==
=== Beginnings as federal company town ===
The land upon which Boulder City was founded was a harsh, desert environment. Its sole reason for existence was the need to house workers contracted to build the Hoover Dam on the Colorado River (known commonly as Boulder Dam from 1933 to 1947, when it was officially renamed Hoover Dam by a joint resolution of Congress). Men hoping for work on the dam project had begun settling along the river in tents soon after the precise site for the dam had been chosen by the Bureau of Reclamation in 1930. Their ramshackle edifices were collectively known as "Ragtown".

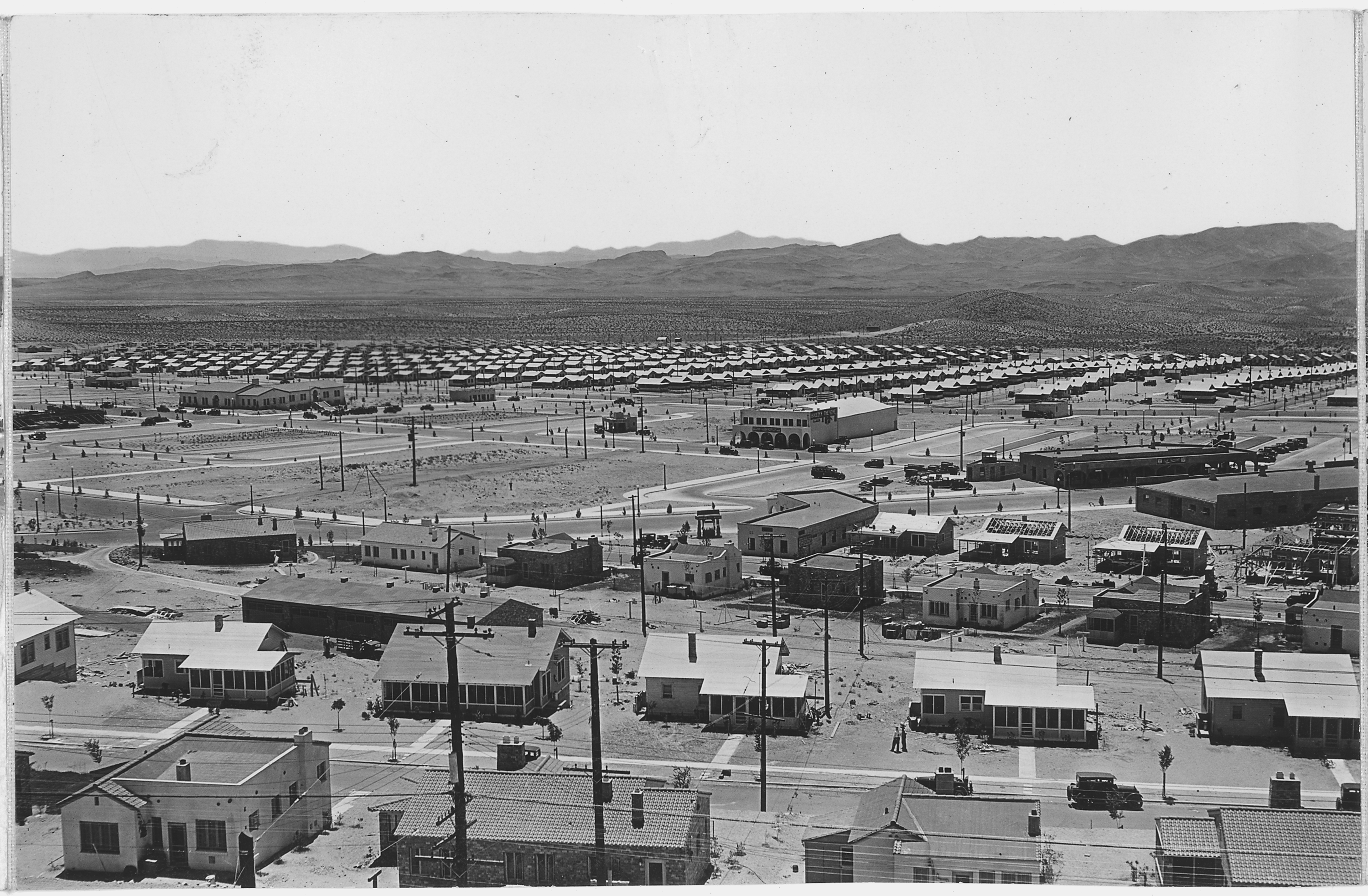
June 30, 1932

Boulder City was originally built in 1931 by the Bureau of Reclamation and Six Companies, Inc. as housing for workers who were building the Hoover Dam.

The sheer scale of the dam and duration of the project required the Bureau of Reclamation to consider the construction of a semi-permanent town rather than a temporary arrangement. Boulder City was exceptionally rare as an example of a town fully planned under government supervision. This is unlike 19th-century privately funded company town examples found in the United Kingdom, such as Port Sunlight, or in the United States, such as Pullman, Chicago.

=== Early years: 1930–1934 ===
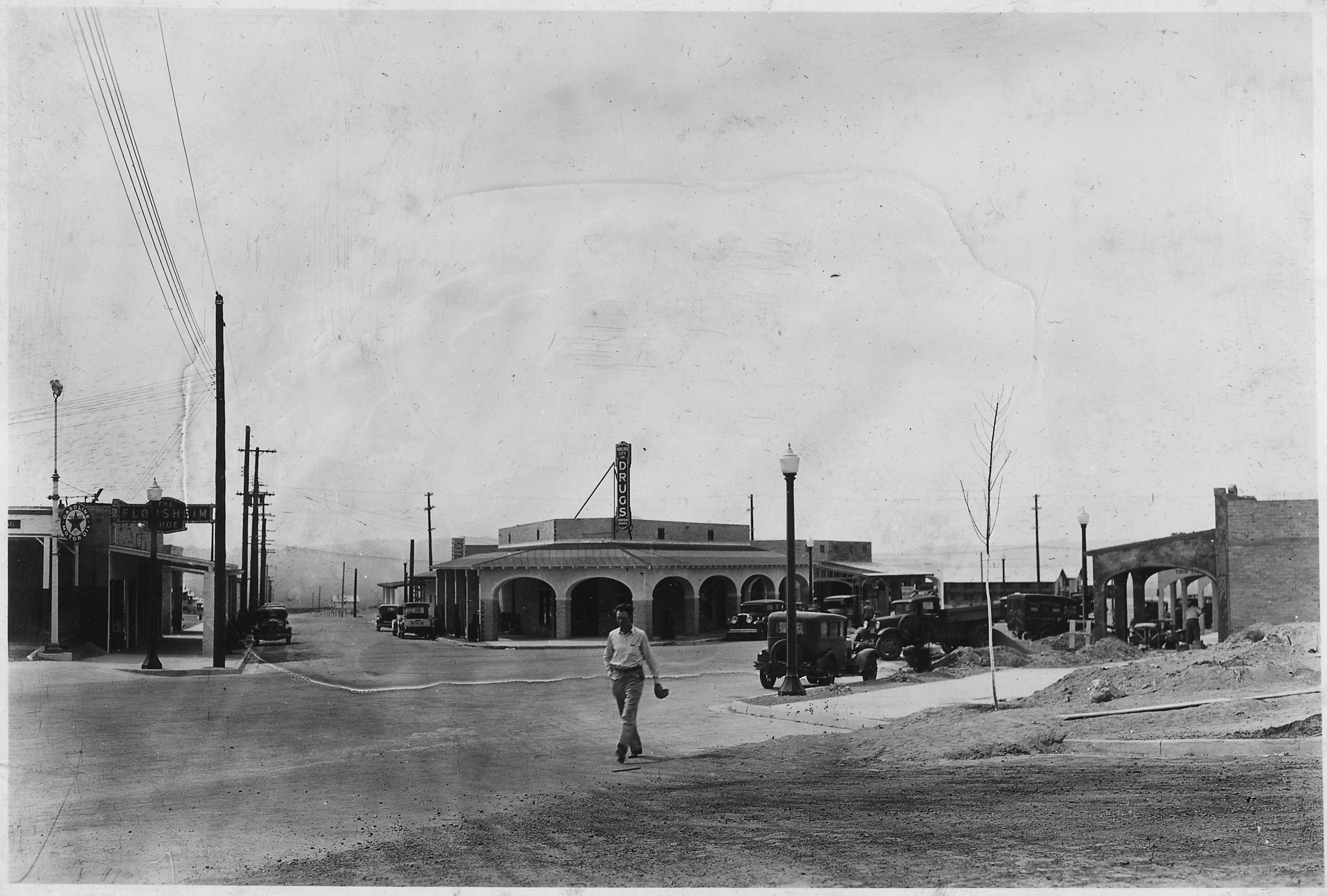
Boulder City, 1932

Boulder City was carefully planned through federal supervision as a model community, with Dutch-born urban architect Saco Rienk de Boer contracted to plan it. DeBoer had been a planner for Denver, Colorado, and was to design many towns and suburbs around the Rocky Mountain region. Because the Hoover Dam project itself represented a focus for optimism for a country suffering from the effects of the Great Depression, the town itself was to be an additional manifestation of this optimism. There was to be an emphasis on a clean-living environment for dam workers. The plan submitted by DeBoer in 1930 was formal and symmetrical with a park and the Bureau of Reclamation building at the termination of the two main axes. The plan was deemed too expensive to carry out in its original form and was modified to allow for more regular block sizes. Nevertheless, its allowance for public space and copious amounts of landscaping earned it the moniker "Nevada's Garden City". The provision of green landscape was another expression of the Bureau of Reclamation's "mission to reclaim and 'green' the American West."

The town was designed to house approximately 5,000 workers. The status of the workers on the Hoover Dam was reflected in their house sizes and locations. The most important employees had their residences on top of the hill nearer the apex. Managers were housed further down the hill, and dwellings for manual laborers were located furthest away from the public buildings and parks. The most radically modified portions of DeBoer's plan were in these lower-class residential blocks, where open space and parks were largely eliminated.

Commercial development was restricted and severely regulated under Sims Ely, the city manager. There were limits to the number of different types of stores allowed in the city, and all who wished to begin a business were screened for character and financial viability. On the other hand, there was no provision for schools in the burgeoning city, probably because the Bureau of Reclamation expected that single male workers would populate the town. The town made do with makeshift schoolrooms until the city won the right for state-funded schools to be established on the federal reservation upon which Boulder City was situated. No hospitals were provided in the city either. Injured workers had to travel 33 miles (53 km) to Las Vegas Hospital, and when a hospital was established in the city, females were not admitted for a number of years.

=== Similarity to earlier company towns ===
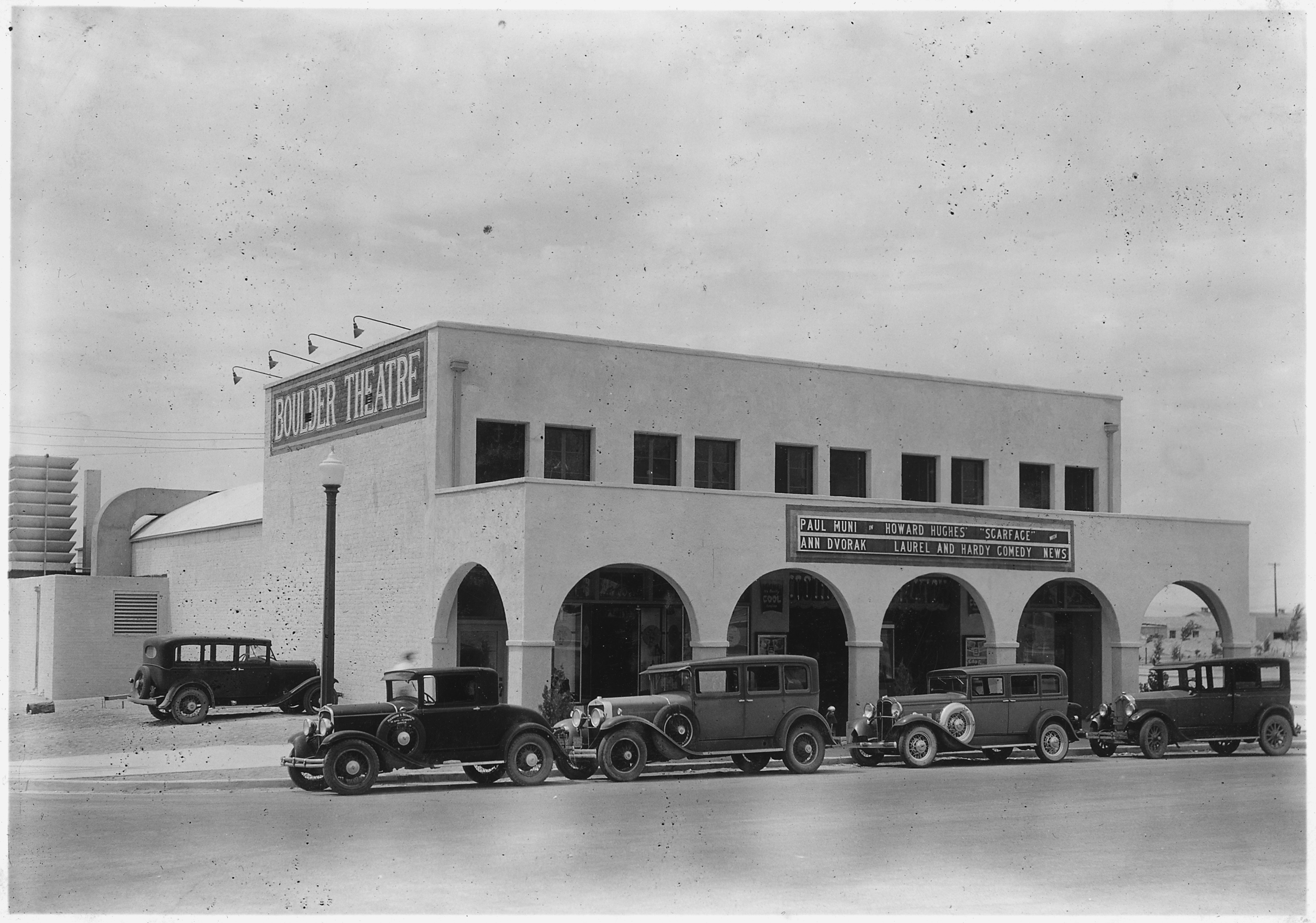
Boulder Theatre (1932), the first air-conditioned building in the city, is listed on the National Register of Historic Places.

Like in Port Sunlight, an early model of a company town, the workers of Boulder City were under strict monitoring: alcohol was prohibited in the town until 1969 and gambling has been prohibited since the city's outset. The city was founded during the Prohibition era. Boulder Theatre, established in 1931, meant that workers were not obliged to travel to Las Vegas for amusements. Such measures were common for company towns dating back to the 19th century, since sober workers surrounded by their own gardens and provided with appropriate entertainment would be more productive during their working days.

In the case of Boulder City, the prohibition of alcohol and gambling was at least partly due to the proximity of Las Vegas, which had a notoriously rowdy vice district. Visitors to Boulder City were admitted by permit, and by 1932, there was a gatehouse through which all visitors had to pass.

=== Trendsetter for decentralization ===
While the establishment of Boulder City occurred while Las Vegas was modest in size with approximately 5,000 inhabitants, it was effectively the beginning of the fragmentation of cities in the region of Clark County. This move to disperse to multiple centers predated the decentralization movement of the 1970s. The nearby city of Henderson, founded in 1943 and based around the magnesium industry, was another early example of decentralization before Clark County had a significant population: "...the region began to decentralize and regroup as a multi-centered area early in its history." The independent governments of Henderson, North Las Vegas, Las Vegas, and Boulder City have perpetuated the fragmented nature of the region, giving each city its individual character, as well as generally stymieing the outward growth of these cities.

=== 1960s onwards ===
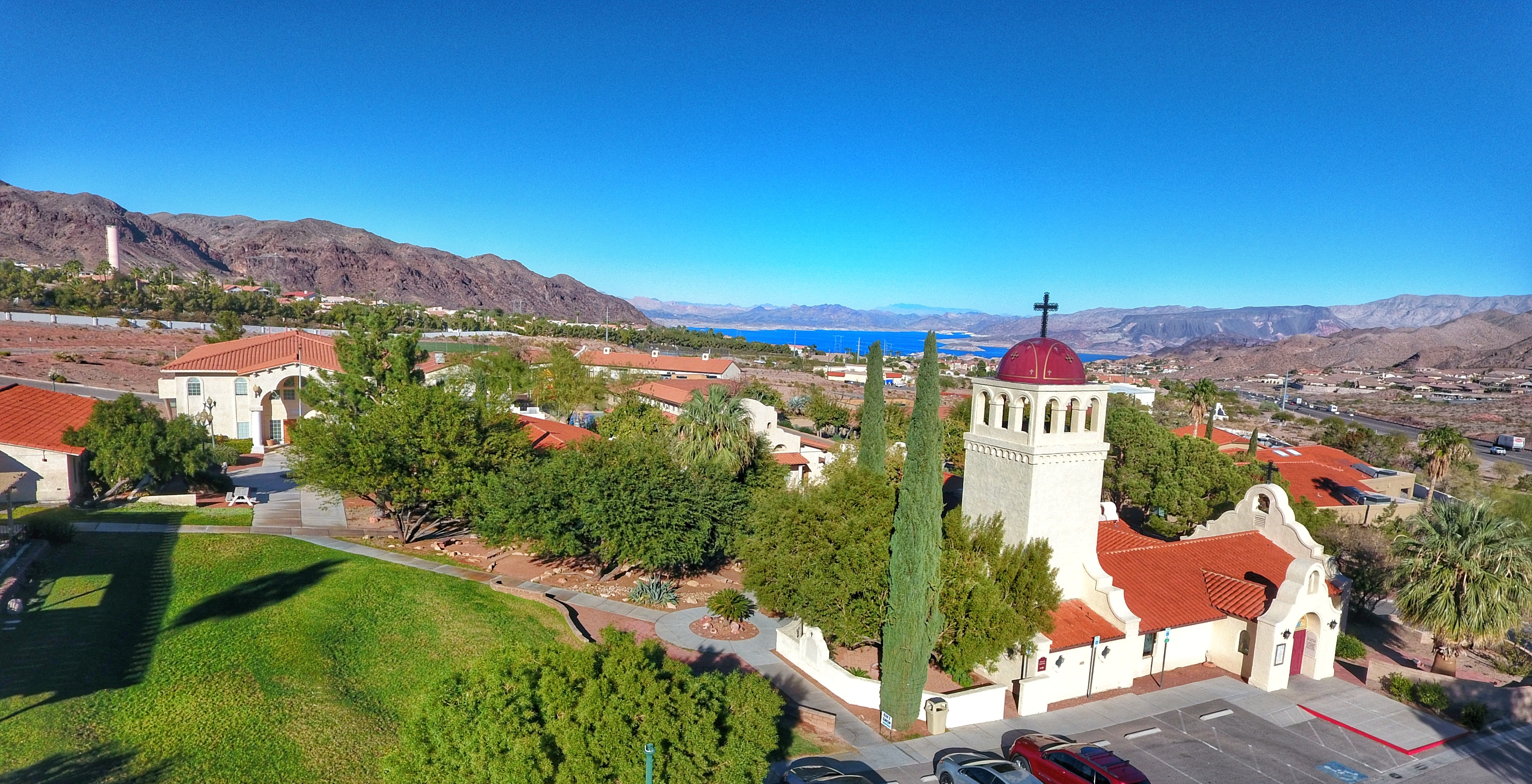
Scenic view of Boulder City in 2016

The government did not relinquish control of Boulder City until 1959, when the town was incorporated. Boulder City's incorporation ceremony took place on January 4, 1960. The city council selected pharmacist Robert N. Broadbent as the city's first mayor.

The city charter, approved by the residents, prohibited gambling within the city limits. This provision still exists, making Boulder City one of only two locations in Nevada where gambling is illegal (the other is the town of Panaca). The Hoover Dam Lodge hotel-casino permits gambling and has a Boulder City mailing address, but it is located on a parcel of private land within the boundaries of the Lake Mead National Recreation Area and thus not within city limits.

Another casino on the other end of town is the Railroad Pass Hotel and Casino, which has a Boulder City telephone prefix, but is within the boundary of the neighboring city of Henderson.

Alcohol sales were first permitted in 1969.

On August 9, 2018, the Boulder City Bypass opened to the public as part of the Interstate 11 project. The bypass is still within Boulder City's city limit, but bypasses the populated area. Initially, businesses and the populace were concerned that the bypass would have a negative effect on the local economy, though it seems that the opposite was true for some businesses.

== Geography ==
According to the United States Census Bureau, the city has a total area of 208.6 square miles (540.2 km^{2}), of which 0.039 square miles (0.1 km^{2}), or 0.02%, is water. This ranks Boulder City as the largest city in Nevada by land area and 35th in the country, but gives it a low density rate of only about 72 people per square mile.

Boulder City maintains strict controls on growth, limited to 120 single- or multi-family residential building permits for new construction per year. Hotels are also restricted to no more than 35 rooms. These restrictions are defined in the city code of Boulder City.

=== Climate ===
According to the Köppen climate classification system, Boulder City has a hot desert climate (Köppen type BWh)

Climate data for Boulder City
Month	Jan	Feb	Mar	Apr	May	Jun	Jul	Aug	Sep	Oct	Nov	Dec	Year
Record high °F (°C)	75 (24)	86 (30)	91 (33)	97 (36)	111 (44)	114 (46)	117 (47)	112 (44)	110 (43)	106 (41)	90 (32)	78 (26)	117 (47)
Mean daily maximum °F (°C)	54.5 (12.5)	59.9 (15.5)	67.6 (19.8)	76.4 (24.7)	85.9 (29.9)	95.9 (35.5)	101.6 (38.7)	99.5 (37.5)	92.6 (33.7)	79.8 (26.6)	64.5 (18.1)	55.6 (13.1)	77.8 (25.4)
Mean daily minimum °F (°C)	38.6 (3.7)	42.3 (5.7)	47 (8)	53.8 (12.1)	61.9 (16.6)	70.4 (21.3)	76.7 (24.8)	75.4 (24.1)	69 (21)	58.5 (14.7)	46.6 (8.1)	39.7 (4.3)	56.7 (13.7)
Record low °F (°C)	11 (−12)	12 (−11)	25 (−4)	31 (−1)	37 (3)	41 (5)	56 (13)	59 (15)	43 (6)	30 (−1)	26 (−3)	9 (−13)	9 (−13)
Average precipitation inches (mm)	0.66 (17)	0.64 (16)	0.66 (17)	0.34 (8.6)	0.18 (4.6)	0.09 (2.3)	0.49 (12)	0.71 (18)	0.51 (13)	0.32 (8.1)	0.43 (11)	0.51 (13)	5.55 (141)
Average snowfall inches (cm)	0.6 (1.5)	0.1 (0.25)	0.1 (0.25)	0 (0)	0 (0)	0 (0)	0 (0)	0 (0)	0 (0)	0 (0)	0 (0)	0.1 (0.25)	1 (2.5)
Average precipitation days	3	4	4	2	1	1	3	3	2	2	2	3	30
Source: WRCC

== Demographics ==
Historical population
Census	Pop.	Note	%±
1950	3,903		—
1960	4,059		4.0%
1970	5,223		28.7%
1980	9,590		83.6%
1990	12,567		31.0%
2000	14,966		19.1%
2010	15,023		0.4%
2020	14,885		−0.9%
U.S. Decennial Census

=== 2020 census ===
As of the 2020 census, Boulder City had a population of 14,885. The population density was 71.5 people per square mile. The median age was 54.3 years. 15.9% of residents were under the age of 18 and 31.0% of residents were 65 years of age or older. For every 100 females there were 97.7 males, and for every 100 females age 18 and over there were 97.1 males age 18 and over.

95.3% of residents lived in urban areas, while 4.7% lived in rural areas.

There were 6,577 households in Boulder City, of which 21.4% had children under the age of 18 living in them. Of all households, 47.1% were married-couple households, 20.2% were households with a male householder and no spouse or partner present, and 26.0% were households with a female householder and no spouse or partner present. About 30.9% of all households were made up of individuals and 18.4% had someone living alone who was 65 years of age or older.

There were 7,423 housing units, of which 11.4% were vacant. The homeowner vacancy rate was 2.7% and the rental vacancy rate was 8.9%.

Racial composition as of the 2020 census
Race	Number	Percent
White	12,768	85.8%
Black or African American	161	1.1%
American Indian and Alaska Native	104	0.7%
Asian	229	1.5%
Native Hawaiian and Other Pacific Islander	19	0.1%
Some other race	327	2.2%
Two or more races	1,277	8.6%
Hispanic or Latino (of any race)	1,356	9.1%

=== Demographic estimates ===
According to U.S. Census Bureau QuickFacts, 6.3% of residents age 5 and older spoke a language other than English at home, and 85.8% of residents were living in the same house a year earlier. The average household size was 2.37 people.

In Boulder City, 4.5% of people were under age 5. 50.6% of the population was female, with 49.4% being male.

=== Income and poverty ===
The median income for a household in the city was $69,746, and the per capita income was $41,421. About 11.4% of people were below the poverty line.

=== 2000 census ===
As of the census of 2000, there were 14,966 people, 6,385 households, and 4,277 families residing in the city. The population density was 73.9 inhabitants per square mile (28.5/km^{2}). There were 6,979 housing units at an average density of 34.4 per square mile (13.3/km^{2}). The racial makeup of the city was 94.5% White, 0.7% African American, 0.7% Native American, 0.7% Asian, 0.2% Pacific Islander, 1.3% from other races, and 1.9% from two or more races. Hispanic or Latino people of any race were 4.3% of the population.

There were 6,385 households, out of which 23.6% had children under the age of 18 living with them, 55.8% were married couples living together, 7.4% had a female householder with no husband present, and 33.0% were non-families. Of all households 27.6% were made up of individuals, and 13.1% had someone living alone who was 65 years of age or older. The average household size was 2.30 and the average family size was 2.79.

In the city, the population was spread out, with 20.4% under the age of 18, 5.3% from 18 to 24, 21.3% from 25 to 44, 29.3% from 45 to 64, and 23.7% who were 65 years of age or older. The median age was 47 years. For every 100 females, there were 97.8 males. For every 100 females age 18 and over, there were 96.0 males.

The median income for a household in the city was $50,523, and the median income for a family was $60,641. Males had a median income of $42,041 versus $30,385 for females. The per capita income for the city was $29,770. About 4.7% of families and 6.7% of the population were below the poverty line, including 9.4% of those under age 18 and 5.3% of those age 65 or over.

== Economy ==
=== Hoover Dam in marketing ===
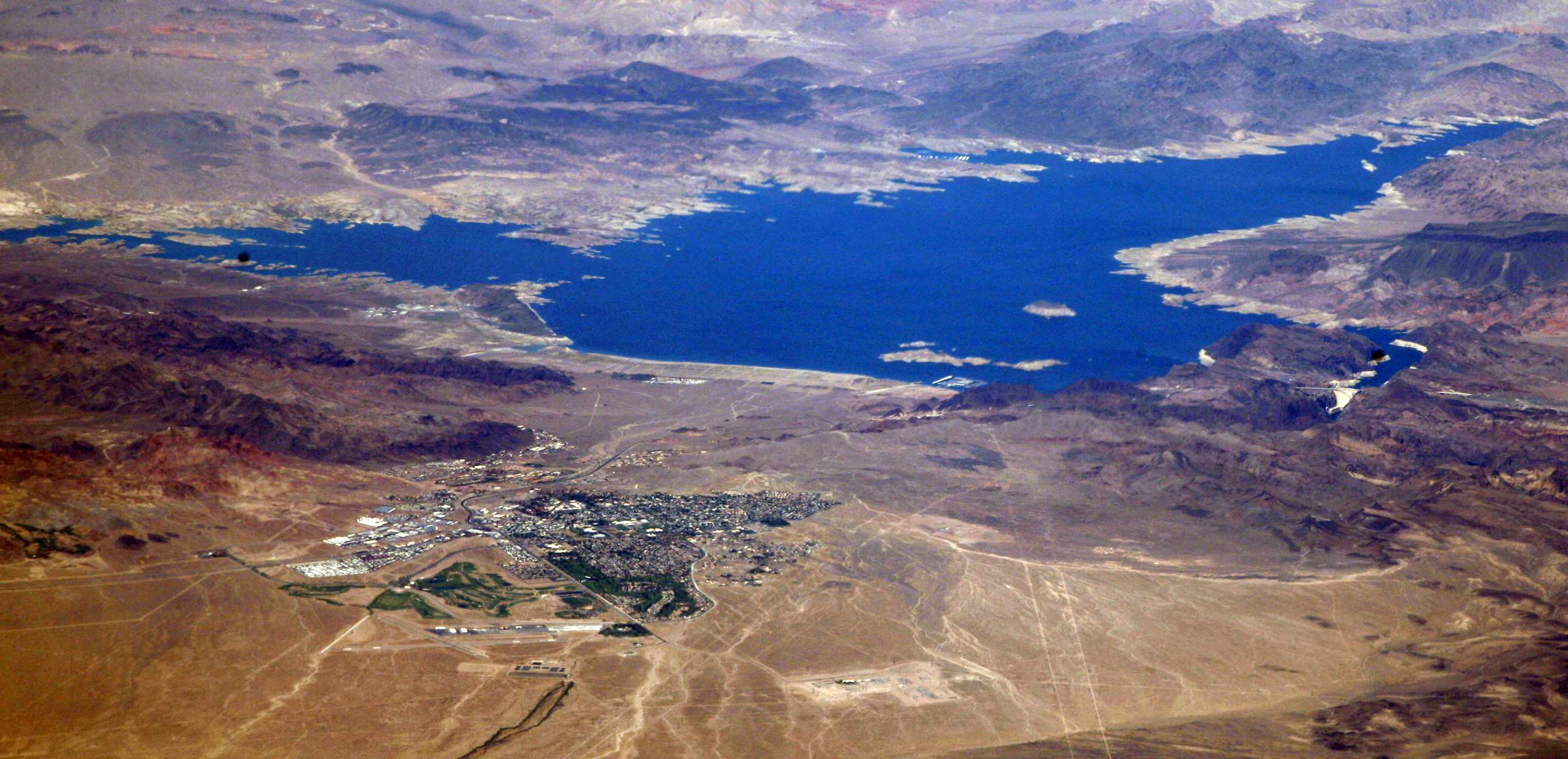
Boulder City and Lake Mead, with Hoover Dam at center right (2010)

The proximity of Hoover Dam to Boulder City is reflected in many of the businesses in the historic Downtown district, which is home to the Boulder Dam Hotel, home of the Boulder City/Hoover Dam Museum. (The hotel is named after the dam's former name.)

Making a pun on the word "damn" is also popular. The Boulder City Chamber of Commerce has used the slogan "Best City By A Dam Site" in promotions, and the city hosts an annual festival of short subject films dubbed "The Dam Short Film Festival". Boulder City also hosts a number of Hoover Dam related events such as "That Dam Guy Stole My Dam Car" car race and "Get Off My Dam Lawn" gardening festival.

=== Points of interest ===
- Alan Bible Botanical Garden
- Bootleg Canyon Mountain Bike Park
- Boulder City Conservation Easement
- Hoover Dam
- Lake Mead
- Nevada Southern Railroad Museum

== Sports ==
In 1975, a team from Boulder City won the Almost Anything Goes! national championship, broadcast on ABC television. The following year, they won a "Supergames" playoff against the 1976 champions from Chambersburg, Pennsylvania, and a celebrity all-star team. However, the show was cancelled soon after.

== Parks and recreation ==
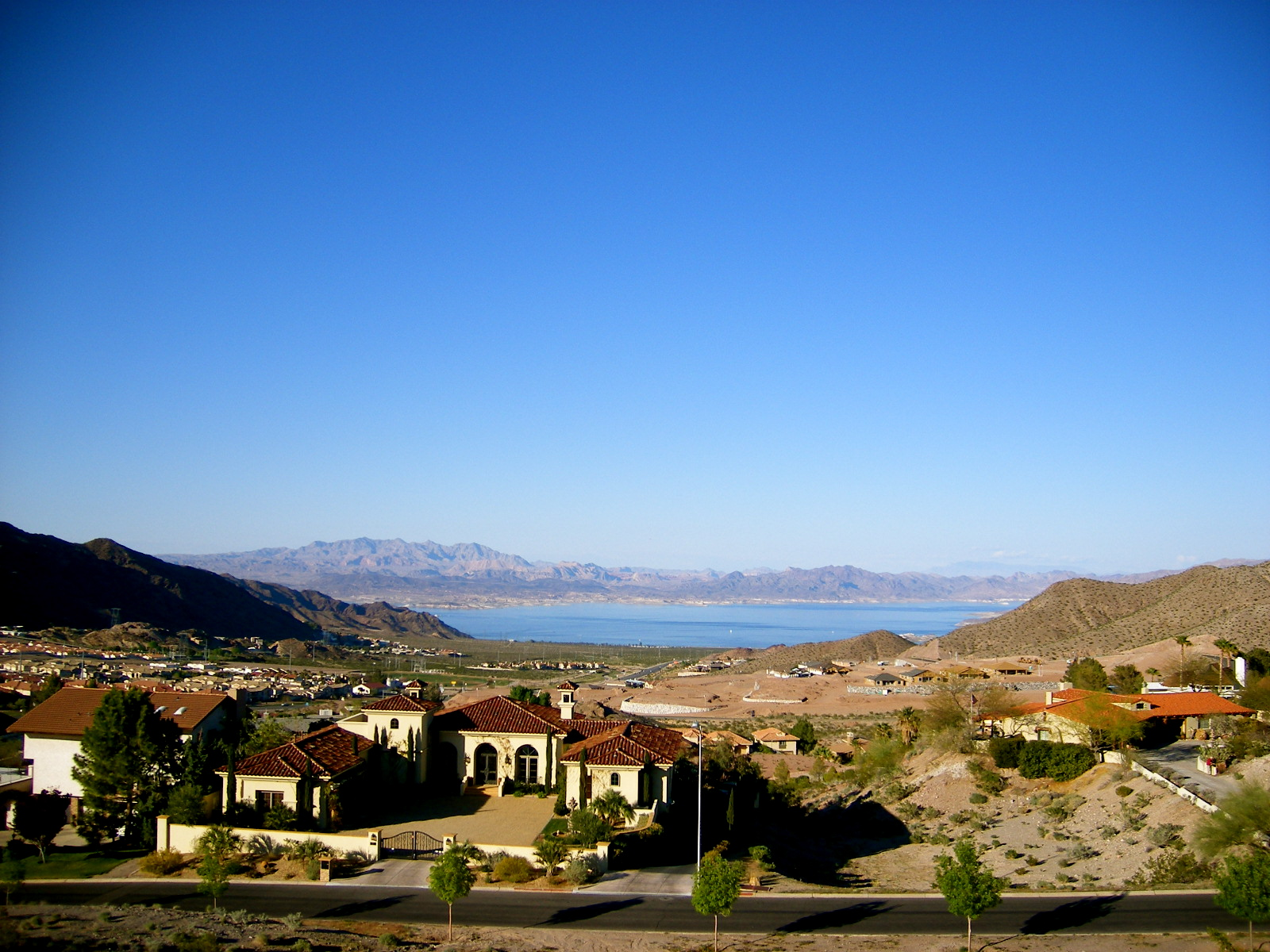
Estate homes overlooking Lake Mead (2007)

Boulder City has two municipal golf courses (Boulder City Municipal Golf Course and Boulder Creek Golf Course), one private golf course, a city pool, racquetball complex, lit tennis courts, athletic fields, BMX bicycle track, ample mountain hiking trails, its original bowling alley built in 1947 (Boulder Bowl) and is only a few miles away from Lake Mead. Nevada's first airport, Boulder City Municipal Airport, is still in operation today, accommodating private planes, skydiving trips, and scenic aerial tours of Hoover Dam and the Grand Canyon. Some of its public parks include Hemenway Park.

== Government ==
The city of Boulder City is a special charter municipality which operates under the council-manager form of government. The city council comprises five members, including the mayor, who acts as presiding officer for city council meetings. The city manager is appointed by the city council and executes the policies and directives of the city council.

Boulder City is one of two locations within the State of Nevada where military veterans and their spouses can be interred. The Southern Nevada Veterans Memorial Cemetery is located in Boulder City. The cemetery was established in 1990. The State of Nevada has more than 300,000 veterans, and is among the fastest growing region in the Western United States of people age 65 or older with the demographic of military veterans. The 79-acre (32 ha) cemetery is approximately 30 miles southeast of Las Vegas.

== Education ==
Boulder City's four public schools fall under the jurisdiction of the Clark County School District. Boulder City High School serves grades nine through twelve and has an average enrollment of 700–750 students. It was one of fourteen Clark County schools to become a five-star school in 2012. Elton & Madeline Garrett Junior High School serves grades six through eight. Martha P. King Elementary School serves grades three through five. Andrew J. Mitchell Elementary School serves grades Pre K through two. Boulder City is home to one religious school with a kindergarten program, Christian Center School, affiliated with Christian Center Church. Boulder City also has one micro school and learning center called EmpowerEd Leaders, offering kindergarten through eighth grade instruction.

Boulder City has a public library, the Boulder City Library. The Boulder City Library featured in the plot of the Oscar-winning 2016 film La La Land as the landmark across the street from the childhood home of the film's fictional heroine, aspiring actress Mia Dolan. However, scenes of Mia's neighborhood in Boulder City (including the library) were actually filmed in Santa Clarita, California.

== Media ==
Stephens Media publishes the Boulder City Review. Until it ceased publication in 2009, the Boulder City News was the local newspaper.

== Infrastructure ==
The northern Eldorado Valley contains Boulder City's "Eldorado Energy Zone", which is home to the 480 MW El Dorado natural gas power plant, as well as several other projects. In 2019, the city announced plans to lease up to 1,100 acres (450 ha) in Black Hills South as a utility-scale solar facility. The city hopes to generate $1.65 million annually from the lease.

- Boulder City Hospital
- Boulder Dam Hotel
- Copper Mountain Solar Facility

== Transportation ==
Highways in Boulder City are listed here.

- Interstate 11
- U.S. Route 93
- U.S. Route 93 Business (Boulder City, Nevada)
- U.S. Route 95
- State Route 165
- State Route 173

== Notable people ==
- Desi Arnaz, Jr. (born 1953), actor-musician who, with his wife, Amy, owns the Boulder Theatre, a former cinema converted into a live theatre, which is home to the Boulder City Ballet Company (originally from Los Angeles)
- Deanna Brooks (born 1974 in Boulder City), May 1998 Playboy Playmate
- Paul C. Fisher (1913–2006), inventor, politician and founder of the Fisher Spacepen Co. in Boulder City (originally from Lebanon, Kansas)
- Terry Goodkind (1948–2020), writer known for the epic fantasy series The Sword of Truth as well as the contemporary suspense novel The Law of Nines (2009), which has ties to his fantasy series (originally from Omaha, Nebraska)
- Scott Dozier (1970-2019) Death row inmate who grew national headlines from October 2016- January 2019 for wanting to die

== In popular culture ==
- Boulder City is featured as a playable setting in the tabletop role-playing game Tales from the Loop.
- The 1976 song "Highwayman," written by Jimmy Webb, mentions the city. The second verse of the song mentions "a place called Boulder, on the wild Colorado." The verse is sung from the perspective of a construction worker who died building the Hoover Dam.
- A scaled-down version of Boulder City is featured in the 2010 roleplaying game Fallout: New Vegas.
- Boulder City is the hometown of one of the protagonists in the 2016 musical film La La Land. It is the hometown of Amelia "Mia" Dolan (played by Emma Stone), the female protagonist of the movie, and is where she lives before moving to Los Angeles, California in pursuit of her dream of becoming a movie star. In the film, she puts on a one-woman show titled So Long Boulder City, which gets her noticed by an agent.
- Boulder City is mentioned in S1E6 of Milo Murphy's Law.
- The novel Lords of St. Thomas (GWP, 2018) by Jackson Ellis tells the story of the last family to vacate nearby St. Thomas, Nevada in 1938 following construction of the Boulder Dam. The book is set partly in Boulder City, and is where the Lord family patriarch, Thomas, lives and works upon taking a job with Six Companies.
