= School resource officer =

Police officer assigned to a school

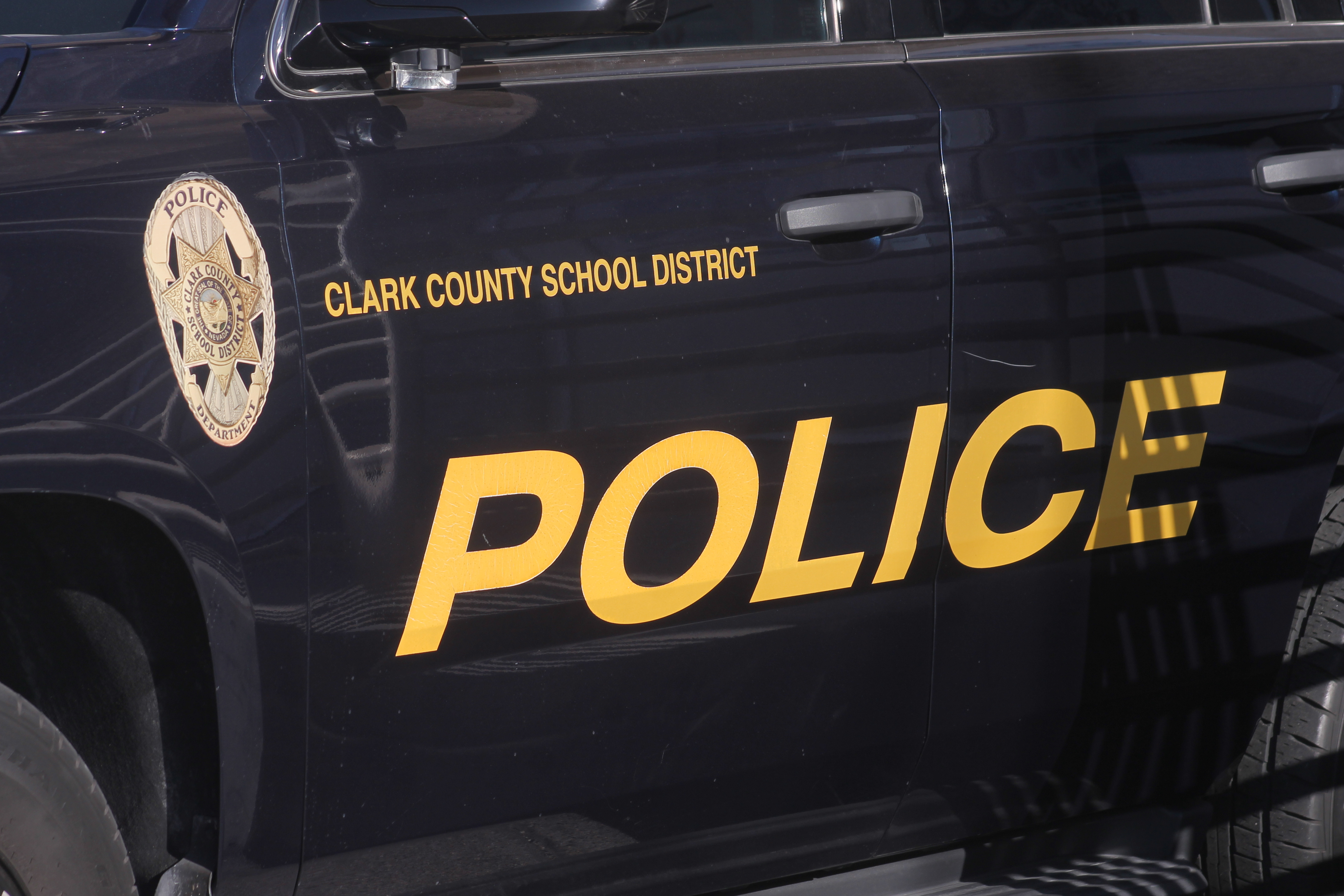
Clark County School District Police Department vehicle

The United States Department of Justice defines school resource officers (SRO) as "sworn law enforcement officers responsible for the safety and crime prevention in schools". They are employed by a local police or sheriff's department and work closely with administrators in an effort to create a safer environment for both students and staff. The powers and responsibilities are similar to those of regular police officers, as they make arrests, respond to calls for service and document incidents.

SROs typically have additional duties, including mentoring and conducting presentations on youth-related issues. They are not school-based law enforcement officers, who are typically employed by a school district's law enforcement agency rather than local or city law enforcement, though the terms are often used interchangeably.

== History ==
=== United States ===
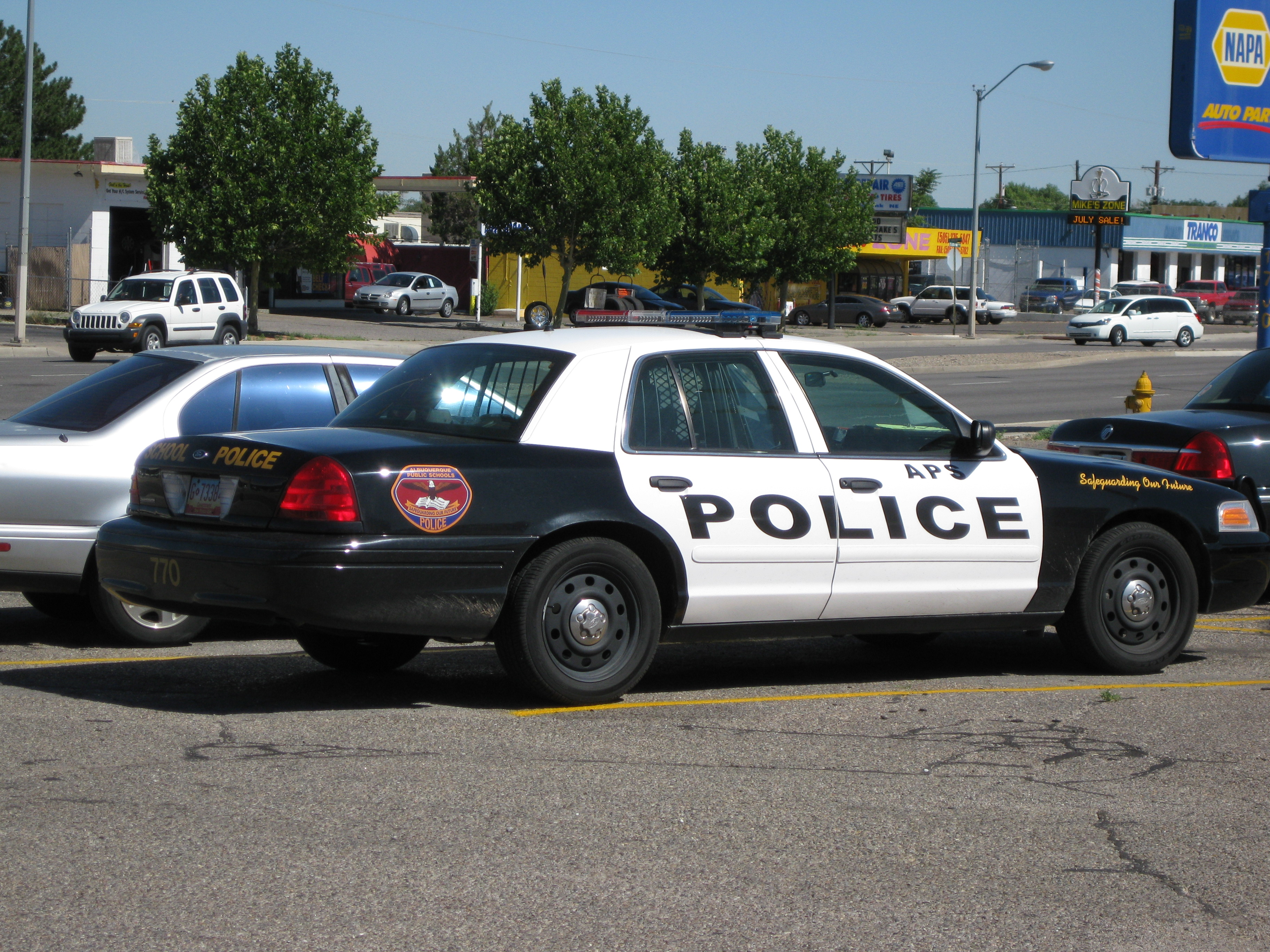
Albuquerque Public Schools police vehicle

The first documented SRO was placed in a school in Flint, Michigan in 1953 as a community policing strategy. They strategized that placing police officers in school would improve the relationship between local police and youth. Flint, Michigan considered the program to be a success, and would become a model for future schools that would adopt the SRO program. Before the first documented SRO, the Los Angeles School Police Department formed their own adaptation of the program in 1948. It was developed to patrol and protect schools while neighborhoods began to desegregate. This is considered to be the first type of policing program in the United States.

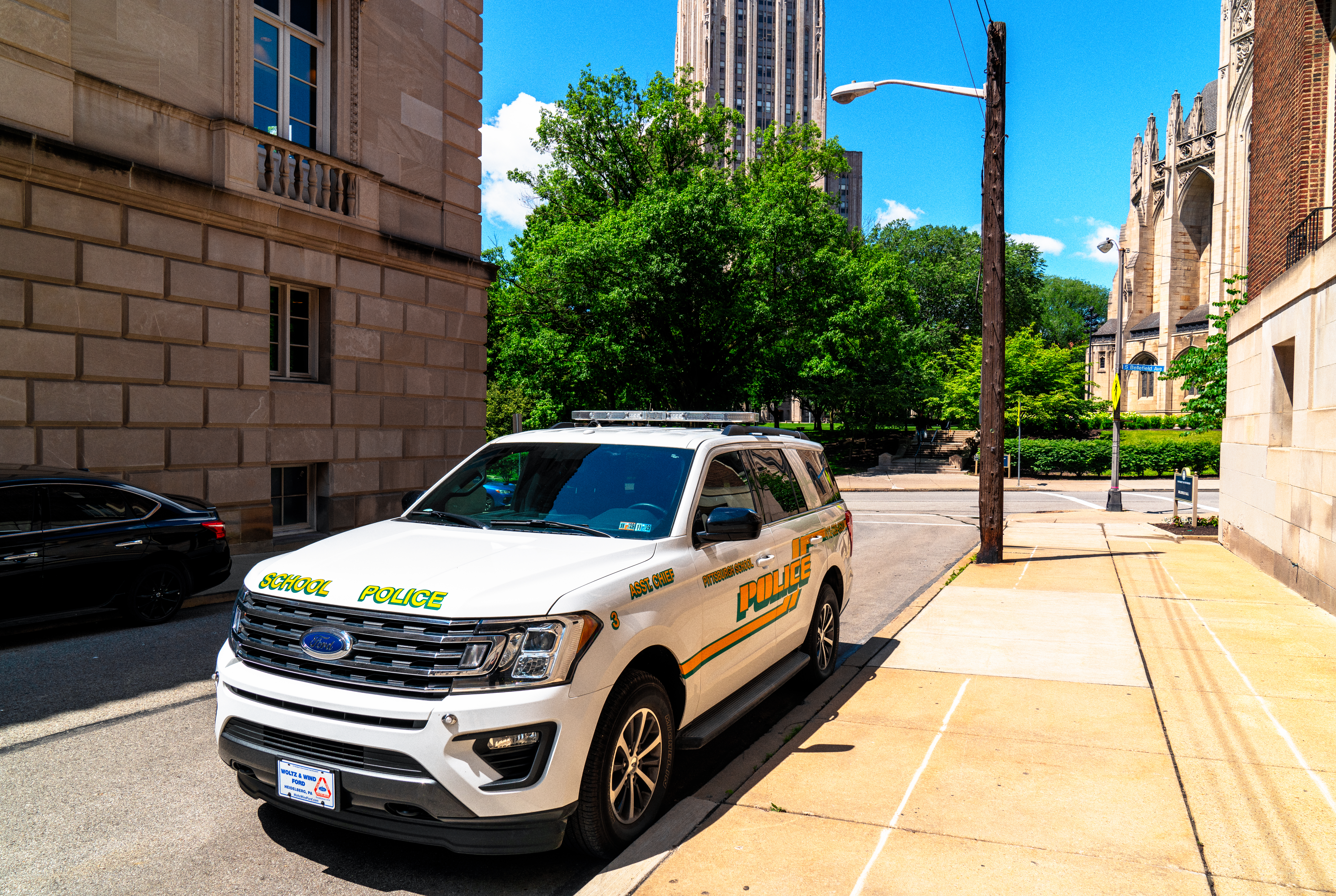
Pittsburgh Public Schools Police Car

After Flint, Michigan, municipalities across the nation implemented SRO programs with the goal of creating stronger community ties between police and the youth and to protect the safety of students. In 1966 The Chicago Police Department set a precedent for the new presence of policing in schools by establishing the first “Officer Friendly” program. Their movement served as an example for several policing programs that would follow including D.A.R.E. (Drug Abuse Resistance Education) and G.R.E.A.T. (Gang Resistance Education and Training). However, these programs did not launch until the 1980s and 1990s. Fresno, California also created a new standard for school policing in 1968 to promote community relationships between the public and law enforcement.

The 1990s mark a period of substantial change to SRO programs in the United States. This change came about after the school shootings at Columbine High School in 1999 where 13 students were fatally shot by fellow peers, and Jonesboro Middle School in 1998 where four students and one teacher were fatally shot by fellow peers as well. These troubling instances raised concern about school safety leading to the most attention SRO programs had received in country history. Between 1999 and 2005, the federal government awarded more than $750 million to hire nearly 7,000 school resource officers across the country to tackle the new surge of school shootings. Between 1997 and 2007, the number of SROs in schools rose by approximately 6,700.

In more recent years, school shootings like Sandy Hook and the Parkland Massacre have continued to bring attention to the need for more safety in schools. This continued to incentivize the funding of SRO programs. In 2013, President Barack Obama announced a plan to prioritize federal grant application from law enforcement agencies that were looking to hire school resources officers. The rise of school shootings is one of the most obvious reasons for the increasing presence of SROs in schools across the nation, but it is not the only one. In the 1980s and early 1990s, there was a rise in juvenile crime that also led to the expansion of the SRO program. In 1994 the Congress passed the Gun-Free Schools Act in fear of the juvenile and gang violence happening across the country. The passage of this act increased SRO presence as well.

=== Canada ===
Like the United States, many secondary schools in Canada have hired security personnel to enhance the safety of staff and students. Major cities such as Calgary, Edmonton, Regina, Vancouver and Winnipeg maintain their SRO programs offered by their local city police, alongside small rural towns mainly in the provinces of West Canada with their programs offered by the Royal Canadian Mounted Police due to its rural nature. The SRO program in Vancouver is styled as the School Liaison Officer (SLO) Program. The City of Surrey also maintains its own SRO program, however like small rural towns is offered by the RCMP as it is its primary law enforcement agency in the city. This is set to change when the Surrey Police Service is fully implemented in November 2024, replacing the currently existing RCMP detachment in Surrey.

A SRO program used to exist in the city of Toronto. The Toronto SRO program was set up in 2008, with the Toronto District School Board (TDSB) and the Toronto Catholic District School Board (TCDSB), in collaboration with the Toronto Police Service. The SRO Program was implemented by permanently placing armed, uniformed police officers in secondary schools. This program was later terminated in November 2017 by the school board.

The Ottawa Police Service and Peel Regional Police's SRO programs were also terminated by their respective school board in 2021 and in 2020 amidst the anti-police movement in the United States and Canada. Edmonton and Vancouver also had their SRO programs similarly terminated, but were later brought back citing the importance of these officers for the safety of students.

== Purpose ==
Different governments, school districts, and professional agencies have varied descriptions for the purpose of SROs. The National Association for School Resource Officers details the SRO's role as threefold: 1) as an educator, 2) as an informal counselor or mentor and 3) as a law enforcement officer. The United States Department of Justice includes the three prongs, and adds 4) an emergency manager or planner for a school or district. Johns Hopkins University's Center for Technology in Education aggregated SROs' job descriptions across the country and identified seven comprehensive purposes for an SRO, including 1) provide law enforcement and investigation, 2) develop crime prevention programs, 3) training and securing school personnel, 4) establish a working relationship with school and students, 5) develop classes related to the position, 6) assist students in conflict resolution, and 7) be a positive role model.

In addition, SROs' are managed by different institutions depending on their location. At school, most SROs are treated as staff and report to the principal or other school administrators. When not at school, they are often managed by a law enforcement agency.

=== Crime prevention ===
Crime prevention is a major component of being an SRO. National Association of School Psychologists contends that properly trained SROs trained in threat assessment play a key role in a school's comprehensive safety planning and implementation.

The US Department of Education and Secret Service recommends all schools develop Threat Assessment Teams (consisting of an SRO or liaison officer, a principal and a mental health professional and/or counselor) on school-based threat assessment teams. This multidisciplinary approach to violence utilizes a team approach that meets together to offer different perspectives to help solve problems. The team's collaborative approach makes certain that each situation is carefully assessed so there is not under or over-reaction to a situation. The team should meet on a continuous basis for best communication. The team follows a decision-tree process to help determine if a threat made at the school is transient or serious. The multidisciplinary approach is preventive because it identities students that could be on the path to violence and intervenes to get them the wraparound services they could need to put them on a more positive path. Most threats are considered transient, however each and every threat must be properly assessed with the help of an SRO since the consequences can be so severe. Research from psychologists has shown these teams are the opposite of zero-tolerance and help to establish better school climates, reduce suspensions without racial bias, and help to prevent violence to both self and others. School resource officers play a key role as far as gathering information in identifying and monitoring a student for follow-up after a threat has been made. The most widely used Threat Assessment model for schools is the Virginia Threat Assessment Guidelines for K–12 schools. The model, tailored by psychologist Dewey Cornell, is evidence-based and has been tested in six controlled studies. The model always includes school-based law enforcement, most often an SRO. {Reference schoolta.com}

=== SECURe rubric ===
The Safe School–based Enforcement through Collaboration, Understanding, and Respect (SECURe) rubrics were created through a partnership between the United States Department of Education and the Department of Justice. SECURe provides plans for initiating or improving SRO/law enforcement relationships with schools.

SECURe identifies five action items for schools and law enforcement agencies to collaborate on (quote):

1. Create sustainable partnerships and formalize Memorandum of Understandings (MOUs) among school districts, local law enforcement agencies, juvenile justice entities, and civil rights and community stakeholders.
2. Ensure that MOUs meet constitutional and statutory civil rights requirements.
3. Recruit and hire effective SROs and school personnel.
4. Keep SROs and school personnel well trained.
5. Continually evaluate SROs and school personnel, and recognize good performance.

== Outcomes ==
=== Prominence ===
In the 2015–16 school year, the following percentages of schools in the U.S.A. reported having one or more SROs at their school at least once per week:

- 77% of schools with 1000 or more students
- 47% of schools with 500–999 students
- 36% of schools with 300–499 students
- 24% of schools with fewer than 300 students

Overall, 42% of public schools host an SRO and an additional 10.9% host a sworn law enforcement officer, as of 2016. Towns (defined as a territory within an urban cluster) have the highest concentration of SROs as 57% of schools in towns host at least one SRO. This is compared to 45% of suburban schools and 36% of city schools. Almost a third of public schools that host an SRO are more than 80% black, while less than 42% of the schools that host an SRO are majority white. The majority of large schools in the US have some sort of security staff present.

=== Juvenile crime reduction ===
It is difficult to tell if the presence of SROs is having an impact on the prevalence of crime in schools and communities, likely because it is difficult to show a causal relationship between the presence of law enforcement and crime rates. For example, in a 2018 study that compared Kentucky high schools that hosted an SRO to Kentucky high schools that did not, there was no statistically significant relationship between reported criminal violation rates and the presence of an SRO. However, a 2013 study that analyzed data across the United States found that schools that increase their use of police see an increase in reported crime.

A 2012 report from the National Association of School Resource Officers cites national statistics that show a general decrease in juvenile crime and the violent-crime index since the early 2000s, when SROs became especially prominent in schools. They support this claim with a 2009 study that finds that "when the results were controlled for economic disadvantage, the presence of an SRO led to a 52.3% decrease in the arrest rate for assaults and a 72.9% decrease in arrests involving possession of a weapon on school property." While this is true, having an SRO in the school also significantly increases the arrest rate for disorderly conduct, even when controlling for school poverty, a more subjective charge that relies considerably on the discretion of the arresting officer, as opposed to something like an assault or weapons charge that is much more objective. This result lends itself to the idea that the presence of an SRO may increase the criminalization of behaviors that could have been addressed in other ways. Further, the decrease in arrests for assault and weapon possession could be from a result of students avoiding the SROs and taking these activities off campus, not necessarily the result of them failing to commit these crimes at all. In another article, James Swift also refers to the report prepared by the Justice Policy Institute. His writing further indicates that the presence of school resource officers does not lead to a reduction in crime.

=== Teaching and mentorship ===
A 2017 study combined crime data from the U.S. Department of Education and interviews with 20 SROs to better understand how officers are spending their time between teaching, mentorship, and law enforcement.

=== Financial costs ===
A 2011 report from the Justice Policy Institute considered the cost of SROs as compared to other full-time employees at secondary schools. An SRO is paid at the rate of a police detective, which in 2011 was paid an average of $63,294 per year. This salary was more than both the average teacher's salary and the average school counselor's salary in 2011. Opponents of SROs often cite this as a reason to not employ an SRO, as it may strain an already tight school budget. However, in some cases, law enforcement agencies have been known to split the cost of employing an SRO with the district.

== Law and policy ==
=== Memorandums of understanding ===
Because SROs are responsible for a number of tasks outside of normal duties for law enforcement officials, it has become common practice to establish a Memorandum of Understanding (MOU) between the school district and the local law enforcement agency. These MOUs tend to vary in content based on the needs of the school district, but common ideas include the specified mission of the SRO, the organizational structure, and the goals and procedures for the SRO. Other MOUs are more specific and include the day-to-day duties of the SRO, where the SRO would be located in the school building, how an SRO will be selected, who is responsible for training, and chain-of-command issues. The National Association of School Resource Officers provides helpful guidelines and questions that should be reflected in an MOU to ensure the safety of students and to guard against legal action that could be taken against the law enforcement agency and/or the school.

MOUs often fall short in clearly defining the school's role and the SRO's role in student discipline and maintaining a safe environment. As a result, an SRO may find himself/herself making decisions in the moment that disrupt the balance between student safety and students' rights. Kimberly Small, Assistant General Counsel for the Illinois Association of School Boards, recommends specifying policies, in line with applicable laws, on issues of "search and seizure, questioning of students, and requests for student records."

=== Federal policies ===
While the federal government does not have specific laws regarding the use of SROs, the U.S. Department of Education and Department of Justice created the Safe School–based Enforcement through Collaboration, Understanding, and Respect (SECURe) rubrics to help provide guidance to school districts.

Students can, however, file civil rights claims against school resource officers. Kerrin Wolf, an assistant professor of law at Stockton University, reviewed a series of Supreme Court decisions that have shaped the federal civil rights of students while in school. In her paper, she explores the ways in which students' rights are limited in three dimensions while in school: rights against search and seizure, interrogation rights, and free speech rights.

- Search and Seizure: New Jersey v. T.L.O. (1985) loosened probable cause requirements for school officials in two ways: it required less evidence to justify a search and a school official can suspect a student of breaking a law or a school policy, which covers significantly more actions than just breaking a law. Vernonia School District 47J v. Acton (1995) and Board of Education v. Earls further expanded schools' ability to search students by allowing for random drug testing for all students involved in extracurricular activities. However, Safford Unified School District v. Redding (2009) placed some restrictions on schools by identifying strip searches as too intrusive. Courts remain divided regarding the question of whether school resource officers need probable cause or reasonable suspicion to conduct a search of a student on school grounds because they are agents of a law enforcement agency, not school officials.
- Interrogation: In State v. Barrett (2018), the Louisiana court found that a Miranda warning was not required by a school official to question a student. As far as how this requirement extends to SROs, In the Matter of V.P., 55 S.W.3d 25. (2001) found that Miranda warnings are not required in an investigation involving an SRO if a school administrator performs the questioning. In re Marquita M. (2012) took it a step further by claiming that holding a student in a school office for questioning does not qualify as "in custody" (and, therefore, requires a Miranda warning) because it is not a threatening environment, like a police station, where coercion could occur.
- Free Speech: In Tinker v. Des Moines Independent Community School District (1969), the court upheld two students' right to wear black armbands in protest of the Vietnam War. Since that case, however, free speech for students in schools has been diminished. In subsequent cases, courts have allowed schools to limit speech that they consider to be disruptive or counter to the pedagogical mission of the school.

=== State laws ===
Only eight U.S. states currently have laws on the books regarding school resource officers and/or police in schools. Generally, these laws only cover the definition of an SRO and mandate training. However, in November 2016, New Jersey signed into law Bill S86, which allows schools to hire retired law enforcement officers as SROs under the condition that they receive no benefits, can work full-time hours, are no older than age 65, and retired within three years of application to the SRO program.

== Controversies ==
The legitimacy of school resource officers is a contentious and complex issue involving education, justice, and safety. Barbara Fedders, Associate Professor of Law at UNC and the Director of Clinical Programs and faculty supervisor of the Youth Justice Clinic, argues against the legitimacy of SROs with the following key points: school community policing policies become informed and prioritized based on the values and motivations of the SRO; SROs create a power imbalance and dominance within the school settings due to their presence; SROs' punitive nature and intimidation are not conducive to a learning environment; the presence of police in schools can undermine trust between students and educators and can erode feelings of safety; SROs authority has been known to impede the principal and teacher's responses to minor infractions, mischievous behavior, and inappropriate actions by students where SROs enforcement of the law escalates to legal consequences for children. The criminalization of youth behavior before their prefrontal lobe development is problematic. Scholars argue that SROs police unfairly and disproportionately target black and brown students and those with disabilities.

Those arguing in favor of SROs talk about how they deter violence, drug use, criminal behavior, and disruption in schools, the SROs ability to respond to outside emergencies and threats, and the potential for SROs to minimize harm in an active shooter crisis. Strategic collaboration with school staff and SROs to improve school environments and increase safety awareness are additional key points by proponents. Positive relationships nurtured by SROs trained in cultural competency and diversity can provide mentorship and support to students and the school community. Often SROs can be resources for civil duty and community engagement and many may teach subjects related to social studies, legal systems, and political sciences. There is also an argument that SROs helpfully enhance and legitimize the law enforcement agency's position in the local jurisdiction.

=== Police brutality ===
There have also been a number of incidents in the United States in which school resource officers and/or police officers called into schools are reported to have used excessive force against students. Some of those incidents include:

- In May 2017, an in-school police officer with the Dallas Independent School District (ISD) allegedly handcuffed and tasered a seven-year-old special needs student and, in that same week, another in-school officer at another Dallas ISD reportedly body-slammed and pepper sprayed a 12-year-old female student on campus.
- In October 2015, a police officer was filmed body-slamming a 16-year-old girl at her desk in Spring Valley High School in South Carolina.
- Also in October 2015, two police officers were called into Round Rock High School in Texas to break up a fight between students. Students filmed one of the officers choking one of the 14-year-old students involved in the fight.
- A school resource officer for Tolman High School in Rhode Island fell under investigation in 2015 for body-slamming a 14-year-old student, leading to massive protests the following day over the SRO's behavior.
- In August 2015, the ACLU filed a lawsuit against a Kentucky school for allowing a school resource officer to handcuff an eight-year-old boy and a nine-year-old girl, both of whom had special needs.

These incidents are among many that have caused significant concern over the ability of schools to control the actions of school resource officers and other police officers when they are asked to intervene in student conflicts. SRO's are not governed by the school board. They are controlled by the laws of the state in which they work and their agencies' policies and procedures. When the law is broken by a perpetrator and there is a victim of a crime, charges must be brought. It is not the choice of school staff whether a law enforcement officer can act in filing charges.

=== Increasing arrests of juveniles ===
School resource officers are becoming more commonplace in American and Canadian schools, leading to increasing concerns that their presence in secondary schools could prematurely expose adolescents to the criminal justice system. School districts across the United States are implementing criminal justice system practices in order to achieve a safe schooling environment; however, this comes at the cost of exposing youth/adolescents to the criminal justice system and tarnishing their educational achievements for situations that in the past would likely have been handled through disciplinary action within the school. This is seen by some as contributing to a phenomenon commonly known as the school to prison pipeline.

A criticism of school resource officer programs pertains to the rate of juvenile arrests. In a 2011 article by Amanda Petteruti issued by the Justice Policy Institute, information is presented that indicates that school referrals to the juvenile justice system have increased with the presence of SROs. A high percentage of those referrals were for minor offenses that may have been handled by the administration had an SRO not been present. This concern has attracted attention and some studies indicate that the use of the Juvenile justice system for minor offenses aids in a phenomenon known as the "School to prison pipeline". In contrast, overall juvenile arrests have gone down according to data from the DOJ. If the proliferation of SRO programs in the US is adding to arrests, the data showing this correlation is missing.

The American Civil Liberties Union (ACLU) suggests that SRO programs should be designed to provide a different response for disciplinary matters as opposed to criminal offenses that occur on school grounds. This recommendation was intended to ensure that juveniles were not receiving disparate treatment based on the presence of a law enforcement officer within their school. This can be properly handled if there is a solid agreement or memorandum of understanding between the school and the police.

=== Effectiveness ===
The February 14, 2018 shooting which killed 17 people at Stoneman Douglas High School brought renewed attention to the topic of police in schools. The police officer assigned to the school resigned shortly after the shooting under criticism of not entering the school building while the student was shooting. Given the frequency with which school shootings occur in the United States, critics of SRO programs are asking if it is necessary to have armed police officers in schools, if they cannot ensure students' safety during crises. The commission report showed that the counselor and SRO both recommended Cruz, the shooter, be Baker Acted and the mental health service system did not follow through with their recommendation, so Cruz was allowed to purchase guns after turning 18.

The shooter in Maryland's Great Mills High School attack on March 20, 2018, was neutralized following swift action by the school's resource officer, Blaine Gaskill. As CNN put it: "Gaskill's response was hailed as an example of exactly what a resource officer is supposed to do in such a circumstance, particularly when contrasted to the actions of the security officer in last month's shooting in Parkland, Florida." However in the DOJ's Report on the response to the mass shooting at Robb Elementary School in Uvalde, Texas, where 19 children and two teachers lost their lives on May 24, 2022, an examination and timeline of the responses by the SRO and law enforcement were determined to be inadequate and ultimately called a failure based on national standards, expectations, and acceptable practices. The comprehensive review consisted of interviews, extensive location study, and collecting and combing through over 14,000 individual data items related to the incident.

The discussion surrounding school resource officers encompasses diverse perspectives and considerations, reflecting ongoing debates regarding their role, effectiveness, and potential impact on school environments, safety measures, and relationships within their communities. Examining the impact of SROs on school climate, student perceptions of safety, sense of belonging, and trust in authority figures considering both positive and negative effects will progress the conversation.

== See also ==
- School security surveillance
- Security cameras
