= Clark County, Nevada =

County in Nevada, United States

Clark County
- U.S. County
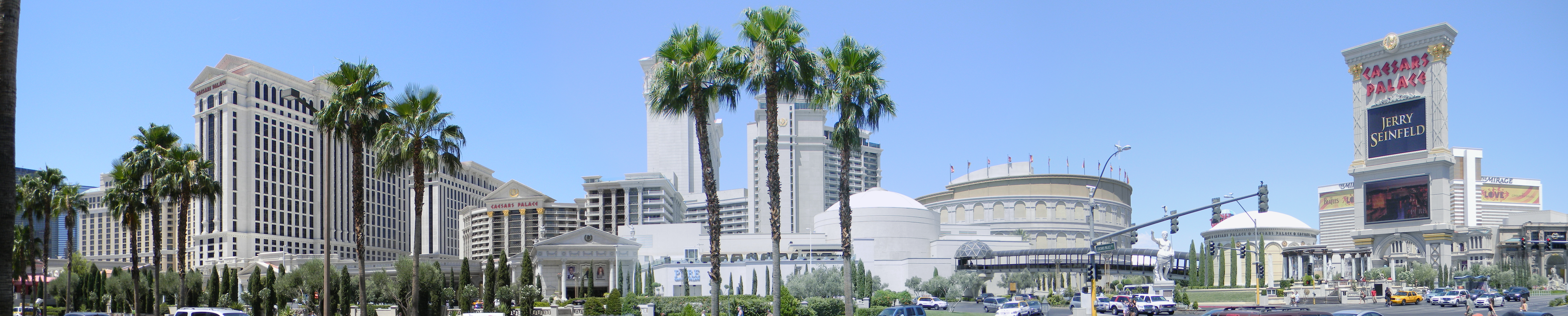
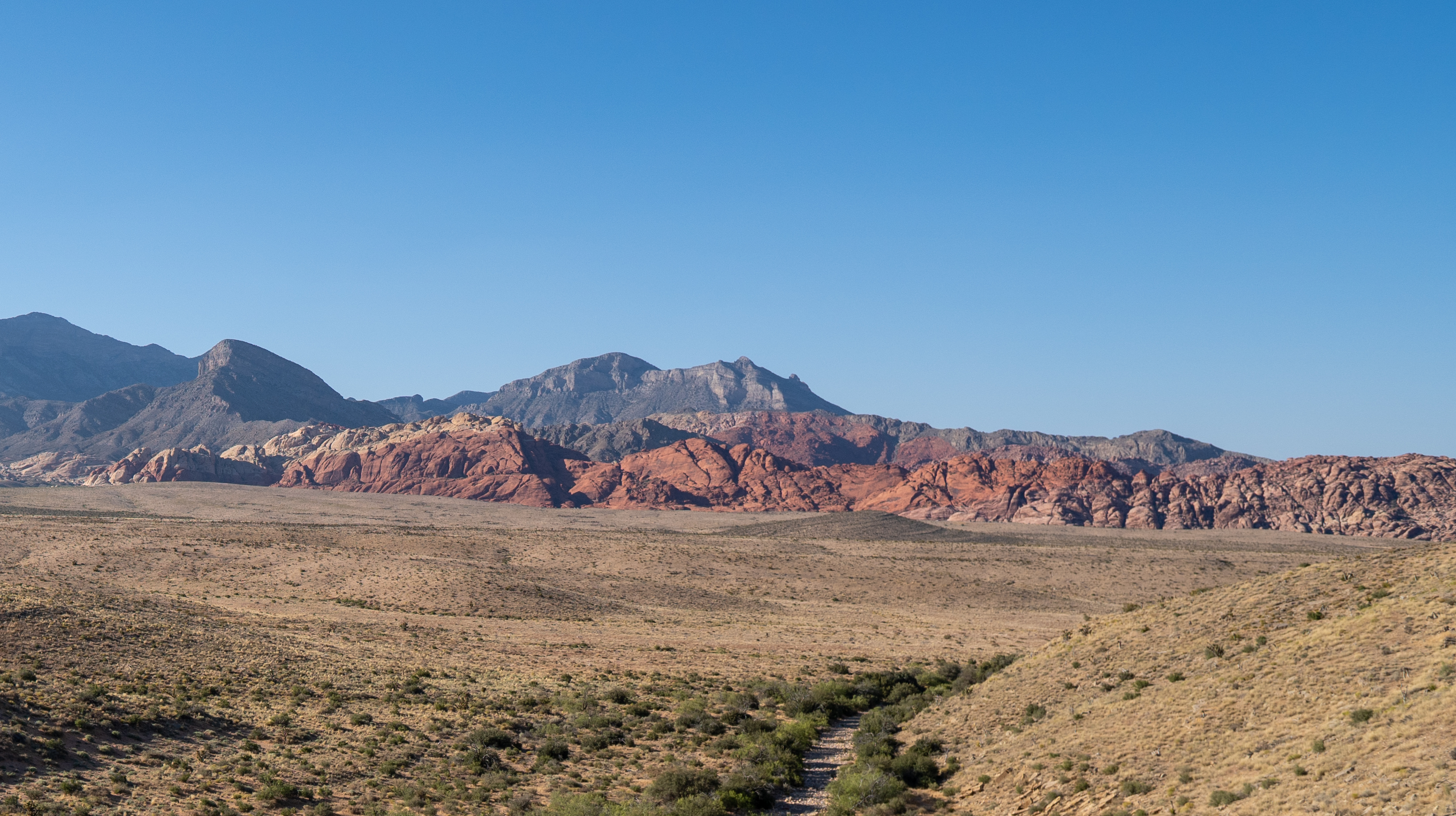
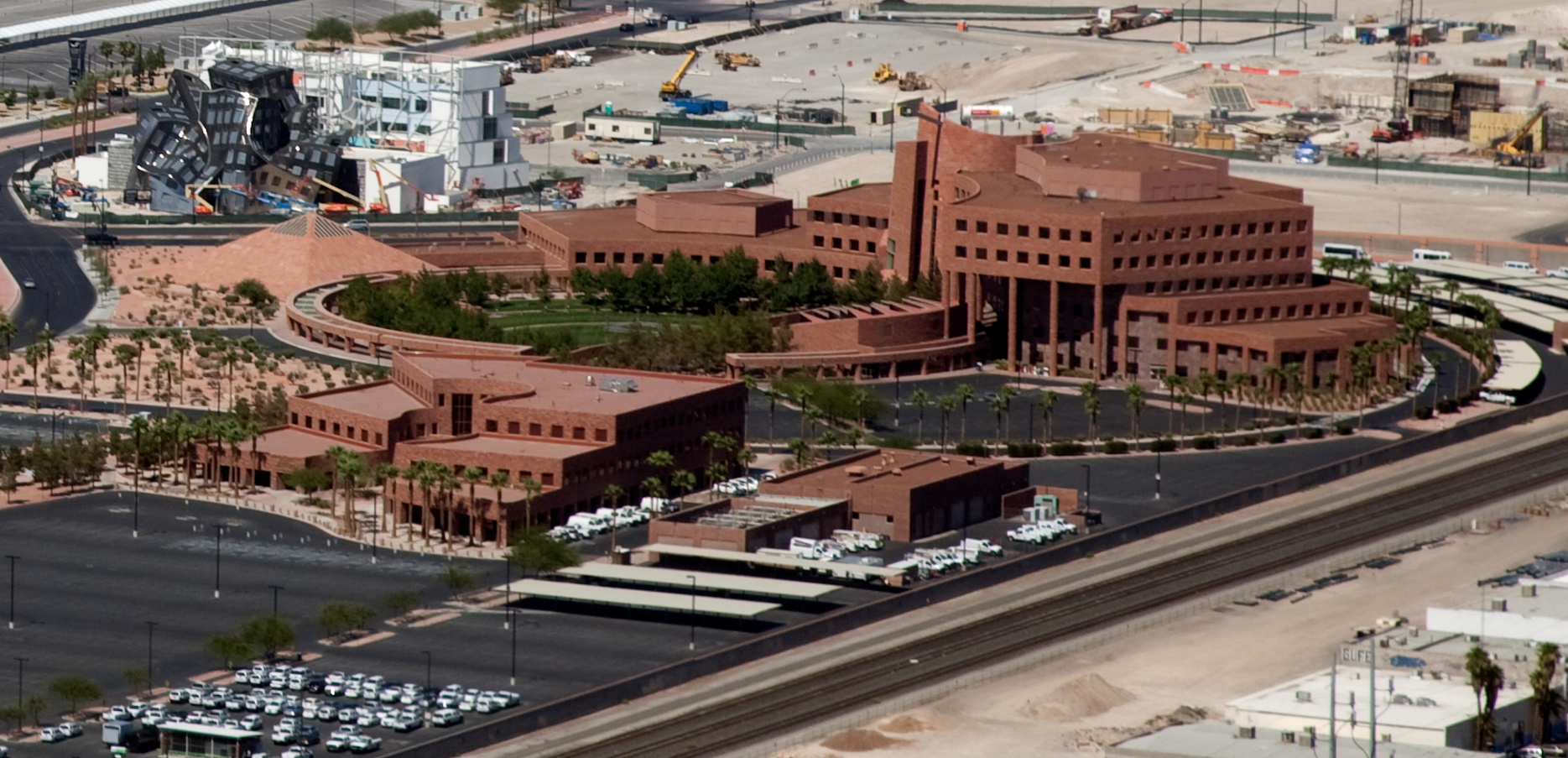
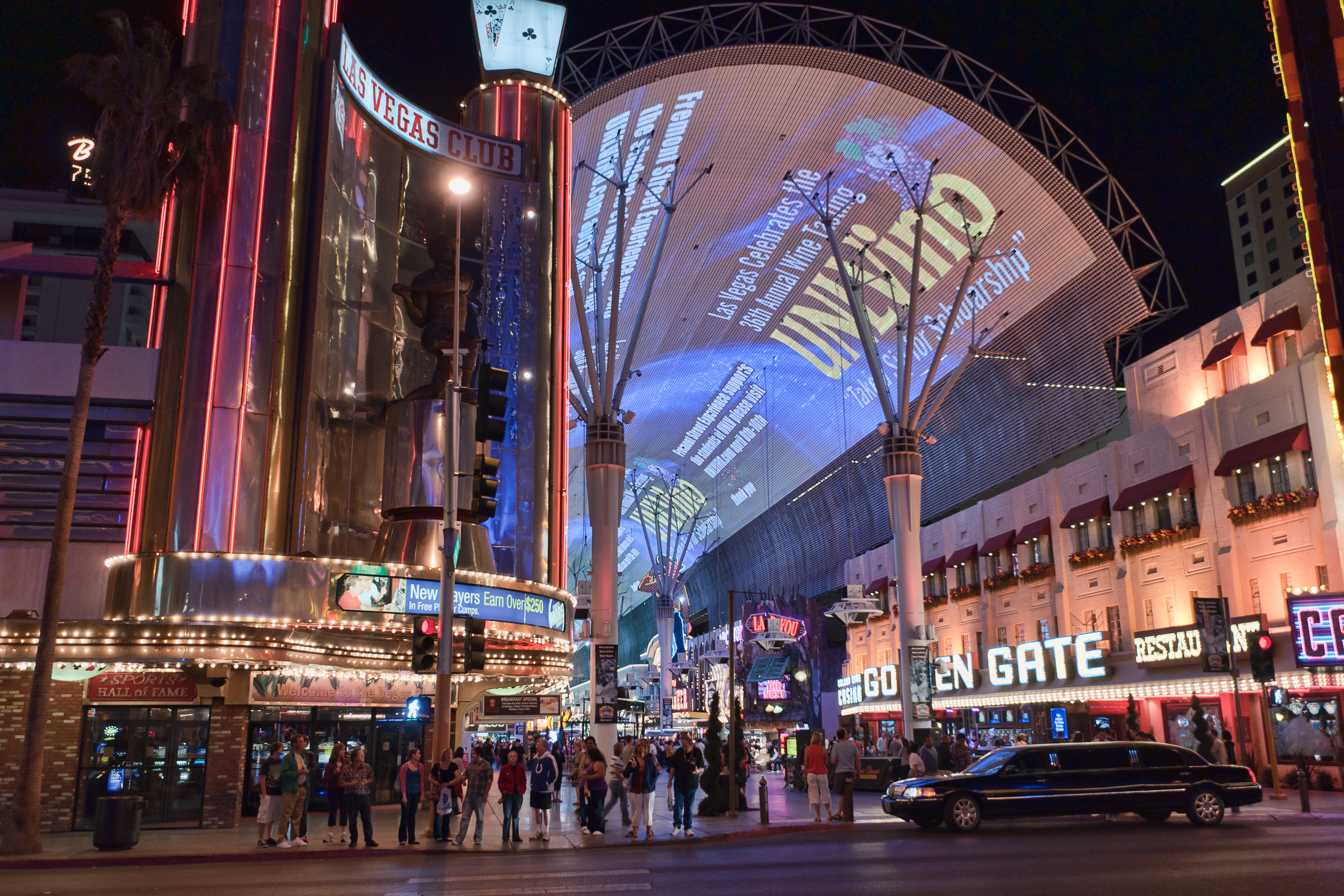
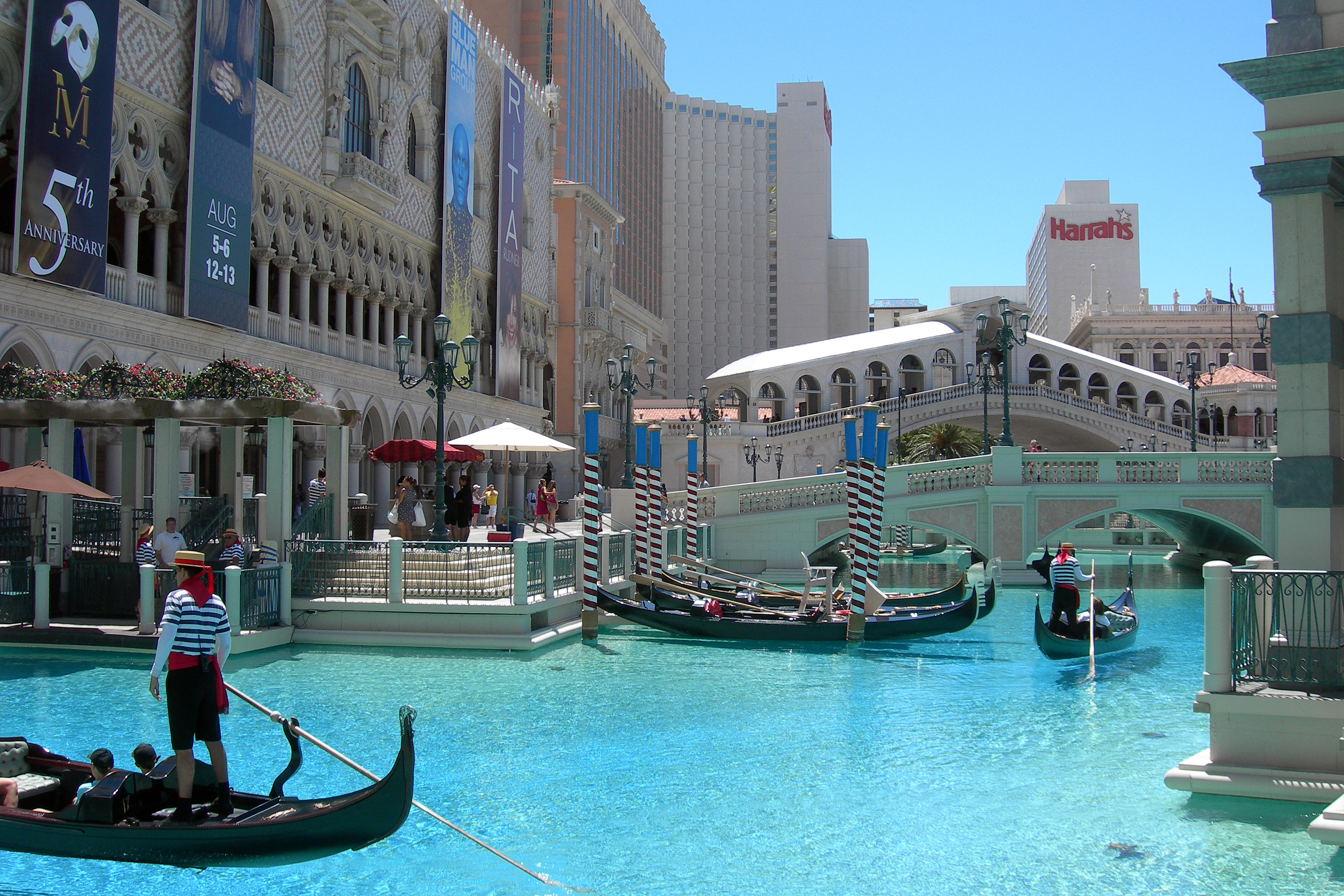
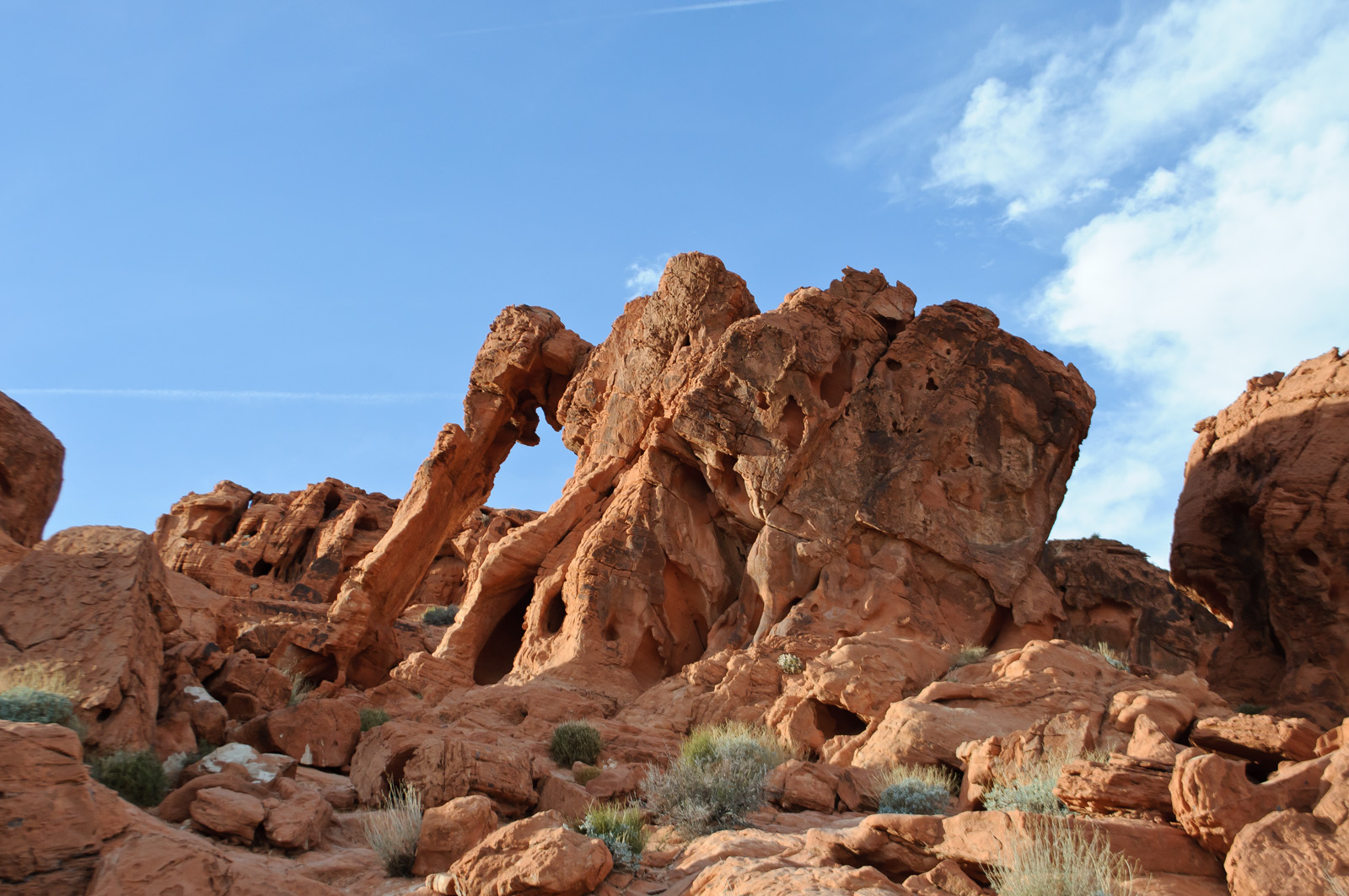
- From top, left to right: Caesars Palace panorama, Red Rock Canyon National Conservation Area, Clark County Government Center, Fremont Street Experience, The Venetian, Elephant Rock at Valley of Fire State Park

- Flag Seal Logo
- Motto: "Together for Better"
- Location in the state of Nevada

- Nevada in the United States
- Coordinates: 36°21′N 115°05′W
- Country: United States
- State: Nevada
- Annexed from Arizona Territory: January 18, 1867
- Formed from Lincoln County: July 1, 1909
- Named for: William A. Clark
- County seat: Las Vegas
- Largest city (population): Las Vegas
- Largest city (area): Boulder City

Government
  - Type: Council–Manager
  - Chair: Michael Naft
  - Vice Chair: William McCurdy II
  - Clark County Commission: Commissioners: Michael Naft; Marilyn Kirkpatrick; April Becker; William McCurdy II; Tick Segerblom; Justin Jones; James B. Gibson
  - County Manager: Kevin Schiller

Area
  - Total: 8,061 sq mi (20,880 km^{2})
  - Land: 7,891 sq mi (20,440 km^{2})
  - Water: 170 sq mi (440 km^{2}) 2.1%
- Lowest elevation: 492 ft (150 m)

Population (2020)
  - Total: 2,265,461
  - Estimate (2025): 2,407,226 ▲
  - Density: 287.1/sq mi (110.8/km^{2})

GDP
  - Total: $195.936 billion (2024)
- Time zone: UTC−8 (Pacific Time Zone)
  - Summer (DST): UTC−7 (Pacific Daylight Time)
- FIPS code: 003-32003
- Website: clarkcountynv.gov

Clark County is the southernmost and most populous county in the U.S. state of Nevada, with 2,265,461 residents as of the 2020 census. The county is the location of the state's three largest cities, Las Vegas (the county seat), Henderson, and North Las Vegas, as well as the Las Vegas Strip, Nellis Air Force Base, and Hoover Dam. Clark County has 8,061 square miles (20,880 km^{2}) of land area, roughly the size of New Jersey. In total, the county has five incorporated cities and 21 unincorporated towns, and 11 judicial townships.

Although the county has 70% of Nevada's population making it the 11th-most populous county in the United States, Clark County covers only 7% of Nevada's land mass. Despite having the name Las Vegas as part of their address, over 1 million residents live in unincorporated Clark County, with municipal services provided by the county. The county plays a role much larger than is typical in the US as it has direct jurisdiction over the Las Vegas Strip and such a large population. (Note: If the unincorporated area and towns of Clark County formed their own city, it would be the largest in the state, dwarfing Las Vegas with around 400,000 more residents.)

Clark County is governed by the Clark County Commission as its partisan, seven member elected body which enacts ordinances and appoints the county manager to administer the ordinances and daily operations of the county. The Las Vegas Metropolitan Police Department is a combined city-county law enforcement agency with jurisdiction over all Clark County, resulting from the merger between the city of Las Vegas’ police department and the county sheriff's office.

Originally occupied by the Southern Paiute people and others, the area became part of the Mexican territory of Alta California—then after the Mexican-American War part of the United States—first as part of the New Mexico Territory, and later the Arizona Territory, before becoming part of Nevada as Lincoln County. Clark County was formed from the southern portion of Lincoln on July 1, 1909.

== History ==
Las Vegas, the state's most populous city, has been the county seat since its establishment. The county was formed by the Nevada Legislature by splitting off a portion of Lincoln County on February 5, 1909, and was organized on July 1, 1909. The Las Vegas Valley, a 600-square-mile (1,600 km^{2}) basin, includes Las Vegas and other major cities and communities such as North Las Vegas, Henderson, and the unincorporated community of Paradise.

Native Americans lived in the Las Vegas Valley beginning over 10,000 years ago. Paiutes moved into the area as early as AD 700. Previously part of the Mexican Territory of Alta California, the Clark County lands were subsequently traversed by American beaver trappers. Word of their journeys inspired the New Mexican merchant Antonio Armijo in 1829 to establish the first route for mule trains and herds of livestock from Nuevo Mexico to Alta California through the area, along the Virgin and Colorado Rivers. Called the Armijo Route of the Old Spanish Trail, the route was later modified into the Main Route by the passing merchants, trappers, drovers, Ute raiders and settlers over the years by moving to a more direct route. In Clark County it was northward away from the Colorado to a series of creeks, waterholes and springs like those at Las Vegas, to which John C. Frémont added Frémont's Cutoff on his return from California to Utah in 1844.

What is now Clark County was acquired by the United States during the Mexican–American War, becoming part of the northwestern corner of New Mexico Territory. In 1847, Jefferson Hunt and other Mormon Battalion members returning to Salt Lake City from Los Angeles pioneered a wagon route through the County that became the Mormon Road. In 1849, this road became known as the "Southern Route", the winter route of the California Trail from Salt Lake City to Los Angeles during the California Gold Rush. By the mid-1850s, the route now known as the Salt Lake Road in California, and the California Road in Utah Territory, was a wagon trade route between the two. In the mid-1850s, Mormons established a Mormon Fort at Las Vegas. In the 1860s, Mormon colonies were established along the Virgin and Muddy Rivers.

Before Nevada became a state, the county was part of Mohave County in the Arizona Territory. In 1865, it became part of territorial Arizona's Pah-Ute County. The part of Pah-Ute County north and west of the Colorado River was annexed by Congress for Nevada in 1866; however, Arizona territory fought the division until 1871. Pah-Ute County would go on to form the entirety of what is now Clark County, in addition to parts of Esmeralda, Nye, and Lincoln Counties.

Clark County was named for William A. Clark, a Montana copper magnate and Democratic U.S. Senator. Clark was largely responsible for construction of the San Pedro, Los Angeles and Salt Lake Railroad through the area, contributing to the region's early development. Clark County is a major tourist destination with 150,000 hotel rooms. The Las Vegas Strip, home to many famous hotel-casinos, is not within Las Vegas city limits, but in the unincorporated town of Paradise. It is, however, in the Las Vegas Valley.

For most statistical purposes, Clark County is coextensive with the Las Vegas Valley, which is the primary urban core of the county, including the Bureau of Labor Statistics Las Vegas-Henderson-North Las Vegas, NV region Over time and influenced by climate change, droughts in Southern Nevada have been increasing in frequency and severity, putting a further strain on Clark County's and Las Vegas's water security.

== Geography ==
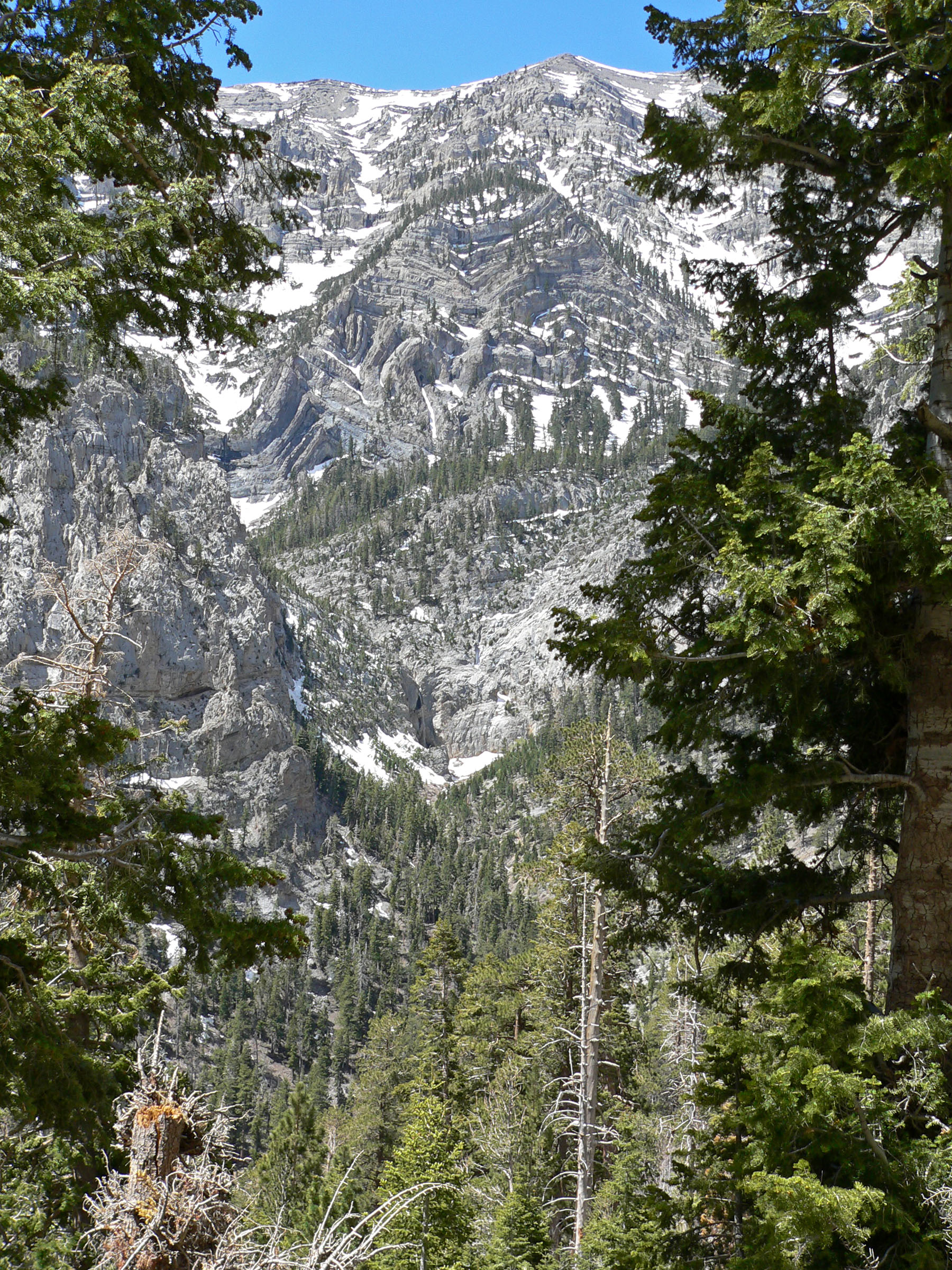
Kyle Canyon in the Mount Charleston Wilderness

The Colorado River forms the county's southeastern boundary, with Hoover Dam forming Lake Mead along much of its length. The lowest point in the state of Nevada is on the Colorado River just south of Laughlin in Clark County, where it flows out of Nevada into California and Arizona. Greater Las Vegas is a tectonic valley, surrounded by four mountain ranges, with nearby Mount Charleston being the highest elevation at 11,918 ft (3,633 m), located to the northwest. Other than the forests on Mount Charleston, the geography in Clark County is a desert. Creosote bushes are the main native vegetation, and the mountains are mostly rocky with little vegetation. The terrain slopes to the south and east. The county has an area of 8,061 sq mi (20,880 km^{2}), of which 7,891 sq mi (20,440 km^{2}) is land and 170 sq mi (440 km^{2}) (2.1%) is water.

=== Adjacent counties ===
- Lincoln County – north
- Mohave County, Arizona – east (observes Mountain Time)
- San Bernardino County, California – south
- Inyo County, California – northwest
- Nye County – west

=== National protected areas ===
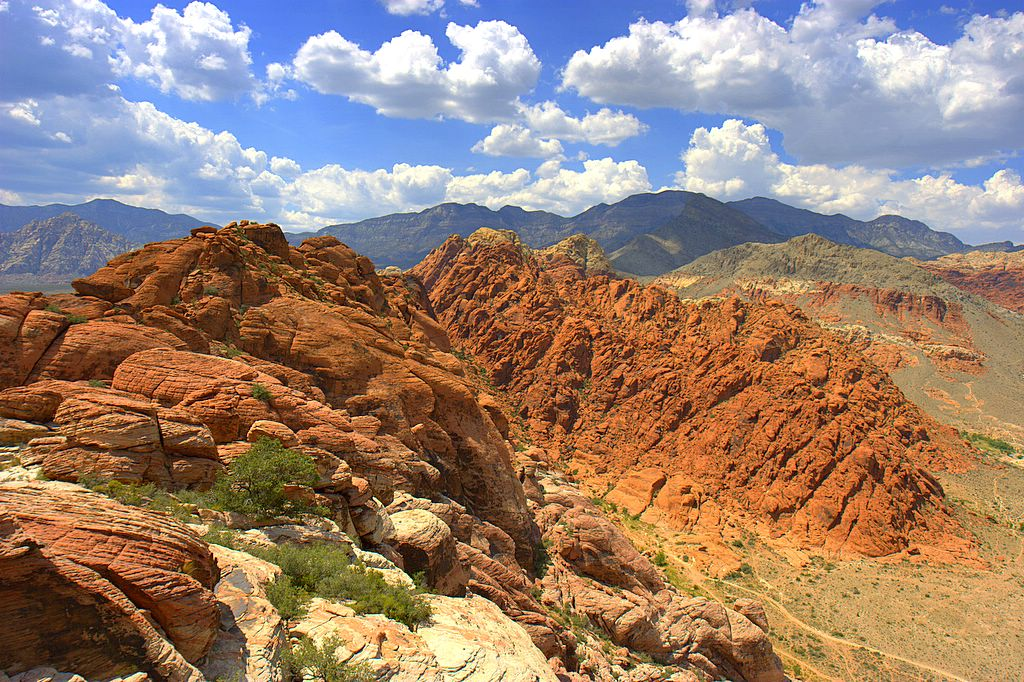
Calico basin in Red Rock Canyon National Conservation Area

- Avi Kwa Ame National Monument
- Desert National Wildlife Refuge (part)
- Humboldt-Toiyabe National Forest (part)
- Lake Mead National Recreation Area (part)
- Moapa Valley National Wildlife Refuge
- Red Rock Canyon National Conservation Area
- Sloan Canyon National Conservation Area
- Spring Mountains National Recreation Area (part)
- Toiyabe National Forest (part)
- Tule Springs Fossil Beds National Monument (part)

Twenty official wilderness areas in Clark County are part of the National Wilderness Preservation System. Many of these are in, or partially in, one of the preceding protected areas, as shown below. Many are separate entities that are managed by the Bureau of Land Management (BLM):

- Arrow Canyon Wilderness (BLM)
- Black Canyon Wilderness (Nevada) (Lake Mead National Recreational Area [NRA])
- Bridge Canyon Wilderness (Lake Mead NRA)
- Eldorado Wilderness (Lake Mead NRA / BLM)
- Ireteba Peaks Wilderness (Lake Mead NRA / BLM)
- Jimbilnan Wilderness (Lake Mead NRA)
- Jumbo Springs Wilderness (BLM)
- La Madre Mountain Wilderness (BLM / Toiyabe National Forest [NF])
- Lime Canyon Wilderness (BLM)
- Meadow Valley Range Wilderness (BLM) mostly in Lincoln County, Nevada
- Mormon Mountains Wilderness (BLM) mostly in Lincoln County, Nevada
- Mount Charleston Wilderness (Toiyabe NF / BLM)
- Muddy Mountains Wilderness (BLM / Lake Mead NRA)
- Nellis Wash Wilderness (Lake Mead NRA)
- North McCullough Wilderness (part of Sloan Canyon NCA, which is managed by BLM)
- Pinto Valley Wilderness (Lake Mead NRA)
- Rainbow Mountain Wilderness (BLM / Toiyabe NF)
- South McCullough Wilderness (BLM)
- Spirit Mountain Wilderness (Lake Mead NRA / BLM)
- Wee Thump Joshua Tree Wilderness (BLM)

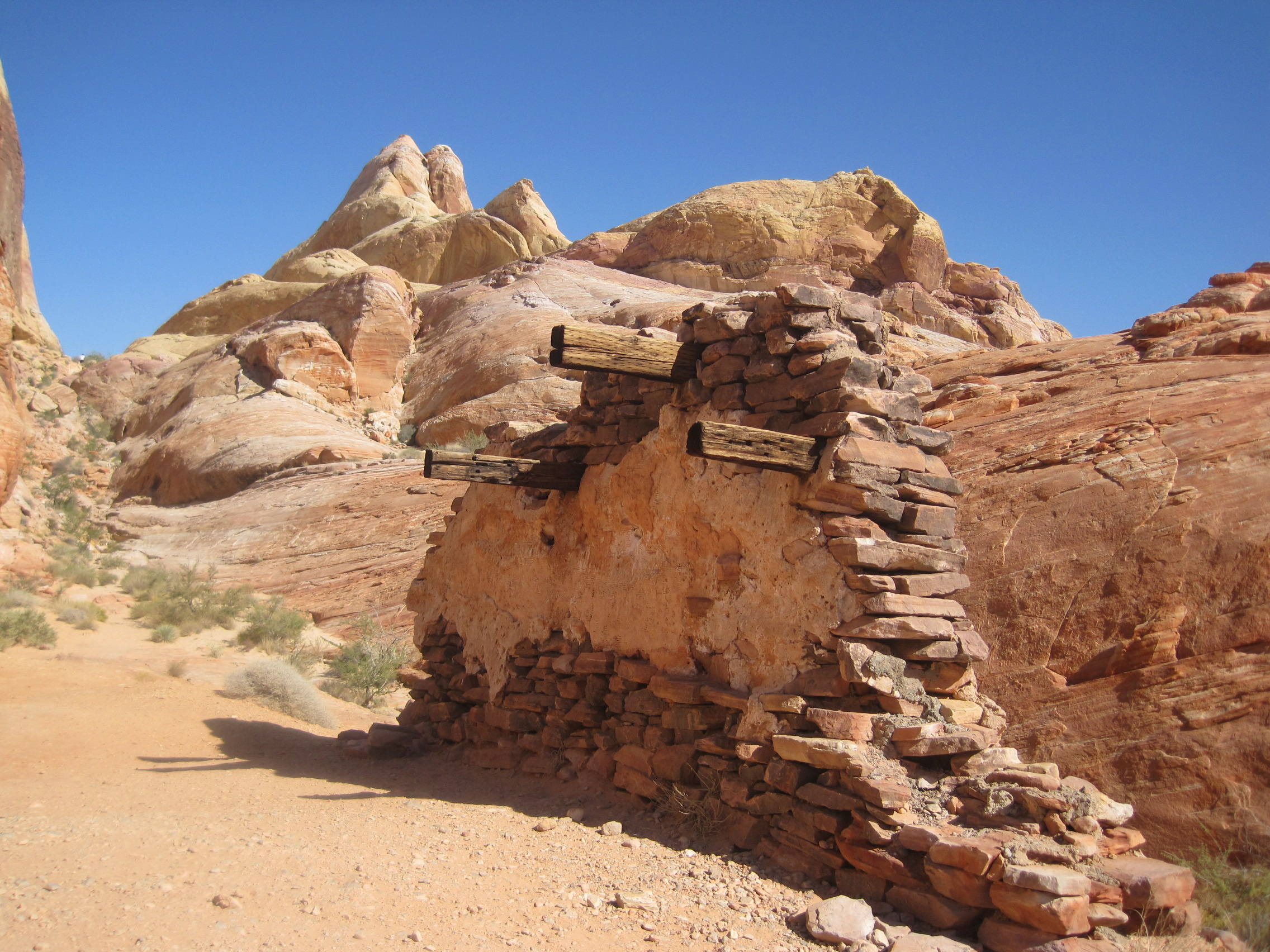
White Domes trail, Valley of Fire State Park, in NE Clark County

=== Environmental factors ===
Clark County has diverse desert flora and fauna, including higher-elevation mountain areas, the desert floor, and the Colorado River/Lake Mead ecosystems. Variations in diurnal temperature as well as seasonal swings in temperature create demanding adaptation elements on the species of this county. Population expansion, especially since 1970, has placed additional pressure on species in the area.

Correspondingly, air quality levels prior to the 1960s were in a favorable range, but the proliferation of automobiles with the human population expansion created circumstances where some federal air quality standards were violated starting in the 1980s.

To plan for the wave of development forecast by 1980, Clark County embarked on a regional environmental impact assessment funded by a federal Section 208 program, with Sedway-Cooke conducting the planning work and Earth Metrics performing environmental analysis. This endeavor projected population growth, land use changes and environmental impacts.

To prevent the loss of federal funds due to unacceptable dust levels in the Las Vegas valley, in 2003 the Nevada Air Quality Management division (under direction of Clark County officials) created the "Don't Be a Dusthole" campaign. The campaign successfully raised awareness of dust pollution in the Las Vegas Valley, quantifiably reducing pollutants and preserving ongoing federal funding.

The Apex landfill, at 2,200 acres (890 ha), is the nation's largest landfill. Republic Services owns and operates the landfill.

=== Earthquake hazards ===
Nevada is the third most seismically active state in the U.S. (after Alaska and California); the United States Geological Survey has estimated that over the next 50 years, Clark County has a 10–20% chance of a (moment magnitude) M6.0 or greater earthquake occurring within 31 mi (50 km) of Las Vegas.

== Demographics ==
Race / Ethnicity (NH = Non-Hispanic)	Pop 1980	Pop 1990	Pop 2000	Pop 2010	Pop 2020	% 1980	% 1990	% 2000	% 2010	% 2020
White alone (NH)	368,153	558,875	828,669	935,955	892,802	79.50%	75.38%	60.23%	47.97%	39.41%
Black or African American alone (NH)	45,802	68,858	121,401	194,821	275,002	9.89%	9.29%	8.82%	9.98%	12.14%
Native American or Alaska Native alone (NH)	3,041	5,514	7,761	8,732	8,487	0.66%	0.74%	0.56%	0.45%	0.37%
Asian alone (NH)	9,207	24,483	71,226	165,121	231,972	1.99%	3.30%	5.18%	8.46%	10.24%
Native Hawaiian or Pacific Islander alone (NH)	x	x	5,864	12,474	18,877	x	x	0.43%	0.64%	0.83%
Other race alone (NH)	1,798	825	2,019	3,719	12,890	0.39%	0.11%	0.15%	0.19%	0.57%
Mixed race or Multiracial (NH)	x	x	36,682	61,803	124,015	x	x	2.67%	3.17%	5.47%
Hispanic or Latino (any race)	35,086	82,904	302,143	568,644	701,416	7.58%	11.18%	21.96%	29.14%	30.96%
Total	463,087	741,459	1,375,765	1,951,269	2,265,461	100.00%	100.00%	100.00%	100.00%	100.00%

Historical population
Census	Pop.	Note	%±
1910	3,321		—
1920	4,859		46.3%
1930	8,532		75.6%
1940	16,414		92.4%
1950	48,289		194.2%
1960	127,016		163.0%
1970	273,288		115.2%
1980	463,087		69.5%
1990	741,459		60.1%
2000	1,375,765		85.5%
2010	1,951,269		41.8%
2020	2,265,461		16.1%
2025 (est.)	2,407,226	▲	6.3%
US Decennial Census; 1790–1960 1900–1990; 1990–2000 2010–2020

=== Racial and ethnic composition ===
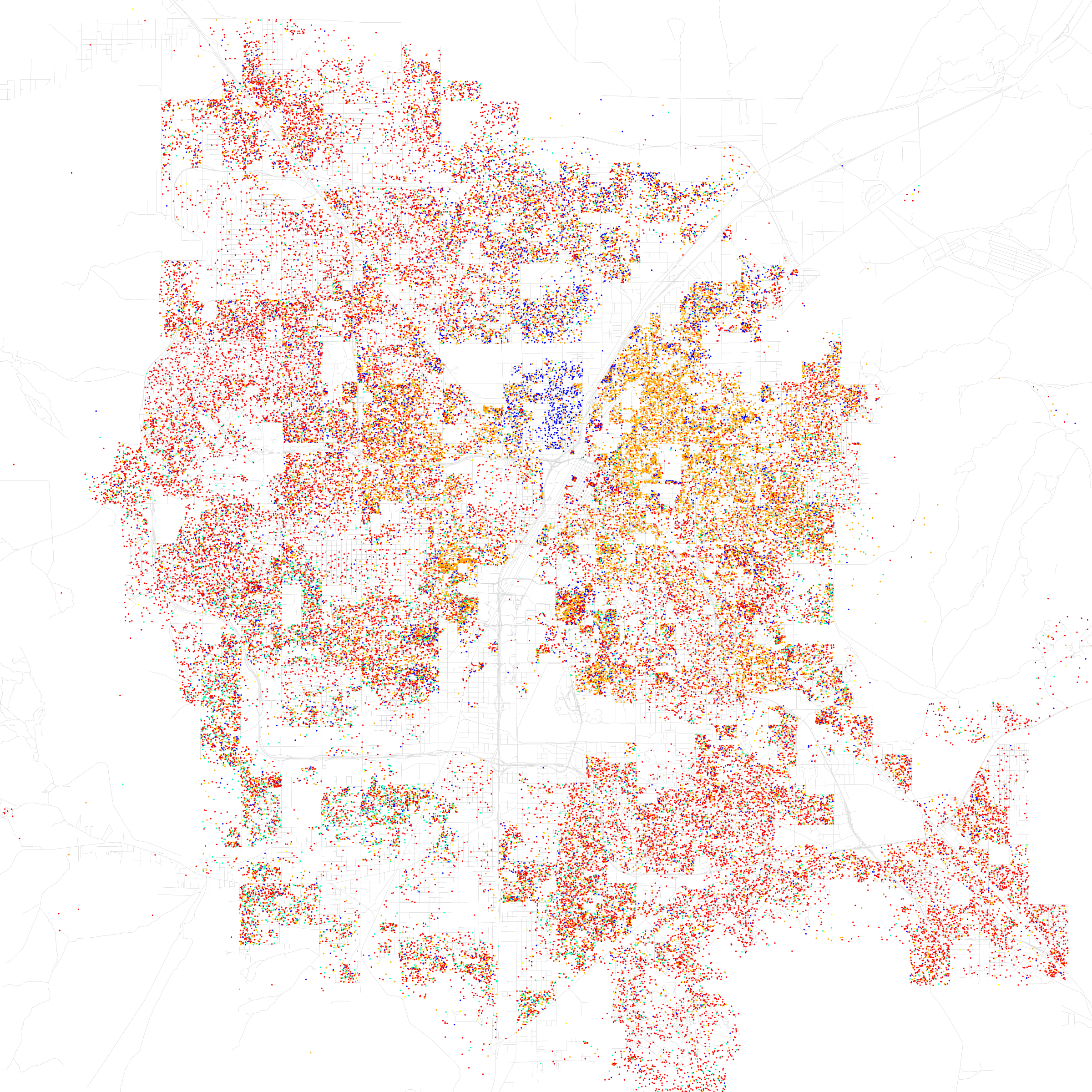
Map of racial distribution, 2010 Census. Each dot is 25 people: White, Black, Asian, Hispanic, or Other (yellow).

=== 2022 American Community Survey ===
The largest ancestries in the county were Mexican (23.2%), German (7.4%), Filipino (6.8%), English (6.8%), Irish (6.2%), and Italian (4.5%).

=== 2020 census ===
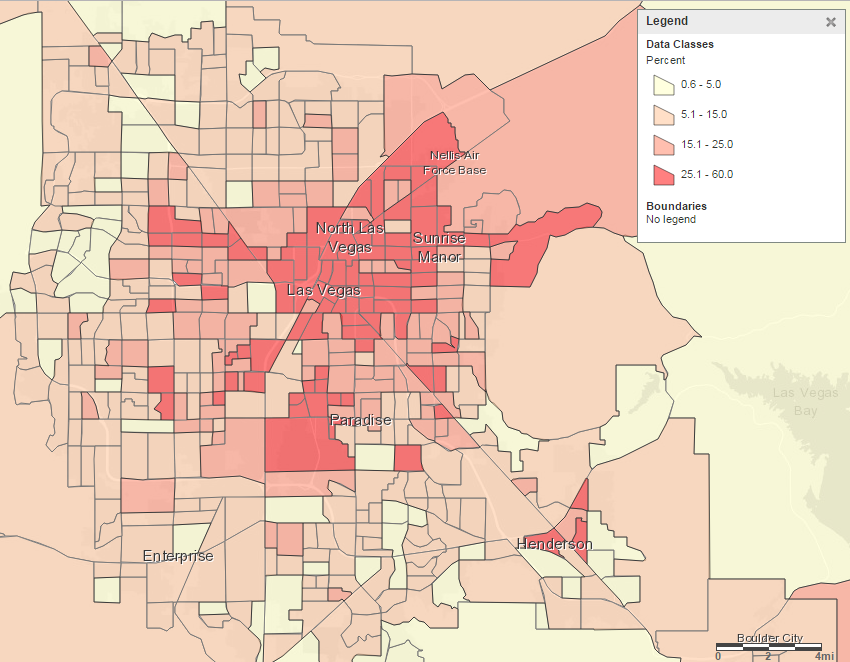
2018 population living below federal poverty line by census tracts.

As of the 2020 census, the county had a population of 2,265,461. The median age was 38.0 years. 22.7% of residents were under the age of 18 and 15.3% of residents were 65 years of age or older. For every 100 females there were 98.9 males, and for every 100 females age 18 and over there were 97.1 males age 18 and over. 98.7% of residents lived in urban areas, while 1.3% lived in rural areas.

2015 income distribution by household in Las Vegas.

The racial makeup of the county was 44.9% White, 12.7% Black or African American, 1.0% American Indian and Alaska Native, 10.5% Asian, 0.9% Native Hawaiian and Pacific Islander, 15.4% from some other race, and 14.7% from two or more races. Hispanic or Latino residents of any race comprised 31.0% of the population.

There were 845,888 households in the county, of which 31.6% had children under the age of 18 living with them and 27.2% had a female householder with no spouse or partner present. About 26.2% of all households were made up of individuals and 9.4% had someone living alone who was 65 years of age or older.

There were 917,656 housing units, of which 7.8% were vacant. Among occupied housing units, 54.3% were owner-occupied and 45.7% were renter-occupied. The homeowner vacancy rate was 1.5% and the rental vacancy rate was 8.1%.

=== 2010 census ===
As of the 2010 United States census, there were 1,951,269 people, 715,365 households, and 467,916 families in the county. The population density was 247.3 inhabitants per square mile (95.5/km^{2}). There were 840,343 housing units at an average density of 106.5 per square mile (41.1/km^{2}). The racial makeup of the county was 60.9% White, 13.5% Black or African American, 8.7% Asian, 0.7% Pacific islander, 0.7% American Indian, 10.5% from other races, and 5.1% from two or more races. Those of Hispanic or Latino origin made up 29.1% of the population. In terms of European/white ancestries, 11.7% were German, 9.1% were Irish, 7.6% were English, 6.3% were Italian, and 2.7% were American.

Of the 715,365 households, 34.9% had children under the age of 18 living with them, 45.0% were married couples living together, 13.5% had a female householder with no husband present, 34.6% were non-families, and 25.3% of all households were made up of individuals. The average household size was 2.70 and the average family size was 3.26. The median age was 35.5 years.

The median income for a household in the county was $56,258 and the median income for a family was $63,888. Males had a median income of $43,693 versus $35,324 for females. The per capita income for the county was $27,422. About 8.7% of families and 11.7% of the population were below the poverty line, including 16.9% of those under age 18 and 7.6% of those age 65 or over.

=== 2000 census ===
In 2000 there were 512,253 households, out of which 31.7% had children under the age of 18 living with them, 48.7% were married couples living together, 11.8% had a female householder with no husband present, and 33.7% were non-families. 24.5% of all households were made up of individuals, and 6.7% had someone living alone who was above age 64. The average household size was 2.65 and the average family size was 3.17.

The county population contained 25.6% under the age of 18, 9.2% from 18 to 24, 32.2% from 25 to 44, 22.3% from 45 to 64, and 10.7% who were over age 64. The median age was 34 years. For every 100 females there were 103.50 males. For every 100 females age 18 and over, there were 102.80 males.

The median income for a household in the county was $53,536, and the median income for a family was $59,485. Males had a median income of $35,243 versus $27,077 for females. The per capita income for the county was $21,785. About 7.9% of families and 10.8% of the population were below the poverty line, including 14.1% of those under age 18 and 7.3% of those over age 64.

Large numbers of new residents in the state originate from California.

== Economy ==
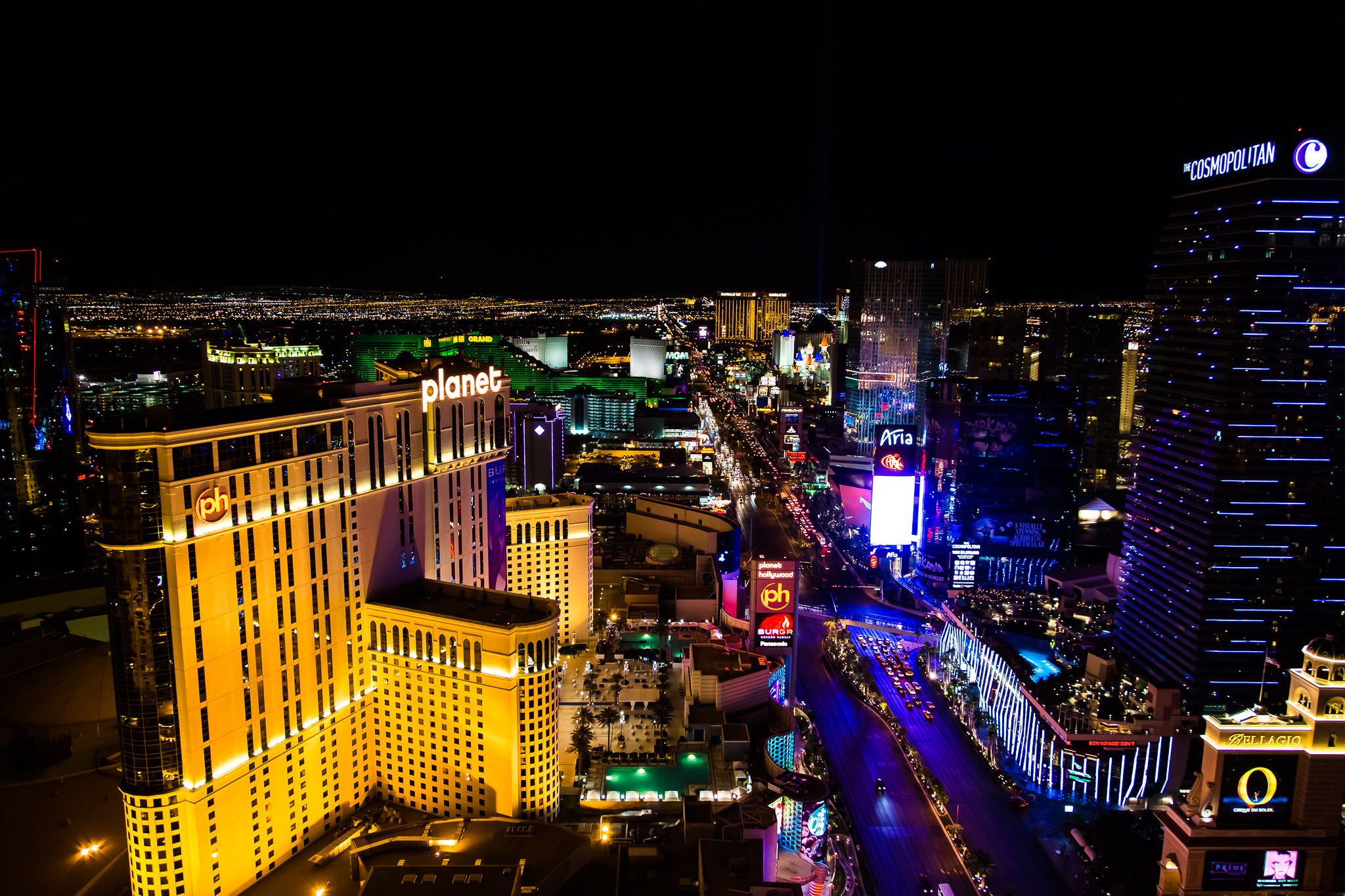
The Las Vegas Strip looking south

The county is home to many gaming-related companies including Golden Entertainment, American Casino & Entertainment Properties, Bally Technologies, Cannery Casino Resorts, The Majestic Star Casino, LLC, Ameristar Casinos, Archon Corporation, Boyd Gaming, Las Vegas Sands, MGM Resorts International, Wynn Resorts, DBT Online Inc., Two Plus Two Publishing, Gambler's Book Shop / GBC Press, Station Casinos, Millennium Management Group, Navegante Group, Pinnacle Entertainment and Tropicana Entertainment.

=== Largest employers ===
According to data collected by the Research and Analysis Bureau of the Nevada Department of Employment, Training and Rehabilitation, Clark County's largest employers, both public and private employers, as reported in the fourth quarter of 2012:

30,000 to 39,999 employees

- Clark County School District

5,000 to 10,000 employees

- Clark County Government
- Nellis Air Force Base
- Wynn Las Vegas
- Bellagio
- MGM Grand Las Vegas
- Aria Resort & Casino
- Mandalay Bay Resort and Casino
- Caesars Palace
- Las Vegas Metropolitan Police Department
- University of Nevada, Las Vegas

2,500 to 4,999

- The Venetian Las Vegas
- The Mirage
- The Cosmopolitan of Las Vegas
- University Medical Center of Southern Nevada
- The Palazzo
- Encore Las Vegas
- Flamingo Las Vegas
- Southwest Airlines
- City of Las Vegas municipal Government
- Paris Las Vegas

=== Gaming areas ===
The State of Nevada divides the state into several gaming districts. Accordingly, the Clark County is divided into the following reporting districts:

- Boulder Strip: This region includes 33 casinos on Boulder Highway. Casinos within the Henderson city limits are included as well, such as Green Valley Ranch, Sunset Station, The Pass, and Jokers Wild.
- Downtown: There are 19 casinos in this reporting area.
- LV Strip: This region is composed of all the casinos on Las Vegas Boulevard, from The Stratosphere at the north end to Mandalay Bay on the south end. Also included are resorts near this area, such as The Rio, South Point, and the Virgin; and Harry Reid International Airport (formerly McCarran Airport).
- North Las Vegas: This region has 11 casinos and includes the Cannery, Jerry's Nugget, and the Santa Fe Station.
- Laughlin: The casinos in Laughlin.
- Mesquite: The casinos in Mesquite.
- Balance of County: As of 2008, there are 66 casinos in this category that includes casinos at Lake Las Vegas, Jean, Primm, the Railroad Pass and Hacienda casinos, along with other casinos that do not fit any other category such as Arizona Charlie's Decatur, Gold Coast, The Orleans, Palms, Suncoast, Rampart, and Red Rock Resort Spa and Casino.

== Government ==
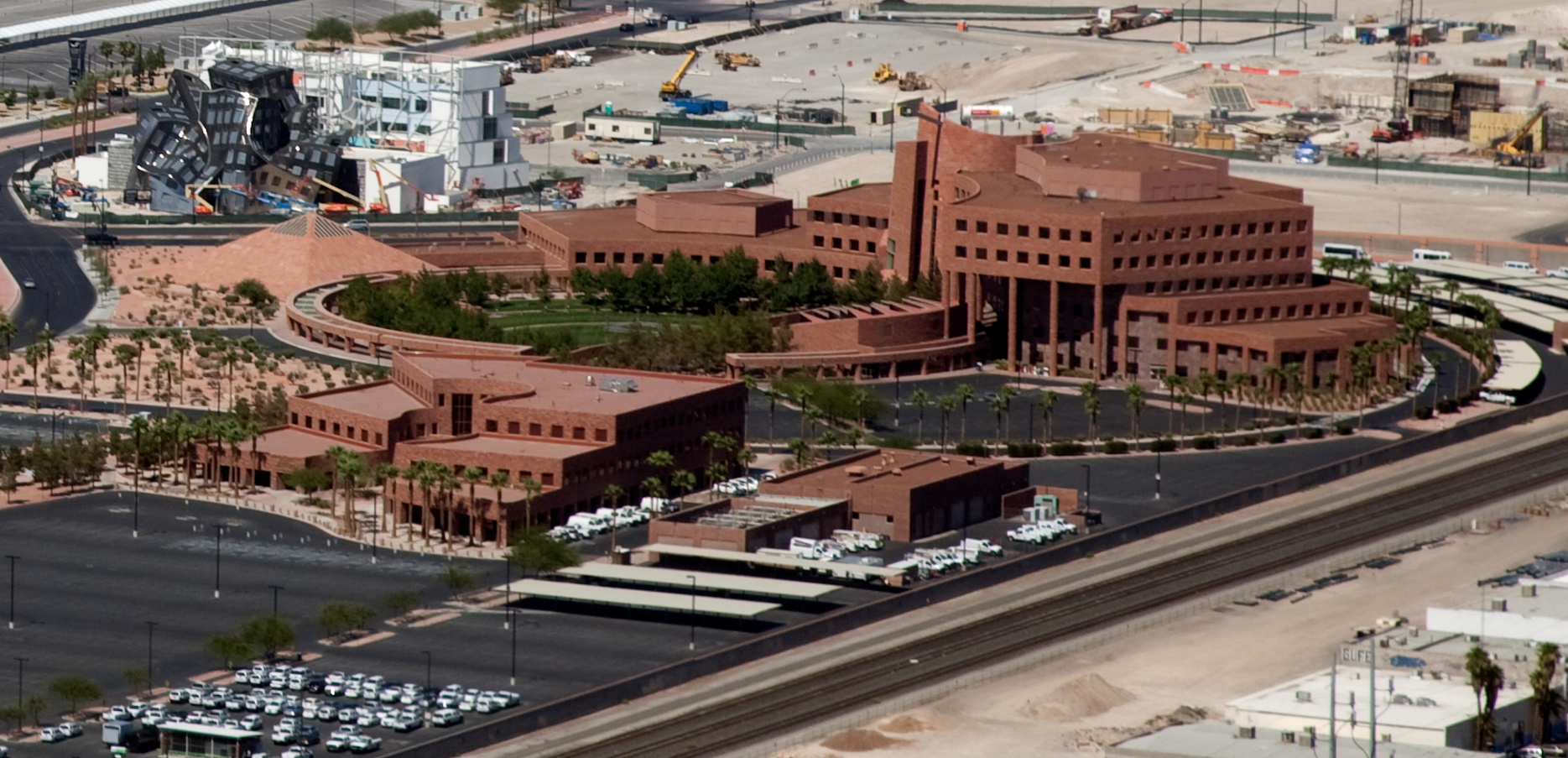
Clark County Government Center which is home to the chambers of the Clark County Commission and most county offices.

The Clark County Commission consists of seven members who are elected to serve staggered four-year terms in biennial partisan elections. The commission members elect a chairman, who chairs their meetings. A hired county manager handles day-to-day operations under direction of the commission. The county's unincorporated towns also have appointed boards that provide advice to the commission.

The county operates out of the Clark County Government Center in the City of Las Vegas. The building is unusual in shape, and includes an outdoor amphitheater for concerts and other events.

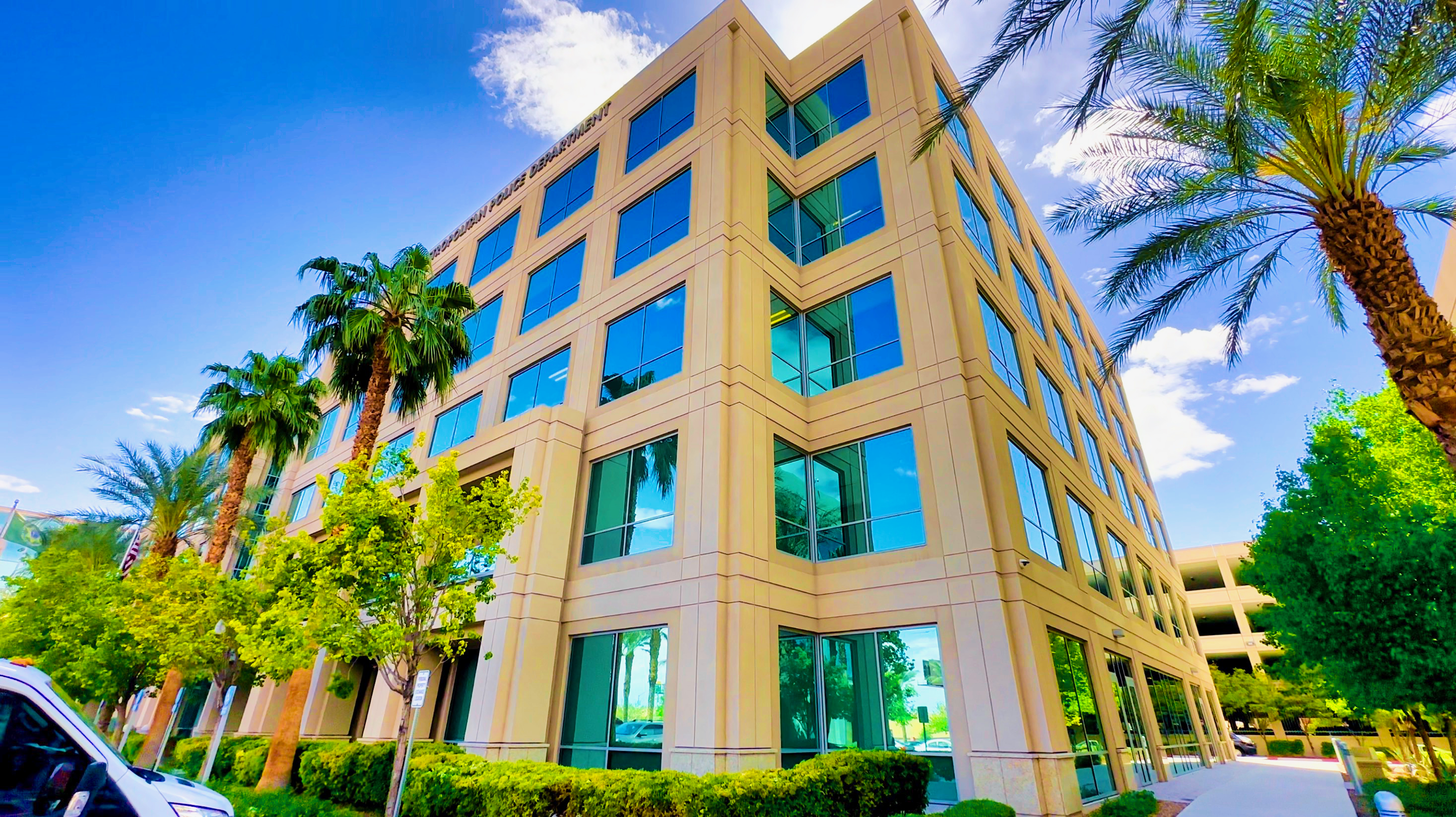
Las Vegas Metropolitan Police Department headquarters

Clark County Detention Center

The Las Vegas Metropolitan Police Department provides most law enforcement services in the county, including operation of the county's central jail, the Clark County Detention Center. The present department was created in 1973 when the Clark County Sheriff's Department merged with the Las Vegas Police Department.

Other entities with police forces include University of Nevada, Las Vegas, the College of Southern Nevada, the Clark County School District, and cities of Henderson, Mesquite, Boulder City and North Las Vegas. The Clark County Office of Public Safety (formerly Clark County Park Police) is responsible for policing all buildings and parks operated by the county and some selected special venues, such as the Clark County Amphitheater, Clark County Archery Range, and the Desert Rose Golf Course.

The Regional Justice Center replaced the Clark County Courthouse in 2005, and is about 3 blocks from downtown Fremont Street, at 200 Lewis Avenue.

=== Courts ===
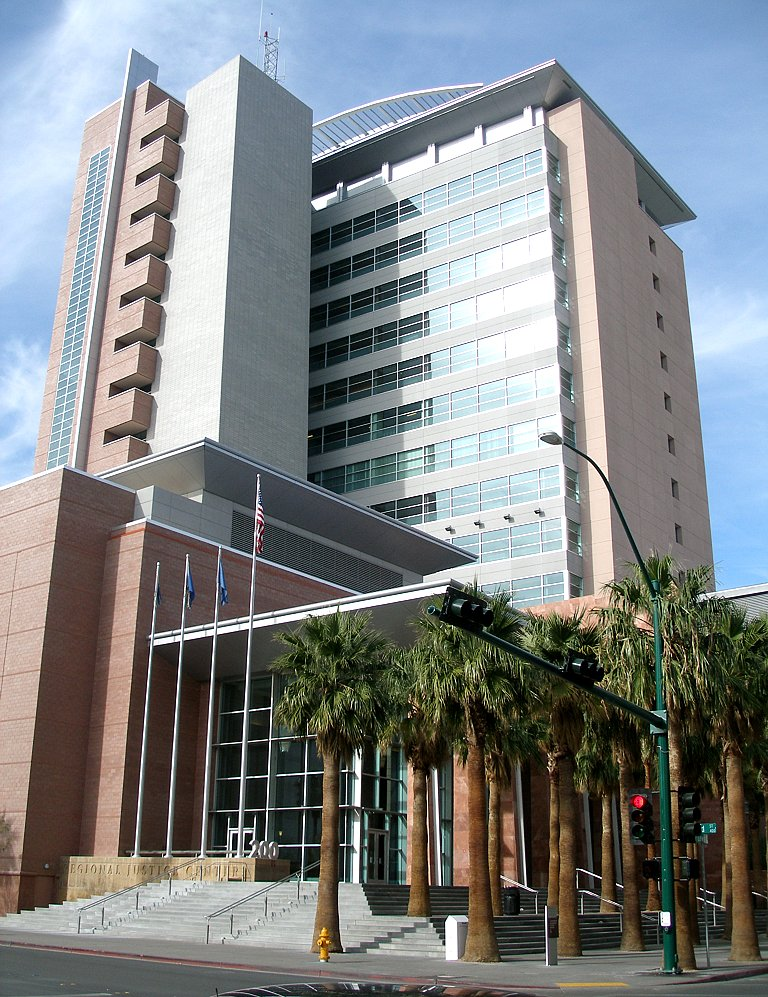
Regional Justice Center

Justice courts in Nevada are courts of limited jurisdiction but are considered county-level courts. Each elects its own justices of the peace for limited jurisdiction cases and a constable. There are 11 judicial townships in Clark County, including:

- Boulder City
- Bunkerville
- Goodsprings
- Henderson
- Las Vegas
- Laughlin
- Mesquite
- Moapa
- Moapa Valley
- North Las Vegas
- Searchlight

The Clark County Marshalls provides security for Clark County courts.

=== Voter registration ===
According to the secretary of state's office, Independents comprise a plurality of registered voters in Clark County.

Clark County Voter Registrations as of August 2026
Political Party	Total Voters	Percentage
Nonpartisan	610,333	40.76%
Democratic	440,358	29.41%
Republican	356,149	23.79%
Independent American	57,696	3.85%
Libertarian	8,720	0.58%
Other	24,065	1.61%
Total	1,497,321	100.00%

=== Politics ===
United States presidential election results for Clark County, Nevada
Year	Republican		Democratic		Third party(ies)	
Year	No.	%	No.	%	No.	%
1912	110	13.14%	358	42.77%	369	44.09%
1916	529	28.55%	1,115	60.17%	209	11.28%
1920	589	44.62%	620	46.97%	111	8.41%
1924	533	32.58%	288	17.60%	815	49.82%
1928	1,284	56.61%	984	43.39%	0	0.00%
1932	1,347	18.75%	5,837	81.25%	0	0.00%
1936	1,178	18.79%	5,091	81.21%	0	0.00%
1940	2,170	29.63%	5,154	70.37%	0	0.00%
1944	4,543	38.20%	7,350	61.80%	0	0.00%
1948	6,382	36.57%	10,787	61.81%	284	1.63%
1952	13,333	52.93%	11,855	47.07%	0	0.00%
1956	18,584	49.32%	19,095	50.68%	0	0.00%
1960	18,197	43.18%	23,949	56.82%	0	0.00%
1964	23,921	36.98%	40,760	63.02%	0	0.00%
1968	31,522	41.99%	33,225	44.26%	10,318	13.75%
1972	53,101	59.06%	36,807	40.94%	0	0.00%
1976	48,236	46.92%	51,178	49.78%	3,398	3.31%
1980	76,194	59.80%	38,313	30.07%	12,917	10.14%
1984	94,133	62.60%	53,386	35.50%	2,844	1.89%
1988	108,110	56.37%	78,359	40.86%	5,310	2.77%
1992	97,403	32.17%	124,586	41.15%	80,793	26.68%
1996	103,431	39.37%	127,963	48.71%	31,316	11.92%
2000	170,932	44.72%	196,100	51.31%	15,166	3.97%
2004	255,337	46.82%	281,767	51.66%	8,293	1.52%
2008	257,078	39.48%	380,765	58.47%	13,329	2.05%
2012	289,053	41.82%	389,936	56.42%	12,201	1.77%
2016	320,057	41.72%	402,227	52.43%	44,872	5.85%
2020	430,930	44.31%	521,852	53.66%	19,728	2.03%
2024	493,052	47.81%	520,187	50.44%	17,984	1.74%

United States Senate election results for Clark County, Nevada1
Year	Republican		Democratic		Third party(ies)	
Year	No.	%	No.	%	No.	%
2024	441,057	43.46%	514,662	50.71%	59,118	5.83%

With nearly three-quarters of Nevada's population, Clark County plays a significant role in determining statewide Nevada elections as well the winner of the state's electoral votes in presidential elections. At the presidential level, the county, like most urban counties nationwide, leans Democratic. The last Republican to carry the county was George H. W. Bush in 1988. However, it is somewhat less Democratic than many other urban counties; the GOP candidate has received at least 39 percent of the vote in every election since 1996. In 2024, Republican Donald Trump came the closest to winning Clark County since 1988, winning 47.81% of the vote.

This Democratic trend predates the county's explosive growth in the second half of the 20th century. Republican presidential candidates have only won the county six times from 1912 to the present day, all coming in national landslides where the Republican won over 400 electoral votes.

At the statewide level, however, the county is more of a swing county, with several Republican gubernatorial candidates and U.S. Senators winning the county since the late 1980s. The last Republican senator to win the county was John Ensign in his 2006 victory, even as Jim Gibbons lost it in his gubernatorial win over Dina Titus that year. Both Kenny Guinn and Brian Sandoval carried the county in both gubernatorial terms they won, however. Republican Joe Lombardo, who previously served as Clark County sheriff, won the 2022 Nevada gubernatorial election while losing the county by 5.7%.

In 2018, Dean Heller carried 15 of Nevada's 17 county-level jurisdictions in his bid for a second full term in the U. S. Senate. However, Democratic challenger Jacky Rosen won Clark by over 92,000 votes, almost double her statewide margin of 48,000 votes. In that year's gubernatorial election, Democrat Steve Sisolak lost 15 out of 17 county-level jurisdictions, but won Clark by enough of a margin to get the victory. Between 2008 and 2024, the Democratic presidential candidate won Clark by more than enough votes to carry Nevada, a trend which ended in 2024 where Trump won the state as a whole, largely due to a weak Democratic performance in the county.

The city of Las Vegas itself leans Democratic, as do the communities of Paradise, Spring Valley and Enterprise. The city of North Las Vegas and the communities of Sunrise Manor, Winchester and Whitney are more strongly Democratic, while the city of Henderson and the Summerlin South community have a Republican lean. Boulder City, where gambling is prohibited, leans Republican. Outside Las Vegas Valley, the county leans Republican.

=== Regional agencies ===
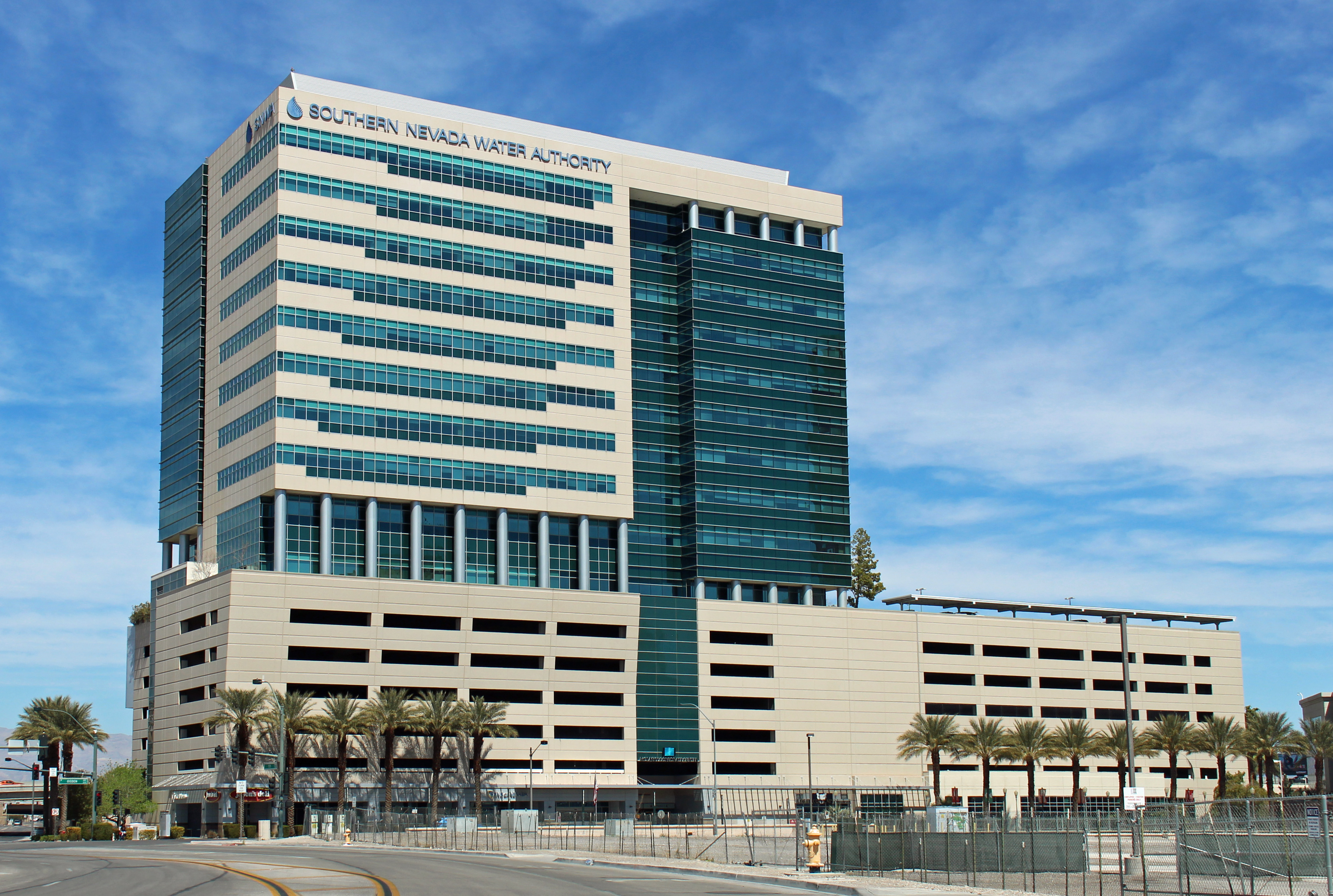
Southern Nevada Water Authority

The Clark County Regional Flood Control District (CCRFCD) was created in 1985 by the Nevada Legislature allowing Clark County to provide broad solutions to flooding problems.

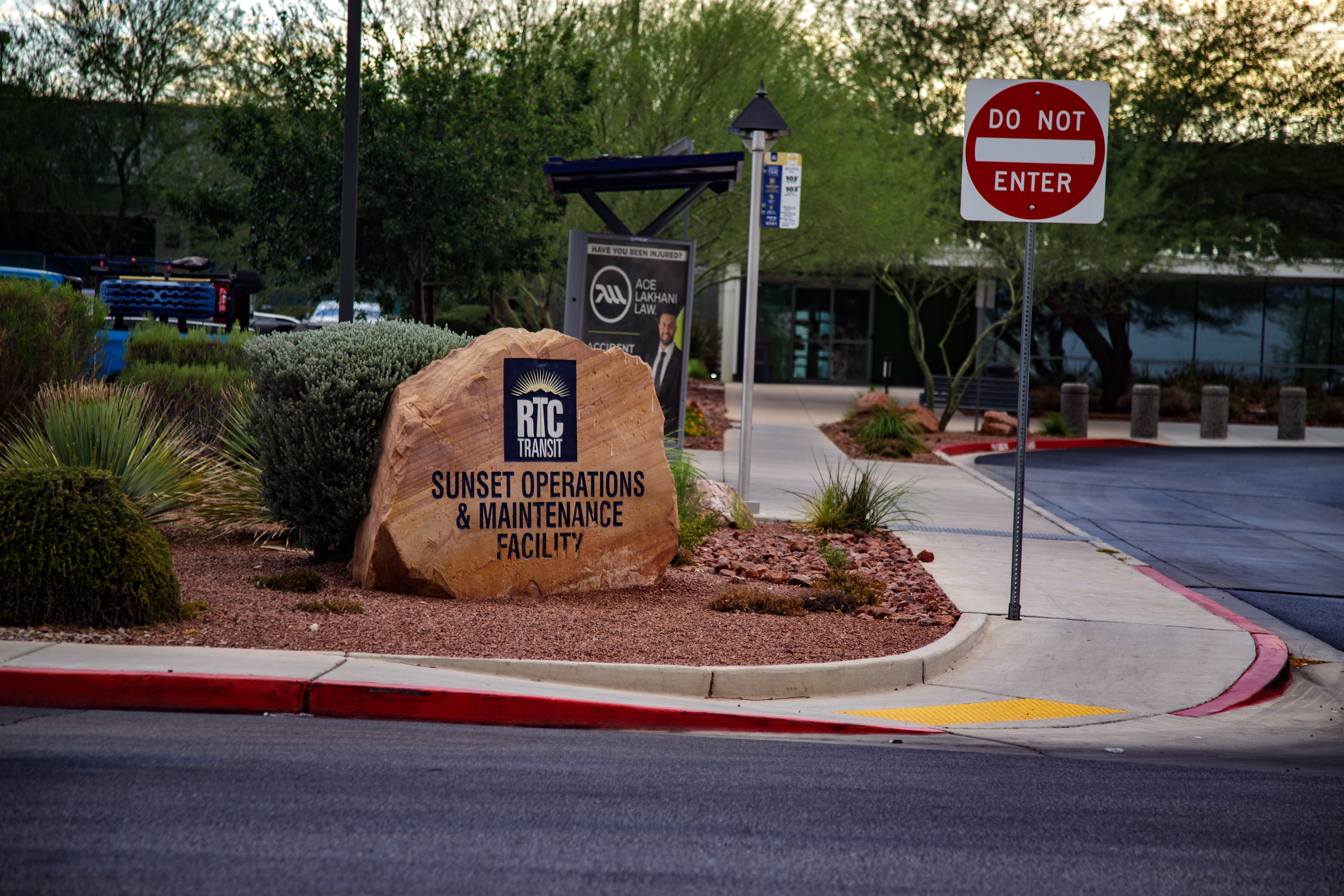
Regional Transportation Commission of Southern Nevada maintenance and training depot.

The Regional Transportation Commission of Southern Nevada operates the RTC Transit system, and does planning for most major roadways.

The Southern Nevada Water Authority is a multi-agency group that manages the water distribution for the Las Vegas Valley.

The Las Vegas Wash Coordination Committee manages and protects the Las Vegas Wash.

Since 1999 the group has added more the 15,000 plants to stabilize the wash's banks and restore and expand the wetlands surrounding the wash. As part of the effort to restore the wash to a more natural state, they have removed more than 500,000 pounds (230,000 kg) of trash.

=== State government ===
Nevada Legislature Office Buidling in Las Vegas

The Nevada Department of Corrections operates three prisons within Clark County. High Desert State Prison, a medium-maximum prison, and the Southern Desert Correctional Center, a medium security prison, are both near Indian Springs, Nevada.

The Florence McClure Women's Correctional Center, originally called Southern Nevada Women's Correctional Facility, opened in North Las Vegas on September 1, 1997. It was built and operated by CoreCivic. On October 1, 2004, the Nevada Department of Corrections took direct control of the facility. It houses the female death row.

The Nevada Legislature and all six offices that comprise Nevada's executive branch have offices in a series of office buildings south of Harry Reid International Airport near Warm Springs Road and Bermuda Road in the unincorporated town of Paradise.

== Education ==
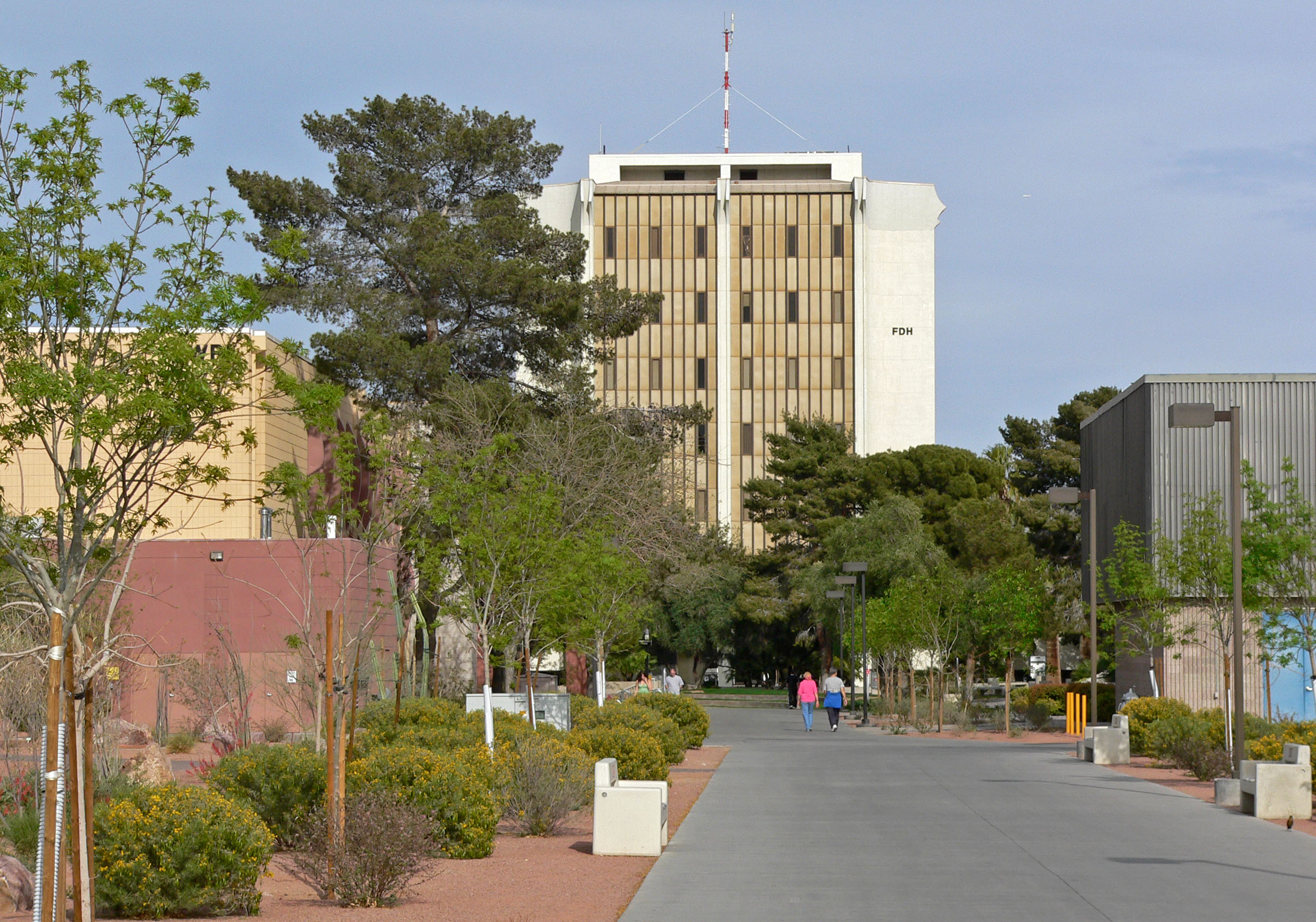
A walkway on the UNLV campus.

The Clark County School District serves all of Clark County, with 228 elementary schools, 59 middle schools, and 54 high schools being the fifth largest in the country. Student enrollment in 2014 was 324,093.

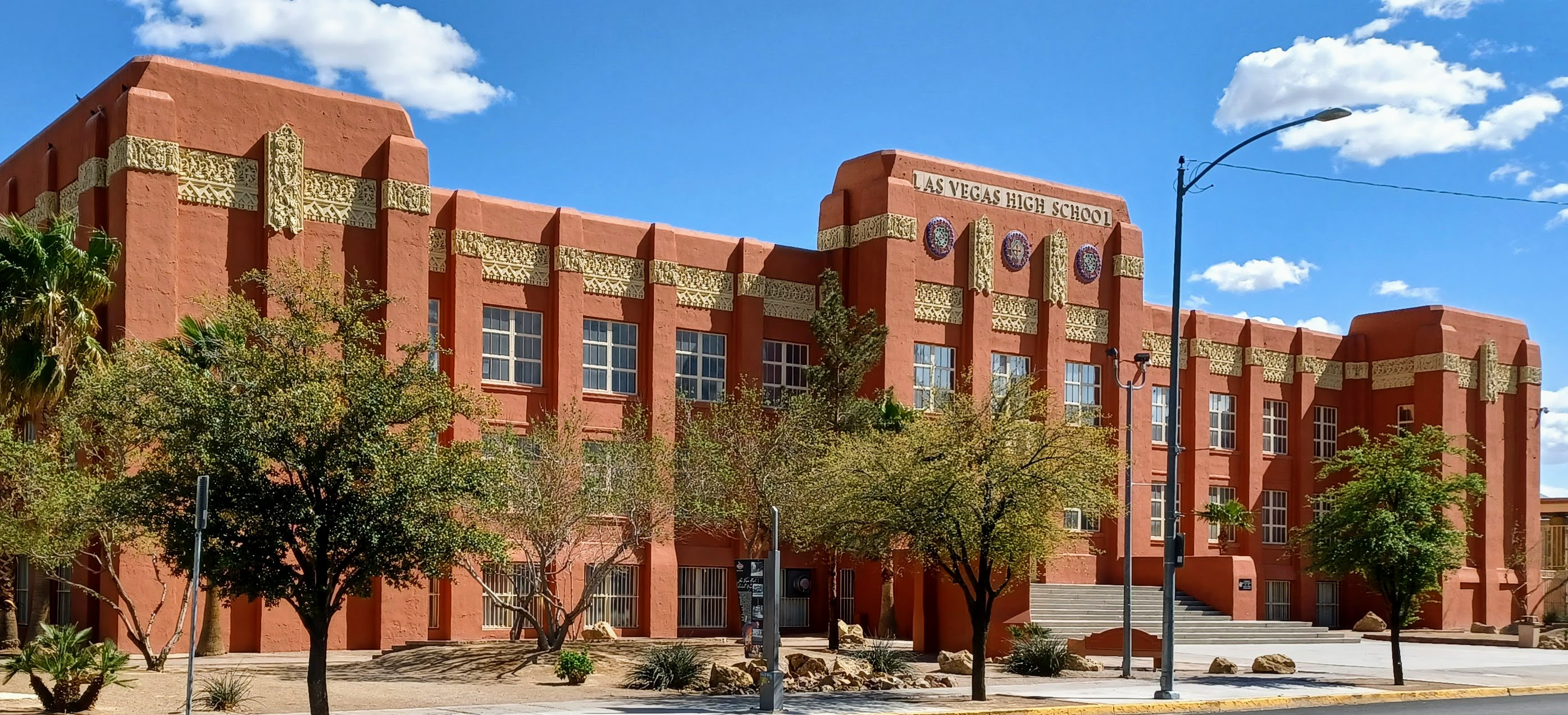
The old Las Vegas High School building, now the location of Las Vegas Academy of Performing Arts.

Colleges serving the area are University of Nevada, Las Vegas (UNLV), College of Southern Nevada, Nevada State University, Roseman University of Health Sciences, and Touro University Nevada.

== Transportation ==
=== Public transit ===
Public transit service throughout Clark County is provided by RTC Transit, which is a subsidiary of the Regional Transportation Commission of Southern Nevada. RTC Transit operates The Deuce Bus rapid transit service between Downtown Las Vegas and the Las Vegas Strip.

=== Major highways ===
- I-11
- I-15 (Las Vegas Freeway)
- I-215
- US 93
- US 95
- SR 146
- SR 147
- SR 156
- SR 157
- SR 158
- SR 159
- SR 160
- SR 161
- SR 163
- SR 164
- SR 165
- SR 168
- SR 169
- SR 170
- SR 171
- SR 172
- SR 173
- SR 562
- SR 564
- SR 573
- SR 574
- SR 578
- SR 579
- SR 582
- SR 592
- SR 593
- SR 595
- SR 596
- SR 599
- SR 602
- SR 604
- SR 610
- SR 612
- SR 613

=== Rail ===
- Las Vegas Monorail

Clark County previously had Amtrak service on the Desert Wind, which served Las Vegas station until it stopped service in 1997. Las Vegas and Laughlin are still served by Amtrak Thruway service which connects to the Southwest Chief.

==== Resort trams ====
- Aria Express
- Mandalay Bay Tram
- Hard Rock-Treasure Island Tram

== Communities ==

Bracketed number refers to location on map, right

=== Cities ===
- Boulder City (21)
- Henderson (19)
- Las Vegas (10) (county seat)
- Mesquite (4)
- North Las Vegas (9)

=== Census-designated places ===
- Blue Diamond (18)
- Bunkerville (5)
- Cal-Nev-Ari (23)
- Enterprise (17)
- Goodsprings (20)
- Indian Springs (6)
- Laughlin (24)
- Moapa Town (1)
- Moapa Valley (3)
- Mount Charleston (7)
- Nelson
- Paradise (15)
- Sandy Valley (16)
- Searchlight (22)
- Spring Valley (13)
- Summerlin South (12)
- Sunrise Manor (11)
- Whitney (formerly East Las Vegas) (26)
- Winchester (14)

=== Air Force bases ===
- Creech Air Force Base
- Nellis Air Force Base

=== Unincorporated communities ===
- Arden (former CDP)
- Cactus Springs
- Cottonwood Cove
- Coyote Springs (planned)
- Crescent
- Crystal (former CDP)
- Fort Mojave Indian Reservation (former CDP) (25)
- Glendale (former CDP)
- Jean
- Logandale
- Las Vegas Indian Colony (8)
- Moapa River Indian Reservation (2)
- Mountain Springs
- Overton
- Primm
- Roach
- Sloan
- Summerlin
- Sutor
- Vegas Creek (former CDP)

== See also ==
- Clark County Fire Department (Nevada)
- List of airports in Clark County, Nevada
- National Register of Historic Places listings in Clark County, Nevada
