= Beat the House 2 =

- Developer: Cetasoft
- Publisher: Interplay Productions
- Platform: Windows
- Release: October 1997
- Genre: Gambling

Beat the House 2 is a 1997 video developed by Cetasoft and published by Interplay Productions, and the sequel to Beat the House. Beat the House 2 features documentation written by gambling expert Avery Cardoza.

== Gameplay ==
The gameplay consists of the player engaging with a collection of casino gambling simulations, selecting from variations of blackjack, craps, mini‑baccarat, roulette, Sklansky's poker challenge, slot machines, and video poker, with each game emulating its real‑world counterpart and offering instructional elements that teach rules and strategies while providing tools that allow the player to print charts and statistical analyses to track performance by session, week, or month, supported by an included strategy guide intended to help the player refine gambling skills.

== Reception ==
Reception

Review scores
Publication	Score
Computer Gaming World	3.5/5
Hacker	72%
PC Gamer	70%
PC Games	C+
PC PowerPlay	76%
Xtreme PC	76%

PC Gamer found the original Beat the House better than the sequel. Computer Gaming World stated that Beat the House 2 is "authentic".
