= Crescent, Nevada =

Crescent
- Unincorporated community
- Location within Nevada Location within the United States
- Coordinates: 35°29′22″N 115°10′43″W
- Country: United States
- State: Nevada
- County: Clark

Population (2020) (Note: Population of Block 3053 within Census Tract 005703, in which Crescent is located)
  - Total: 12
- Time zone: UTC-8 (Pacific (PST))
  - Summer (DST): UTC-7 (PDT)
- ZIP code: 89046
- Area codes: 702/725
- GNIS feature ID: 854415

Crescent is an unincorporated community in Clark County, Nevada, United States located along Nevada State Route 164. Originally founded as a mining town in the early 20th century, it remains a small isolated community with a population of 12 as of the 2020 United States Census.

== History ==
=== Turquoise mining and early gold mining ===
Mining at the site currently known as Crescent dates back to turquoise mining done by prehistoric tribes, possibly the Aztecs or Toltecs, approximately 200 years before the first European settlers in America. The area is thought to have also been settled for gold mining by Mexican miners around the year 1863, who established a camp at the site. Approximately $500,000 worth of gold was extracted from the site from then up until 1878 when the camp was pillaged by a group of Mormon settlers, killing most of the mine's workers.

The rediscovery of the turquoise mines in what would become Crescent is reported to have been made by prospector George Simmons, who first found the deposits in 1889 or 1890 while searching for copper and returned to the area two years later to begin mining upon realizing that he had found turquoise, as recorded by Frank R. Morrissey in a 1968 report titled "Turquoise Deposits of Nevada". Another, more-recent report from the Nevada Historical Society, which was published by the Nevada State Journal in 1976, suggests that a Native American man nicknamed "Prospector Johnnie" rediscovered these mines in 1894 whilst removing a calf that was trapped in a crevice, and began operating a turquoise mine himself. Reported in either source, the mine would be sold to the American Turquoise Company in 1896, who planned to monopolize the turquoise industry in the United States by purchasing nearly every turquoise mine in the country. The mine would eventually be known as the Toltec Mine and would be operated by the American Turquoise Company for the next few decades, supplying American jewelry company Tiffany & Co. with the mineral. Production numbers from the mine remain unknown due to the American Turquoise Company's desire for secrecy, however some significant discoveries at the mine—such as a 320 carat turquoise stone found in 1903—would be reported by local news outlets. In the mid-1920s, the American Turquoise Company completely ceased operations at the Toltec Mine due to rising labor costs.

=== 1905 mining boom and the formation of the Crescent townsite ===
Coinciding with the turquoise mining, more gold, as well as silver, was discovered at the site in 1904, and about 300 claims were staked over the next six months. The next year, in 1905, the Crescent Mining District was established and the mining community of Crescent was founded. The townsite had multiple businesses, a school, its own news publication, and a post office. Shortly after, mining activity began to dwindle, and the post office eventually closed in 1908.

In the 1930s, regular mining activity at the Nippeno Mine in Crescent had recommenced and a new mill was constructed, but operations were short-lived at the site and mining activity at Crescent fell into dormancy again.

=== Present day ===
Currently, Crescent stands as a small community of a few residences without any commercial businesses or public amenities. Minimal mining activity immediate area is ongoing at mines such as the Lucky Dutchman Mine, one of the original 1905 mines.

== Geography ==
Crescent is located at the junction Nevada State Route 164, also known as the Joshua Tree Highway, and Crescent Peak Road. The community is fully surrounded by the Avi Kwa Ame National Monument and lies about 2 mi (3.2 km) east of the California border and 16 mi (26 km) west of Searchlight by road.

Crescent is located within ZIP code 89046, addressed to Searchlight.

== In popular culture ==
An area loosely based on the location and abandoned mines of Crescent appears in 2010 action role-playing video game Fallout: New Vegas.
