= Beat the House (video game) =

- Developer: Spirit of Discovery
- Publishers: Bridge Publications; MacPlay
- Platforms: DOS; Windows; Macintosh
- Release: 1992
- Genre: Gambling

Beat the House is a 1992 video developed by Spirit of Discovery and published by Bridge Publications. It was distributed by Konami. A Macintosh version of Beat the House was released in 1994 by MacPlay. In 1997, a sequel was released, Beat the House 2.

== Gameplay ==
The player engages with a collection of casino games designed to teach the rules, strategies, and betting methods for activities such as blackjack, video poker, roulette, and poker, moving between them to practice and absorb the instructional material presented within each game.

== Reception ==
Reception

Review scores
Publication	Score
All Game Guide	2/5
Electronic Entertainment	3/5
PC Joker	43%
PC Games	C

All Game Guide called Beat the House too specialized and too buggy for most players to achieve enjoyment. Game Players liked the graphics and interface in Beat the House.

In 1994, PC Gamer named Beat the House the 40th best computer game ever. The editors praised the tutorials and wrote that it is "the best of the many casino sims out there."
