= Avery Cardoza =

American author, poker player, and publisher

- Occupations: Author, gambler, publisher
- Known for: Owner of Gambler's Book Shop / GBC Press
- Website: cardozapublishing.com

Avery Cardoza is an American author, professional gambler, and publisher. Cardoza is the owner of the Las Vegas-based Gambler's Book Shop / GBC Press.
