= Clark County Government Center =

Government building in Nevada

Coordinates: 36°9′55″N 115°9′13″W

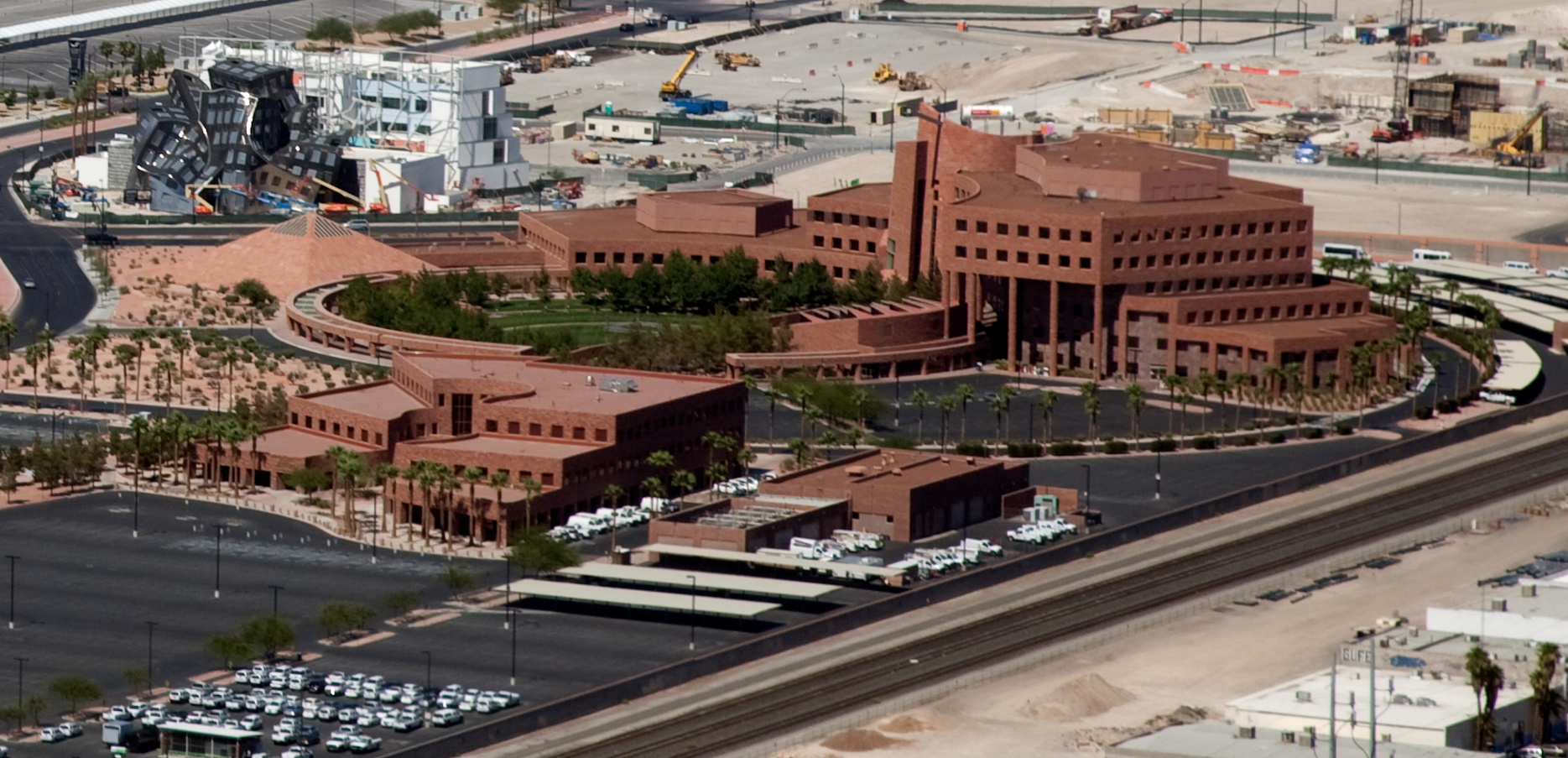
The Clark County Government Center. The Lou Ruvo Center for Brain Health is in the background.

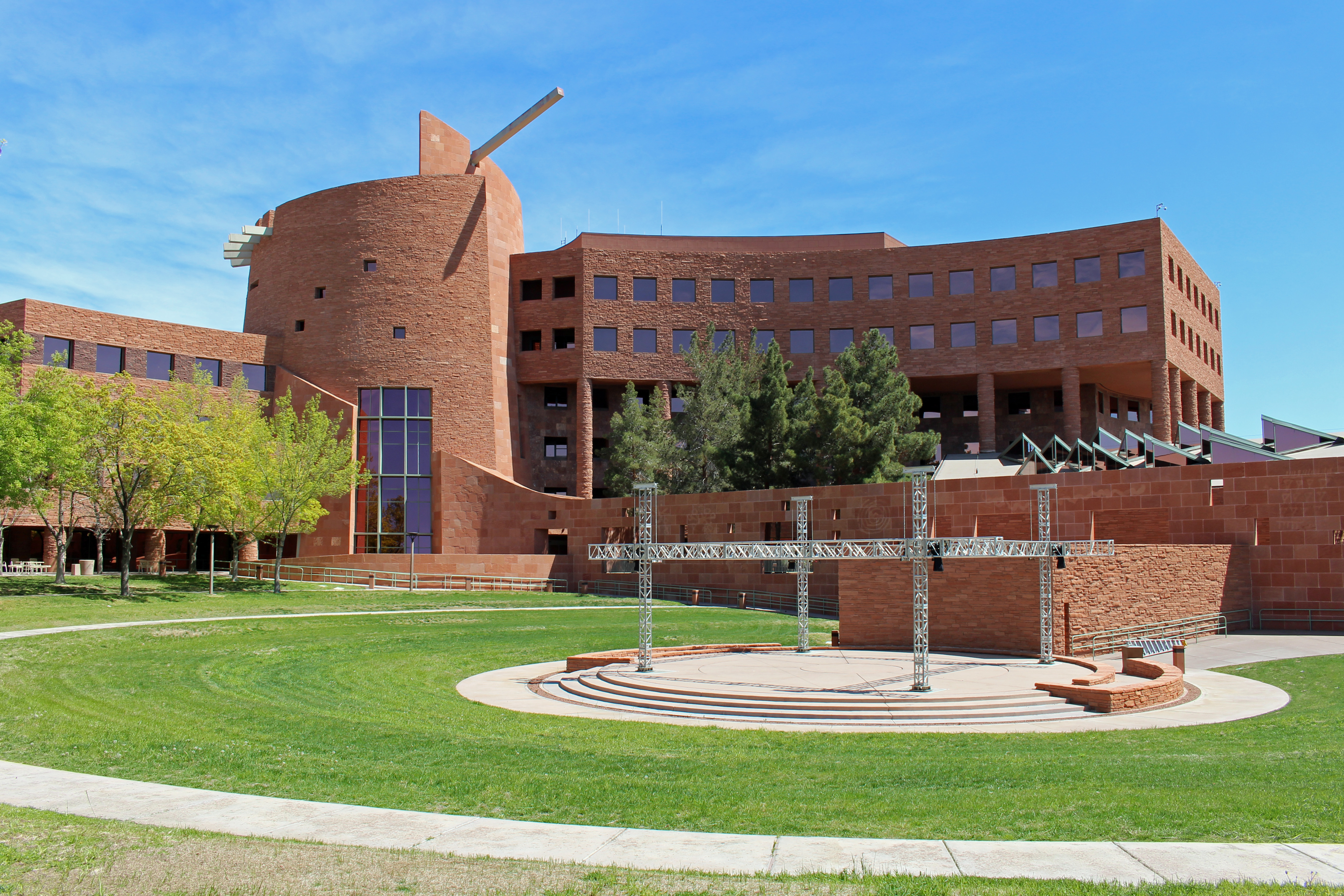
The public amphitheater at the Clark County Government Center

The Clark County Government Center is the seat of government of Clark County in the U.S. state of Nevada and is located in downtown Las Vegas. The center holds the chambers and offices of the Clark County Commission, its appointed county executive, and most county services are headquartered, including the county clerk, recorder, assessor, and others.

The 350,000-square-foot (33,000 m^{2}) complex was designed by Fentress Bradburn and opened in 1995. It consists of a six-story county administration building, three one-story buildings for the county commissioners’ chambers, a multipurpose community facility and a central plant. The building also includes space for government administration, a law enforcement complex, a performing arts complex, a child-care facility and structured parking. It also contains a single-story auditorium, a pyramid-shaped cafeteria and a cylindrical, six-story reception hall, as well as office buildings.

The government center is organized around a courtyard and shaded pedestrian walkway. The shaded, circular arcade supplements the circular form of the buildings. Aligned radially with the columns are three rows of trees framing a sloped lawn amphitheater. A centered raised platform creates the stage. The amphitheater is an acre and a half in area and 280 feet (85 m) in diameter. It has accommodated public gatherings and performances.

== History ==
The site where the center was built had previously been used by the Union Pacific railroad as a maintenance hub. An open trench had been dug by the railroad for disposal of toxic chemicals and was used for over a decade. The practice ceased by the 1970s, and the trench was covered with dirt. Further contamination of the site occurred in the 1980s, from two diesel oil spills.

In the 1990s, the site of the trench area was purchased by Las Vegas for $4 million, and then sold to Clark County for $10 to facilitate the construction of a government center building, as the county's offices were scattered around the area.

In January 2021, a lawsuit was filed alleging that the toxic material from the railroad had not been properly cleaned when the center was constructed, and further alleged that this resulted in a cluster of cancer illness and deaths. Workers involved with the lawsuit claimed that black soot, particularly in the basement level, was prevalent, and that they experienced illnesses while working.

== Awards ==
The center has received awards including “Best Non-Hotel Architecture” and the “People’s Choice Las Vegas Journal” award in 1998, 1999, 2000, 2001, 2002, 2003, 2004 and 2005.
