= Clark County School District Police Department =

The Clark County School District Police Department (CCSDPD) is responsible for policing on or about all of the district properties.

CCSDPD Officers are certified by Nevada's Peace Officer Standards and Training (POST) as Category I sworn peace officers, defined by NRS 289.460, whose authority is statutorily restricted to school district incidents, facilities and functions and have the authority to make arrests, issue criminal citations and traffic citations on streets adjacent to district property.

CCSDPD has a workforce of 40 civilian employees and 180 sworn officers. The command and executive staff consist of 22 sergeants, 6 lieutenants, 4 captains, and a chief of police.

CCSDPD is divided into 3 police Area Commands with police officers assigned to every high school and patrol officers assigned to patrol each command area, primed to respond to the needs of all District elementary, middle, and high schools.

In addition, CCSDPD police officers patrol 24/7 on three different shifts (Days/Swings/Graves) covering all property and buildings belonging to CCSD.

There is a Detective Bureau, Training Bureau, Traffic Bureau, and Communications Bureau consisting of a Fingerprint Unit, Records Unit, and Dispatch Center, totaling about 21 civilian employees.

CCSDPD has a Motorcycle Traffic Unit with four Officers and one Sergeant assigned, who respond to district vehicle crashes and traffic concerns.

CCSDPD also has a K-9 Unit with 6 Officers and one Sergeant assigned.

The head of the department is the Chief of School Police, and is currently held by Henry Blackeye since February 2022.

The schools patrolled are located across Clark County, Nevada, which is the fifth-largest school district in the nation, covering 7,910 square miles and includes the metropolitan Las Vegas area, all outlying communities, and rural areas. CCSD has more than 309,000 students located at 352 schools, with over 30,000 employees consisting of administration, teachers, and support staff.

== History ==
The department was originally formed in 1967 as school security and it was not until 1971 that the state legislature granted the officers in the department status as police officers.

On July 7, 2007, Nevada Revised Statutes expanded the patrol areas for school police to include traffic duty on streets adjacent to school property.

The motto of the Clark County School District Police Department is "Prevention Before Apprehension," which can be seen painted on the rears of their vehicles.

== Communications Dispatch ==
The Communications Dispatch Center of the Clark County School District Police Department is at its Police Station and is not being provided by the City of Las Vegas Combined Communications Center.

== CCSDPD Area Commands ==
- North - Region 1
- West - Region 2
- East - Region 3

== Rank structure ==
Title	Insignia
Chief	
Captain	
Lieutenant	
Sergeant	
Officer	
