= Gambler's Book Shop =

American bookstore and publisher

Coordinates: 36.0903°N 115.1192°W

Gambler's Book Club / GBC Press
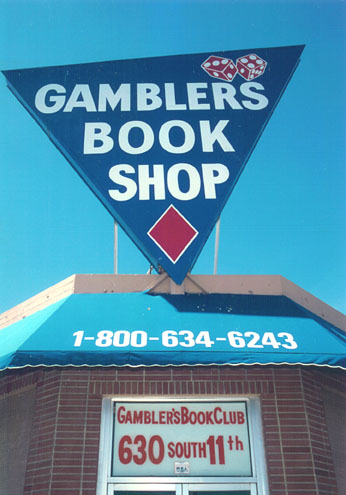
- Gambler's Book Shop sign on S. 11th Street
- Founded: 1964
- Founders: John & Edna Luckman
- Headquarters: Las Vegas, Nevada, U.S.
- Products: Books

Gambler's Book Club / GBC Press is a bookstore & small press dedicated to gambling. Now located at 5473 S Eastern Ave in Paradise, Nevada, it was originally located in the Huntridge area of Las Vegas. The company has operated for over 40 years. Along with original books on various forms of gambling, the company engaged in the reprinting of "classic" works related to gambling that had long passed out of copyright, furthering Founder John & Edna Luckman's vision of Gambler's Book Club as a place of learning for gamblers.

== History ==
The shop began as Gambler's Book Club in 1964, with Luckman envisioning "not just a bookstore, but a library of gambling and a forum for gamblers to gather and visit, argue, gossip, lie, and - most of all - learn from each other". After 45 years the shop moved from South 11th to 1550 Tropicana which instantly expanded their retail space and improved their location with better parking and access just two miles (3.2 km) miles from the Strip.

Among the works kept in print by the bookshop:

- "Stud Poker Blue Book", originally published in 1934
- "Racing Maxims of Pittsburgh Phil", based on the only interview of the famous horseplayer, George E. Smith
- The 1928 "Handbook on Percentages", republished in 1976 by GBC with the "...firm belief...that the library of any gamblephile[sic] is incomplete without this classic work."
- The 1906 "Stealing Machine" by Eugene Villiod, the French detective

Among other notable works published: the first book on the now popular poker variant Texas hold'em, Hold'em Poker by David Sklansky. Although the role of publishing in the company sharply declined with the passing of John Luckman in 1987, printing and other services are still offered to authors leading to a roster of book titles available exclusively through the store.

The company registered Gambler's Book Shop as an alternate name in 1988 to clarify that this was a brick and mortar which did not require a membership card, and to underscore its retail business.

The company produced two quarterly magazines, Casino and Sports and Systems and Methods. Luckman hired Howard B. Schwartz in 1979 as editor of these publications. Howard Schwartz, who was born in Brooklyn and earned degrees from the University of Montana, Kansas State and the University of Northern Colorado, has an education and newspaper background, he became the owner of the store after the death of Edna Luckman (co-founder, and wife of John Luckman). The bookstore, now led by Schwartz, continues to be honored by designations and awards.

The store has been selling online for 11 years, and frequently updates its web site with new products. The store also has a podcast.

== Notes ==
=== Magazine Articles ===
In addition to appearances in and references by newspapers Gambler's Book Shop has been the subject of numerous magazine articles. In one high-profile instance in the August 1967 issue of Playboy Magazine, Maurice Zolotow wrote a 2/3-page piece titled High Rollers, for which he interviewed and referenced (then marketing director) Howard Schwartz regarding the lifestyle of serious gamblers. Schwartz lightly joked about the number "commas" in the bankroll, or gambling budget, of a high roller. Other notable articles:

- GQ, August 1992
- Entrepreneur Magazine, February 1984
- Nevada Magazine, November/December 1996
- Sport magazine, March 1987
- Publishers Weekly May 11, 1990
- Book Magazine, July/August 2001
- Nation's Business, November 1991
