= Myrna Williams (politician) =

American politician (1929–2021)

Clark County (Nevada) Commissioner from district "E"
- In office January 2, 1995 – January 1, 2007
- Preceded by: Thalia M. Dondero
- Succeeded by: Chris Giunchigliani

Member of the Nevada Assembly from the 10th district
- In office 1985–1995
- Preceded by: John Viergiels
- Succeeded by: David Goldwater

Personal details
- Born: Myrna Torme; August 26, 1929 Chicago, Illinois, U.S.
- Died: December 27, 2021 (aged 92) Henderson, Nevada, U.S.
- Party: Democratic
- Occupation: Politician

Myrna Arlene Williams (née Tormé; August 26, 1929 – December 27, 2021) was an American politician. Her career extended from 1985 to 2007 and included ten years in the Nevada Assembly, as well as twelve years in the local government of Clark County, which encompasses the city of Las Vegas. She was a member of the Democratic Party.

== Early years ==
Myrna Tormé was born in Chicago, Illinois, on August 26, 1929, the second and youngest child of William David Tormé (born Wowe Torma, also spelt Tarme or Tarmo), a Polish Jewish immigrant from Brest (now Belarus), and Sarah "Betty" Tormé (née Sopkin), a New York City native. Her father, William, called "Bill", was a child dancer in Russia who had won dozens of contests and even took lessons from the legendary master of the ballet, Vaslav Nijinsky. Coming to America at the age of eleven, along with his father, mother and two younger brothers, he saw his youngest sibling, sister Faye, who was born in New York, achieve fame as the "Wonder Frisco Dancer" when, almost immediately following the family's move to Chicago in 1917, at the outbreak of World War I, she became a star performer at war bond rallies.

In summer 1923, Bill Tormé met Betty Sopkin at a wedding reception in the Morrison Hotel and they subsequently married in January 1924, with their first child, son Melvin, arriving in September 1925. In his autobiography, It Wasn't All Velvet, Melvin, who gained stardom as the recording artist, songwriter and personality, Mel Tormé, recounts that the family surname had originally been "Torma", but an Ellis Island immigration official inscribed it as "Torme". Three weeks before his fourth birthday, and two months before the Wall Street crash of 1929, his mother gave birth to his only sister, Myrna, who, according to him, was named after Myrna Loy, a young silent-screen actress still five years away from becoming a major movie star. He describes young Myrna as an especially pretty baby that, at the age of ten months, developed meningitis and required the removal of a mastoid, which left her with lifelong astigmatism.

In 1934, at the age of five, she, along with Melvin, was enrolled in Chicago's Shakespeare Grammar School on the city's South Side and, in 1943, as Melvin, now Mel, was appearing in his first film, Higher and Higher, the family moved to Los Angeles, renting an apartment in the vicinity of the Wilshire Miracle Mile. In 1947, following her 18th birthday, Myrna moved to New York intending to explore a career in the art and/or modeling industry. Six years later, while attending a party, she met musician David Williams and, during a second date, they decided to marry, with the marriage lasting over 50 years, until his death in January 2006. Williams, born in 1925, played the drums and served as a session musician for a number of top acts, including Frank Sinatra and Sammy Davis Jr. during the Rat Pack's performances in Las Vegas.

== Five decades in Las Vegas ==
Although originally intending to return to live in Southern California, Myrna Williams, whose married name made her an even more-specific namesake of Myrna Loy (birth name Myrna Adele Williams), joined her husband in Las Vegas where, in 1959, he was fulfilling a professional engagement. Finding the area to their liking, they decided to settle there permanently with their only child, daughter Indy. She earned degrees in social work and law enforcement and social work from University of Nevada, Las Vegas and entered local and statewide politics, being elected in 1984, at the age of 55, to the Nevada Assembly and representing Clark County District 10 until 1995, including six years as Speaker pro Tempore. In 1994, representing District E, she won election as a Clark County Commissioner, and was re-elected in 1998 and 2002. In her twelve years on the commission, she served on the following committees and boards:

- Southern Nevada Water Authority
- Las Vegas Valley Water District, chair
- Big Bend Water District
- University Medical Center of Southern Nevada
- Clark County Sanitation District
- State of Nevada Nuclear Projects Commission
- Governor's Sentencing Committee
- Southern Nevada Enterprise Community Executive Steering Committee
- Sunrise Manor Town Advisory Board, vice-chair
- Spring Valley Town Advisory Board, vice chair

Two days before the 2006 general election, her opponent and ultimate winner, Chris Giunchigliani, presented political ads which suggested that Myrna Williams was somehow implicated in the corruption probe which became publicly known as Operation G-Sting because she was the only commissioner running for re-election, who served alongside Erin Kenny, Dario Herrera, Mary Kincaid-Chauncey and Lance Malone, the commissioners who were charged and convicted in the case. All four were indicted in 2003 for accepting cash bribes from strip club owner Michael Galardi during the course of Operation G-Sting. Although she was not a target of the investigation and was not implicated in the probe, the suggestion that she must have or should have known that her political colleagues were corrupt, has been cited as one of the chief causes for her electoral loss.

== Personal life and death ==
Williams died on December 27, 2021, at the age of 92, at her residence in Henderson.

Political offices
Preceded by John Viergiels	Nevada Assembly; 10th district 1985–1995	Succeeded by David Goldwater
Preceded by Thalia M. Dondero	Clark County Commission; District E January 2, 1995 – January 1, 2007	Succeeded by Chris Giunchigliani
