= 1999 Las Vegas flood =

Natural disaster in Nevada, United States

- Date: July 8, 1999
- Location: Las Vegas Valley
- Deaths: 2
- Property damage: $20.5 million (public property)

A severe flood occurred throughout the Las Vegas Valley on July 8, 1999, during the local monsoon season. The storm brought three inches of rainfall to the area, which usually sees only four inches annually. The flood resulted in two deaths, and left some motorists stranded. Police and firefighters conducted 163 rescues throughout the Las Vegas Valley. Flood waters damaged 353 homes and caused $20.5 million in public property damage. It was the most destructive flood in Las Vegas history. A flood control network, developed by the Clark County Regional Flood Control District, was 20-percent finished at the time, helping to mitigate the severity of the flood.

Nevada governor Kenny Guinn declared a state of disaster for the area on July 15, 1999. U.S. president Bill Clinton subsequently approved FEMA financial aid to help cover the cost of public property repairs.

== Background ==
Flash flooding in the Las Vegas Valley is common from July through September, during the local monsoon season. Flooding is caused in part by the presence of non-absorbent hard soil, including caliche. Population growth and ongoing development also contribute to flooding, as the abundance of paved surfaces causes increased water runoff. Storms in 1983 and 1984 prompted the formation of the Clark County Regional Flood Control District, which eventually began work on a flood control network.

== Flood overview ==
The 1999 flood occurred after several weather systems merged, with moisture coming from Arizona, northern Mexico and the Gulf of California. The storm began on July 8, shortly before 11:00 a.m., and most of the rainfall occurred over the next 90 minutes. Several weather warnings were issued the previous afternoon, advising residents of potential flash-flooding. The storm began in the western Las Vegas Valley and gradually moved to the center, raining upon flood water which was in the process of making its way downstream. This contributed to the heavy flooding. The storm brought an estimated 28 billion gallons of water.

Rainfall at McCarran International Airport, near the Las Vegas Strip, measured 1.29 inches. However, other parts of the valley received more rain, with up to 3 inches in some areas. The average rainfall for the year is only 4 inches. Flood waters subsided by 4:30 p.m. It was the worst flood since 1984, and it remains the most destructive flood in Las Vegas history. Although initially reported as a 100-year storm, geologists subsequently determined it to be a 15- or 20-year event based on measurements.

At the time, the flood control network was 20-percent finished, with $400 million already spent on the project. Detention basins helped mitigate the severity of the storm. Las Vegas mayor Oscar Goodman said the 1999 flood would have been "a disaster to end all disasters" if not for the existing flood network facilities.

== Damage and effects ==
The storm and flood damaged 353 homes and destroyed 5 others. Many affected homeowners were not insured for flood damage. At the time, only around 12,300 homeowners had flood insurance in the entire state.

The Flamingo Wash travels west to east across the Las Vegas Valley, serving as a major route for flood water. However, the wash was backed up by debris in the eastern Las Vegas Valley. As a result, water flooded onto nearby Boulder Highway, causing extensive road damage. A particularly hard-hit area was the Miracle Mile Mobile Home Park, located along Boulder Highway. Walls in the Flamingo Wash were eroded by the flood waters; several mobile homes fell over the weakened ledge and into the wash, while others suffered water damage. Of 540 trailers in the park, two dozen were declared uninhabitable.

Firefighters, ambulance workers, and 911 operators were overwhelmed by storm-related emergencies. This included motorists who were left stranded after flood waters stalled their vehicles. Police and firefighters carried out 163 rescues, some by helicopter. Several roof collapses also occurred due to the heavy rainfall.

The flood resulted in two deaths, including a 91-year-old woman who died in a three-car accident attributed to the waters; a Mercedes-Benz, driven by poker player Shawn Sheikhan, hydroplaned into the woman's vehicle. The other victim, believed to have been a homeless man, died of drowning and was found in the Flamingo Wash.

Most casinos suffered only minor leaks. The Caesars Palace resort on the Strip saw the worst of the flooding, which forced the day-long closure of a casino pit and the resort's shopping mall, the Forum Shops. Across the street, the parking garage at the Imperial Palace resort saw flood waters rising three feet and was closed for several hours. Both Caesars Palace and the Imperial Palace (now The Linq) are located along the Flamingo Wash, and are frequent sites for flooding. The Resort at Summerlin delayed its opening by several days due to minor flood damage.

Approximately 20 departing flights were delayed at McCarran International Airport, and four incoming flights were diverted to other airports outside of the state. The North Las Vegas Airport closed its radio tower for the day after losing power. Sunrise Hospital & Medical Center lost 95 percent of its phone service after a lightning strike. MountainView Hospital closed its birthing and surgical unit due to leaks.

Some shows on the Strip were canceled due to the flood, as entertainers had difficulty reaching their venues. Roughly half of retailers at the Meadows Mall and Boulevard Mall were closed; many store employees were either unable or unwilling to arrive for work because of the flooding, and some stores closed early, allowing workers to return home safely before the weather worsened.

== Media coverage ==
KNUU, the only radio news station in Las Vegas, suffered a blown circuit at its transmitter site as a result of the storm and was unable to report on the event. However, the flood was widely covered by local television news, as well as national news outlets. In response to headlines about the flood, the Las Vegas Convention and Visitors Authority issued a statement to media outlets in Southern California and Arizona, emphasizing that the Strip remained open for tourism.

== Response and aftermath ==
Nevada governor Kenny Guinn and other elected officials toured flood-damaged areas, including the Miracle Mile Mobile Home Park. The American Red Cross set up shelter for displaced residents.

A day after the flood, the Clark County Commission declared a state of emergency. Guinn declared a state of disaster for Clark County on July 15, 1999. Five days later, U.S. president Bill Clinton approved the use of FEMA financial aid to cover the cost of public property damage, which totaled $20.5 million. Without existing flood facilities in place, damages would have exceeded $100 million. The state already had a $4.7 million emergency fund, though it contained only $1.8 million after most of the funds went to the 1997 Nevada floods. FEMA sent 80 reservists to Las Vegas to manage assistance programs. The agency provided approximately $15 million to cover repairs, while local governments were responsible for funding the remainder. The Small Business Administration approved more than $1 million in disaster aid to cover private property.

Flood waters destroyed sidewalks and washed out roads throughout the Las Vegas Valley, and also forced the closure of several bridges. County workers had nearly 180 repair jobs; some were expected to take a year to carry out. One bridge did not reopen until three years after the flood.

In 2000, the county announced plans to improve the Flamingo Wash near the Miracle Mile Mobile Home Park, easing resident concerns about future flooding. Some residents living near the Duck Creek Wash sued the county, alleging that inadequate maintenance of the wash led to residential flooding in the area. In 2003, the county agreed to pay residents $1.1 million.

In the 10 years following the flood, the regional flood control network was more than doubled in size. The $700 million project increased the number of detention basins, flood channels, and storm drains. As of 2019, the flood district's master plan was 75-percent finished. At the time, it included 100 detention basins and 648 miles of channels, with $1.9 billion spent up to that point.
