= Segerblom =

Segerblom is a surname. Notable people with the surname include:

- Gene Segerblom (1918–2013), American politician
- Tick Segerblom (born 1948), American attorney and politician
