= Eastside Cannery =

Hotel and casino in Nevada, United States

Coordinates: 36.1078°N 115.0563°W

Eastside Cannery Casino and Hotel

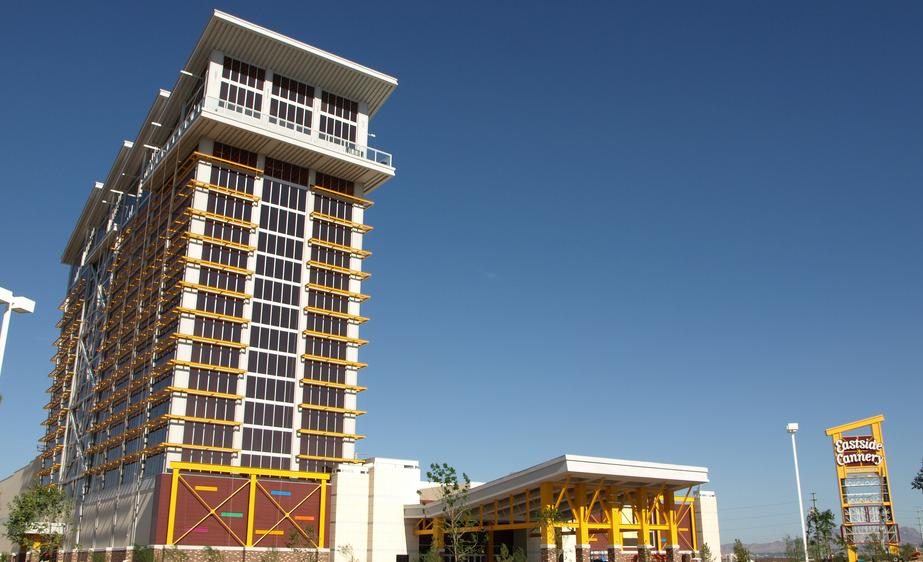
- Interactive map of Eastside Cannery Casino and Hotel
- Location: Sunrise Manor, Nevada; 5255 Boulder Highway
- Opened: August 28, 2008; 17 years ago
- Closed: March 17, 2020; 6 years ago
- Demolished: March 5, 2026; 4 months ago
- No. of rooms: 307
- Gaming space: 63,876 sq ft (5,934.3 m^{2})
- Owner: Boyd Gaming
- Website: eastsidecannery.com

Eastside Cannery Casino and Hotel was a locals casino on the Boulder Strip in Sunrise Manor, Nevada, owned and operated by Boyd Gaming. The Eastside Cannery included a 63,876 sq ft (5,934.3 m^{2}) casino and 307 rooms in a 16-story tower. It was developed by Cannery Casino Resorts at a cost of $250 million. It was a sister property to the original Cannery Casino and Hotel, opened in North Las Vegas in 2003.

Eastside Cannery replaced the Nevada Palace, a small hotel-casino that had occupied a portion of the land since 1979. Construction began on April 30, 2007, and Eastside Cannery opened on August 28, 2008. It was the first hotel-casino to be built on Boulder Highway since Boulder Station, which opened in 1994. Boyd acquired Eastside Cannery in 2016, when it purchased Cannery Casino Resorts. The property closed on March 17, 2020, because of the COVID-19 pandemic in Nevada, but it remained closed as other casinos reopened towards the end of the year. Boyd ultimately announced its plan to demolish the casino in 2025 due to lack of customer demand, and the building was imploded on March 5, 2026.

== History ==
Eastside Cannery was developed by Cannery Casino Resorts. A portion of the land was previously occupied by the Nevada Palace, a small hotel and casino, which opened on July 3, 1979. Bill Wortman, later a co-owner of Cannery Casino Resorts, bought a stake in the Nevada Palace in 1985. The original Cannery Casino and Hotel opened in North Las Vegas in 2003, and plans for an expansion of the brand had already been considered by that time. In 2005, Oaktree Capital Management purchased a 33-percent stake in Cannery Casino Resorts, which announced its intention to build future properties. Oaktree's financial contribution allowed Wortman to buy out his partner in the Nevada Palace.

In September 2006, plans were confirmed for a second Cannery, which would replace the Nevada Palace. A groundbreaking ceremony for the Eastside Cannery took place on April 30, 2007, and included the demolition of 100 rooms at the Nevada Palace. The remaining 100 rooms and the casino would stay operational during much of the construction period, before closing on February 29, 2008. The former Nevada Palace land is now the Eastside Cannery's front parking lot along Boulder Highway.

The Eastside Cannery was designed by Klai Juba Architects, with M.J. Dean as general contractor. It would compete against Sam's Town, Boulder Station, and Arizona Charlie's Boulder. It was the first hotel-casino to be built on Boulder Highway since the completion of Boulder Station in 1994. The Eastside Cannery cost $250 million to develop, a low price compared with other recent locals casinos such as the Red Rock Resort and M Resort. It was built as a slightly higher-end sister property to the original Cannery. The 16-story tower rises 211 feet, and was topped off on December 7, 2007. The tower exterior features an industrial design, consisting of bronze, glass, and steel.

The Eastside Cannery opened on August 28, 2008, amid the Great Recession. The property employed nearly 1,100 people. The workforce included former employees of the Nevada Palace. The Eastside Cannery has 307 rooms, and a 63,876 sq ft (5,934.3 m^{2}) casino. It opened with 2,187 slot machines and 26 table games, as well as a 450-seat bingo hall and a sportsbook. In 2010, a portion of the casino floor was dedicated to coin-operated slot machines, boosting the property's popularity among older gamblers. The Eastside Cannery opened with several restaurants, including a buffet and a steakhouse. The 16th floor included a lounge and restaurant overlooking the Las Vegas Valley. Other features included a pool, a spa, and 20,000 sq ft (1,900 m^{2}) of meeting space.

The property became part of Boyd Gaming in December 2016 through its acquisition of Cannery Casino Resorts. Boyd closed several amenities at the Eastside Cannery, including the bingo hall, the sportsbook, and all but one restaurant. State casinos were ordered to close on March 17, 2020, due to the COVID-19 pandemic in Nevada. Most casinos reopened later that year, although the Eastside Cannery remained closed. Most of its customer base relocated to Sam's Town, also owned by Boyd. Reopening of the Eastside Cannery is contingent on customer demand. In late October 2025, Boyd ultimately confirmed its intention to demolish the Eastside Cannery due to lack of customer demand, planning to sell the site for residential development. The building was demolished via implosion at 2 a.m. Pacific Standard Time on March 5, 2026, notably held without the fanfare that typically accompanied other casino implosions in the area since it was conducted as a private event.
