= Myrna Williams =

Myrna Williams may refer to:

- Myrna Adele Williams (1905–1993), American movie star Myrna Loy's birth name
- Myrna Williams (politician) (1929–2021), American politician
