= Southern Nevada Water Authority =

American government agency

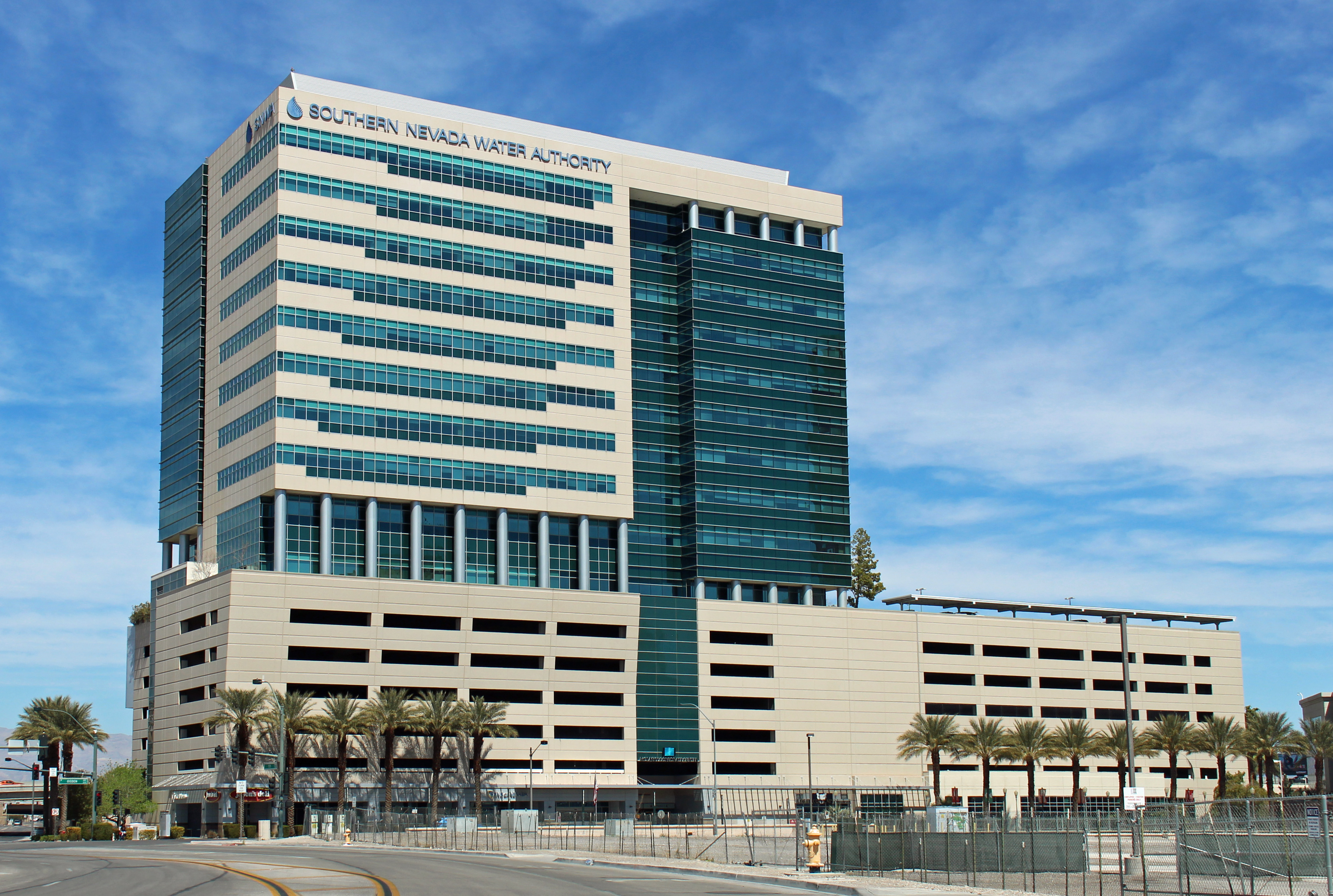
SNWA headquarters in Las Vegas.

The Southern Nevada Water Authority (SNWA) is a government agency that was founded in 1991 to manage Southern Nevada's water needs on a regional basis in Clark County.

SNWA provides wholesale water treatment and delivery for the greater Las Vegas Valley and is responsible for acquiring and managing long-term water resources for Southern Nevada.

From its inception, the SNWA has worked to acquire additional water resources, manage existing and future water resources, construct and operate regional water facilities and promote water conservation.

The SNWA is governed by a seven-member board of directors, which comprises one elected official from each governing board of the SNWA's seven member agencies. While the Board of Directors sets policy direction for the SNWA, the Las Vegas Valley Water District is responsible for the day-to-day management of the organization through an agreement between the SNWA member agencies.

== Member agencies ==
- Big Bend Water District (Laughlin): James B. Gibson (Democratic)
- Boulder City: Steve Walton (Republican)
- Clark County Water Reclamation District: Justin Jones (Democratic)
- Henderson: Dan Stewart (Independent)
- Las Vegas: Olivia Diaz (Democratic)
- Las Vegas Valley Water District: Marilyn Kirkpatrick (Democratic)
- North Las Vegas: Scott Black (Democratic)

== Water supply and distribution ==
Southern Nevada gets nearly 90 percent of its water from the Colorado River. The other 10 percent of the water comes from groundwater that is pumped out through existing wells within Clark County. Perchlorates in ground water in Henderson and associated runoff into the Las Vegas Wash has been a concern since 1997.

=== Treatment facilities ===
- Alfred Merritt Smith Water Treatment Facility
- River Mountains Water Treatment Facility

These facilities first treat the water with ozone to kill any potentially harmful microscopic organisms. As the water leaves the water treatment facilities, chlorine is added to protect it on the way to customers' taps. Since 2000, SNWA has also added fluoride to the municipal water supply.

=== Major distribution systems ===
- East Valley Lateral
- North Valley Lateral
- South Valley Lateral
- West Valley Lateral

=== Reservoirs ===
- Brock Reservoir which is partly funded by SNWA - 8,000 acre⋅ft (2,600×10^{6} US gal; 9,900,000 m^{3})
- Burkholder Reservoir - 50 million US gallons (190,000 m^{3})
- Decatur Reservoir - 20 million US gallons (76,000 m^{3})
- Grand Teton Reservoir - 10 million US gallons (38,000 m^{3})
- Horizon Ridge Reservoir - 20 million US gallons (76,000 m^{3})

=== Major pumping stations ===
- Decatur Pumping Station (81 million US gallons per day (310,000 m^{3}/d) capacity)
- Foothills Pumping Station (140 million US gallons per day (530,000 m^{3}/d) capacity
- Gowan Pumping Station (24 million US gallons per day (91,000 m^{3}/d) capacity)
- Lamb Pumping Station (111 million US gallons per day (420,000 m^{3}/d) capacity)
- River Mountains Pumping Station (315 million US gallons per day (1,190,000 m^{3}/d) capacity)
- Simmons Pumping Station (71 million US gallons per day (270,000 m^{3}/d) capacity)
- Sloan Pumping Station (111 million US gallons per day (420,000 m^{3}/d) capacity)

== See also ==
- Clark County Commission
- Water fluoridation controversy
