= Cliff Segerblom =

American photographer

- Cliff Segerblom c. 1960s
- Born: Clifford C. Segerblom; August 1, 1915; Los Angeles, California, US
- Died: August 8, 1990 (aged 75); Boulder City, Nevada, US
- Occupation: Photography
- Spouse: Gene Segerblom (m. 1941)
- Children: 2, including Tick Segerblom
- Website: cliffsegerblomartwork.com

Cliff Segerblom (August 1, 1915 – August 8, 1990) was an American documentary photographer for the United States Bureau of Reclamation and later a Justice of the Peace and municipal judge in Boulder City, Nevada. Best known for his photographs of Hoover Dam, Segerblom also photographed landscapes and local architecture, creating a visual record of the infrastructural changes throughout Southern Nevada in the 20th century.

== Early life and education ==
Clifford Segerblom was born August 1, 1915 in Los Angeles, California. He studied art at the University of Nevada, Reno in 1934.

== Career ==
=== The Bureau of Reclamation ===
Upon graduating college in 1938, Segerblom accepted a position with the Bureau of Reclamation and became one of two official photographers of the Boulder Canyon Project thus far. Segerblom relocated to Boulder City, Nevada and documented the abilities of the Hoover Dam for the USBR. His photography captured the recreational side of the massive engineering project and was featured in major publications such as Life, Time, National Geographic, and Sports Illustrated.

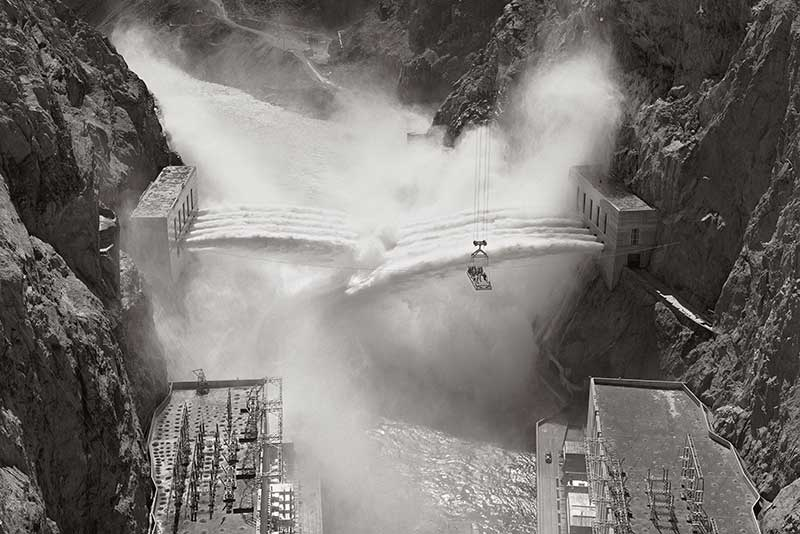
Canyon Wall Outlet Works, September 1940

Segerblom's photo "Canyon Wall Outlet Works" records one of the instances when the Bureau of Reclamation offered trolley rides to certain dignitaries to experience the outlet water of the dam release up close. The photo captures a day when, following heavy rains that raised Lake Mead to record levels, water poured through the jet flow valves on each side of the canyon while tiny spectators dangled precariously close to the streams. In Segerblom’s words: "I understand it was the only time all the outlets were open at once. At one point I was on that skip, which was carrying a number of dignitaries. Interior secretary Ickes was on it, as I recall. I took some photos and then got off and ran around on top of the dam." The September 1940 photograph of the dam is his most circulated work, and was exhibited in New York.

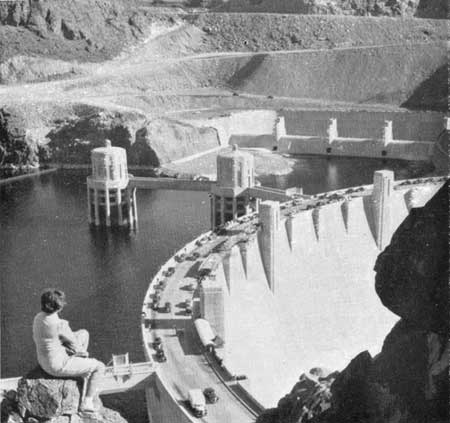
General View, Gene Segerblom Foreground, c. 1940

On the opposite spectrum, another famous photograph of the dam created by Segerblom instead emphasized the calm and recreational potential of Lake Mead. He staged several photographs with his future wife in the foreground, images which suggested that the danger previously associated with the Hoover Dam project had been eliminated. His "general view" image printed in a 1941 edition of Arizona Highways was part of public relations outreach.

He worked as a photographer for the USBR until 1941.

=== Photography ===
Segerblom was hired by the USBR despite having never before taken a photo. He was guided by photographers Ansel Adams and Margaret Bourke-White, and received mentorship from Charles Sheeler.

After World War II, Segerblom continued working as a freelance photographer in Nevada, where he and his wife provided written narratives and visual documentation of Nevada's changing landscapes and culture for local publications. He photographed landscapes, mining towns, ghost towns, and native tribes. Gene wrote several features alongside Cliff’s photography and paintings. Their collaborative work painted a vivid picture of Nevada’s evolving identity.

=== Painting ===
Segerblom was a prolific painter, focusing primarily on Nevada’s natural landscapes and small towns. His work encompassed various mediums, including watercolors, acrylics, oils, and block printing. A notable commission during his career was a series of six watercolors documenting the Apollo 12 splashdown. One drawing, C.O.D. Mail, is housed in the UNLV special collections and the series is part of the U.S. Navy's official art collection.

=== Boulder City community ===
In Boulder City, Segerblom was an active participant in the arts community. He along with Mark Swain and Bill Belknap founded the Belknap Photography Center in 1950 in Boulder City. Segerblom designed the architecture of the building. The shop stayed open until 1965.

He was elected Justice of the Peace for Boulder City in 1965. In 1981 Segerblom appeared in a feature on Boulder City with architectural concepts he'd designed for a museum in Crowe memorial park to house Hoover Dam memorabilia. In 2003, Jon Porter in the United States House of Representatives recognized Segerblom's artistic contributions to Boulder City, calling him "Boulder City's most famous artist".

== Personal life ==
Segerblom married future assemblywoman Gene Segerblom in 1941. Cliff himself later served as a Justice of the Peace and Municipal Judge in Boulder City between 1965 and 1983. They had a daughter, Robin, and a son, Tick.

Segerblom died August 8, 1990, at age 75.

== Collections ==
Segerblom's work is held in the following permanent collections:

- Museum of Modern Art, New York
- United States Navy art collection, Washington, D.C.

== Gallery ==
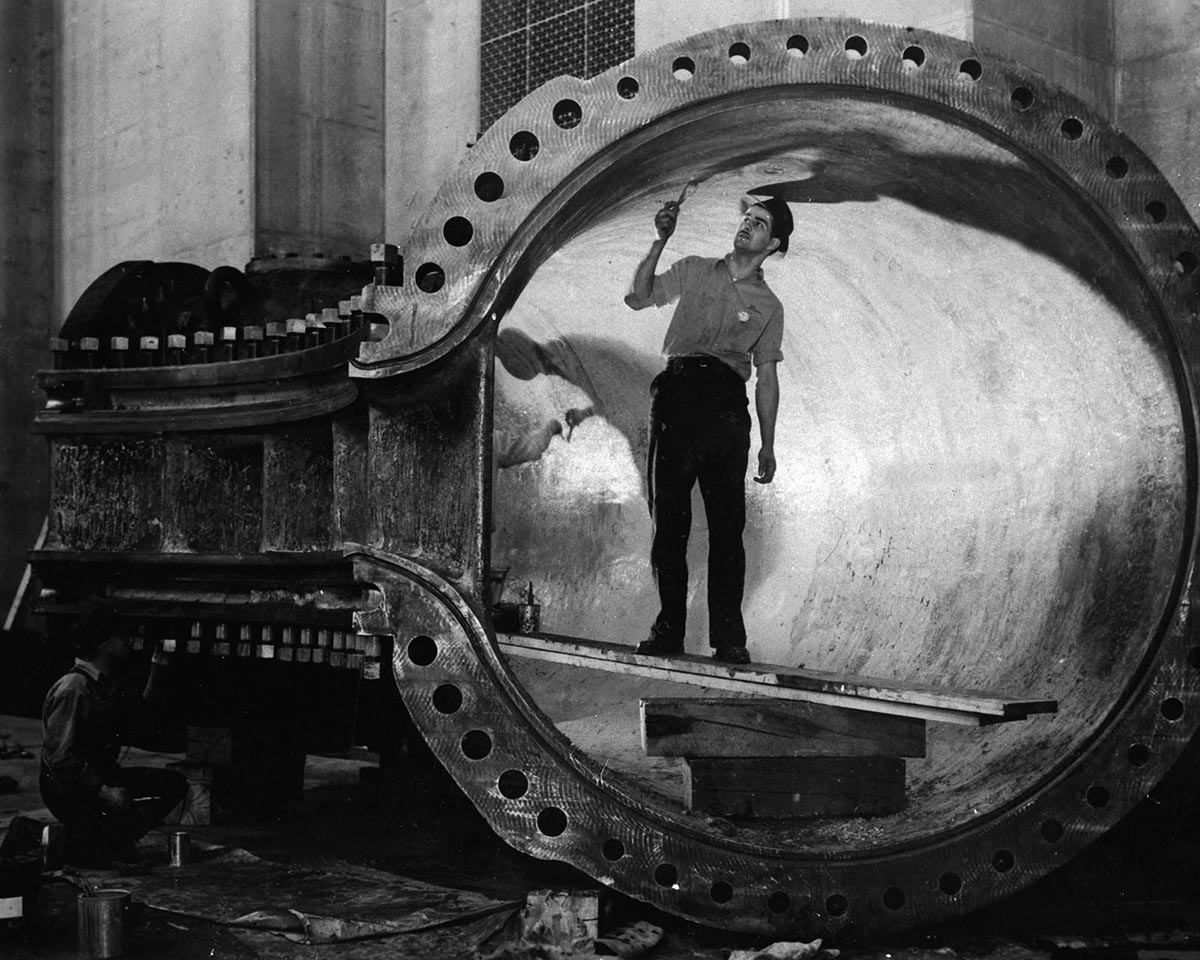
Worker inside a hydraulic turbine runner, c. 1938-1941

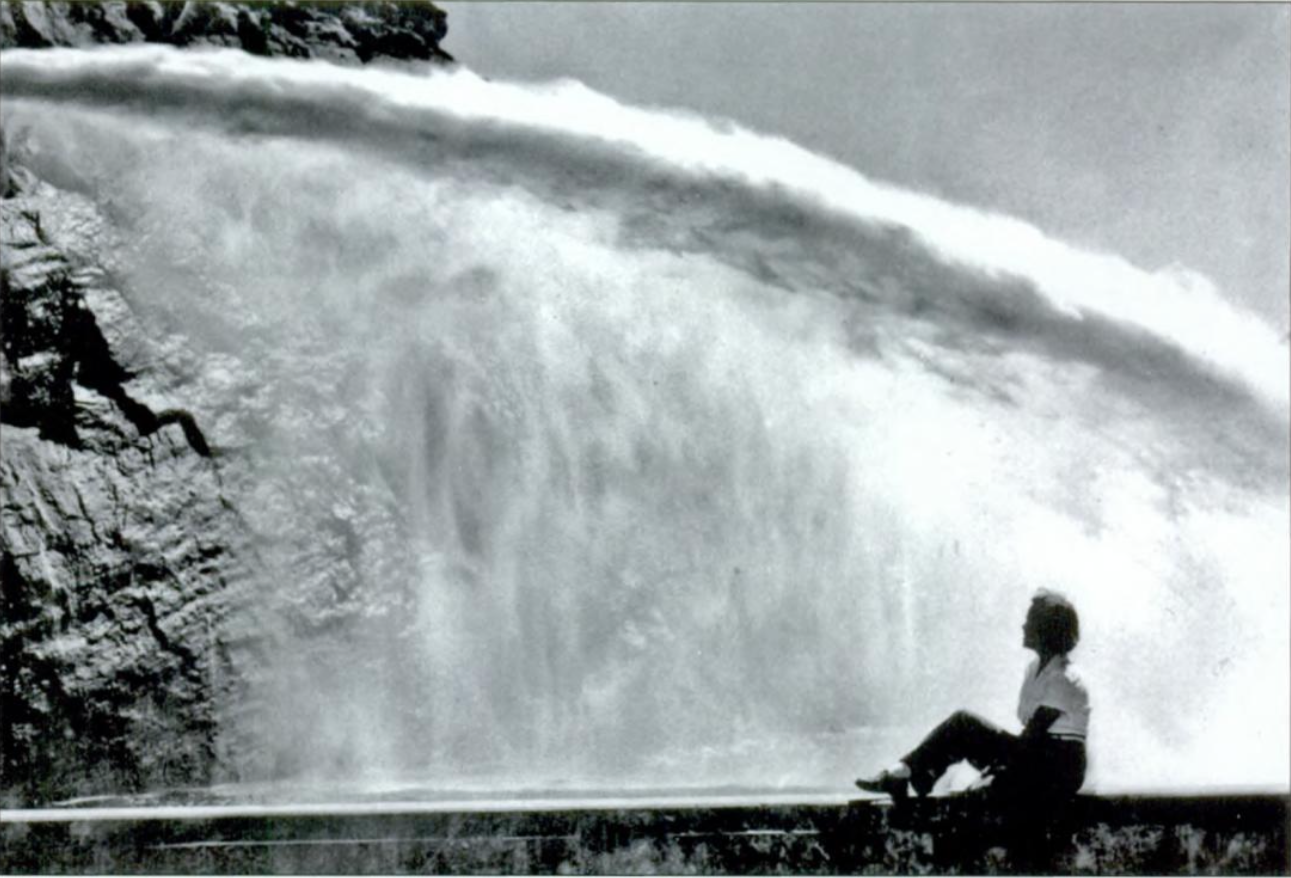
Woman (Gene Segerblom) watching Hoover Dam Needle Test, c. 1938-1941

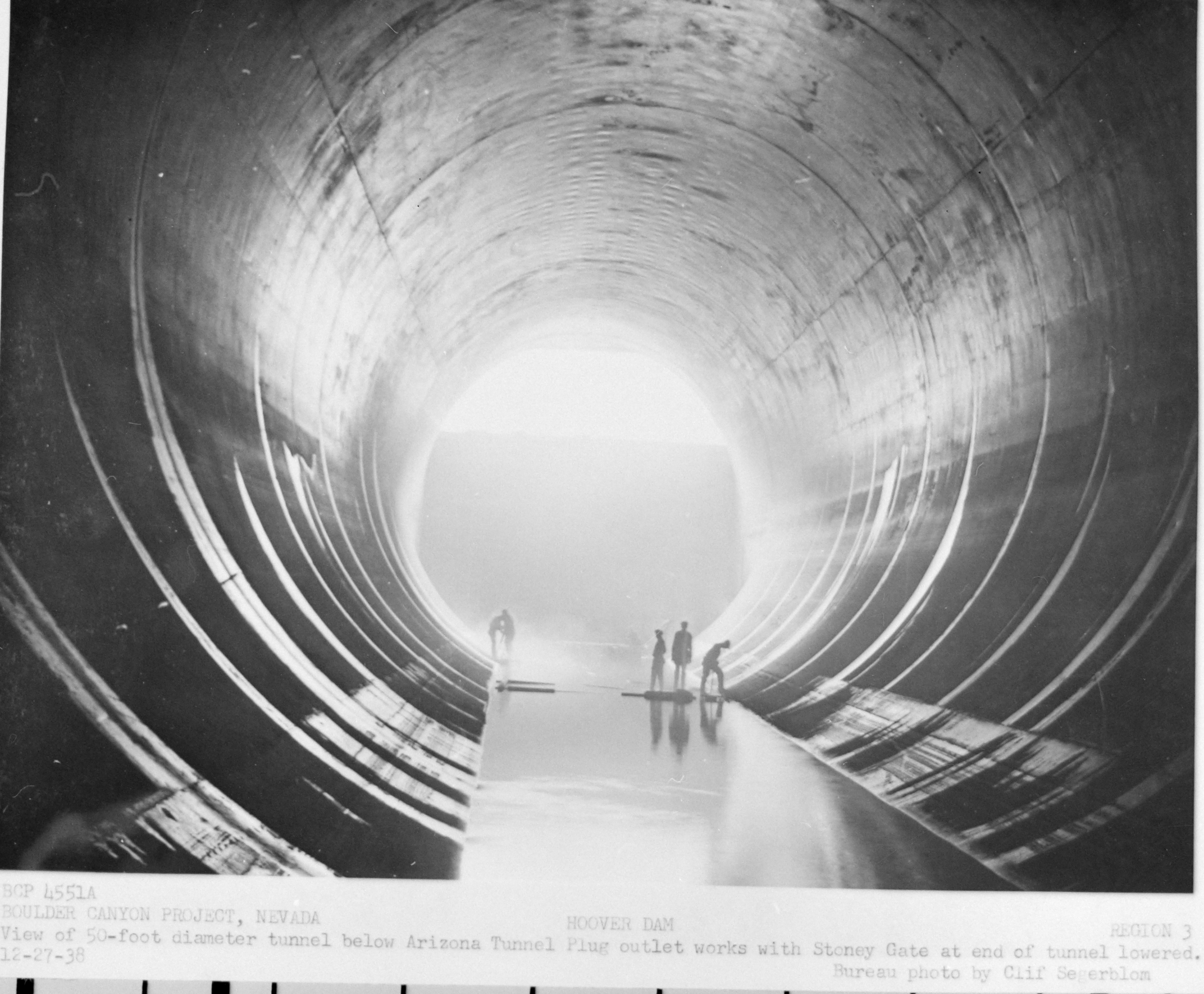
View of 50-foot diameter tunnel below Arizona Tunnel Plug outlet works, December 1938

Mud Deposit, March 1939

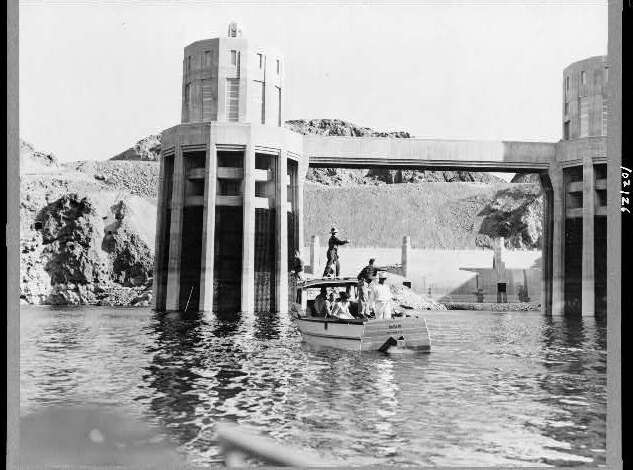
Fisherman trying their luck alongside the Arizona intake towers of Boulder Dam, March 1939

The Uptown Hardware Store in Boulder City, Nevada, August 1939
