= Cannery Casino Resorts =

American casino management company

Cannery Casino
- Founded: 2001
- Founder: William Wortman, William Paulos
- Defunct: December 1, 2016
- Fate: Acquired by Boyd Gaming
- Headquarters: Spring Valley, Nevada, United States
- Key people: William Wortman (founder), William Paulos (founder)

Cannery Casino Resorts was a North American hotel and casino operator based in Spring Valley, Nevada. Established in 2001 as an outgrowth of Millennium Management Group, the company developed and operated casino properties in Nevada and Pennsylvania. It was acquired by Boyd Gaming in 2016.

== History ==
Cannery Casino Resorts was an outgrowth of Millennium Management Group, a casino management company. Millennium was founded in 1996 by gaming executives Bill Paulos and Bill Wortman. Millennium's first venture, in 1997, was to join a consortium competing for a license to develop a casino in Detroit, the proposed Greektown Casino Hotel. The Greektown casino opened in 2000 under Millennium's management.

Cannery Casino Resorts was created in 2001 by Millennium to develop the Cannery Casino and Hotel in North Las Vegas, which opened in 2003 at a cost of $105 million. In 2002, Millennium assumed management of the casino at the JW Marriott Las Vegas under a ten-year lease agreement and rebranded it as the Rampart Casino. Meanwhile, Millennium transitioned to a consulting role at Greektown, as the casino's owners took over management. In 2005, Oaktree Capital Management agreed to buy 33 percent of Cannery Casino Resorts. With the funds injected, Wortman was able to buy out two minority partners in the Nevada Palace casino, which was placed under the Cannery umbrella.

Wortman bought a 20 percent stake in the Rockingham Park racetrack in New Hampshire in 2005, and Cannery obtained an option to buy the park outright. The company led an unsuccessful lobbying effort to legalize casinos in New Hampshire, and proposed a $450 million expansion of the park with up to 5,000 slot machines.

Oaktree funding also enabled CCR to buy The Meadows, a harness racetrack near Pittsburgh, in November 2006 from Magna Entertainment for $200 million. Oaktree's stake in the company increased to 42% as part of the deal. A temporary casino at the racetrack was opened in June 2007, and the permanent facility opened in April 2009.

For seven years, leading into and including Barack Obama's first term in office, CCR helped bankroll the Tejon Indian Tribe's process of regaining tribal status.

In December 2007, Australian gaming company Crown Limited agreed to buy CCR for $1.75 billion. The agreement was ended in March 2009, however, with Crown instead buying a 24.5 percent stake in the company for $370 million, and paying a $50 million termination fee.

Eastside Cannery Casino and Hotel opened on the site of the Nevada Palace in August 2008.

Cannery's lease of the Rampart Casino expired in March 2012, and the casino's owner, Hotspur Resorts, decided to manage the casino itself instead of renewing the agreement.

In May 2014, Cannery agreed to sell The Meadows to Gaming and Leisure Properties for $465 million, with the proceeds going towards reducing company debt.

Boyd Gaming purchased Cannery in December 2016 for $230 million. The Eastside Cannery Casino and Hotel was closed in 2020 and demolished in 2026.

== Casinos ==
- Cannery Casino and Hotel – Opened in 2003.
- Eastside Cannery Casino and Hotel – Opened in 2008.
- The Meadows Racetrack and Casino – Purchased in 2006. Sold in 2016.
- Rampart Casino – Managed from 2002 to 2012.
