= JW Marriott Las Vegas =

Resort casino in Summerlin, Nevada

Coordinates: 36.1758°N 115.2908°W

- Interactive map of the JW Marriott Las Vegas area

General information
- Location: Summerlin, Nevada, 221 North Rampart Boulevard
- Opening: July 15, 1999
- Owner: Hotspur Resorts
- Affiliation: JW Marriott

Technical details
- Floor count: 6

Design and construction
- Architect: Paul Steelman
- Developer: Swiss Casinos
- Main contractor: J.A. Jones Construction

Other information
- Number of rooms: 469
- Number of suites: 79

Website
- marriott.com/hotels/propertypage/lasjw

JW Marriott Las Vegas Resort and Spa is a resort in Summerlin, Nevada, near Las Vegas. The Rampart Casino is located within the hotel. The property is owned and operated by Hotspur Resorts, which franchises the JW Marriott name from Marriott International. The hotel has 548 rooms and the casino measures 57,610 square feet (5,352 m^{2}).

The project was announced in 1996, as The Resort at Summerlin. It was developed by Seven Circle Resorts, and the hotel portion was initially operated under a franchise from Regent International Hotels. The opening was originally scheduled for 1998, but the project saw several delays and cost overruns. It was designed by Paul Steelman and built by J.A. Jones Construction at a final cost of $276 million.

The Resort at Summerlin opened on July 15, 1999, with a casino and a hotel tower known as the Regent Grand Spa. A second tower, the Regent Grand Palm, opened in January 2000. Within a month, the entire property was renamed The Regent Las Vegas. The resort experienced financial trouble and filed for Chapter 11 bankruptcy protection in November 2000. Hotspur purchased the resort a year later and rebranded the hotel under the JW Marriott name. In 2002, the casino portion was renamed as the Rampart Casino by Millennium Management Group, which signed a 10-year lease. Hotspur took over management after the lease expired.

== History ==
=== Development and opening (1996-2000) ===
In May 1996, the Howard Hughes Corporation, developer of the Summerlin planned community, announced an agreement for a casino resort to be developed by Seven Circle Resorts, an American affiliate of Swiss gaming firm Swiss Casinos. The opening was originally planned for 1998. Paul Steelman was the architect for the project, which would be known as The Resort at Summerlin. Developers envisioned it as a luxury golf and spa resort, similar to those found in destinations like Scottsdale, Arizona and Palm Springs, California. The property would have relationships with several nearby golf courses, including exclusive control of half of the tee times at the neighboring Tournament Players Club at the Canyons.

Seven Circle purchased the 54-acre (22 ha) site from Howard Hughes Corp. in August 1996 for $16.6 million. The company faced some opposition from nearby residents after modifying the project plans to include a second hotel tower. The enlargement plans were eventually approved, despite concerns about the impact it would have on the community. By February 1998, construction was underway. The hotel was topped out on December 1, 1998. Managed by J.A. Jones Construction, the project was marked by delays and cost overruns. The final cost of development was $276 million, including $76 million contributed by Swiss Casinos and $200 million borrowed from lenders.

The Resort at Summerlin quietly opened its doors on July 15, 1999. The opening had been delayed by three days because of the 1999 Las Vegas flood, which caused minor water damage to electrical circuits. Its developers described it as Las Vegas' first off-Strip luxury resort. At opening, the property included a 286-room hotel tower, two restaurants, and a casino. The hotel was named the Regent Grand Spa, under a franchise from Regent International Hotels. Because of construction delays, other amenities, including the spa, pool, retail shops, and more restaurants, opened over the following months.

The second hotel tower, the 255-room Regent Grand Palm, opened in January 2000. By the next month, the entire property had been renamed as The Regent Las Vegas, to capitalize on its affiliation with the upscale Regent brand, and the two hotels were known simply as the Spa tower and the Palms tower.

In June 2000, Swiss Casinos announced plans to purchase a 22-acre (8.9 ha) parcel next to the Regent and to develop it with timeshare units and tennis courts, but this project never came to fruition.

=== After completion (2000-present) ===
Signs of financial trouble appeared as early as November 1999, when the resort's operating company revealed that it was seeking new financing and its credit rating was downgraded. By March 2000, the resort was in technical default on its mortgage debt, as a result of having borrowed additional money from Swiss Casinos. Executives began to shift the casino's focus to attract more locals, such as by replacing slot machines with video poker machines.

In September 2000, the Regent defaulted on various payments to creditors. By November, executives were attempting to renegotiate the property's debt, and 239 of the resort's 1,700 employees had been laid off. Several restaurants were closed or saw reduced operations. The Regent filed for Chapter 11 bankruptcy protection later that month, and soon began seeking a buyer for the property. Real estate developer Peccole Nevada was selected as the stalking horse bidder, with an offer of $150 million, but then withdrew its bid after a disagreement with its financing partner. A new bid of $80 million by Los Angeles-based hotel company Maritz, Wolff was then selected, but was also withdrawn after negotiations with the Regent's creditors broke down. Finally, the resort was sold to Hotspur Resorts, the hotel affiliate of Canadian real estate firm Larco Investments, for $80 million. Observers had expected a competitive auction with bids from major casino operators, but most potential buyers lost interest after the September 11 attacks, which occurred two weeks before the auction. Hotspur completed its purchase in November 2001.

Hotspur rebranded the hotel under the JW Marriott name, hoping that it would be a better draw than the Regent name, which was found to have good name recognition in Asia but not in America. The casino was leased in 2002 to Nevada-based Millennium Management Group on a 10-year lease. Millennium renamed the casino as the Rampart Casino at the Resort at Summerlin, and continued the effort to shift the casino's marketing emphasis away from high rollers towards locals. Hotspur also leased out the restaurant and shop space, and Millennium added three new restaurants. Convention space was doubled in 2003 with the opening of a 31,000 sq ft (2,900 m^{2}) expansion, built at a cost of $4.9 million.

When the casino lease expired in 2012, Hotspur opted not to renew the agreement, assuming direct management of the casino, with the help of consulting services from Affinity Gaming. Michael Gaughan, Jr., the son of casino magnate Michael Gaughan, was hired as the property's general manager. Meanwhile, revenues declined because of a slow economy and increased competition from newly opened Strip resorts, leading the property to again default on its mortgage payments. The owners were able to avoid foreclosure, ultimately negotiating a loan modification in December 2013.

Gaughan upgraded the casino to attract more visitors, beginning a renovation in 2012 that lasted several years. The project added 1,200 new slot machines and a new race and sports book layout. A bingo hall was added in 2014, and room renovations were completed the following year, while convention-center remodeling was scheduled to conclude in early 2016. A new sports book was opened in 2017, replacing an Irish bar, and several new restaurants were added over the next year. The Rampart Buffet underwent a four-month renovation and reopened in 2019 as the Market Place Buffet, with outdoor seating added. Additional parking space was also built. A property wide renovation was finished in 2024, at a cost of $75 million.

In December 2025, JW Marriott Las Vegas and Rampart Casino announced they would be uniting the resort and the casino with a property-wide rebrand. As of January 1, 2026, the properties will be returning to the original name, The Resort at Summerlin.

== Facilities ==
The hotel has 469 rooms and 79 suites, with rooms starting at 560 square feet (52 m^{2}). There is a 40,000-square-foot (3,700 m^{2}) spa and 115,900 square feet (10,770 m^{2}) of meeting and event spaces.

The casino has 57,610 square feet (5,352 m^{2}) of gaming space with 1,560 slot machines, 28 table games, and a race and sports book.

The resort included a nightclub and lounge known as Plush, which operated from 2004 to 2006. Its owners then sued Hotspur Resorts, alleging that the latter failed to advertise the club as promised.

== Film history ==
In April 2004, scenes were shot at the casino for the fourth season of CSI: Crime Scene Investigation.
