= Chris Giunchigliani =

American politician

Member of the Clark County Commission from District E
- In office January 1, 2007 – January 1, 2019
- Preceded by: Myrna Williams
- Succeeded by: Tick Segerblom

Member of the Nevada Assembly from the 9th district
- In office 1991 – November 8, 2006
- Preceded by: Eileen Brookman
- Succeeded by: Tick Segerblom

Personal details
- Born: November 27, 1954 (age 71) Lucca, Italy
- Party: Democratic
- Spouse: Gary Gray (m. 1987; died 2015)
- Education: Avila University (BA); University of Nevada, Las Vegas (MEd)

Christina R. Giunchigliani (/dʒʊŋˌkɪliˈɑːnɪ/; born November 27, 1954), commonly known as Chris G., is an American politician of the Democratic Party who served as a Clark County Commissioner from 2007 until 2019. Giunchigliani has been active in Nevada politics since 1991, previously serving in the Nevada Assembly, 1991–2006.

== Biography ==
Giunchigliani was born to American parents in Lucca, Italy. The oldest of six children (three girls and three boys), Giunchigliani grew up in Chicago. She was sexually abused when she was eight years old and her sister was kidnapped and raped for three days.

Giunchigliani attended Avila College in Kansas City, Missouri. She worked in retail, bartended and waitressed to pay her way through college, graduating in 1976 with a bachelor's degree in special education.

After teaching special education in Shawnee Mission, Kansas for two years, she moved to Las Vegas, and worked her way to another degree, this time at the University of Nevada, Las Vegas, earning a master's degree in education with special emphasis on the emotionally disturbed.

Giunchigliani married Nevada political consultant and former union president Gary Gray in 1987. They had no children. On April 9, 2015, Gray died of complications from injuries sustained after a car accident. The accident was caused by drifting across the highway center line, and crashing his red Ford pickup truck head-on at a white Jeep on State Route 157 eastbound. This highway is northwest of Las Vegas, Nevada. Gray was pronounced dead at the University Medical Center of Southern Nevada (UMCSN) in Las Vegas, aged 69. Gray was a longtime political operative in Nevada, called "one of the great political minds in Nevada history" by then-Senate Majority Leader Harry Reid.

== Political career ==
Giunchigliani began her career in union politics in Shawnee Mission, where she worked on communications and negotiations. She immediately got involved in union politics once she became a teacher in Las Vegas, rising until her election as president of the Clark County Education Association from 1983 through 1987 and as president of the Nevada State Education Association from 1987 through 1991. While serving as president, her husband Gary Gray co-founded the Assembly Democratic Caucus and became its first Executive Director.

From 1991 to 2006 she served in the Nevada Assembly, serving eight regular and six special sessions, all but one of which were contested. While serving in the Assembly, Giunchigliani authored and passed legislation implementing mandatory kindergarten in public schools and requiring insurance companies to cover oral contraceptives. She led the fight in the Legislature through multiple sessions to end the use of capital punishment for juvenile defendants, introducing bills to ban the death penalty in juvenile cases three separate times. She opposed the death penalty in subsequent efforts as both a legislator and as a member of statewide coalitions against capital punishment. Giunchigliani was succeeded by Tick Segerblom in the Nevada Assembly.

In 2006, she was elected to the Clark County Commission. She opposed the "More Cops" tax, which sought to increase the sales tax to allow police departments to hire more officers, calling the tax "regressive." In 2017, Giunchigliani was the only Commissioner to vote "no" on the use of public funds to build a stadium for the Oakland Raiders. She advocated for economic development based on investment in "mom and pop" businesses rather than large corporate enterprises, referring to small businesses as the "backbone of our society."

In 2011, she ran for Mayor of Las Vegas and was defeated by Independent candidate Carolyn Goodman, the wife of former Mayor Oscar Goodman. During the campaign, she employed grassroots tactics based on neighborhood canvassing.

In 2019, she founded a non-profit named after her deceased husband called Gray's Leadership Academy dedicated to providing leadership and ethics education for youth, LGBTQ+, people of color, and women interested in civic and campaign skills.

During the 2020 Democratic Party presidential primaries, Giunchigliani endorsed Elizabeth Warren.

== Runs for higher office ==
=== 2018 ===
Giunchigliani was a candidate for the Democratic nomination for Governor of Nevada in 2018, but lost the primary to Steve Sisolak.

Political offices
Preceded by Eileen Brookman	Member of the Nevada Assembly; 9th district 1991–2006	Succeeded by Tick Segerblom
Preceded by Myrna Williams	Clark County Commission; District E January 1, 2007 – present	Succeeded by Incumbent
