= Clark County Water Reclamation District =

Nevada government wastewater treatment agency

The Clark County Water Reclamation District is a government wastewater treatment agency in Clark County, Nevada, United States. As a member of the Southern Nevada Water Authority, its mission is to treat millions of gallons of wastewater that is produced every day. The District is the largest water treatment agency in Southern Nevada and is responsible for treating wastewater from unincorporated parts of Clark County within the Las Vegas Valley, including most of the Las Vegas Strip, and the communities of Blue Diamond, Moapa Valley, Indian Springs, Laughlin, and Searchlight.

The district was created by judicial decree in August 1954. Prior to that time, the treatment of sewage in unincorporated Clark County was by means of cesspools, septic tanks, and several small treatment plants operated by the hotels along the Las Vegas Strip. The continuing growth of both the tourist and residential portions of the community pointed out the need for more sanitary and efficient means of treating the wastewater.

The District collects and reclaims an average of 83 million US gallons (310,000 m^{3}) per day of wastewater. Current plans call for expansion of the district's facility to allow for up to 110 million US gallons (420,000 m^{3}) per day of wastewater to be treated, which will be needed as the Las Vegas Valley continues to grow.

Other wastewater in the Las Vegas Valley is treated by individual cities that operate their own treatment facilities.

== See also ==
- Clark County Regional Flood Control District
- Las Vegas Valley Water District
- Southern Nevada Water Authority
