= Hazel Bell Wines =

American politician

(undated)

Hazel Bell Wines (1885–April 1949) was a US teacher, politician, artist, and organizer for historical preservation in Nevada. Assemblywoman Hazel Bell Wines (Democrat-Humboldt County, 1934–1936), her father, Senator William "Johnny" Bell (Democrat-Humboldt County, 1906–1914), and daughter, Assemblywoman Gene Wines Segerblom (Democrat-Clark County, 1992–2000) were the first grandfather, mother and daughter to all serve as state legislators.

== Biography ==
Born in Paradise Valley, Humboldt County, Nevada on September 27, 1885, Hazel Bell was a daughter of William John Bell, who "made his fortune on the Buckskin Mine, a Winnemucca saloon, and various land investments" prior to serving in the Nevada state senate from 1907 to 1915, according to the Reno Gazette-Journal. Following her completion of high school in California in 1902, she attended, and graduated from, the California State Normal School, and then became a public school teacher.

She married Stanley L. Wines in 1907 in Winnemucca, Nevada; they had five children.

In 1934, she was elected to the Nevada State Senate. Serving one term, she represented the district which included Winnemucca.

Hazel Bell Wines died in San Francisco, California in 1949.
