= William McCurdy II =

American politician and Chair of the Nevada Democratic Party

Vice Chair of the Clark County Commission
- Incumbent
- Assumed office January 2, 2024
- Preceded by: Tick Segerblom

Member of the Clark County Commission from District D
- Incumbent
- Assumed office January 4, 2021
- Preceded by: Lawrence Weekly

Chair of the Nevada Democratic Party
- In office March 4, 2017 – March 6, 2021
- Preceded by: Roberta Lange
- Succeeded by: Judith Whitmer

Member of the Nevada Assembly from the 6th district
- In office November 9, 2016 – November 4, 2020
- Preceded by: Harvey Munford
- Succeeded by: Shondra Summers-Armstrong

Personal details
- Born: William O'Neil McCurdy II; April 16, 1988 (age 38) Las Vegas, Nevada, U.S.
- Party: Democratic
- Education: College of Southern Nevada (AA); University of Nevada Las Vegas

William O'Neil McCurdy II (born April 16, 1988) is an American politician serving as a member of the Clark County Commission from District D. He was previously a member of the Nevada Assembly from 2016 to 2020 and chair of the Nevada Democratic Party from 2017 to 2021.

== Early life and education ==
McCurdy was born in Las Vegas and raised in Vegas Heights. After having a child in high school, McCurdy dropped out and became a construction worker to be able to provide for his family. At the age of 24, McCurdy earned his associate's degree from the College of Southern Nevada, where he later became student body president. McCurdy is taking courses at the University of Nevada, Las Vegas toward a Bachelor of Science in urban studies.

== Career ==
After finding success in leadership in the field of construction, rising to the role of foreman on a large construction job on the Las Vegas Strip.

McCurdy was elected to the Nevada Assembly in 2016, prevailing in a four-way Democratic primary and defeating Republican general election opponent Carlo Maffatt in a landslide. McCurdy announced his bid for the Clark County Commission in August 2019.

McCurdy was elected chair of the Nevada Democratic Party on March 4, 2017. He was the party's first black chair and its youngest, at the age of 28, when elected.

He currently serves on the board of advisors of Let America Vote, an organization founded by former Missouri Secretary of State Jason Kander that aims to end voter suppression. McCurdy was a political director of the Service Employees International Union.

== Personal life ==
McCurdy has two children.

== Political positions ==
McCurdy supports raising the minimum wage to $15 an hour.

== Electoral history ==
Nevada Assembly District 6 Democratic primary, 2016
Party	Candidate	Votes	%
Democratic	William McCurdy II	1,728	62.11
Democratic	Macon Jackson	487	17.51
Democratic	Valencia Burch	411	14.77
Democratic	Arrick "Kerm" Foster	156	5.61
Total votes		2,782	100.00

Nevada Assembly District 6 election, 2016
Party	Candidate	Votes	%
Democratic	William McCurdy II	12,227	87.23
Republican	Carlo Maffatt	1,790	12.77
Total votes		14,017	100.00

Party political offices
Preceded by Roberta Lange	Chair of the Nevada Democratic Party; 2017–2021	Succeeded by Judith Whitmer
Political offices
Preceded by Tick Segerblom	Vice Chair of the Clark County Commission; 2024–present	Incumbent
Preceded by Lawrence Weekly	Member of the Clark County Commission from District D 2021–present	Incumbent
