= Daniele Monroe-Moreno =

American politician (born 1964)

Mayor-elect of North Las Vegas
- Assuming office November 30, 2026
- Succeeding: Pamela Goynes-Brown

Chair of the Nevada Democratic Party
- Incumbent
- Assumed office March 4, 2023
- Preceded by: Judith Whitmer

Speaker pro tempore of the Nevada Assembly
- Incumbent
- Assumed office February 6, 2023
- Preceded by: Steven Yeager

Member of the Nevada Assembly from the 1st district
- Incumbent
- Assumed office November 9, 2016
- Preceded by: Stephanie Smith

Personal details
- Born: 1964 (age 61–62) Tucson, Arizona, U.S.
- Party: Democratic

Daniele Monroe-Moreno (born 1964) is an American politician and former corrections officer serving as a Democratic member of the Nevada Assembly since 2016. She represents the 1st district, which covers parts of North Las Vegas.

== Biography ==
Monroe-Moreno was born in 1964 in Tucson, Arizona, moving to Nevada in 1994. She worked for the Maricopa County Sheriff's Office and later as a corrections officer for the North Las Vegas Police Department. Monroe-Moreno was a member of the North Las Vegas Steering Committee from 2000 until 2002. She served as second vice chair of the Clark County Democratic Party from 2011 until 2015, and was elected to the Assembly in 2016, defeating Howard Brean with nearly 60% of the vote.

In April 2017, Monroe-Moreno introduced a bill in the Assembly which would ban private prisons in the state. Despite it passing in both the House and Senate, the bill was vetoed by Governor Brian Sandoval, who stated, "...because the bill improperly encroaches on the authority and discretion of the executive branch of state government, including the State Board of Prison Commissioners, I cannot support it."

In March 2023, Monroe-Moreno, a moderate, was elected chair of the Nevada Democratic Party beating incumbent Judith Whitmer, a Democratic Socialist. Monroe-Moreno is the first Black woman to chair the Nevada Democratic Party.

On November 4, 2026, Monroe-Moreno defeated City Councilman Scott Black to become the Mayor of North Las Vegas.

== Personal life ==
Monroe-Moreno has three daughters; Candace, Cassandra, and Celena and two step-sons; Colin and Aaron, and six grandchildren.

== Political positions ==
Monroe-Moreno supports increasing the minimum wage. She also supports increased funding for behavior and mental health programs.

== Electoral history ==
Nevada Assembly District 1 election, 2016
Party	Candidate	Votes	%
Democratic	Daniele Monroe-Moreno	16,473	59.50
Republican	Howard Brean	11,214	40.50
Total votes		27,687	100.00

2020 Nevada Assembly District 1 election
Party	Candidate	Votes	%
Democratic	Daniele Monroe-Moreno (incumbent)	25,443	100.00%
Total votes		25,443	100.00%

Nevada Assembly
Preceded by Steven Yeager	Speaker pro tempore of the Nevada Assembly; 2023–present	Incumbent
Party political offices
Preceded by Judith Whitmer	Chair of the Nevada Democratic Party; 2023–present	Incumbent
