= Tick Segerblom =

American attorney and politician

Chair of the Clark County Commission
- In office January 2, 2024 – January 6, 2026
- Preceded by: James B. Gibson
- Succeeded by: Michael Naft

Vice Chair of the Clark County Commission
- In office January 3, 2023 – January 2, 2024
- Preceded by: Justin Jones
- Succeeded by: William McCurdy II

Member of the Clark County Commission from District E
- Incumbent
- Assumed office January 1, 2019
- Preceded by: Chris Giunchigliani

Member of the Nevada Senate from the 3rd district
- In office February 4, 2013 – December 4, 2018
- Preceded by: Valerie Wiener
- Succeeded by: Chris Brooks

Member of the Nevada Assembly from the 9th district
- In office January 1, 2007 – January 7, 2013
- Preceded by: Chris Giunchigliani
- Succeeded by: Andrew Martin

Personal details
- Born: August 4, 1948 (age 78) Boulder City, Nevada, U.S.
- Party: Democratic
- Spouse: Sharon Segerblom
- Relatives: Gene Segerblom (mother)
- Education: Pomona College (BA); University of Denver (JD)
- Website: Campaign website

Richard L. "Tick" Segerblom (born August 4, 1948) is an American attorney and politician serving as a member of the Clark County Commission from District E. First elected to the Nevada Assembly to represent Assembly District 9 in 2006, he was elected to the Nevada Senate in 2012 to represent Senate District 3.

== Early life and education ==
Segerblom is a fourth-generation Nevada representative. He is the descendant of Mormon pioneers on his mother’s side. His mother, Gene Segerblom, served in the Nevada Assembly from 1992 through 2000 and was a member of the Boulder City, Nevada City Council. His grandmother, Hazel Wines, served in the Nevada Assembly from 1934 to 1936, representing Humboldt County.

Segerblom earned a Bachelor of Arts degree from Pomona College and a Juris Doctor from the Sturm College of Law at the University of Denver.

== Career ==
As a Clark County commissioner, Segerblom represents District E which includes a part of the City of Las Vegas in downtown as well as East Las Vegas. As a senator, Segerblom represented Senate District 3 which encompasses a portion of urban Clark County including portions of the City of Las Vegas, the historic Alta Drive, Spanish Oaks, Scotch 80s, and the Charleston Heights neighborhoods and portions of Chinatown. Areas of interest include Lorenzi Park, the Meadows Mall, the Las Vegas Springs Preserve, the College of Southern Nevada, the Rawson-Neal Psychiatric Hospital and the World Market Center Las Vegas, Symphony Park including Smith Center for the Performing Arts, the Lou Ruvo Center for Brain Health, the Clark County Government Center, the Las Vegas Premium Outlets North, the Las Vegas Metropolitan Police Department Headquarters and the Las Vegas Medical District.

Segerblom said that if no other Democrat ran for governor of Nevada against incumbent Republican Brian Sandoval in the 2014 election, he would.

In 2021, Segerblom ran to succeed the retiring William McCurdy II as chair of the Nevada Democratic Party, having previously served as chair from 1990 to 1994. In the March election, which was conducted virtually, he was defeated by Clark County Democratic Party chair Judith Whitmer.

== Personal life ==
Segerblom was given his nickname "Tick" from a bout of hiccups when he was a child.

Political offices
Preceded by James B. Gibson	Chair of the Clark County Commission; 2024–present	Incumbent
Preceded by Justin Jones	Vice Chair of the Clark County Commission; 2023–2024	Succeeded by William McCurdy II
Preceded by Chris Giunchigliani	Member of the Clark County Commission from District E 2019–present	Incumbent
