= East Career and Technical Academy =

East Career & Technical Academy

Location
- 6705 Vegas Valley Drive; Las Vegas, Nevada 89142; United States
- 36.13657°N 115.02752°W

Information
- School type: Public magnet high school
- Established: 2007
- School district: Clark County School District
- Principal: Natasha Lerutte
- Teaching staff: 76.00 (on an FTE basis)
- Grades: 9-12
- Enrollment: 1,911 (2023-2024)
- Student to teacher ratio: 24.54
- Colors: Dark Blue and Silver
- Mascot: Titan
- Publication: The Mountain View
- Yearbook: The Shield
- Website: www.easttechtitans.com

East Career and Technical Academy, also known as East Tech or ECTA, is a public magnet secondary school in Sunrise Manor, Nevada. It educates grades 9–12 in the Clark County School District. The school was founded in 2007. Darlin Delgado served as principal until late 2020. Trish Taylor served as principal from early 2021 to April 2024. and Natasha Lerutte has served as principal since May 2024. The school's 2022-2023 enrollment was 1,988.

== Programs ==
The school offers nine technical programs, split into two Houses, that any student can choose from during admission period:

1. Silver House, which includes: Early Childhood Education, Marketing and Hospitality, Mechanical Technology, Sports Medicine, and Medical Professions.
2. Blue House, which includes: Culinary, Construction, Information Technology, and Teaching and Training.

== Graduation Requirement ==
To graduate from the school, all students must meet the requirements for the curriculum:

1. Minimum GPA average of 3.00 (both weighted and unweighted) for core curriculum subjects: English, Mathematics, Natural Science, and Social Science and History.
2. Completed at least 23 units for graduating with standard diploma, starting from 2022.

== Awards ==
The school was awarded with Magnet School of America's Dr. Ronald P. Simpson Distinguished Merit Award in 2018.
