= Vegas Creek, Nevada =

Vegas Creek
- Former CDP
- Location within the state of Nevada
- Coordinates: 36°07′47″N 115°04′46″W
- Country: United States
- State: Nevada
- Counties: Clark

Area
  - Land: 5.40 sq mi (13.98 km^{2})
- Time zone: UTC-8 (Pacific (PST))
  - Summer (DST): UTC-7 (PDT)
- ZIP code: 89121
- Area code: 702
- FIPS code: 32-78400

Vegas Creek was a census-designated place in Clark County, Nevada (southeast of Las Vegas) during the 1970 United States census. The population recorded was 8,970. The census area dissolved and was added to the CDP area of Sunrise Manor in 1980. The ZIP code serving the area is 89121.

== Geography ==
Located at 36.129740 north and 115.074270 west, the census area of Vegas Creek was bounded by the census areas of Winchester and Paradise (Boulder Highway) to the west and East Las Vegas to the south. The land area of the CDP was 5.4 square miles and had a housing unit count of 3,086.

== Education ==
Clark County School District serves the area as well as all of Clark County.
