= Sunrise Manor, Nevada =

Census-designated place in Clark County, Nevada, United States

- Census-designated place
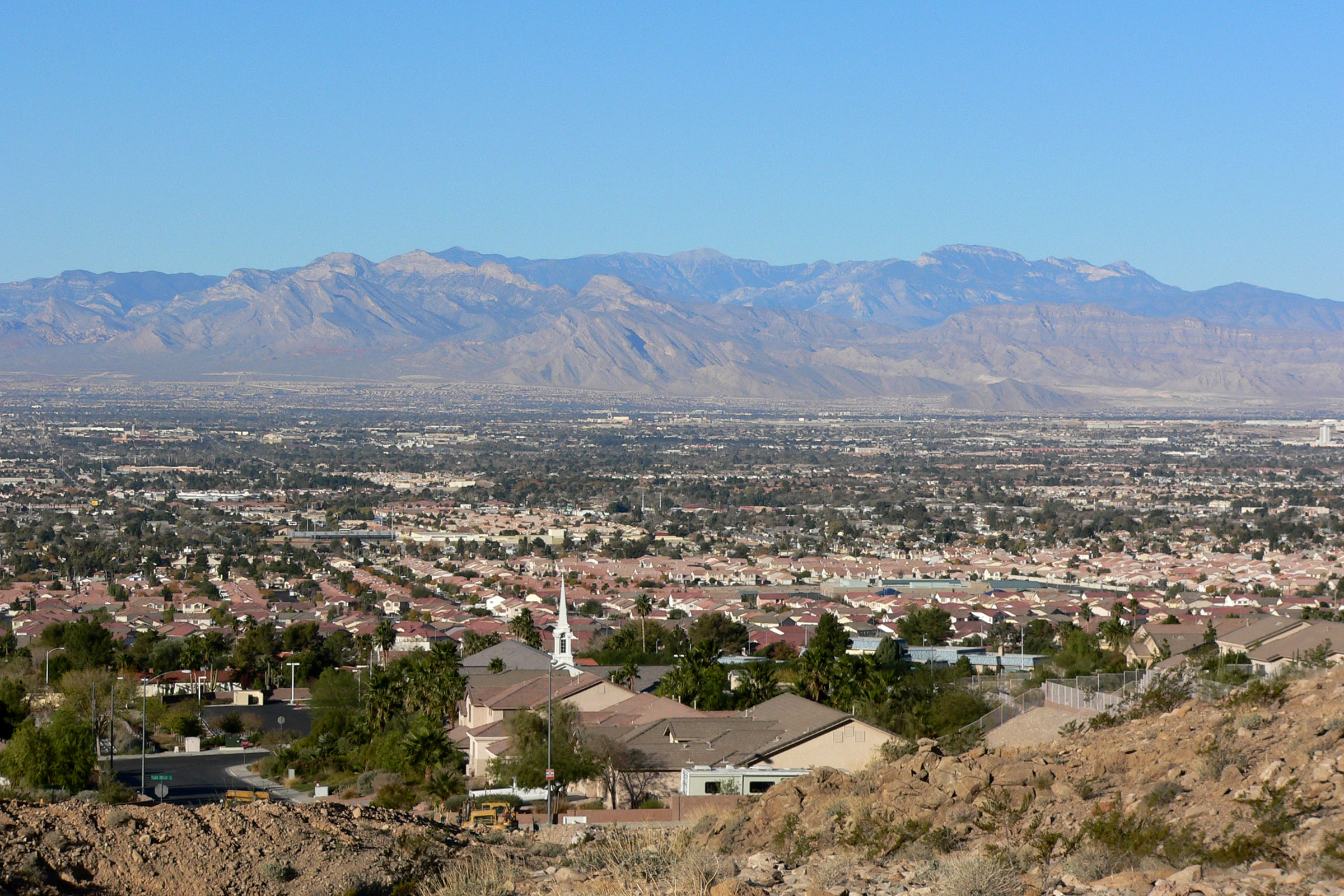
- View of Sunrise Manor from Frenchman Mountain with North Las Vegas in the distance

- Location of Sunrise Manor in Clark County, Nevada

- Location in Nevada Location in the United States
- Coordinates: 36°10′32″N 115°3′35″W
- Country: United States
- State: Nevada
- County: Clark
- Founded: May 1957; 69 years ago
- Founder: Clark County Commission

Area
  - Total: 33.71 sq mi (87.32 km^{2})
  - Land: 33.71 sq mi (87.32 km^{2})
  - Water: 0 sq mi (0.00 km^{2})
- Elevation: 1,821 ft (555 m)

Population (2020)
  - Total: 205,618
  - Density: 6,099.1/sq mi (2,354.87/km^{2})
- Time zone: UTC−8 (PST)
  - Summer (DST): UTC−7 (PDT)
- Area codes: 702 and 725
- FIPS code: 32-71400
- GNIS feature ID: 1867351
- Website: Sunrise Manor Town Advisory Board

Sunrise Manor is a census-designated place in Clark County, Nevada, United States, located on the western base of Frenchman Mountain, east of Las Vegas. The population was 205,618 at the 2020 census. If Sunrise Manor were to be incorporated, it would be one of the largest cities in Nevada. Sunrise Manor was formed in May 1957.

== History ==
In 1957, North Las Vegas was planning for annexation of the area; the Clark County Commission did not approve of it and so created Sunrise Manor in May of the same year. It originally only consisted of the northern fraction of its modern-day boundary. By the time of the 1970 Census, the census-designated place of Vegas Creek was formed to the south of Sunrise Manor. It was dissolved in 1980, and added to Sunrise Manor the same year, roughly making Sunrise Manor's boundaries similar to its modern-day borders.

In 2018, some of the residents of Sunrise Manor proposed incorporation as its own city. This proposed city would include Sunrise Manor and neighboring Whitney. Residents who were for incorporation argued that Sunrise Manor does not get enough recognition being part of Clark County and that a city would need to address crime, drugs, and homelessness, while residents who were against incorporation argued that incorporation will be costly and inefficient, comparing it to North Las Vegas.

On January 31, 2026, the Federal Bureau of Investigation and the Las Vegas Metropolitan Police Department searched a home located on Sugar Springs Drive in Sunrise Manor, containing an illegal biology lab. The home had been owned by Ori Solomon (born 1970/71), an Israeli citizen. A similar lab had been found in Reedley, California in 2023.

== Geography ==
According to the United States Census Bureau, the census-designated place (CDP) of Sunrise Manor (which may not coincide exactly with the town boundaries) has a total area of 33.4 square miles (86.4 km^{2}), all of it land.

== Demographics ==
Historical population
Census	Pop.	Note	%±
1970	10,886		—
1980	44,155		305.6%
1990	95,362		116.0%
2000	156,120		63.7%
2010	189,372		21.3%
2020	205,618		8.6%

=== 2020 census ===
As of the 2020 census, Sunrise Manor had a population of 205,618. The median age was 33.0 years. 27.7% of residents were under the age of 18 and 11.5% of residents were 65 years of age or older. For every 100 females there were 97.9 males, and for every 100 females age 18 and over there were 95.6 males age 18 and over.

99.9% of residents lived in urban areas, while 0.1% lived in rural areas.

There were 67,071 households in Sunrise Manor, of which 40.4% had children under the age of 18 living in them. Of all households, 39.5% were married-couple households, 21.8% were households with a male householder and no spouse or partner present, and 29.4% were households with a female householder and no spouse or partner present. About 21.9% of all households were made up of individuals and 8.1% had someone living alone who was 65 years of age or older.

There were 71,615 housing units, of which 6.3% were vacant. The homeowner vacancy rate was 1.7% and the rental vacancy rate was 7.4%.

Racial composition as of the 2020 census
Race	Number	Percent
White	57,831	28.1%
Black or African American	31,756	15.4%
American Indian and Alaska Native	3,142	1.5%
Asian	11,492	5.6%
Native Hawaiian and Other Pacific Islander	1,343	0.7%
Some other race	63,871	31.1%
Two or more races	36,183	17.6%
Hispanic or Latino (of any race)	112,208	54.6%

=== 2010 census ===
At the census of 2010, there were 189,372 people living in the CDP. The racial makeup was 48.9% White, 12.6% African American, 0.9% Native American, 5.7% Asian, 0.6% Pacific Islander, and 5.1% from two or more races. Hispanic or Latino of any race were 48.5% of the population and 30.2% of the population was non-Hispanic White.

=== 2000 census ===
At the 2000 census there were 156,120 people, 53,745 households, and 38,535 families living in the CDP. The population density was 4,081.8 inhabitants per square mile (1,576.0/km^{2}). There were 58,410 housing units at an average density of 1,527.1 per square mile (589.6/km^{2}). The racial makeup of the CDP was 63.47% White, 12.89% African American, 0.98% Native American, 6.41% Asian, 0.46% Pacific Islander, 10.13% from other races, and 4.67% from two or more races. Hispanic or Latino of any race were 27.02%.

Of the 53,745 households 37.9% had children under the age of 18 living with them, 49.3% were married couples living together, 15.6% had a female householder with no husband present, and 28.3% were non-families. 20.3% of households were one person and 6.0% were one person aged 65 or older. The average household size was 2.88 and the average family size was 3.32.

The age distribution was 29.7% under the age of 18, 9.8% from 18 to 24, 31.3% from 25 to 44, 20.0% from 45 to 64, and 9.2% 65 or older. The median age was 32 years. For every 100 females, there were 99.4 males. For every 100 females age 18 and over, there were 97.0 males.

The median household income was $41,066 and the median family income was $44,339. Males had a median income of $31,175 versus $24,605 for females. The per capita income for the CDP was $16,659. About 10.4% of families and 12.8% of the population were below the poverty line, including 17.0% of those under age 18 and 7.0% of those age 65 or over.

== Landmarks ==
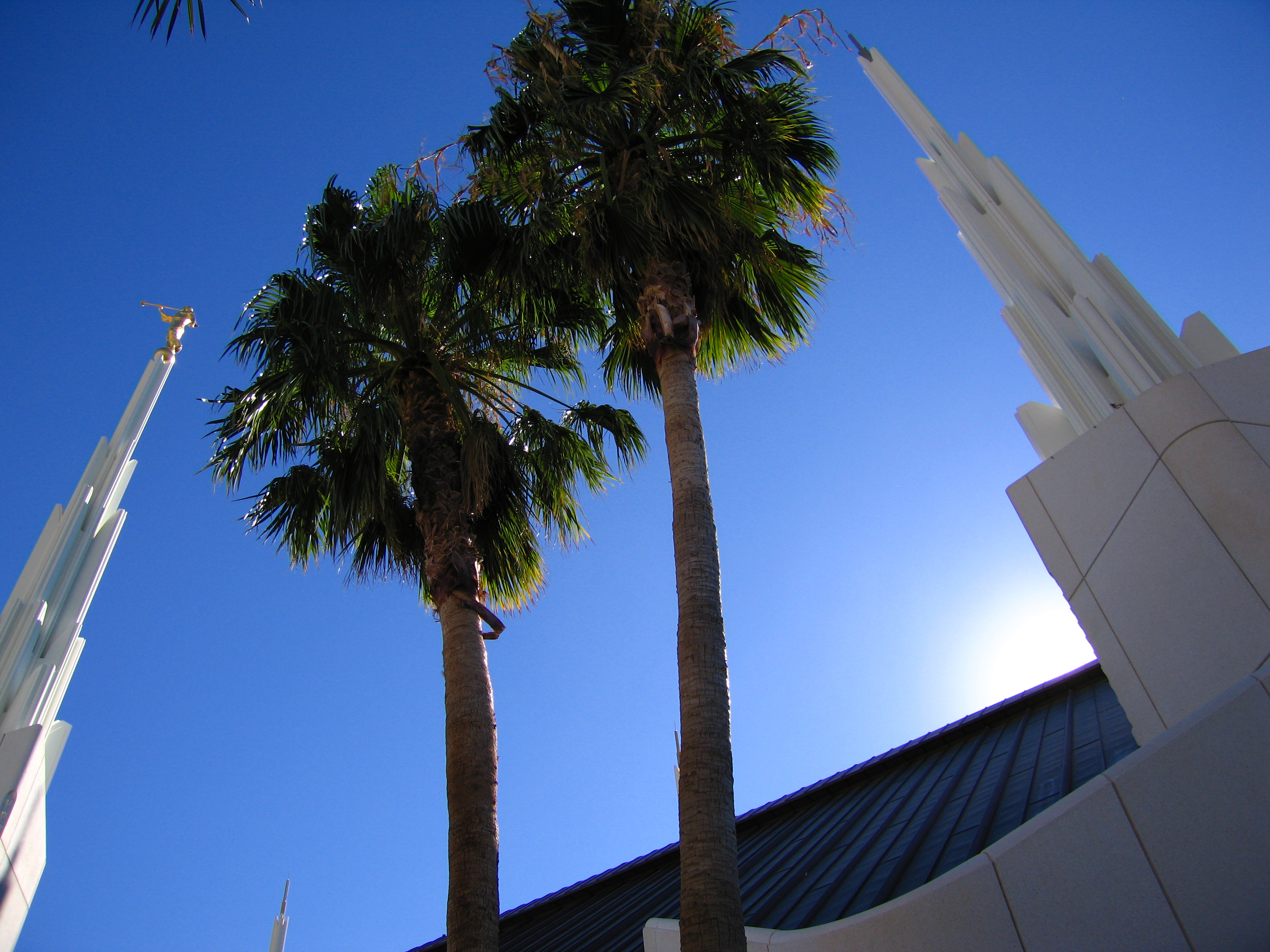
Palm trees are seen on the grounds of the Las Vegas Nevada Temple in Sunrise Manor, August 2006

It is home of the Las Vegas Nevada Temple of the Church of Jesus Christ of Latter-day Saints, which was dedicated on December 16, 1989.

Sam's Town Las Vegas, a casino and entertainment venue that is part of the Boulder Strip, is located in Sunrise Manor.

East Career and Technical Academy (ECTA or East Tech), Eldorado High School, Las Vegas High School and Sunrise Mountain High School serve the Sunrise Manor area. ECTA, a magnet school, opened for the 2008–2009 school year, admitting only freshmen and sophomores; Las Vegas High School, the oldest of the four high schools, opened in 1905; Las Vegas High School opened its new campus in 1993; and Sunrise Mountain High School was established in 2009.

== See also ==
- List of census-designated places in Nevada
