= Clark County Commission =

Government agency that oversees Clark County, Nevada

Clark County Board of County Commissioners
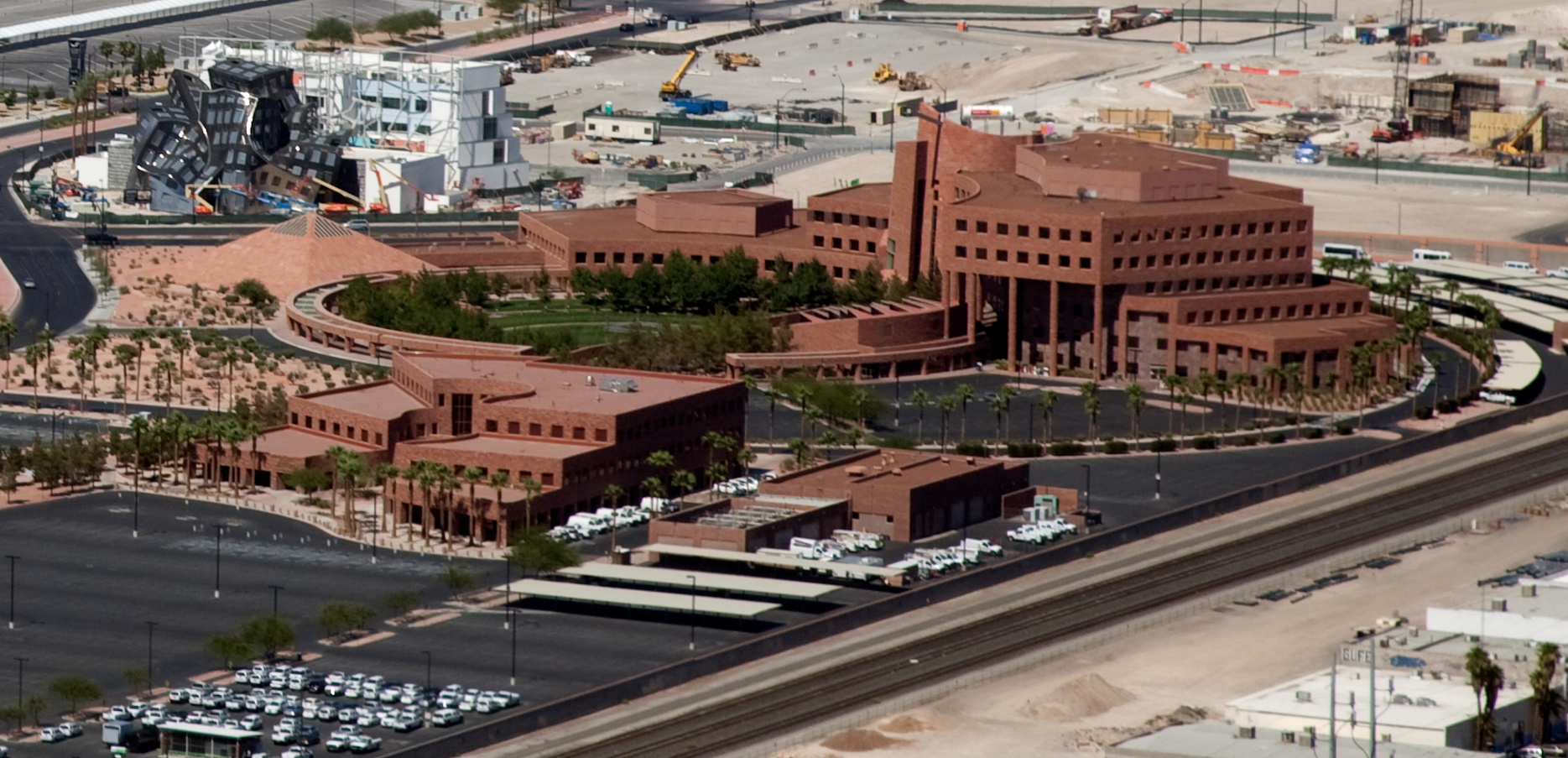
- Clark County Government Center

County commission overview
- Formed: July 1, 1909; 117 years ago
- Preceding County commission: Lincoln County Commission
- Jurisdiction: Government of Clark County
- Headquarters: Clark County Government Center; 500 South Grand Central Parkway; Las Vegas, Nevada, U.S.
- County commission executives: Michael Naft, Chair; William McCurdy II, Vice-chair
- Website: Official website

The Clark County Board of County Commissioners, commonly referred to as the Clark County Commission, is the legislative body of Clark County in the U.S. state of Nevada. Established in 1909, the commission consists of seven members elected by district to four-year terms on a partisan basis. Although technically a legislative body, it exercises some executive powers and serves as the municipal government for unincorporated Clark County residents, estimated by the county as being 1,073,926 people.

Powers and duties include law enforcement, administering state statute regarding health, marriage, divorce, child custody and property and other powers throughout the county’s unincorporated areas including enacting ordinances, budgets, zoning and oversees departments such as the Clark County Fire Department, the Las Vegas Metropolitan Police Department, the Southern Nevada Water Authority, and the Regional Transportation Commission among others. The commission's executive powers are limited, however, by the fact that several executive offices are independently elected by the voters and are autonomous, including the county clerk, district attorney, county recorder, county assessor, sheriff, and public administrator.

The commission appoints the county manager to carry out the day-to-day operations of the Clark County government. The commission has jurisdiction over county-level matters throughout all of Clark County, including the cities of Las Vegas, Henderson, North Las Vegas, Boulder City, and Mesquite in addition to the unincorporated towns, CDPs, and neighborhoods of Whitney, Sunrise Mountain, Southern Highlands, Summerlin, Centennial Hills, Blue Diamond, Jean, among others. As of 2026, the commission is led by Michael Naft (D–District A) as chair and William McCurdy II (D–District D) as vice-chair.

== History ==
In April 1973, the Nevada Legislature passed legislation which merged the offices of the Clark County sheriff with those of the Las Vegas Metropolitan Police Department (LVMPD), creating a new combined county-city unified law enforcement agency. Under the provisions of the law, the Clark County sheriff, an elected position, serves as the head of LVMPD while the chief of police serves as the Clark County undersheriff.

In 2015, the Nevada Legislature granted counties in Nevada the equivalent of home rule. Previously, counties could only exercise power in the ways explicitly outlined by the state. As a result, the Clark County Commission has roughly the same powers as a home rule municipality and is no longer required to have a specific power granted to it by the state, so long as it does not infringe upon federal or state jurisdiction.

== Composition and districts ==
Clark County Board of County Commissioners
District	Expires	Commissioner	In office since	Party
A	2029	Michael Naft (Chair)	2019	Democratic
B	2029	Marilyn Kirkpatrick	2015	Democratic
C	2029	April Becker	2025	Republican
D	2029	William McCurdy II (Vice-Chair)	2021	Democratic
E	2027	Tick Segerblom	2019	Democratic
F	2027	Justin Jones	2019	Democratic
G	2027	James B. Gibson	2017	Democratic

=== District A ===
Michael Naft, a Democrat, represents District A, which intersects the center through southeast part of the Las Vegas Valley and includes part of the city of Las Vegas and west Henderson, as well as the southern end of the Las Vegas Strip. Prior to his appointment to the commission in 2019 by Governor Steve Sisolak, Naft served as district director for Congresswoman Dina Titus.

In the 2024 general election, Naft was re-elected to a second full term, defeating Republican challenger Ryan Hamilton with 51.0% of the vote.

=== District B ===
Marilyn Kirkpatrick, a Democrat, represents District B, which includes parts of North Las Vegas and all of Mesquite, Overton, Moapa and Logandale. A former speaker of the Nevada Assembly, she was appointed to the commission in 2015. Kirkpatrick served as the commission's chair from 2019 to 2021.

Kirkpatrick secured re-election in November 2024, defeating candidate Jesse Welsh with 63.6% of the vote.

=== District C ===
April Becker, a Republican, represents District C, which includes part of the city of Las Vegas as well as Summerlin and Centennial Hills. Upon her swearing-in in January 2025, she became the commission's sole Republican member. A real estate attorney and business owner, Becker previously ran unsuccessfully for Nevada's 3rd congressional district in 2022.

In the November 2024 election, Becker defeated the Democratic nominee, former Nevada Assemblywoman Shannon Bilbray-Axelrod, with 52.6% of the vote. She flipped the seat previously held by Democrat Ross Miller, who did not seek re-election.

=== District D ===
William McCurdy II, a Democrat, represents District D, which encompasses historic west Las Vegas, downtown Las Vegas, and much of North Las Vegas. Before joining the commission in 2021, McCurdy served in the Nevada Assembly and was the youngest chair of the Nevada State Democratic Party.

McCurdy won re-election in 2024, defeating Republican David Gomez with 66.8% of the vote.

=== District E ===
Tick Segerblom, a Democrat, represents District E, which includes east Las Vegas, Lake Las Vegas (part of Henderson) and Sunrise Manor. A fourth-generation Nevada politician, Segerblom served in both the Nevada Assembly and Senate before his election to the commission in 2018. He is frequently noted for his policy work regarding the legalization and regulation of cannabis in Nevada.

Segerblom was re-elected in 2022 with 53.0% of the vote. His current term expires in January 2027.

=== District F ===
Justin Jones, a Democrat, represents District F, which includes Spring Valley and the southwest rim of the Las Vegas Valley as well as Sloan, Jean, Primm, Sandy Valley, and Blue Diamond. A lawyer and former state senator, Jones was first elected to the commission in 2018. He has been active in conservation efforts, including the protection of Red Rock Canyon National Conservation Area.

Jones was re-elected in 2022. In September 2025, Jones announced that he would not seek re-election to a third term in 2026.

=== District G ===
Jim Gibson, a Democrat, represents District G, which covers most of the city of Henderson, Green Valley and the Water Street District in addition to Whitney as well as Harry Reid International Airport. Gibson previously served as the mayor of Henderson for three terms. He was appointed to the commission in 2017 by Governor Brian Sandoval and subsequently won election in 2018 and re-election in 2022.

Gibson's current term expires in January 2027.

== Partisan control ==
As of December 2025, non-partisan voters are the largest single block in the county, making up 38.91% (602,356) of all active registrations. The next largest group include members of the Democratic Party at 29.98% (464,162), Republican Party at 24.61% (381,059) with the remaining 6.5% of voters belonging to various third parties, including the Libertarian Party of Nevada, the Independent American Party of Nevada, among others.

Currently, six of the commissioners are Democrats and one is a Republican.

Party representation on the Clark County Commission
Affiliation	Members
Democratic Party	6
Republican Party	1
Total	7

== Ex officio boards ==
The Clark County commissioners, as a group, sit on the following boards, ex officio:

- Big Bend Water District
- Clark County Department of Aviation
- Clark County Liquor and Gaming Board
- Clark County Regional Flood Control District
- Clark County Sanitation District
- Clark County Water Reclamation District
- Kyle Canyon Water District
- Las Vegas Convention and Visitors Authority
- Las Vegas Stadium Authority
- Las Vegas Valley Water District
- Regional Transportation Commission of Southern Nevada
- Southern Nevada Health District
- Southern Nevada Regional Housing Authority
- Southern Nevada Water Authority
- University Medical Center of Southern Nevada

== Early 2000s corruption scandal ==
In 2006, former commissioners Dario Herrera, Erin Kenny, Mary Kincaid-Chauncey and Lance Malone were convicted of corruption after an investigation from 2002 to 2006 by the Department of Justice The four commissioners were convicted of multiple corruption charges on May 5, 2006. were convicted of conspiracy and multiple counts of wire fraud and extortion under color of law for depriving the commission and the citizens of Clark County of their right to the honest services of public officials. They were sentenced to federal prison terms.

== See also ==
- Clark County, Nevada
- Clark County sheriff
- Las Vegas Metropolitan Police Department
- List of counties in Nevada
