= Judith Whitmer =

American politician

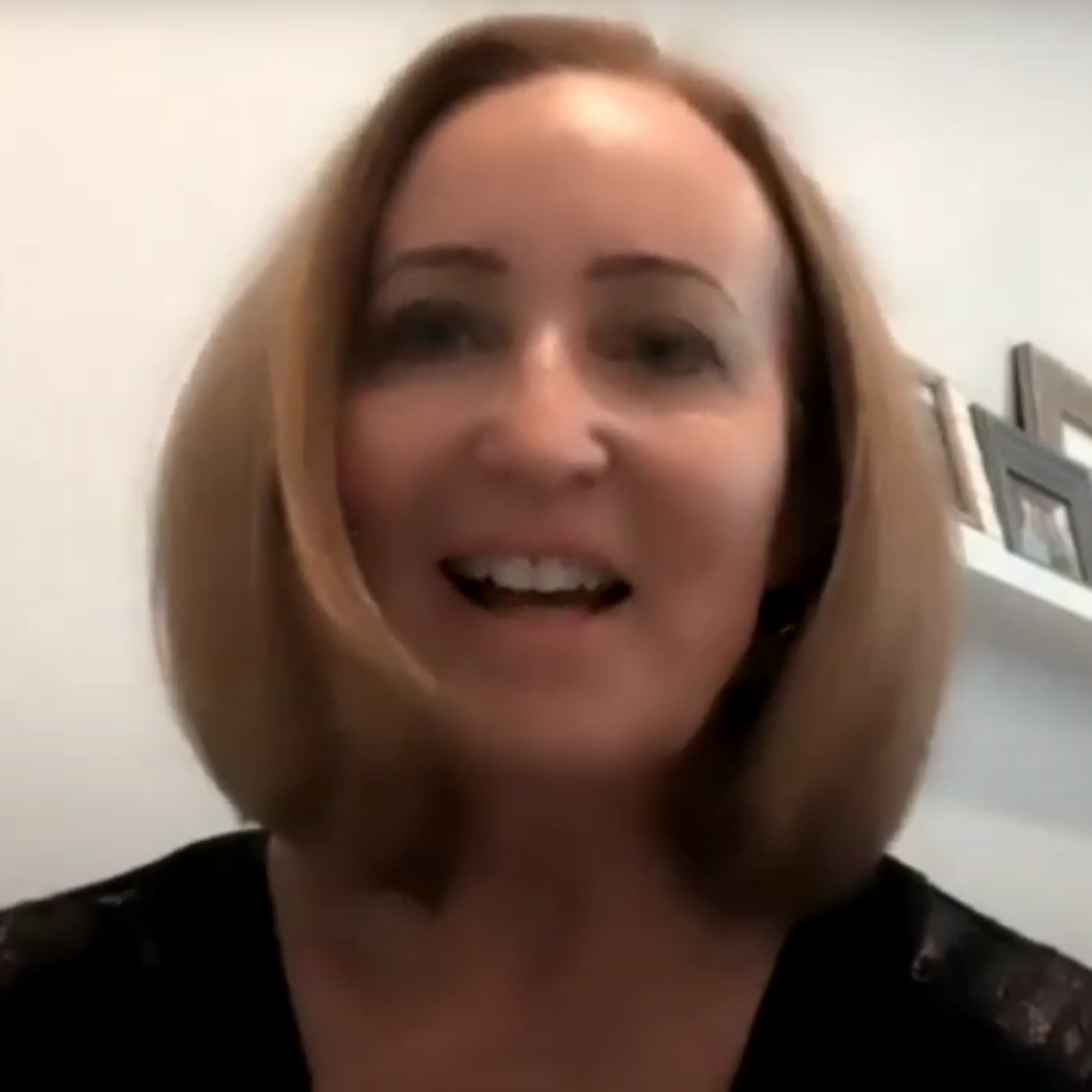
- Whitmer in 2021

Chair of the Nevada Democratic Party
- In office March 6, 2021 – March 4, 2023
- Preceded by: William McCurdy II
- Succeeded by: Daniele Monroe-Moreno

Personal details
- Party: Democratic
- Education: Seminole State College of Florida (BA)

Judith K. Whitmer is an American political activist who served as the chair of the Nevada Democratic Party from 2021 to 2023. Whitmer was elected on March 6, 2021, by members of the party's governing members, defeating Tick Segerblom in a 248–216 vote. She lost re-election to "unity candidate" Daniele Monroe-Moreno in a 314–99 vote.

== Education ==
Whitmer earned a Bachelor of Arts degree from the Seminole State College of Florida.

== Career ==
Whitmer was a volunteer on Barack Obama's 2008 and 2012 campaigns. She also worked on the campaign of Martin O'Malley and for various members of the Nevada Legislature. Whitmer has stated that the Bernie Sanders 2016 presidential campaign led her to become involved in party politics. She was a Sanders delegate in 2020.

In 2021 Whitmer was elected chair of the Nevada Democratic Party along with a new slate of party leaders, all affiliated with the Democratic Socialists of America. Upon her election, the entire staff of the party resigned from their positions in protest.

During her tenure as party chair, Whitmer received heavy criticism from a number of key figures. Top Democrats sought for her removal and then asked for her resignation, and many former loyalists including Senator Bernie Sanders did not support her when she ran for re-election in 2023.

Party political offices
Preceded by William McCurdy II	Chair of the Nevada Democratic Party; 2021–2023	Succeeded by Daniele Monroe-Moreno
