= John Oceguera =

American politician

Speaker of the Nevada Assembly
- In office February 7, 2011 – February 4, 2013
- Preceded by: Barbara Buckley
- Succeeded by: Marilyn Kirkpatrick

Member of the Nevada Assembly from the Clark County 16 district
- In office 2000 – 2012

Personal details
- Born: 1968 (age 57–58) Reno, Nevada, U.S.
- Party: Democratic
- Spouse: Janie Oceguera
- Children: 3
- Education: Western Nevada College (AA); Truckee Meadows Community College (AS); Cogswell College (BS); University of Nevada, Las Vegas (MPA, JD)
- Occupation: Assistant Chief, North Las Vegas Fire Department

John Oceguera (born 1968 in Reno, Nevada) is a Democratic politician. He represented Clark County District 16 in the Nevada Assembly from 2001 to 2013 and was elected speaker of the Assembly in 2011. Oceguera is a member of the Walker River Paiute tribe, and is the first Native American to serve as Speaker in Nevada history.

== 2012 U.S. House campaign ==
Oceguera was the 2012 Democratic nominee for Nevada's 3rd congressional district, challenging incumbent Republican nominee Joe Heck. He announced he was running on July 18, 2012. He lost his bid for the house failing to unseat Joe Heck as congressman for the 3rd District.

== Personal life ==
He lives in Northwest Las Vegas with his wife, Janie, and their three children: Jackson, Jillian, and Jameson.
