= Cannery Casino and Hotel =

Hotel and casino in Nevada, United States

Coordinates: 36°14′18.7″N 115°7′6.77″W

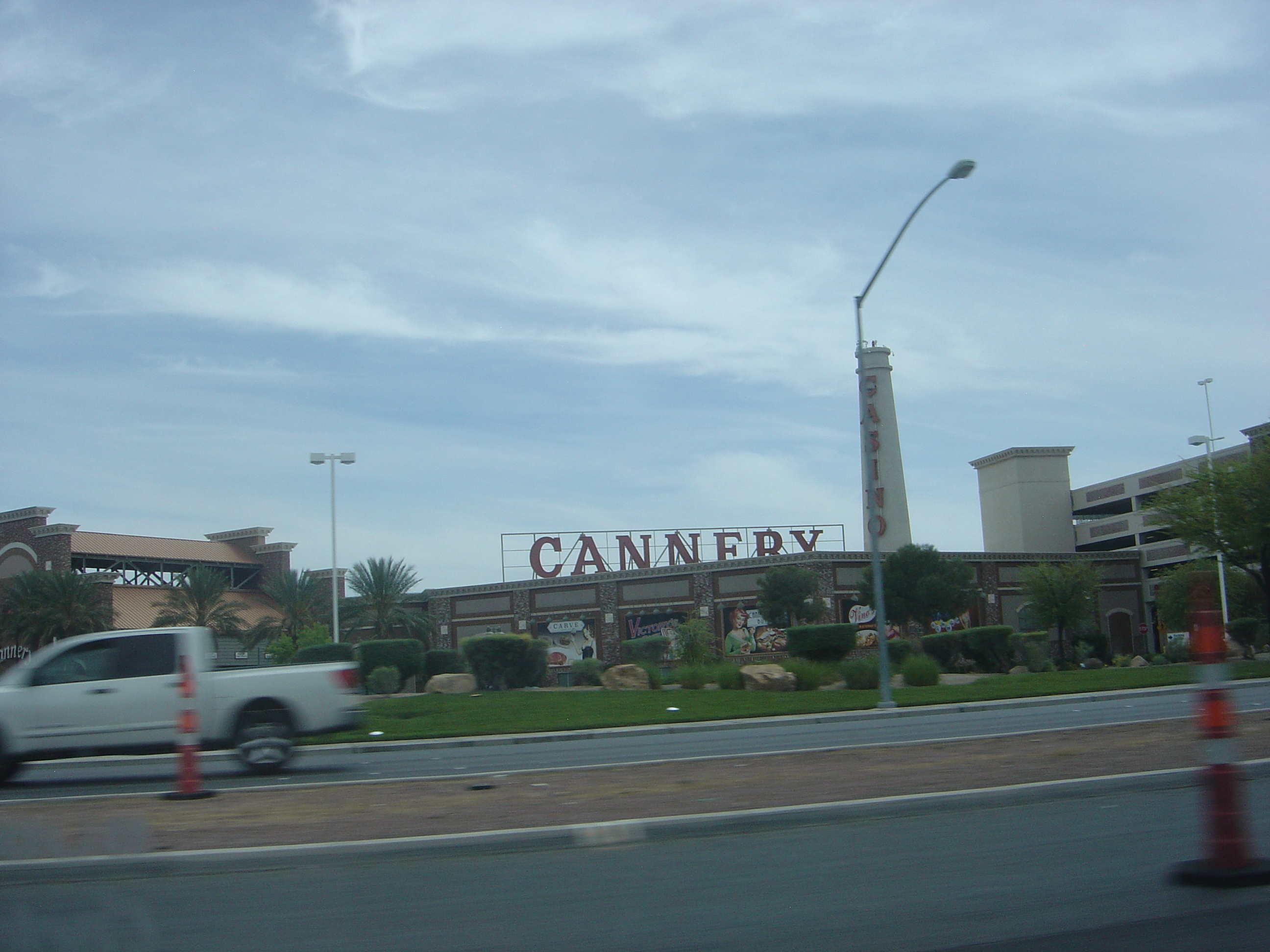
- Interactive map of Cannery Casino and Hotel
- Location: North Las Vegas, Nevada 89030; 2121 East Craig Rd.
- Opened: January 2, 2003; 23 years ago
- No. of rooms: 201
- Gaming space: 78,967 square feet (7,336.3 m^{2})
- Signature attractions: Galaxy Theatres
- Notable restaurants: Steak 'n Shake
- Owner: Boyd Gaming
- Renovated in: 2004–2006
- Website: www.cannerycasino.com

Cannery Casino and Hotel is a locals casino in North Las Vegas, Nevada, USA, owned and operated by Boyd Gaming. The property includes a 78,967 sq ft (7,336.3 m^{2}) casino and a three-story hotel with 201 rooms. It was developed by Cannery Casino Resorts at a cost of $105 million. It opened on January 2, 2003.

A $40 million expansion took place from 2004 to 2006, adding more casino space and a movie theater. A second location, the Eastside Cannery, opened in the eastern Las Vegas Valley in 2008 and demolished in 2026. Boyd acquired both properties in 2016, when it purchased Cannery Casino Resorts.

== History ==
The property was originally proposed as the Paradise hotel-casino in 1996, by Bob Mendenhall, president of Las Vegas Paving Corporation. It would be developed through the Mendenhall Family Trust. The site for the proposed project was in an area zoned for industrial use. For this reason, the North Las Vegas City Council rejected Mendenhall's request in 1998 to rezone the land for the Paradise project. Residents had also voiced opposition about a hotel-casino, believing it would worsen traffic. The city then denied Mendenhall's extension request for his use permit to build the project. He filed a lawsuit against the city that was later settled out of court. Millennium Gaming partnered with Mendenhall in 2000, and Cannery Casino Resorts was formed as a joint venture to develop the project, which would be renamed the Cannery.

The Cannery cost $105 million to develop. APCO, a subsidiary of Las Vegas Paving, was the project's general contractor. Early plans to include go-karts, a bowling alley, and a movie theater were scrapped, as Millennium believed that such features would attract children to the property. The Cannery was initially set for a mid-December 2002 opening, although this was delayed several weeks to take place in the new year. The delay allowed the owners to save $90,000 in taxes and fees, and also simplified the Cannery's job search, as many prospective employees preferred to wait until after the Christmas holiday to start working a new job.

The Cannery opened on the night of January 2, 2003, with hundreds of guests in attendance. The property is themed after a 1940s cannery, post-World War II, with architectural features such as industrial beams and exposed metal columns. The exterior features a 120-foot smokestack. A brewery theme was previously considered before evolving into the final design.

The Cannery includes a three-story hotel containing 201 rooms. The casino opened with 50,000 square feet (4,600 m^{2}), including 1,278 slot machines and 21 table games. The Cannery featured four restaurants, including a 360-seat buffet and a 24-hour cafe. It also opened along with The Club, an indoor-outdoor, multi-purpose events center. The indoor venue measures 7,000 sq ft (650 m^{2}), and opens up to a 25,000 sq ft (2,300 m^{2}) courtyard.

The property's primary demographic would be the 250,000 residents who lived within a five-mile radius. Its location near Interstate 15, Las Vegas Motor Speedway, and Nellis Air Force Base also made the site desirable. Executives sought to copy the success of other locals casinos in Las Vegas, for instance by having the Cannery operate its own hotel rather than partnering with a chain, a concept that was deemed expensive and unnecessary. The Cannery was small compared to its competitors, a trait which executives viewed as a positive.

The Cannery was successful, leading to a two-year, $40 million expansion which began in mid-2004. The project added a parking garage and more casino space, for a total of 78,967 sq ft (7,336.3 m^{2}). This was followed by the opening of a 14-screen Galaxy Theatres facility in 2006.

A second Las Vegas Valley location, the Eastside Cannery, opened along Boulder Highway in 2008. Both properties became part of Boyd Gaming in December 2016, through its acquisition of Cannery Casino Resorts. A Steak 'n Shake restaurant was added in 2022.
