= Big Bend Water District =

Government agency that services Laughlin, Nevada

Agency overview
- Formed: 1983
- Jurisdiction: Laughlin, Nevada

Big Bend Water District is a government agency that was created in 1983 to service the community of Laughlin, Nevada. It is governed by the Clark County Commission and operated by the Las Vegas Valley Water District. It is a member agency of the Southern Nevada Water Authority.

The district includes the Big Bend Water Treatment Facility which treats and supplies clean water to the 7,500 residents of Laughlin and the tourists who visit its casinos. The plant has a treatment capacity of 15 million US gallons (57,000 m^{3}) per day and can store up to 6 million US gallons (23,000 m^{3}) of water for later use.
