= Harvey Munford =

American politician (1940–2023)

Member of the Nevada Assembly from the Clark County 6 district
- In office 2004 – November 9, 2016
- Succeeded by: William McCurdy

Personal details
- Born: July 19, 1940 Akron, Ohio, U.S.
- Died: October 26, 2023 (aged 83)
- Party: Democratic
- Spouse: Viviana
- Education: Montana State University Billings
- Profession: educator

Harvey Munford (July 19, 1940 – October 26, 2023) was an American politician who was a Democratic member of the Nevada Assembly, representing the Clark County District 6 from 2004 until 2016.

== Personal life ==
Harvey Munford was born on July 19, 1940, in Akron, Ohio. Munford practiced the religion of Baptist Christianity. He was married to Viviana. Munford died on October 26, 2023, at the age of 83.

== Legislative Committees ==
Munford was a member of the following committees: Education, Member; Elections, Procedures, Ethics, and Constitutional Amendments, Member; Government Affairs, Member; Natural Resources, Agriculture and Mining, Member; and Taxation, Vice Chair

== Education ==
Munford received an MA degree in Counseling and Political Science, as well as a BA degree in Biology and Physical Education, from Montana State University, Billings.

== Professional experience ==
Munford was a school teacher for the Clark County School District. He also played basketball for the Los Angeles Lakers.
