= 1997 Nevada floods =

Natural disaster in Nevada, United States

- Date: January 1–3, 1997
- Location: Western and northern Nevada
- Deaths: 2
- Property damage: $450 million

Severe floods occurred in western and northern Nevada from January 1–3, 1997, resulting in two deaths and causing $450 million in building damage. Washoe County, which includes the Reno-Sparks area, saw the worst of the damage. Flooding also impacted five other counties, as well as Carson City.

The floods occurred along the Carson River, Truckee River, and Walker River. Unseasonably warm rain melted excessive snowpack into the rivers, resulting in the floods. It was the most costly and damaging flood event to occur in 150 years of record-keeping for the three rivers.

== Flooding overview ==
The 1997 floods occurred along three rivers in western and northern Nevada. The Carson River runs through the state capital of Carson City as well as four counties: Churchill, Douglas, Lyon, and Storey. The Walker River runs through Douglas, Lyon, and Mineral County. The Truckee River flows through Washoe County, including the Reno-Sparks area.

The floods were caused by unseasonably warm rain which partially melted excessive snowpack in the three rivers. A trio of heavy snowstorms from the Gulf of Alaska had hit the Sierra Nevada region during the last three weeks of 1996, followed by three subtropical storms originating in the Pacific Ocean, the third of which was a Pineapple Express. Aside from Nevada, the same storm system also caused flooding in several other states, including California, Idaho, Oregon and Washington.

In Nevada, the floods began on January 1, 1997, and continued over the next two days as water made its way through several counties. In Sparks, the Truckee River reached flood stage at 2:00 a.m. on January 1, followed by Reno at 10:30 a.m. The river's flood stage was 12 feet, and it crested at 14.7 feet on January 2, breaking the last record of 13.8 in 1950. The river experienced widespread flooding throughout its 90-mile course between Lake Tahoe and Pyramid Lake. The river level rose 7 feet, eventually receding from flood stage on January 3. The Truckee River had an early warning system – consisting of gauges – that performed inadequately in predicting the flood severity. The United States Geological Survey (USGS) had approximately 100 gauging stations covering the three rivers, and 35 of these stations were damaged by the floodwaters, with 6 being completely destroyed.

The floods covered approximately 63,800 acres (25,800 ha). Although initially considered a 100-year flood event, a study by the USGS found it to be less than a 50-year event. The U.S. Army Corps of Engineers (USACE) considered it a 60-year event, while the Federal Emergency Management Agency (FEMA) believed it to be a 75-year event.

== Damage and effects ==
The 1997 floods were the worst to hit Carson City and Reno since 1955, and were the most costly and damaging to occur in 150 years of record-keeping for the three rivers. However, the flood severity along the Truckee River was alleviated by three dams, which were built following floods in the 1950s.

The floods resulted in numerous business closures, including several casinos in Reno, where some streets saw up to four feet of water. State government buildings in Carson City and Reno were flooded and forced to close as well. Reno–Tahoe International Airport closed on January 2, stranding 1,000 tourists before reopening the next day. The airport's only east–west runway eventually required $33 million in repair work. Floodwaters tore out bridges along the Truckee River and also swept large trees downriver. Mudslides also occurred, resulting in the closure of Highway 50 at Spooner Summit, as well as Interstate 80 near the California-Nevada border.

In Carson City, officials had prepared with the use of 4,000 sandbags for flood control, although this proved to be inadequate. It was later estimated that 100,000 sandbags would have been needed. Most damage in Carson City came from floodwaters rushing downstream from several canyons, eventually flooding streets. The Carson River also runs through Dayton, where flooding affected ranches and mobile homes, as well as Dayton State Park. The Walker River reached flood stage on January 3 as waters reached the small city of Yerington, which experienced flood damage across 500 homes and businesses.

The floods resulted in two deaths, including a 59-year-old Gardnerville man who drowned in the Carson River. His remains were found nearly a year later. The other victim was a 53-year-old man from Sun Valley who disappeared along the Truckee River. Skeletal remains, possibly belonging to the latter victim, were found in January 1998.

== Response and aftermath ==
On January 2, 1997, Nevada governor Bob Miller toured flood-damaged areas by helicopter, and declared a state of emergency for Carson City as well as four counties: Douglas, Lyon, Storey, and Washoe. The following day, U.S. president Bill Clinton declared the affected counties as a major disaster area, making them eligible for federal assistance programs. Two additional counties, Churchill and Mineral, were designated for assistance on January 15.

Much of the flood damage occurred in Washoe County. Clean-up efforts in Reno ramped up on January 3, as water began to recede. The flood's financial cost led to the permanent closure of several small casinos there. Early estimates of statewide damage, compiled by several government sources, put the cost at $632.5 million, including $540.2 million in Washoe County. The final cost of statewide building damage was estimated by USACE at $450 million, while local officials estimated total flood damage at $680 million when taking business losses into account. The state had a $123 million emergency fund.

In 1998, Reno and Sparks agreed to donate land to be used for future flood control projects. Two years later, Washoe County residents created a community coalition to work on flood prevention. In the Carson City area, more than $36 million in flood control projects had been completed as of 2006. The Truckee River Flood Management Authority (TRFMA) was also formed in 2011 and took measures as well to mitigate future floods.

== See also ==
- 1999 Las Vegas flood
