= Marilyn Kirkpatrick =

American politician (born 1967)

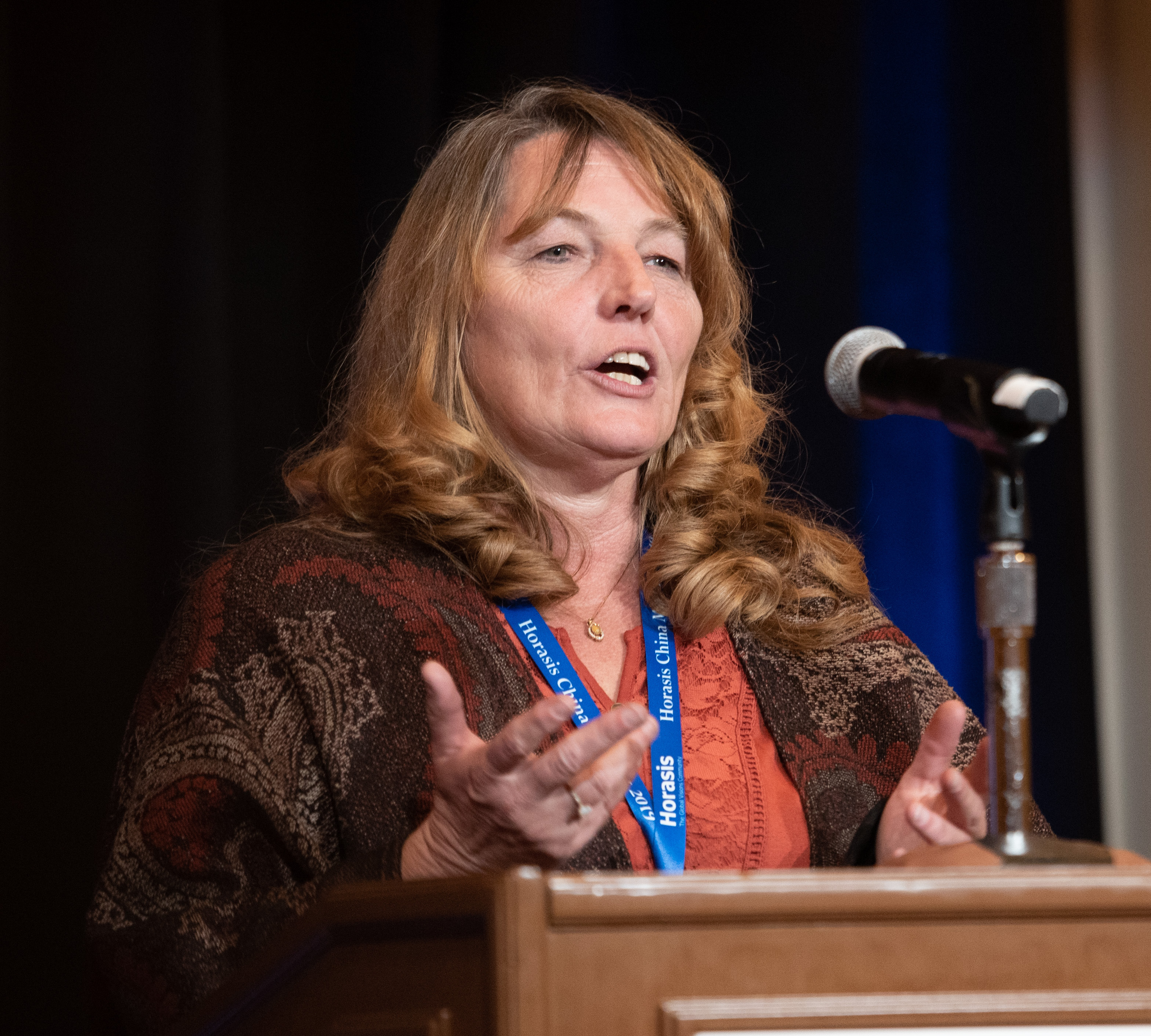
- Marilyn Kirkpatrick speaking at Horasis Global China Business Meeting 2019

Chair of the Clark County Commission
- In office January 7, 2019 – January 4, 2022
- Preceded by: Steve Sisolak
- Succeeded by: James B. Gibson

Member of the Clark County Commission from District B
- Incumbent
- Assumed office August 18, 2015
- Appointed by: Brian Sandoval
- Preceded by: Tom Collins

Speaker of the Nevada Assembly
- In office February 4, 2013 – February 2, 2015
- Preceded by: John Oceguera
- Succeeded by: John Hambrick

Member of the Nevada Assembly from the 1st district
- In office 2004–2015

Personal details
- Born: March 11, 1967 (age 59)
- Party: Democratic (1995–present)
- Spouse: Michael
- Occupation: Sales

Marilyn Kaye Kirkpatrick (born March 11, 1967) is an American politician. She was the chairwoman of the Clark County Commission. She was a member of the Nevada Assembly, representing Clark County District 1 from 2004 to 2015. She is a member of the Democratic Party.

== See also ==
- List of female speakers of legislatures in the United States

Political offices
Preceded by Tom Collins	Member of the Clark County Commission from District B 2015–present	Incumbent
Preceded by Steve Sisolak	Chair of the Clark County Commission; 2019–2022	Succeeded by James B. Gibson
