= Boulder Strip (Nevada gaming area) =

Nevada Gaming Control Board reporting area

The Boulder Strip gaming market is a division used by the Nevada Gaming Commission for a segment of the casino industry in Las Vegas, Nevada, United States. The region is named for the Boulder Highway which is the dominant highway in the region.

The American Gaming Association lists Boulder Strip as #10 out of the top 20 US Casino Markets by annual revenue, just ahead of Reno/Sparks, Nev.

== Gaming Revenue of Boulder Strip Casinos ==
The Nevada Gaming Commission publishes revenue in its annual Gaming Abstract report, covering the preceding fiscal year (1 July through 30 June). For fiscal year 2008 (1 July 2007 through 31 June 2008), the Boulder Strip market was compared to Downtown Las Vegas. Licenses in Boulder Strip are only reported in one group. All 32 casinos in the Boulder Strip group make more than $1 M in gaming revenue annually.

Las Vegas Downtown vs. the Boulder Strip Casinos Annual (FY2008) gaming revenue
Boulder Strip	Category	Downtown
all (>$1 M)	Category	all (>$1 M)
32	Number of Casinos	16
$83,729,046	Pit (includes Keno and Bingo)	$135,223,563
$795,635,991	Coin operated devices (includes Slots)	$462,772,641
$11,982,658	Poker and Pan	$8,656,695
$12,118,815	Race Book	$3,157,740
$14,563,378	Sports Pool	$4,489,416
$918,029,888	Total Gaming Revenue	$614,300,055
$28,688,434	Average Gaming Revenue/Site	$55,845,460
$1,248,175,924	Total Revenue (includes Rooms, Food, Beverage, and Other)	$1,100,311,344
$39,005,498	Average Total Revenue/Site	$68,769,459

The Boulder Strip market is more dependent on slot machines than Downtown Las Vegas. The casinos are mostly oriented toward locals. Race and Sports book are more important. The entire Boulder Strip market (gaming and non-gaming) is a little smaller than the revenue generated by the Las Vegas properties of Wynn Resorts.

== List of Boulder Strip casinos ==
The Nevada Gaming Commission has stretched the definition of the Boulder Strip so that includes not just the Boulder Hwy., but all of the casinos in the city of Henderson. The following list includes gaming licenses for the Boulder Strip and the area of the casino. Since the 32 casinos include many small casinos, often equipped only with slot machines, this list is limited to casinos with gaming areas greater than 10,000 sq ft (930 m^{2}). The casinos with gaming revenue over $72 M in fiscal year 2008 are noted.

Boulder Strip Casinos Over 10,000 sq ft (930 m^{2}).
Location #	Name	Area	Revenue >$72M
27038-01	Green Valley Ranch Resort & Spa	133,659	Yes
16690-01	Sunset Station	133,409	
03274-02	Sam's Town Hotel and Gambling Hall, Las Vegas	126,681	
17503-01	Boulder Station	89,443	
19166-03	Fiesta Henderson	73,450	No
16017-03	Arizona Charlie's Boulder	47,541	
01018-07	Jokers Wild Casino	23,698	
00210-01?	Montelago at Lake Las Vegas	22,000	
00780-04?	Eldorado Casino	17,756	
15322-04?	Hacienda Hotel and Casino	17,275	
03659-03	Eastside Cannery Hotel and Casino (Note: The Eastside Cannery Hotel and Casino had not opened up its new building by this time. The casino has now been expanded to 65,000 square feet (6,000 m^{2}).)	15,000	
00004-07	Railroad Pass Hotel and Casino	12,803	
16327-05	Club Fortune Casino	11,250	

Notes

The total revenue (gaming and non-gaming) for the 32 casinos was $1.248 billion. Individual revenues for casinos is difficult to know with certainty since many companies are private and do not report revenue, or they are public, but only report revenue for groups of casinos. From the NGC abstract we know that the top eight casinos collectively took in between $858 million and $1147 million with an individual minimum of $37 million. From the square footage of the casino floor, number of machines and gaming tables, general quality of the resort and an SEC report that said that Arizona Charlie's Boulder took in $48m in revenue in one year, one can assume that the top eight are the first eight in the above list.

Green Valley Ranch, Sunset Station, Boulder Station, and Sam's Town are the four largest casinos with roughly 2,500 slot machines apiece. Casino Montelago at Lake Las Vegas caters to tourists at the upscale resorts in Lake Las Vegas. Fiesta Henderson and Arizona Charlie's Boulder are the next in size. Eastside Cannery was under construction during the time period of the report (July 1, 2007 - June 30, 2008) so their revenue numbers represented the Nevada Palace, an older casino on the site. Joker's Wild and Eldorado Casino are both owned by Boyd gaming, and Joker's Wild is slightly larger with 30 more slot machines and a poker room.

For the first 11 months of the last fiscal year gaming revenue is down 9.32% vs. 13.9% for Clark County as a whole partly because the Eastside Cannery Resort opened this fiscal year.

There are less than 3,000 rooms associated with all of these casinos so that non-gaming revenue consists of mostly food and beverages plus lease fees to secondary businesses like bowling alleys. The five largest of these casinos have a cinema attached to the complex leaving only the aging Cinedome Henderson which opened in 1993 as the only free standing first run cinema in Henderson.
