= Hotspur Resorts =

Hotspur Resorts is a wholly owned US subsidiary of Canada's Larco Hospitality (LH). Larco Hospitality was formed in 1998 to manage a hotel portfolio owned by Larco Investments Ltd., and two additional hotels owned by other investment groups. The Vancouver Airport Marriott, Larco Hospitality's first JW Marriott Resort property, opened in June 1998.

== History ==
In June 1999, Larco Hospitality opened the Hilton Vancouver Airport, described as Hilton Hotels Corporation's first franchised hotel in Canada. That year, Larco also acquired Toronto's SkyDome Hotel, which subsequently operated as the Renaissance Toronto Hotel at SkyDome.

In November 2001, Hotspur Nevada Resorts acquired the 548-room Regent Las Vegas, later renamed the JW Marriott Las Vegas Resort and Spa. The acquisition followed an approximately $80 million purchase agreement approved during the property's bankruptcy proceedings. Larco's U.S. subsidiary began providing management and advisory in December 2001.

Larco Hospitality's Canadian portfolio also included the Toronto Marriott Bloor Yorkville and the former Renaissance Toronto Airport Hotel, later operated under the Sheraton brand. In 2005, the company was involved in an Ontario Court of Appeal case concerning employment law jurisdiction.

Larco Hospitality is the largest full-service Franchise Hotel Management Company in Canada for Marriott International.
