= Gene Segerblom =

American politician

Member of the Nevada Assembly
- In office 1992–2000

Personal details
- Born: Genevieve Wines; March 15, 1918 Ruby Valley, Nevada, U.S.
- Died: January 4, 2013 (aged 94) Boulder City, Nevada, U.S.
- Spouse: Cliff Segerblom (m. 1941; died 1990)
- Children: 2, including Tick Segerblom
- Education: University of Nevada, Reno (BA)

Genevieve Segerblom (née Wines; March 15, 1918 – January 4, 2013) was an American politician who served as a member of the Nevada Assembly from 1992 to 2000.

== Early life and education ==
Segerblom was born in Ruby Valley, Nevada. She earned a Bachelor of Arts degree from the University of Nevada, Reno.

== Career ==
Segerblom worked as a teacher in Nevada. The Segerblom family were heavily involved in Nevada politics and can be traced back between 1906 and 1914 when they were first involved. Segerblom later served as a member of the Boulder City Council.

== Personal life ==
Genevieve Segerblom married photographer Cliff Segerblom in 1941. They had a daughter and son, Robin and Tick. Segerblom died, aged 94, in Boulder City, Nevada.
