= James B. Gibson =

American politician

- Gibson at 152nd Airlift Wing in 2022

Chair of the Clark County Commission
- Incumbent
- Assumed office January 4, 2022
- Preceded by: Marilyn Kirkpatrick

Vice Chair of the Clark County Commission
- In office January 4, 2021 – January 4, 2022
- Preceded by: Lawrence Weekly
- Succeeded by: Justin Jones

Member of the Clark County Commission from District G
- Incumbent
- Assumed office June 30, 2017
- Appointed by: Brian Sandoval
- Preceded by: Mary Beth Scow

11th Mayor of Henderson
- In office 1997–2009
- Preceded by: Robert A. Groesbeck
- Succeeded by: Andy Hafen

Personal details
- Born: James Brinley Gibson; May 5, 1948 (age 78) Las Vegas, Nevada, U.S.
- Party: Democratic (1986–present)
- Education: Brigham Young University; California Western School of Law

James Brinley Gibson (born May 5, 1948) is an American attorney and politician. He was the 11th mayor of Henderson, Nevada from 1997 to 2009 and is currently Clark County Commissioner since 2017. He is a member of the Democratic Party.

== Biography ==
Gibson was born in Las Vegas, Nevada, the son of James Isaac Gibson and Audrey Brinley. He attended Brigham Young University and California Western School of Law.

Gibson was elected as mayor of Henderson in May 1997 and was re-elected for his third term in 2005. He ran for the Democratic nomination for the 2006 gubernatorial election, but lost in the primary to State Senator (now U.S. Representative) Dina Titus.

In April 2008, Gibson became an Area Seventy in the Church of Jesus Christ of Latter-day Saints. He previously served as president of the Henderson Nevada Lake Mead Stake of the church.

== Awards and honors ==
Throughout his career, Gibson has received several awards and honors including the Henderson Chamber of Commerce Outstanding Member Award and the Humanitarian Award from the National Jewish Medical and Research Center. In 2007, Gibson received the Nevada State College President's Medal and the Clark County School District Crystal Apple Award. The Henderson Development Association and the City of Henderson named his as their O'Callaghan Public Sector Person of the Year in 2008 from and the Clark County Commercial Managers Group awarded him its 2009 Vision Award.

== Clark County Commissioner ==
Gibson was appointed by Republican Nevada Governor Brian Sandoval for the position of Clark County Commissioner on June 30, 2017, replacing Mary Beth Scow for the seat. He ran for a full term in 2018 and was easily elected with 55.7% of the vote against Republican nominee Cindy Lake, who got 41.9%. He was re-elected in 2022 with 53.5% of the vote.

== See also ==
- List of mayors of Henderson, Nevada

Political offices
Preceded by Robert A. Groesbeck	Mayor of Henderson; 1997–2009	Succeeded by Andy Hafen
Preceded by Mary Beth Scow	Member of the Clark County Commission from District G 2017–present	Incumbent
Preceded by Lawrence Weekly	Vice Chair of the Clark County Commission; 2021–2022	Succeeded by Justin Jones
Preceded by Marilyn Kirkpatrick	Chair of the Clark County Commission; 2022–present	Incumbent
