= Clark County Regional Flood Control District =

Government agency in southern Nevada flooding

The Clark County Regional Flood Control District (CCRFCD) was created in 1985 by the Nevada Legislature allowing Clark County to provide broad solutions to flooding problems. The District has developed plans and so far continued working on a 50-year program to eliminate most flooding from a 100-year flood in the populated areas for which the CCRFCD is responsible.

== History ==
Voters in 1986 approved a quarter cent sales tax to fund construction of regional flood control facilities. The first project began in 1988. As of June 2013, a total of $1.7 bill was spent on flood control, including construction of 90 detention basins and approximately 581 miles of channels and underground storm drains. To date, 51 square miles have been removed from federally identified FEMA flood zones, saving residents millions of dollars per year in flood insurance premiums.

The Regional Flood Control District is more than 75 percent complete with the Master Plan. Another 31 detention basins are planned, along with 226 miles of conveyance.

Since Las Vegas is located in a basin with a single outlet, the Las Vegas Wash, all rain runoff drains to the east side of the basin where it will eventually be deposited into Lake Mead. Rainfall in the surrounding mountain ranges, can cause flooding in the area as water flows off the mountains onto the valley floor. The area is also subject to localized weather events. It is possible for an area to receive heavy rainfall in a short time, while nearby areas as close as one or two miles (2-3 km) away receive little or no rain. about past flood events is available as well as some .

The increase of hardscape as the valley has developed has contributed to an increase of runoff over time.

To help alleviate the damage caused by flooding, the Clark County Regional Flood Control District has spent millions of dollars to build detention basins and concrete drainage channels throughout the area. The belief is that these structures will control the flow of water when there is storm runoff and reduce flooding in areas below the basins and near the channels and washes.

The detention basins operated by the district vary in size from 10 to 50 acres (4.0 to 20.2 ha) and are up to 50 feet (15 m) deep.

== Incidents ==
Heavy rainfall can cause localized flash flooding. A thunderstorm hit the northwest part of the city of Las Vegas for two hours in August 2003, causing some hail damage and considerable water damage. Heavy localized flooding occurred, with property damage reaching into the hundreds of thousands of dollars. In February 2005, the southwest part of the Vegas Valley was hard hit by flooding from the mountain rainfall runoff. Higher than average precipitation that same winter was responsible for significant damage in Mesquite and Overton which, as of that point in time, had not received much attention since their populations were so much smaller than the Las Vegas valley area.

== Event detection and notification ==
The District operates a Flood Threat Recognition System of ALERT rain and stream gage, with the cooperation of the United States Geological Survey and the National Weather Service. This system collects hydrometeorological data primarily for the purpose of detecting situations which could cause flooding.

== Major facilities ==
=== Detention basins ===
- Angel Park Detention Basin
- Anthem Detention Basin
- Black Mountain Detention Basin
- Caballo Basin
- Horse Diamond Basin
- Cheyenne Peaking Basin
- Confluence Detention Basin
- Desert Inn Detention Basin
- East C-1 Detention Basin
- Equestrian Detention Basin
- Fort Apache Detention Basin
- Gowan Central Detention Basin
- Gowan South Detention Basin
- Indian Springs Detention Basin
- Kyle Canyon Detention Basin
- The Lakes Detention Basin
- Lone Mountain Detention Basin
- Lower Blue Diamond Detention Basin
- Lower Duck Creek Detention Basin
- McCullough Hills Detention Basin
- Meadows Detention Basin
- Mission Hills Detention Basin
- Oakey Detention Basin
- Pioneer Detention Basin
- Pittman East Detention Basin
- Pittman Park Detention Basin
- Red Rock Detention Basin
- R-4 Detention Basin
- Tropicana Wash Detention Basin
- Upper Flamingo Detention Basin
- Van Buskirk Detention Basin
- Vandenberg Detention Basin
- Veterans Detention Basin
- Windmill Wash Detention Basin
- Upper Duck Creek Detention Basin

=== Flood channels ===
- Beltway Channel
- Duck Creek Wash
- Flamingo Wash
- Halfway Wash
- Las Vegas Wash
- Naples Channel
- Pittman Wash
- Sloan Channel
- Tropicana Wash

== See also ==
- Surface-water hydrology
