= Las Vegas Valley Water District =

Government non-profit water supply agency

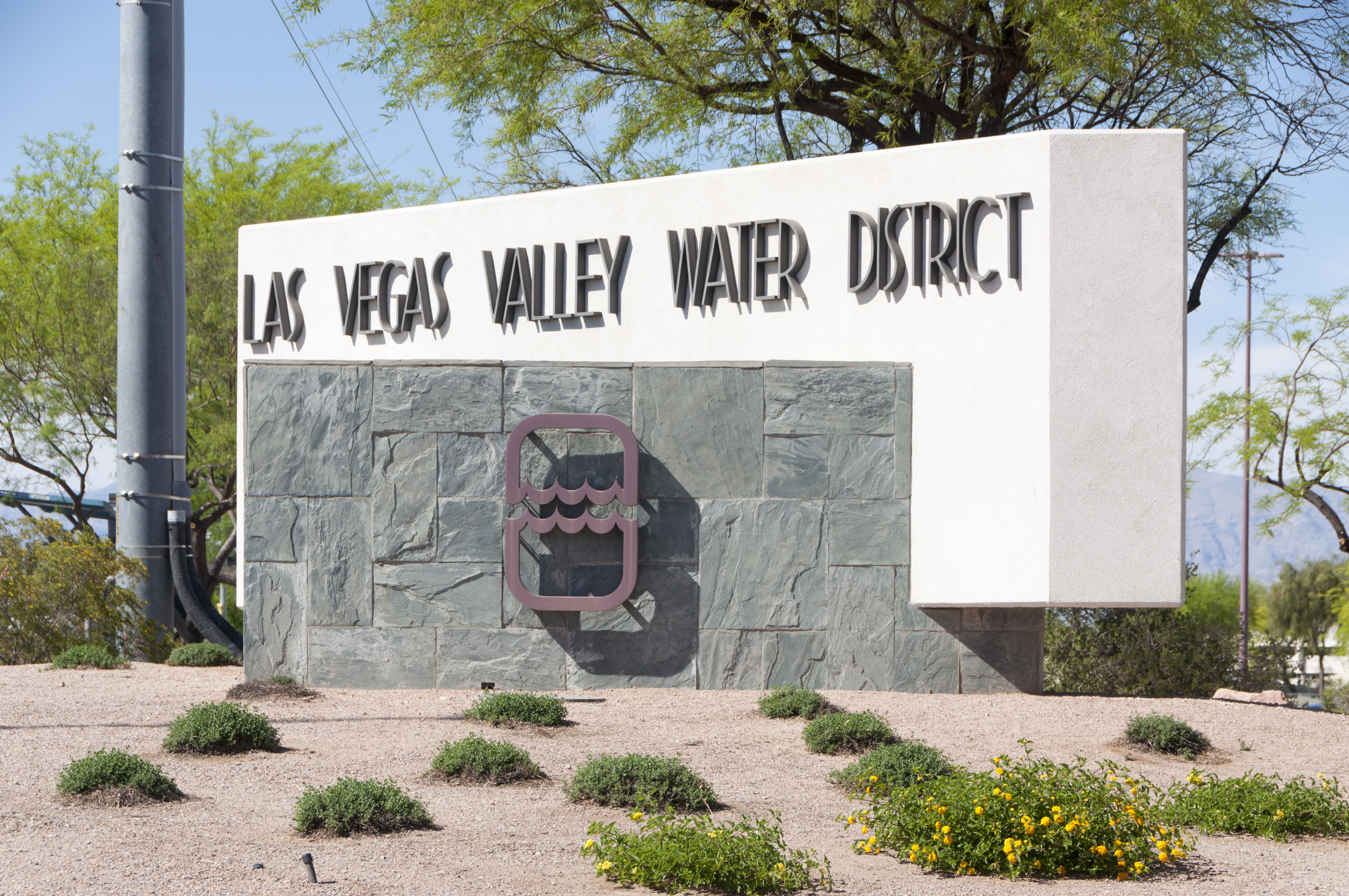
The sign outside the Las Vegas Valley Water District

The Las Vegas Valley Water District (LVVWD) is a not-for-profit government water supply agency that has been providing water to the Las Vegas Valley since 1954. The district helped build the area's water delivery system and now provides water to more than one million people in Southern Nevada. Today the District provides water to the City of Las Vegas, the unincorporated areas of Clark County including Paradise and Winchester, where the major Las Vegas Strip casinos are located, Kyle Canyon, Blue Diamond, Searchlight, and Jean.

The Clark County Commissioners serve as the Water District's board of directors. The board appoints the general manager, who carries out day-to-day activities.

District water rates are regulated by law and can cover only the costs of water delivery and the maintenance and building of facilities. Rates also are structured to encourage conservation with rates increasing with usage.

The Water District is a member agency of the Southern Nevada Water Authority, (SNWA), a regional organization that works to secure water resources for the valley. SNWA also provides conservation programs for customers of member agencies.

The district also is steward to the Las Vegas Springs Preserve, the historical home of Las Vegas' founding springs. The district is a partner in developing the preserve into a cultural resource center, featuring exhibits, trails, gardens and more.

== History ==
In the early 1900s, Las Vegas was a hub for the San Pedro, Los Angeles and Salt Lake City Railroad, which later became part of the Union Pacific Railroad. The company formed the Las Vegas Land and Water Company (LVL&W) in 1905 to sell land and provide water to Las Vegas' growing population. At that time, water came solely from wells and the Las Vegas Springs. Hoping to curb groundwater usage, the Nevada Legislature created the Las Vegas Valley Water District in 1947 to begin using the state's Colorado River allocation. The Union Pacific Railroad agreed to sell LVL&W in 1952 and the Water District began operations on July 1, 1954.

The district's first major undertaking is one of the most important achievements in Southern Nevada's history: the district created facilities to bring water from Lake Mead to the valley. This relieved an ongoing water shortage for the city, but also helped create one of the world's most popular resort destinations and America's youngest major metropolitan area.

Over the years, the district has built more than 6,500 miles of pipeline, created a reservoir system capable of storing 900 million gallons of water and implemented a sophisticated water-quality monitoring program.
