= Tuscany Village =

Coordinates: 36°04′38″N 114°58′14″W

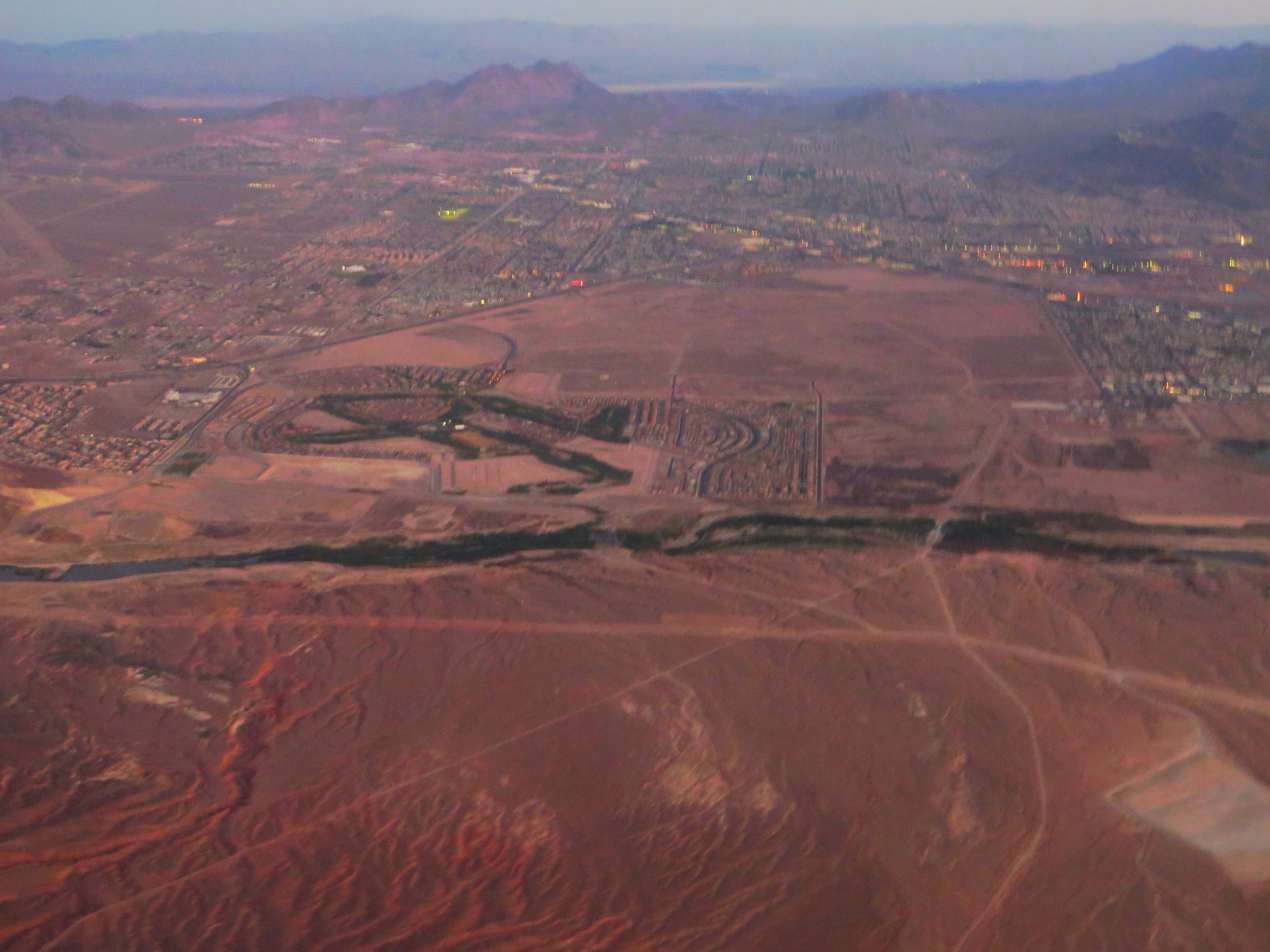
Aerial view of Tuscany, looking south (2014)

Tuscany Village is a golf course community located in Henderson, Nevada. It was originally proposed by developer Jim Rhodes in 1995, under the name Palm City. The project was proposed for the former site of the Stewart gravel pit. The surrounding area initially sparked concern about the suitability of the location, due to various environmental issues at the time. The site was located near sewage ponds and a longtime manufacturer of chemicals that had contaminated the land. Groundwater was also found to have high radioactive levels.

Rhodes graded the property in the late 1990s, but never began construction. His lender became insolvent and he sold the property in 2000 to Commerce Associates, which renamed the project Tuscany Hills. The property and surrounding acreage were designated by Henderson as a redevelopment area, making the project eligible for city funding.

After various delays, the Tuscany Golf Club opened in 2003. It is 150 acres (61 hectares) and was designed by Ted Robinson. Rhodes subsequently took back ownership of the course and the undeveloped residential land. Home construction was underway in 2005. Rhodes filed for Chapter 11 bankruptcy four years later, and Tuscany was turned over to creditors. At the time, 700 of 2,000 planned homes had been built. Ownership changed several more times, and the golf course was renamed Chimera Golf Club in 2015.

== History ==
=== Original plans ===
The project was originally proposed by developer Jim Rhodes in 1995, under the name Palm City. It was initially planned as an age-restricted community with 2,600 homes. As years went by, the unbuilt project was redesigned as an all-ages community, and was downsized to 2,200 homes. Plans for a three-acre (1.2-hectare) commercial building site were also scrapped. Added to the plans were a 10-acre (4.0-hectare) elementary school, two parks, and trails and bike lanes. Palm City was meant as an affordable version of Rhodes Ranch, another community in the Las Vegas Valley. Like Rhodes Ranch, it would also include a golf course designed by Ted Robinson. Rhodes received approval from the city of Henderson in 1998 and began grading the property that year. The site included the Stewart gravel pit, which had been abandoned since the 1980s. The former gravel mine accounted for a majority of the land of the future community.

Most residents in the area initially approved of Palm City. However, the site for Palm City was located near sewage ponds and a longtime manufacturer of chemicals which had contaminated the land. Ground water was also found to have high radioactive levels, although Rhodes Design and Development Corporation planned to proceed with the project, as local officials had yet to declare a health concern. Residents became worried about the presence of chemicals, and also become concerned about the size of the Palm City project and the increased traffic that it would bring to the area. Another possible issue was that ground water would rise to the surface and flood yards in the future community. In addition, state and local environmental officials said there was the possibility that the Las Vegas Valley's water supply would become contaminated if Rhodes was not careful. Palm City would be developed adjacent to the Las Vegas Wash, and officials stated that Rhodes would need a plan to prevent contaminated water from entering the wash.

Meanwhile, the city had concerns about a 26-building condominium complex that Rhodes wanted to include in the community, stating that his 13-acre (5.3-hectare) site was not large enough to support the project. In 1999, a contractor on the project sued Rhodes, claiming that he refused to pay $150,000 for underground utility work. This came after the contractor filed a lien on the project. In 2000, Rhodes Homes sold the undeveloped Palm City land in a $30 million deal, after its lender became insolvent. The 521-acre (211-hectare) site had been graded, but construction had yet to begin.

=== Tuscany ===
Commerce Associates, the new owner, renamed the project Tuscany Hills. The project was approved by the Henderson Planning Commission in 2001. An 18-hole golf course was scheduled to open to the public in 2002, to be followed later in the year by completion of homes. The city also designated the site as a redevelopment area, making it eligible for city funding. Tuscany was expected to provide $263 million in new tax revenue for Henderson over a period of 30 years. Aside from Tuscany's 525 acres (212 hectares), the redevelopment area also included 325 surrounding acres (132 surrounding hectares), for a total of 850 (340). The redevelopment deal created controversy over city ethics, as two minority owners in Commerce Associates also sat on the Henderson Redevelopment Advisory Commission, and they resigned only weeks prior to the deal.

In June 2002, a majority stakeholder in Commerce Associates sued his business partner in the company, claiming that he diverted millions of dollars from the company for his own uses. A month later, Henderson mortgage executive Tom Hantges filed a civil lawsuit alleging that the redevelopment agency broke state laws. The Tuscany project had been approved for redevelopment funds because a portion of the property was classified as an abandoned mine. However, aerial photographs showed that little had remained of the gravel pit, as Rhodes had cleared most of it out. City officials stated that the site still qualified as a blight. Henderson mayor James B. Gibson said, "It has to be a priority of the city to reclaim that land and a lot of the surrounding land and it's no easy task given the industrial uses that were prevalent on much of that area."

Managing partners at Commerce Associates stated that Hantges' lawsuit was part of an effort to force a settlement in an unrelated racketeering suit that the company had filed against him. The city requested that the suit be dismissed, and a district judge later ruled against Hantges, stating that his lawsuit was filed nearly a year after a 90-day deadline for such action. Hantges had also been concerned about a conflict of interest regarding the redevelopment agency, although the Supreme Court of Nevada ruled against him as well, stating that there was no such issue beause the board members recused themselves from discussions and voting.

Golf club sign

Tuscany entrance

The United States Environmental Protection Agency evaluated nearly 400 acres (160 hectares) of evaporation ponds, located west of Tuscany. The agency concluded that there was no risk posed by the former ponds, which had previously been used to dispose of chemical wastewater. However, there was concern about a nearby Good Humor-Breyers ice cream factory, which used ammonia as a coolant. More than 99,000 pounds (45,000 kg) of the chemical were stored at the facility. In the event of an accidental ammonia leak, a toxic plume would extend up to 2,300 feet (700 m), well within range of Tuscany. Studies were taken in 2003 to determine whether the Tuscany plans would need to be altered to avoid a health hazard. City officials said they had not previously considered conducting such studies. Because the site used to be a gravel pit, much of Tuscany was built at least 40 feet (12 m) below street level, a fact that would work in favor of the community in the event of an ammonia leak, as the chemical would rise into the air. A final report in 2003 found that Tuscany would not need to be altered because of the ammonia threat, allowing the project to proceed.

The Tuscany golf course contains 150 acres (61 hectares). Because of a lack of surrounding infrastructure, the developers had to bring in water and sewer lines. The course had been completed in early 2002, but it sat unused for more than a year as the opening was delayed by the lawsuits, as well as permit problems. The slow construction of roads and parking lots was another factor. The golf course eventually opened in 2003, and is the centerpiece of the community. It was designed to resemble an Italian vineyard. Home construction had yet to begin at that time.

In 2004, Jim Rhodes purchased the Tuscany Golf Club from Commerce Associates. He closed it for renovations to restore the previous design intended by Robinson. It reopened later that year. Rhodes Homes also took over the residential aspect, now known as Tuscany Village. Construction of homes was underway in 2005, and the community opened that year. There were 168 homes built by 2006. The architecture of the community is based on the Italian region of Tuscany. The golf course was praised. As of 2007, the facility hosted 46,000 rounds of golf annually, and it was named by Golf Magazine as the number-one course in Las Vegas.

Homes at Tuscany

In 2009, Jim Rhodes filed for Chapter 11 bankruptcy and agreed to turn over Tuscany to his creditors. Residents of Tuscany welcomed the news of Rhodes' departure, as they felt that he had mismanaged the community homeowner association (HOA). In recent years, the HOA had seen frequent changes in its board presidents and community managers, and residents alleged that community upkeep had been neglected. Empty home lots were also spread throughout Tuscany. Only 700 of 2,000 homes had been built in the community up to that point. Creditors led by Credit Suisse were owed $370 million, and they took over control of Tuscany in January 2010. Dunhill Homes, a newly formed company in Dallas, was named later that year to manage and further develop Tuscany. In 2014, Century Communities purchased Dunhill Homes and acquired Tuscany Village.

In 2015, the golf club was sold to two golfers who renamed it as Chimera Golf Club. They also made various improvements and reopened an outdoor bar and grill. At the time, Century Communities had approximately 450 vacant home lots left to develop at Tuscany Village, with residential construction expected to continue into 2019. Some home lots were developed by Lennar.
