= Blue Diamond Hill housing proposals =

Proposed development in Nevada

Coordinates: 36.085287°N 115.403114°W

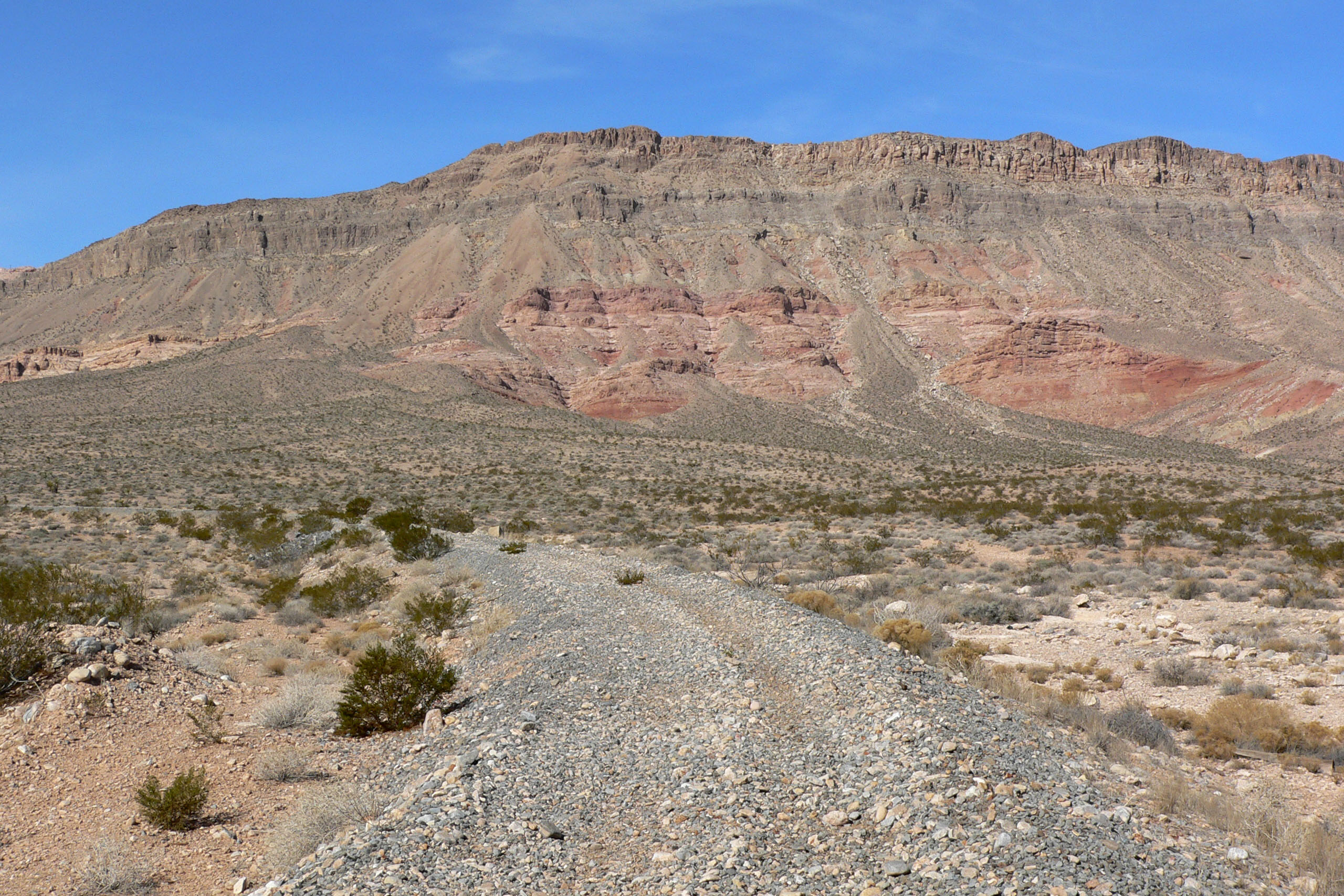
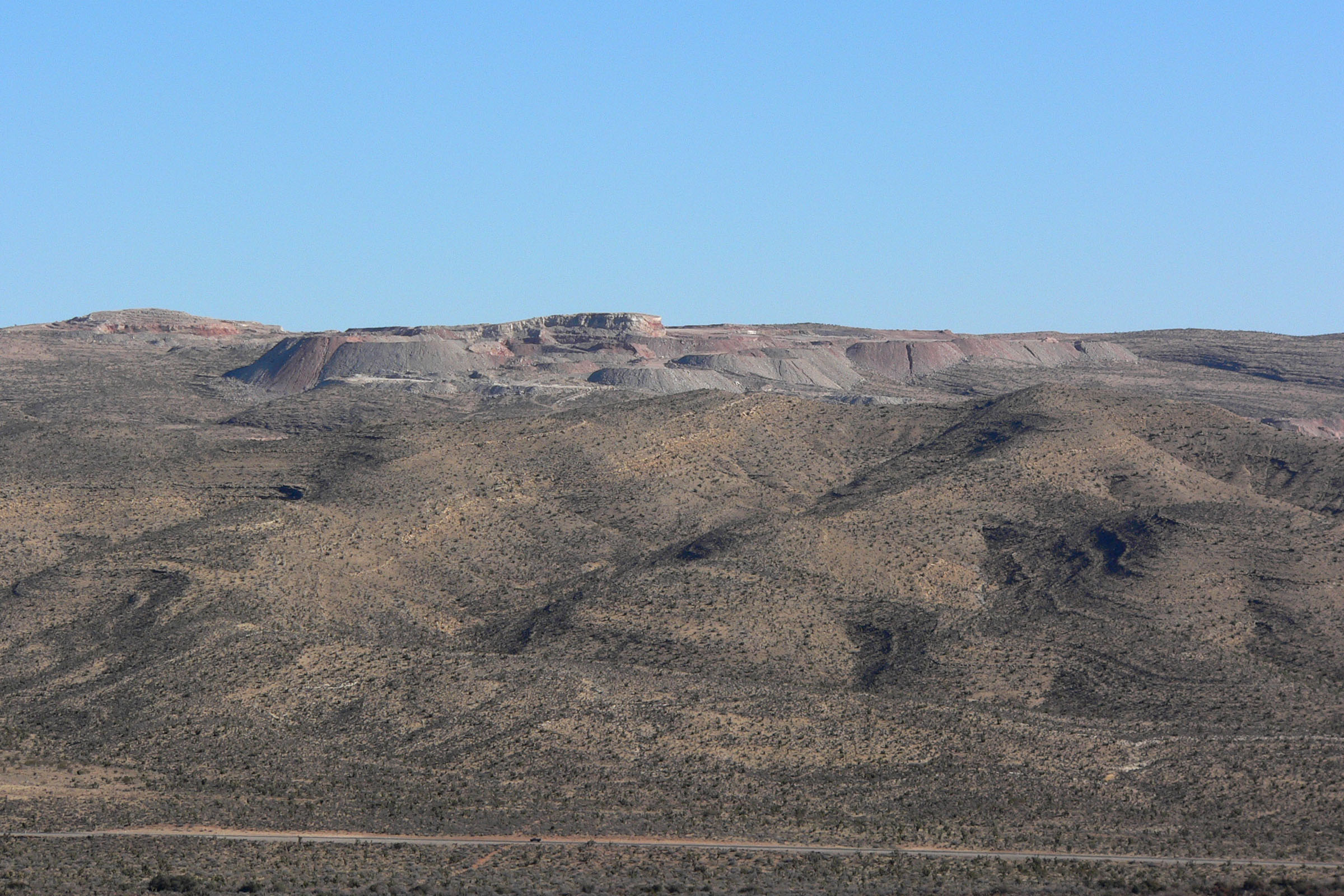
Blue Diamond Hill in the mid-2000s

Since 2002, there have been various housing proposals for Blue Diamond Hill, located in rural Clark County, Nevada. The proposed site is located west of Las Vegas, near the Red Rock Canyon National Conservation Area. The Blue Diamond Mine has operated on the land since the 1920s, but the property otherwise remains vacant. Each of the proposed housing projects have received some opposition from environmentalists, citing concerns about the impact that such a project would have on the surrounding area.

In 2002, John Laing Homes proposed a community known as Cielo Encantado, with more than 8,400 homes on nearly 3,000 acres. Some residents of nearby Blue Diamond, Nevada were opposed to the project, which would bring 21,000 new residents to the area. By comparison, the town of Blue Diamond had 300 residents. Opponents also argued that a residential development would have a negative impact on the nearby Red Rock Canyon. After much opposition, John Laing withdrew its proposal in 2002.

Within a few months, developer Jim Rhodes purchased 2,400 acres on Blue Diamond Hill and announced plans for Hidden Hills, a proposed community with up to 5,500 homes. This property is located near Red Rock Canyon, but not inside it. State senator Dina Titus introduced a bill to freeze the rural residential zoning that had already been in place at allowed one house for every two acres. Titus' bill was signed into law in May 2003, and the Clark County Commission passed a similar ordinance two days later. Rhodes filed a lawsuit in 2005, to overturn the law and ordinance. In 2009, a federal judge ruled in Rhodes' favor. The Clark County Commission subsequently approved a settlement deal with Rhodes that would allow development on the land, under certain conditions.

In 2011, Rhodes proposed an unnamed community that would have 7,000 homes. The proposal received some opposition, and Rhodes later agreed to swap his land for other acreage, allowing for the preservation of Blue Diamond Hill. However, discussions with the Bureau of Land Management (BLM) ended in 2014, without a swap deal. The BLM did not swap for Rhodes' property because it felt it had been disrupted by the mining operation. In 2016, Rhodes proposed another unnamed community that would have 5,025 homes. This proposal also received some opposition, leading to several lawsuits. The number of homes was later reduced to 3,500. The project remains unbuilt, although Rhodes still intends to proceed with development. His company, Gypsum Resources, was approved in October 2022 to build 429 homes across 671 acres.

== Background ==
The Blue Diamond Mine has operated on the land since the 1920s. Gypsum has been mined at the site, which is known as Blue Diamond Hill and is located west of Las Vegas. Blue Diamond Hill is located near the eastern edge, but not inside, of the Red Rock Canyon National Conservation Area, near the community of Blue Diamond, Nevada. In 1999, mine owner James Hardie Gypsum put 2,700 acres of mine land up for sale, at a price of $45 million.

== History ==
=== Cielo Encantado ===
In July 2001, James Hardie Gypsum announced that it would sell 2,200 acres of mined mountain land to John Laing Homes for approximately $50 million. John Laing planned a housing community for the area, which lacked power and sufficient water for any major development. Any project on the land would require approval from the Clark County Commission and the Las Vegas Valley Water District, and John Laing would likely need to get approval from the Bureau of Land Management (BLM) to build roads and get power to the future community. The finalization of the sale was dependent on planning and regulatory approval for the future project.

Environmentalists, as well as residents of Blue Diamond, had previously opposed development of the mountainous region, and they had concerns about John Laing's future plans for the site. Opponents were worried about the land near Red Rock Canyon becoming an area of urban development. They were also concerned that a housing project with thousands of homes would affect the native Blue Diamond Cholla cactus. In addition, there were concerns that houses would negatively affect the view from Red Rock Canyon. John Laing planned to set aside 100 acres to preserve the view, and another 80 acres to protect rare plant life.

Details about the housing project were unveiled in July 2002. The project would be known as Cielo Encantado, Spanish for "enchanted sky". It would include more than 8,400 houses and would bring an estimated 21,000 new residents to the area. By comparison, the town of Blue Diamond had only 300 residents. The two communities would be a mile apart from each other. The Red Rock Citizens Advisory Council had concerns about how fast the project was progressing. The council advises the Clark County Commission on land issues regarding Blue Diamond, Red Rock Canyon, and other nearby areas. The project was expected to face a years-long process before final approval. This included rezoning the rural area, which, at the time, only allowed a home for every two acres. The project was also dependent on whether the BLM would approve a 979-acre land swap, which would give John Laing a total of nearly 3,000 acres for Cielo Encantado. Such a decision was at least a year away. John Laing needed the land to form a contiguous property for the new community, but said that it would proceed with the project regardless, simply reducing the size in the event of rejection from the BLM.

John Laing hoped to have some homes on the property as soon as 2004. Approximately $100 million would be spent on water, sewers, and roads, including a four-lane highway. Home prices would range from $250,000 to $10 million, and the new community was expected to bring in a $1.7 billion profit. The project was designed by Quadrant Planning to have a minimal impact on the environment and nearby residents. This would include constructing the four-lane highway at the east side of the hill, away from the existing Blue Diamond community. Most of the housing project would be located in a mined-out valley located on top of Blue Diamond Hill, keeping it hidden from people visiting Red Rock Canyon. However, county planning staff members and the Red Rock Citizens Advisory Council were skeptical that the impact of the new community could be mitigated entirely. The developers stated that a residential project would be a better use of the land than continued gypsum mining. Some opponents were concerned that increased traffic from the project would result in more fatalities to wild horses and burros in the area.

In mid-August 2002, executives of John Laing and Quadrant Planning hosted a meeting with approximately 130 people, mostly Blue Diamond residents, to discuss the proposed community. Attendees expressed their concern about the project and its potential effects on the surrounding area, including recreational activities at Red Rock Canyon. Also questioned was the availability of services such as water, police, and firefighters. In addition, G.C. Wallace, an engineering firm, was working on the project while simultaneously conducting a feasibility study on the proposed land swap with the BLM. Residents complained that G.C. Wallace had a conflict of interest, although the BLM determined that there was no such issue. State senator Dina Titus was among those who attended the meeting. Years earlier, she had proposed the establishment of a boundary around the Las Vegas Valley that would prevent development from occurring outside the boundary, and she considered reviving the proposal in response to the Cielo Encantado project. In the event that the project were green lit, the final approval was not expected until at least March 2003, and the project was expected to take a decade before being fully built out.

The Clark County planning staff recommended rejection of the project on August 20, 2002, expressing skepticism that John Laing could keep the nearby Red Rock Canyon in pristine condition. A week later, the Red Rock Citizens Advisory Council unanimously recommended denial of Cielo Encantado. Clark County commissioners were also reluctant to approve the project, and the Sierra Club had joined the list of opponents to the project. During a zoning meeting in early September 2002, John Laing requested that the county Planning Commission delay consideration of the project for two to four weeks. This would give the company time to respond to concerns from Blue Diamond residents. In addition, the company stated that political elections were having a negative impact on the project, as commissioners were reluctant to approve the project while simultaneously seeking re-election or higher office. Approximately 150 protesters arrived at the meeting, demanding that the Planning Commission vote rather than delay consideration of the project. Officers of the Las Vegas Metropolitan Police Department were eventually called to the meeting to disperse the protesters. No arrests were made.

A few days after the meeting, opponents held a protest rally at Red Rock Canyon, where they gathered signatures against Cielo Encantado. More than 4,000 people signed the petition, and Clark County commissioner Dario Herrera proposed a county law that would make it more difficult for projects like Cielo Encantado to get approved. The proposed law would include buffer zones for certain areas where such projects would face tougher scrutiny from the county. On September 30, 2002, as a result of the opposition, John Laing withdrew the project from further county consideration, with the possibility of presenting the same or similar proposal in the future.

=== Preservation proposals ===
Although John Laing had withdrawn its project, a number of other developers had become interested in developing the land, and further proposals were expected to be made in the future. Among the prospective buyers was Rhodes Homes, owned by developer Jim Rhodes. The county considered adding the mine to the Red Rock Overlay District, which would restrict the size and design of any development on Blue Diamond Hill. The changes were devised by a group that was formed by Herrera.

The county also proposed that the property be purchased by the federal government and be declared part of Red Rock Canyon, preventing development of the land. The county nominated the property for purchase by the BLM. However, a BLM spokesperson said, "We are very, very hesitant. The problem is reclamation. We've got a lot of mined-out land up there and it would be very expensive to reclaim. Who knows how much it would cost?"

Another proposal came from The Conservation Fund in January 2003. The organization had proposed buying a conservation easement for the area, which would allow James Hardie to retain ownership and continue mining, while also permanently blocking any development of the land. The easement would ideally be sold to the county or the BLM. James Hardie rejected the proposal, with a company attorney stating that The Conservation Fund appeared to be "misrepresenting James Hardie's position to the Bureau of Land Management and to others..."

Jim Rhodes enlisted the help of former commissioner Erin Kenny, a longtime ally, to lobby on his behalf, after her term ended in January 2003. Kenny was replaced by commissioner Mark James. Despite a one-year ban on lobbying, Kenny repeatedly contacted James in an alleged effort to influence him towards Rhodes' favor. However, the ban carried no penalty for violators. Kenny denied that she had broken the policy. In February 2003, Titus announced that she was working on a bill to freeze the rural residential zoning near Red Rock Canyon. Titus' bill would remove the ability of the Clark County Commission to modify or ignore development guidelines for the area. The bill was partly in response to concerns that the Clark County Commission had overwhelmingly approved large projects despite opposition. Some commissioners were opposed to Titus' idea, believing that the matter should be handled locally. Rhodes' attorney, who was critical of the bill, later said, "It targets a single land owner, it usurps local government jurisdiction, it prevents due process, and it disregards the rights of property owners."

As of March 2003, the overlay proposal was stalled in Clark County. James stated that Jim Rhodes and James Hardie Gypsum should have been included in the overlay discussions, which had previously excluded the two. Red Rock supporters were opposed to James' decision to include Rhodes in discussions. There were concerns from opponents that Rhodes would be grandfathered in and allowed to develop the land by the time that the overlay got passed. Meanwhile, Titus' bill moved forward in the Nevada Legislature. The bill would block high-density residential development on Blue Diamond Hill, keeping the site limited to one house for every two acres. Gypsum mining would also be allowed to continue.

James and another commissioner, Chip Maxfield, did not consider Titus' bill to be the best solution; she said her bill was in response to a lack of action locally. In the event that her bill were defeated, Titus planned to introduce it as a popular referendum in Clark County, letting voters there determine whether large-scale development should take place. Titus was confident that the referendum would pass, saying, "It's not a Blue Diamond issue. It's a Red Rock issue. We've got support from all over the place." Most members of the Clark County Commission eventually offered support for Titus' bill, with the exception of James: "Anytime the Legislature decides they have a particular concern about any area in any one of our districts, they just pass a law. I think that sets a dangerous precedent." Titus suggested that James had a close relationship with Rhodes, who had contributed $5,000 to James' 2002 commissioner campaign. James had also previously lived in a rented mansion owned by Rhodes. Three other commissioners also had close ties to Rhodes.

On March 21, 2003, Rhodes purchased 2,400 acres on Blue Diamond Hill for $50 million through a company known as Gypsum Resources. He said he had no specific plans for the land, other than the continuation of gypsum mining. Rhodes requested the Nevada Senate Committee on Governmental Affairs to reject Titus' proposal. He suggested that housing on Blue Diamond Hill could be better for the area than mining: "This land has been mined for more than 80 years, and there remains a 20-year supply left on the mountain. Unfortunately, those many years of mining have devastated and scarred the property. One of my main priorities will be the restoration and reclamation of this wonderful area." Titus was concerned that the Blue Diamond Cholla would go extinct unless her bill was passed. County planners and BLM officials believed that Rhodes would seek zoning for a higher density of homes to cover the $50 million cost of the land. James announced his support for Titus' bill shortly thereafter, while planning to introduce the overlay proposal as well.

In April 2003, Rhodes filed a lawsuit against James over his proposal to preserve the area around Red Rock Canyon. The lawsuit accused James of having a conflict of interest in the case. Rhodes alleged that James, who was also an attorney, had advised him on the purchase and potential rezoning of Blue Diamond Hill. Rhodes stated, "Mr. James told me he thought residential development (on the land near Red Rock) would be a benefit to the community and that he would support it. ... Mr. James recommended actions for me to take, which he predicted would result in rezoning of the property so it could be developed for residential use." Rhodes attorney said, "A lawyer who represents a client and gives advice to that client can't as a public official take a position that affects that client. If you want to talk to someone as a lawyer, you have to remain a lawyer." James denied the allegations and called the lawsuit a "desperate attempt to keep me from voting and representing my constituents". James alleged that Rhodes had offered him substantial campaign donations in exchange for support on the Blue Diamond Hill case. James and Kenny's involvement in the Blue Diamond Hill project, and their connections to Rhodes, led to the revival of the county's ethics task force.

A district judge later declined to issue an injunction against James, thereby allowing him to introduce the overlay proposal. However, the judge still allowed Rhodes' lawsuit to proceed. James subsequently sought to dismiss it, citing various reasons including allegations of a strategic lawsuit against public participation. Meanwhile, the Clark County Commission suggested that the BLM purchase Rhodes' property in order to preserve it. However, the BLM remained hesitant. On April 28, 2003, U.S. senators John Ensign and Harry Reid proposed a plan for the state to buy Rhodes' property and allow the county to perform environmental reclamation. The land would then be taken over by the BLM and declared part of Red Rock Canyon. The BLM supported the proposal, as the land reclamation would be undertaken by the county. The proposal would take at least five years to complete. However, Rhodes was not interested in selling the land, but was open to the idea of a property swap for federal land located elsewhere in southern Nevada.

=== Rhodes projects ===
==== 2003 proposal ====
On April 30, 2003, Rhodes applied for county zoning to build Hidden Hills, a proposed community for Blue Diamond Hill. He applied for approval to build up to 5,500 homes, but also applied separately for 1,500 homes that would each be built on two acres, in accordance with the area's existing master plan. Amid the efforts to preserve the land, Rhodes said the applications were necessary to secure development rights on the property before it was too late. In both cases, the applications were divided into four parcels in order to avoid the county's "major projects" review, which can take up to a year. A few days after Rhodes filed for zoning, county planners determined that Hidden Hills would have to undergo the major-projects process because of the amount of acreage, and its location far away from infrastructure such as major roads, as well as water and sewer lines. Meanwhile, the county commission approved Ensign and Reid's proposal for the state to buy Rhodes' property. Rhodes filed an appeal asking that his zoning applications be reviewed at the next commissioner meeting in two weeks, where the members would also be voting on James' overlay proposal. However, a county spokesperson said that Rhodes' request would have to wait another month before consideration.

Rhodes launched free tours of the gypsum mine for the public, to demonstrate the effects of the operation while arguing that a residential project would be better for the land. The tours ran for a week, and Rhodes also launched a television advertising campaign to argue for his project. Some people who took the tour became convinced that housing would be a better use of the property, after seeing the effects that the mining operation had on the land. Titus compared the tours to those given at Yucca Mountain: "You see what they want you to see, you hear what they want you to hear". Rhodes also launched a website and a newspaper ad campaign to convince the public. He emphasized that Hidden Hills would not be located within Red Rock Canyon, and said that it would not have an impact on the area's scenery. Opponents stated that development on Blue Diamond Hill itself was not an issue, but rather the effect that such development would have on the surrounding area. State lawmakers received hundreds of emails and phone calls from opponents and supporters of Rhodes' project following the promotional campaign. Nevada State Assembly member Chad Christensen later said that most of the comments from Rhodes' supporters were form letters, saying, "They were an obvious orchestrated effort to kill the bill. The pro ones were more heartfelt, from people with a genuine interest in Red Rock."

Rhodes organized hundreds of supporters to attend a hearing on Titus' bill, which had received signatures of support from nearly 11,000 people. The Rhodes supporters allegedly intimidated opponents and tried to restrict public comments. Titus' bill was passed and eventually signed into law by Nevada governor Kenny Guinn on May 19, 2003. James' ordinance was passed by the Clark County Commission two days later, restricting Rhodes to one home for every two acres. Rhodes would still be able to develop approximately 83 percent of his property on Blue Diamond Hill. Rhodes considered taking legal action against the ordinance.

In June 2003, Rhodes dropped his earlier lawsuit against James, given that the ordinance had already passed. Later that month, Rhodes sought approval for 96 acres on Blue Diamond Hill to be rezoned for an industrial park, in accordance with the county's master plan for the acreage. However, two commissioners were out of town and two others had to abstain because of their relationship with Rhodes. This left only three commissioners, and a 2001 state law required that at least four participate in each decision. A vote on the matter was not expected until July 2003, a day after Titus' bill would go into effect and prevent rezoning. Rhodes' initial effort to develop a community at Blue Diamond Hill did not proceed.

==== Litigation and 2010 settlement ====
In May 2005, Rhodes' company Gypsum Resources filed a state lawsuit challenging the constitutionality of Titus' bill and the Clark County ordinance. The lawsuit was filed against Governor Guinn, state attorney general Brian Sandoval, and Clark County. Rhodes filed a similar, federal lawsuit four months later to overturn the law and ordinance. Titus said that efforts to purchase the land from him were unsuccessful.

In 2009, a federal judge ruled in Rhodes' favor, declaring that state laws must apply throughout Nevada rather than specific areas. The state appealed the decision. In March 2010, after years of litigation with Rhodes, the Clark County Commission introduced a code allowing Rhodes to develop a community on approximately 1,700 acres of his 2,400-acre property. Development would not take place on the land located closest to Blue Diamond and Red Rock Canyon, and Rhodes would be prohibited from using State Route 159 for access to the community. Route 159 travels through Red Rock Canyon and is considered a scenic route. As part of the deal, 500 acres would become part of Red Rock Canyon. Rhodes and the county agreed to the compromise to avoid further court action on the matter. If the county had proceeded in court and lost, it would also lose certain control over any development project on the land. The county could also be liable for Rhodes' legal costs, potentially up to $1 million. The compromise was criticized by nearby residents, as well as conservationists. At the end of the month, residents of Blue Diamond and other areas voiced their opposition to a proposed housing community.

Rhodes' previous plans from 2003 were scrapped in favor of a new proposal that would be created with public input. Rhodes had previously planned a golf course for his proposed community, although such a feature was likely to be excluded from the new proposal, as it was not considered to be economical or environmentally friendly. The land on Blue Diamond Hill was considered ideal for wind and solar energy, which would be provided to the future community. Because the site contained underground mines, there would be geological testing to ensure that the land was stable enough for construction of a community. There was doubt that such a community would actually get built, given that the infrastructure alone could cost $30 million. In addition, Rhodes had filed for bankruptcy a year earlier, and it was believed that the housing market would take years to recover from the Great Recession. There was also concern that the project would affect the Blue Diamond cholla, listed by the state as critically endangered.

In April 2010, the Clark County Commission approved the compromise proposal, which would also allow Rhodes to apply for a higher-density of housing. Titus, now a U.S. congresswoman, had urged the commission to reject the proposed settlement, and three of the seven commissioners ultimately voted against it. Although the settlement was approved, it would be rendered null if the state prevailed in its appeal of the 2009 ruling. Shortly after the vote, Rhodes paid $490,000 in owed property taxes for the land, while disputing the county's assessing figures. The land was valued at $2,500 per acre, compared to $10,000 three years earlier. Commissioner Susan Brager worked to set up a committee of residents and environmentalists who would work with Rhodes on the future housing project.

==== 2011 proposal and failed land swap ====
In July 2011, after much input from the public, Rhodes unveiled plans for an unnamed community with 7,000 homes, as well as schools, shops, restaurants, offices, and parks. The community would be self-sustaining. Rhodes hoped to break ground in 2013, with completion potentially taking up to 30 years. Construction would take place over several phases. However, residents of Blue Diamond objected to the project, stating that it would ruin their rural lifestyle. In August 2011, despite opposition, the Clark County Commission approved an early concept plan for 4,700 homes. Rhodes hoped to add another 2,000 houses to the plans by swapping 800 acres with the BLM. The commission placed 26 conditions on the project. A few months after the commission's approval, Rhodes sought a waiver that would allow State Route 159 to be used as an access road during construction of the new community. He said that a misunderstanding had resulted in the commission's earlier restriction relating to the highway, a claim that was denied by Brager. Rhodes alleged that the access road requirement was intended to kill the project. He later withdrew his proposal to use Route 159.

In October 2011, the United States Court of Appeals for the Ninth Circuit requested that the Supreme Court of Nevada make a determination about whether Titus' 2003 bill was constitutional. In early 2012, Rhodes announced that he had resumed gypsum mining on the land, after operations there had shut down years earlier. Blue Diamond residents noted that trucks were travelling to the site, but some residents believed that Rhodes was actually preparing the land for development of housing, while getting tax breaks for a mining operation that they did not believe to be in existence. The mining operation was later confirmed to be active again. Later in 2012, creditors filed a lawsuit against Rhodes and sought to seize the land from him to recoup losses. Rhodes ultimately kept ownership of the land.

In January 2013, Brager was leading an effort for the federal government to swap Rhodes' land for a less controversial parcel. Under the proposal, Rhodes' property at Blue Diamond Hill would become part of Red Rock Canyon, a move that would help protect the endangered Blue Diamond cholla. Rhodes agreed to Brager's proposal, and she wanted it done within a year. Environmentalists praised the land swap idea, and the Clark County Commission approved it in January 2013. At the end of the month, the Supreme Court of Nevada unanimously ruled in Rhodes' favor, declaring that Titus' 2003 bill was unconstitutional. Nevertheless, Rhodes still intended to proceed with a land swap. The state agreed to pay $920,000 to cover Rhodes' legal fees.

Discussions with the BLM ended in 2014, without a deal. The agency did not want to acquire Rhodes' land because the majority of it, or 1,800 acres, had been disrupted by the mining operations.

==== 2016 proposal and lawsuits ====
The county mistakenly believed that Rhodes' 2011 approval had expired and thus instructed him to file a new plan. In August 2016, he proposed a plan for an unnamed community, mostly identical to the 2011 proposal but with several changes. The project would now include 5,025 homes. Because the site still had 10 years' worth of gypsum mining, construction of the community would take place in phases to allow mine work to continue. Construction would first begin on the southern portion of Rhodes' land, at an undetermined point later in time. The project would still include a four-lane highway, 4.7 miles long, to alleviate traffic congestion. Save Red Rock, a group that was opposed to development in the area, stated that Rhodes' concept plan could not be approved as proposed because it would violate the county's master plan and the county code. In the latter case, the group stated that a single concept plan must consist of contiguous land. Rhodes' property consisted of two large parcels. In October 2016, the county Planning Commission recommended that the Clark County Commission reject the proposal, believing that it was incompatible with the county's comprehensive plan. Save Red Rock garnered more than 5,000 signatures opposed to a zoning change.

At the end of 2016, Clark County sued Save Red Rock over its opposition to Rhodes' project. The county stated that it wanted a court to rule whether Save Red Rock's prior arguments against the 2011 proposal could be used again for the current proposal. The lawsuit also stated that the county commission did not need to go through another approval process because Rhodes' 2011 approval had not expired, although Save Red Rock disputed this claim. The organization sought a dismissal of the county lawsuit, calling it a strategic lawsuit against public participation. The organization cited concerns that the county could prevent it from testifying against the project at county commission meetings. In February 2017, a judge ruled against dismissal, as he did not believe that the county would prevent Save Red Rock from testifying. However, the judge declined to rule on whether the 2011 proposal had expired. Recent public notices had stated that the approval had expired, creating uncertainty about its true status.

Save Red Rock organized a protest against the project. The group placed billboards around the Las Vegas Valley to promote the event, which would be held at a county meeting where the project would be discussed. Save Red Rock acquired more than 45,000 signatures opposing Rhodes' project. The musical groups Imagine Dragons and The Killers were among opponents of the project. At the meeting, the Clark County Commission determined that the 2011 proposal never expired and that Rhodes therefore would not have to start the process again. Rhodes agreed to keep conditions such as the reduced number of homes, for a total of 5,025. Save Red Rock was not opposed to the current zoning, which allowed up to 1,500 homes, but the group objected to anything more. The Las Vegas Valley Water District estimated that the project would require at least 6.5 miles of pipeline, as well as three pump stations and three reservoirs.

The commission's decision sparked anger in opponents. Commissioner Steve Sisolak said, "It's unfortunate that they're not taking the time to understand what happened", stating that a housing project had not actually been approved for the site yet and that such a project would still have to acquire various approvals. After the decision, Save Red Rock asked a court to issue an injunction that would block the project from undergoing the county's planning process. Save Red Rock also questioned whether the 2011 approval was still valid.

In March 2017, the Nevada Legislature proposed a bill that would freeze zoning changes on property located within five miles of national conservation areas. The proposal was similar to Titus' 2003 bill, except that it would affect the entire state. A Gypsum Resources spokesman argued that the bill unfairly targeted Rhodes. The proposed bill was rewritten a month later to exclude zoning freezes. Instead, the bill would create standards for land located within a half-mile of conservation areas. The bill was rewritten over concerns that the original wording was too broad and would hinder development. The rewritten bill would allow Rhodes to proceed with his project, although his spokesman still believed that the bill targeted the land on Blue Diamond Hill specifically, and that it was inappropriate for the state to become involved in local government.

In May 2017, a judge dismissed four of nine counterclaims made by Save Red Rock. The claims had related to the 2016 proposal, which had since been withdrawn in favor of the 2011 proposal. The county sought to dismiss the lawsuit entirely, but a judge allowed it to proceed. In 2018, Rhodes sold 1,375 acres in mining claims to a Denver company, and reduced the number of homes for his future community to 3,500. Meanwhile, the county sought a pre-trial ruling against Save Red Rock, hoping to avoid a trial. The county stated that the organization had failed to provide evidence that it would be harmed by the county's processing of plans for the community. At the end of 2018, Save Red Rock dropped its lawsuit against the county, deciding that its resources were not adequately focused. The proposed housing project became a political issue in the 2018 Nevada gubernatorial election and a Clark County Commission race. Commissioner Sisolak ultimately won the gubernatorial race, and Justin Jones, a lawyer for Save Red Rock, won the commission race. Gypsum Resources later accused Sisolak and Jones of conspiring to stop the housing project during their political races.

In April 2019, the Clark County Commission voted to not waive the requirement that Rhodes get right-of-way approval from the BLM. However, the commissioners did permit access to Nevada State Route 159 for construction. A month later, Gypsum Resources filed a federal lawsuit against Clark County and its commissioners. The lawsuit alleged bias from the county and a violation of due process. It also alleged a breach of contract relating to the 2010 settlement, stating that the county failed to act in good faith while reviewing documents for the proposed community. Gypsum Resources filed for Chapter 11 bankruptcy in July 2019. The company blamed its bankruptcy filing on the county and the various delays regarding the housing community. Despite the bankruptcy filing, Rhodes still intended to proceed with his plans for a community on the land. Gypsum Resources later sued the county, alleging damages up to $2 billion. As part of its legal fight, Gypsum Resources sought text messages made by Jones prior to the April 2019 vote, although these were later found to have been deleted. A United States magistrate judge ruled in April 2023 that Jones intentionally deleted the text messages against county policy, out of concern that the disclosure of their contents "would yield a negative or unfavorable outcome for him". After the judge's ruling, Nevada Republicans called on Jones to resign.

==== Later proposals ====
In August 2021, the county commission unanimously approved Gypsum Resources to build 280 homes across 563 acres at the site. The company planned to immediately begin finalization of its development plans. In October 2022, the commission gave preliminary approval to a new plan for 429 homes on 671 acres.
