= UnCommons =

Mixed-use development in Nevada, United States

- Location: Las Vegas, Nevada, United States
- Coordinates: 36.0639°N 115.2770°W
- Opened: 2022
- Developer: Matter Real Estate Group
- Website: www.uncommons.com

UnCommons is a 40-acre mixed-use development in Spring Valley, Nevada, United States, a suburb of Las Vegas, located at the southeast corner of the Clark County 215 and Durango Drive. The development, which opened in 2022, hosts shops, restaurants, and offices, and over 800 residential units when completed, and features a central greenspace as well as an event venue.

== History ==
The UnCommons development was first announced by Matter Real Estate Group in February 2019. The project, with an initial estimated $400 million construction cost, would be approved by Clark County and then receive a loan of $150 million in September. The groundbreaking of the development was initially intended to be in April 2020, but was postponed due to the ongoing COVID-19 pandemic and instead occurred in August of that year, with work on the first office buildings and parking garages at the site beginning soon after. The first tenant of these offices upon opening would be CBRE Group in July 2022. The first restaurants at UnCommons began opening in late 2022 and early 2023. The Vestra at UnCommons apartments began construction in 2022 and would also open in 2023.

By 2023, the cost of the multi-phase project would exceed $800 million, double the 2019 $400 million estimate.

== Businesses, residences, and amenities ==
=== Stores and restaurants ===
Businesses started opening at UnCommons in 2022. The initial business to open was the Speakeasy Candle Co., and the first restaurant would be SunLife Organics, a juice bar. A food hall developed by Table One Hospitality called The Sundry opened on June 12, 2023, but it would close just over a year later on June 22, 2023. A specific reason for the closure was not provided by Table One Hospitality nor the UnCommons developers, but the space is planned to be repurposed.

=== Offices ===
UnCommons began leasing office spaces in 2022 to real estate company CBRE Group. Boston-based gambling company DraftKings also moved its Las Vegas offices from Town Square, another mixed-use development in the Las Vegas Valley, to UnCommons in March 2023. Other office tenants include accounting firms BDO Global and Deloitte, financial company Morgan Stanley, and auction company Sotheby's.

=== Apartments ===
The first apartment complex, Vestra, would begin construction in 2022 and open to tenants in 2023—about half of the 352 units would be leased within 30 days of its opening. A second, 454-unit residential project called Domus is also planned to open at the development. UnCommons, when complete, will have over 800 residential units.

=== Amenities ===
Current amenities at UnCommons include The Quad, a greenspace for dining and music performances, and The Assembly, a 5,000 sq. ft. event venue. Future amenities include a movie theater and a possible hotel.

Located adjacent to UnCommons on the other side of Durango Drive is the Durango Casino and Resort, which opened in December 2023.
