= Blue Diamond Hill =

Mountain in Nevada, United States

Coordinates: 36°06′09″N 115°23′43″W

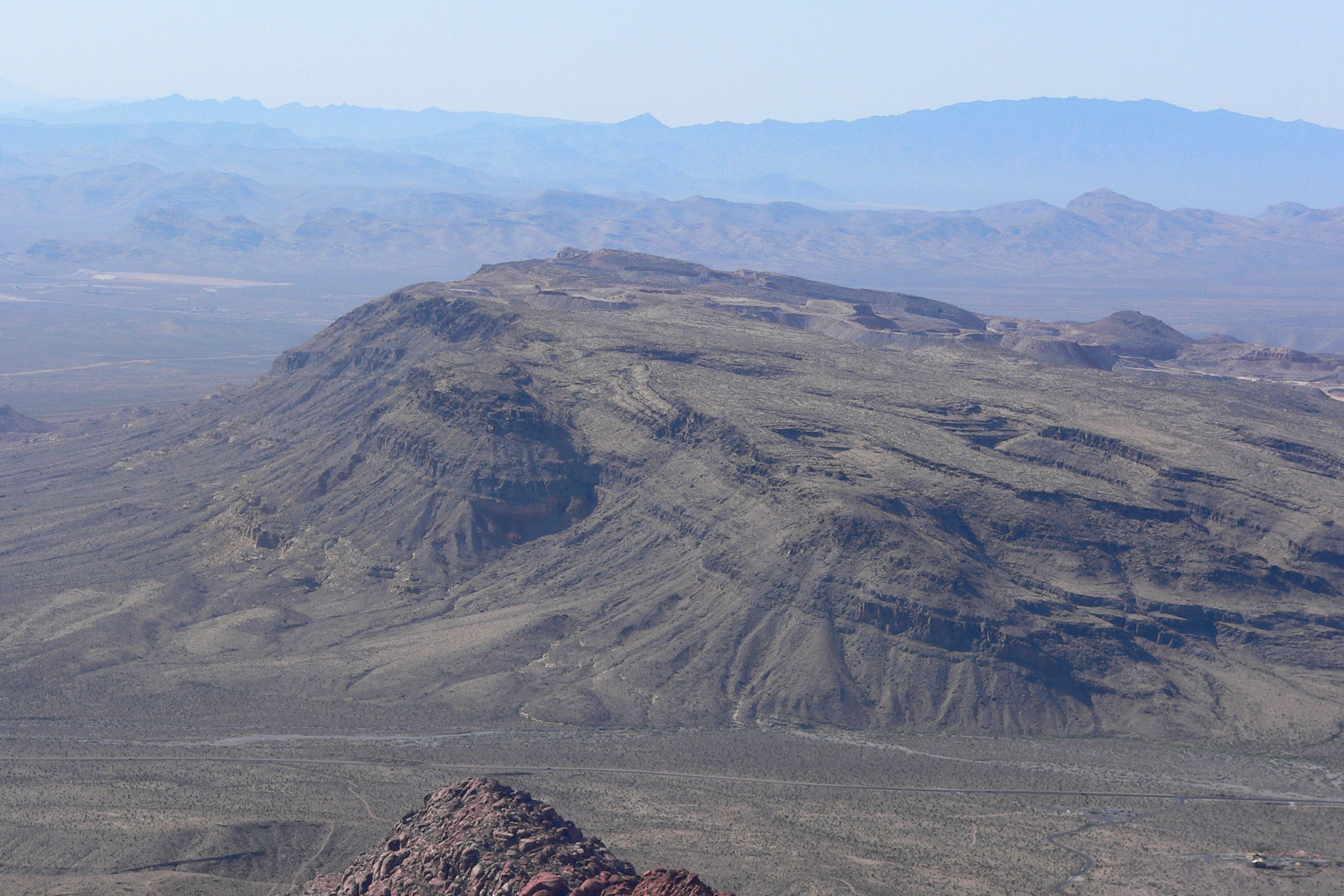
View from northwest at Turtlehead Mountain

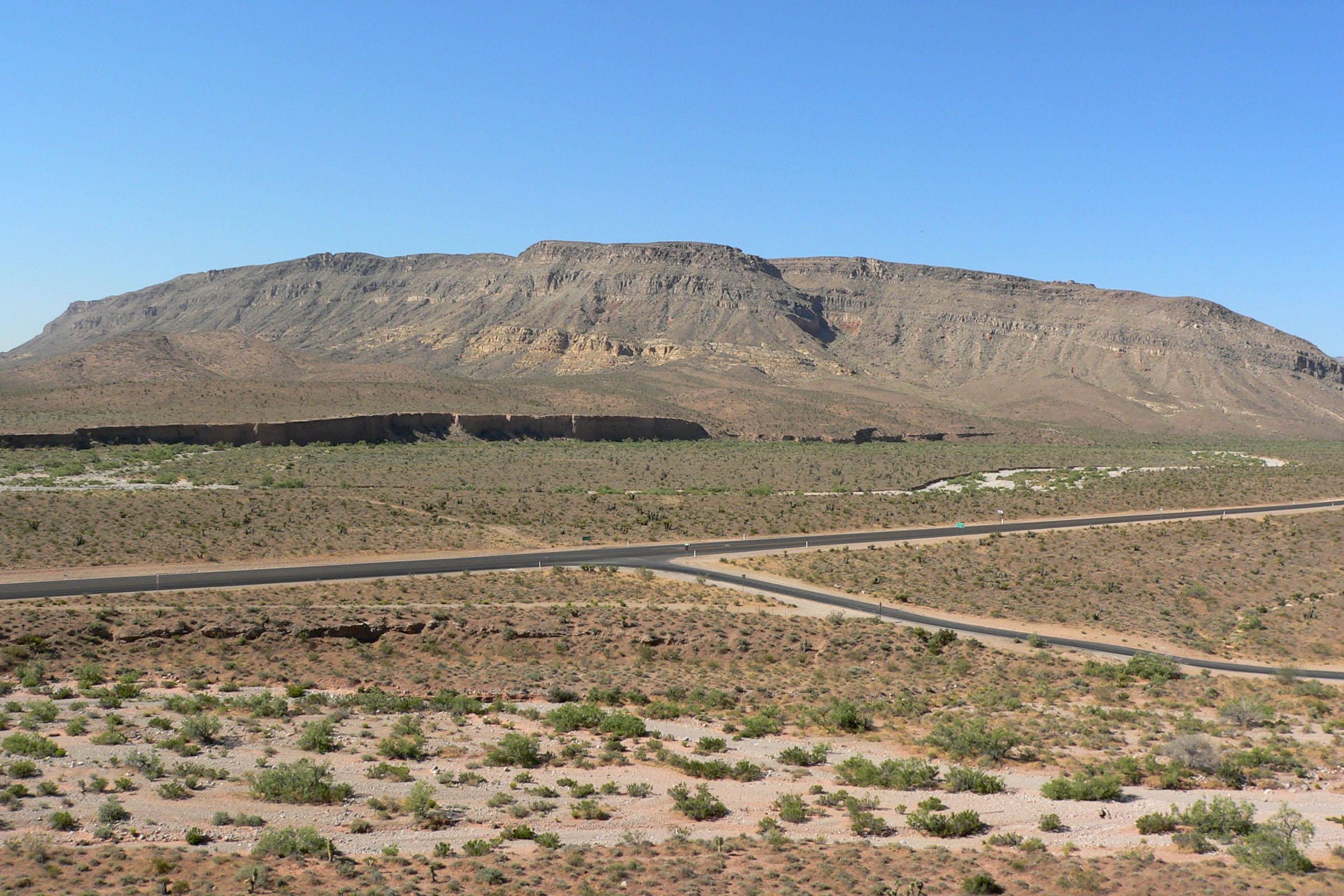
View from the north

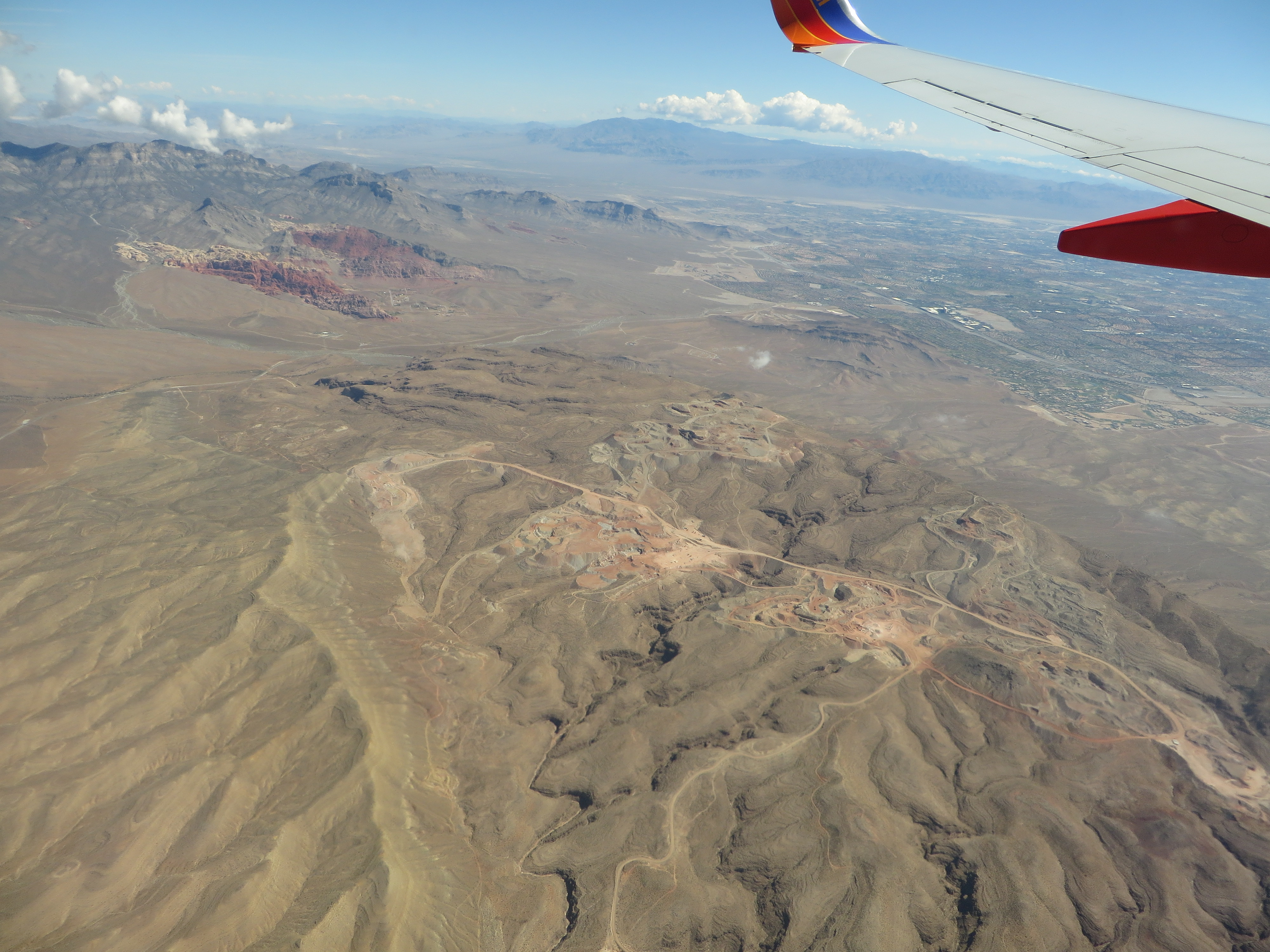
Aerial view, looking north

Blue Diamond Hill is a 4,931-foot (1,503 m) peak that borders Red Rock Canyon in Nevada, west of Las Vegas. The Blue Diamond Mine is located on the hill, and the small community of Blue Diamond, Nevada is located nearby. Several housing projects have been proposed for the hill since 2002.

== Description ==
Blue Diamond Hill is an upfaulted block, consisting of Permian and Lower Triassic sediments. It has an elevation of 4,931 feet. Nevada has 45 cactus species, 25 of which are located on Blue Diamond Hill. Cylindropuntia multigeniculata, the Blue Diamond cholla is among the cactus species there. Other plant life includes Joshua trees, yucca, and globe mallows. Gypsum mining began on the property in 1925, with the opening of the Blue Diamond Mine. In the 1990s, approximately 17,000 plants were salvaged from the area and its mining operations, to be transplanted in a desert trails park in Logandale, Nevada. The endangered Blue Diamond cholla was protected through a mutual arrangement between James Hardie Gypsum, the Bureau of Land Management (BLM), and The Nature Conservancy.

The Blue Diamond cholla is listed as a critically endangered and fully protected species by the State of Nevada. As of 2000, there were approximately 6,000 Blue Diamond cholla plants on the mountain, occupying 300 acres. It was later discovered that the Blue Diamond cholla also grows in a half-dozen other areas, located in the north half of Clark County, Nevada and in northwest Arizona. The United States Fish and Wildlife Service counted 56,000 Blue Diamond chollas in those areas during 2005. Those located on Blue Diamond Hill are the most accessible.

== Proposed development ==
=== Power plant ===
In the late 1980s, plans were proposed for a $100 million hydroelectric power plant to be built at Blue Diamond Hill, on land owned by the BLM. It would be built by the Blue Diamond North Pumped Storage Power Co., later known as Blue Diamond Power Partners. Nearby residents initially rejected the proposed project. To alleviate concerns about its proximity to Red Rock Canyon, the proposed site was moved one mile south, on land that was also owned by the BLM and was located near the gypsum mine. Clark County planners were worried about the visual impact that the plant would have on the area, and also expressed concern about dust problems during construction and operation. There were also environmental concerns that the project would affect the Blue Diamond cholla. The power plant would permanently disrupt 104 acres, but would generate a projected $25 million in state and local taxes over a 20-year period.

An environmental impact statement for the project was approved in 1996, and the Federal Energy Regulatory Commission approved the project a year later. In April 2001, the $320 million project was nearing the end of its permitting process, with construction expected to begin the following year. The Clark County Commission was split on whether to approve the project, while some residents were concerned that the plant would affect the surrounding scenery. Environmentalists considered the project unnecessary. The Sierra Club claimed that the plant would be located within Red Rock Canyon, which was expanded in 1994 to include further land. The BLM later denied that the land was part of Red Rock Canyon.

In June 2001, Blue Diamond Power Partners withdrew its request from the Clark County Commission for a use permit, choosing instead to seek a federal permit. U.S. senator Harry Reid introduced a bill that would extend the power plant's FERC licensing, allowing the project to proceed. However, Reid put the bill on hold until issues could be resolved, such as the project's potential impact on the environment. Another condition was that the project receive local approval. The project also needed approval from the Las Vegas Valley Water District. Construction had yet to begin as of 2003, although Blue Diamond Power Partners still intended to proceed. The project remains unbuilt.

=== Residential projects ===
In 2002, John Laing Homes proposed a residential community to be built on nearly 3,000 acres atop Blue Diamond Hill, bringing an estimated 21,000 new residents to the area. The proposal was withdrawn later that year after opposition. Developer Jim Rhodes purchased acreage on Blue Diamond Hill in 2003, and has since made several proposals for a housing community on the land, although the projects have been opposed as well.
