= Durango Casino and Resort =

Hotel and casino in Las Vegas, Nevada

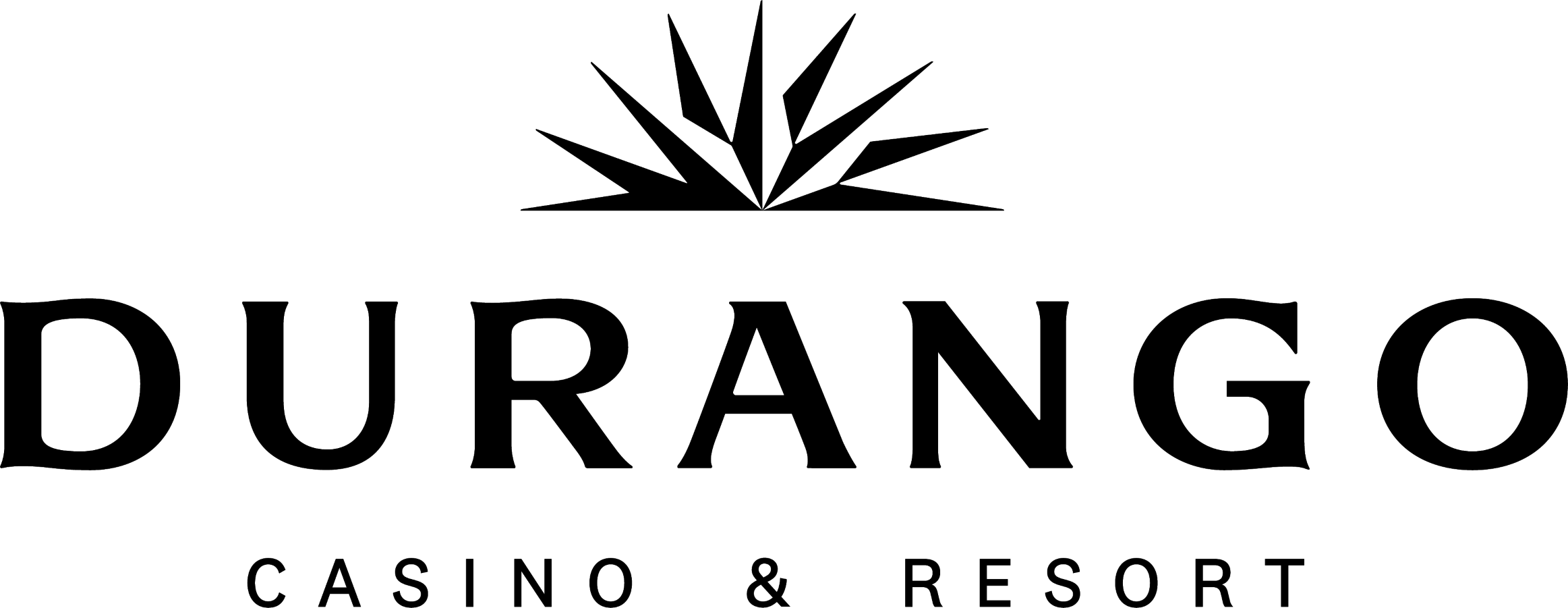
- Interactive map of Durango Casino and Resort
- Location: Rhodes Ranch, Spring Valley, Nevada; 6915 South Durango Drive; 36.063559°N 115.282846°W
- Opened: December 5, 2023
- No. of rooms: 209
- Gaming space: 83,178 sq ft (7,727.5 m^{2})
- Casino type: Land-based
- Owner: Red Rock Resorts
- Architect: Friedmutter Group
- Website: www.durangoresort.com

Durango Casino and Resort (Note: Also known as "Durango Resort", and "Durango Casino & Resort".) is a hotel and casino in Rhodes Ranch, a community in the Las Vegas Valley. It is located along Durango Drive, beside the Las Vegas Beltway. The resort includes an 83,178 sq ft (7,727.5 m^{2}) casino, 209 rooms in a 15-story tower, and several restaurants.

Station Casinos purchased the property from developer Jim Rhodes in 2000. Four years later, the company announced plans for a hotel-casino, known then as Durango Station. The 1,000-room project was met with opposition from area residents, who disagreed with its size and its proposed location near a new elementary school. The project was approved by the Clark County Commission despite the opposition, although Station did not plan to begin construction for several years.

The company later announced plans to begin building a scaled-down version of Durango Station in 2009, with an opening in 2011. However, before the start of construction, the project was delayed indefinitely due to the Great Recession. In 2021, Station's parent company, Red Rock Resorts, announced plans to proceed with the project once again. Construction began in early 2022, and Durango opened on December 5, 2023.

== History ==
In 2000, developer Jim Rhodes sold 51 acres of land to Station Casinos, for less than $37 million. The property is located at the southwest corner of Durango Drive and the Las Vegas Beltway, in the northeast corner of the Rhodes Ranch community. The property had been zoned for a neighborhood casino three years earlier, although Station had no imminent plans to develop the site, instead waiting for the general area to develop further. Station purchased an additional 30 acres, but later sold 10 acres to a residential developer.

=== Initial proposals ===
In 2004, the company proposed Durango Station, a casino with up to 215,000 sq ft (20,000 m^{2}), and a 217-foot-tall hotel with 1,000 rooms. The start of construction was at least four years away. The large project caused controversy among area residents who argued that it did not fit the definition of a neighborhood casino. Residents also believed that a hotel-casino was no longer compatible with the area, as Durango Station would be built 1,500 feet from a new elementary school, and other nearby land was zoned for future homes.

Residents of Summerlin had previously teamed up with the Culinary Workers Union to oppose the height of the Red Rock Resort, which had been proposed by the non-union Station Casinos. Rhodes Ranch residents followed suit in their opposition against Durango Station, hoping to stop the project or at least decrease it in size. A 1997 development agreement made it unlikely that the county could stop the project entirely. Residents who purchased homes in the area had also been made aware of a potential hotel-casino. Station clarified that the 1997 agreement allowed for up to 215,000 square-feet, but that the company did not intend to build a casino that large. Design work on the project had yet to begin.

Despite opposition, the Clark County Commission approved the project in December 2004, but with its gaming space capped at 120,000 sq ft (11,000 m^{2}). At this size, it would still be Station's largest casino, and the largest locals casino in Las Vegas. Approximately 75 percent of residents opposed the commission's decision to approve the project. Lynette Boggs McDonald, a county commissioner overseeing the district for the planned project, proposed that neighborhood casinos be clearly defined to prevent future controversial projects. As a result of the Durango Station controversy, the commission later started a committee to create new regulations for neighborhood casinos.

In March 2005, Station announced plans to accelerate development on the land, with intentions to open a Regal Cinemas movie theater on the site in 2006, ahead of the hotel-casino. The theater facility would include 17 screens and would eventually be incorporated into the resort. Construction on the theater did not begin as expected.

Station announced revised details regarding the project in July 2008. A first phase of construction would include a 201-room hotel tower, a casino, restaurants, a movie theater, and 190,000 sq ft (18,000 m^{2}) of retail space, which would be developed and operated by a joint partner. The retail complex would be similar to The District at Green Valley Ranch. A second phase would eventually add 525 rooms. The number of rooms was scaled back from what was previously planned, and a proposed bowling alley and bingo room were removed as well.

Construction was scheduled to begin in 2009, with an opening in 2011. However, the start of construction was contingent on the state of the economy, as the Great Recession was underway at the time. By November 2008, economic conditions had worsened, prompting Station to delay the project indefinitely. Station filed for bankruptcy in 2009, but it kept the Durango site with plans to eventually develop the project.

=== Project revival and opening ===
In 2019, Station's parent company, Red Rock Resorts, noted the Durango site's visibility and access from the Las Vegas Beltway. The property was also five miles away from the nearest major casino, and was located in an area that the company considered to be largely underserved. By the end of 2020, the company was working on plans for a hotel-casino project on the site. Red Rock expected the Durango property to become its primary development project.

On May 4, 2021, Red Rock confirmed that it would begin construction on the project in early 2022, noting that it would be built in the fastest-growing area of the Las Vegas Valley. The company also announced that it would sell its Palms resort for $650 million. The sale would help finance the Durango project, which was initially expected to cost $750 million. During construction, the cost would increase to $780 million, primarily due to an expansion of the casino floor. The rising cost of construction materials and labor also contributed to the budget increase.

Durango was approved by the county in October 2021. Red Rock Resorts and Station Casinos hosted a ceremonial groundbreaking event on March 11, 2022, following preparation work on the land. Durango was built on 50 acres along the east side of the property, while the remainder was sold to a residential developer, which is expected to use the land for apartments. W.A. Richardson Builder LLC was the project's general contractor. The 15-story hotel tower was topped off on October 7, 2022.

Durango opened on December 5, 2023, two weeks later than originally scheduled; some areas of the resort were not ready in time to allow for proper staff training, prompting the delay. In Las Vegas, Durango marks the first Station hotel-casino to be built since the 2008 opening of Aliante Station. It is also the first in a new line of Station properties planned for Las Vegas as part of the company's renewed expansion efforts.

== Features ==
Durango was designed by Friedmutter Group. The design was inspired by desert landscapes like the Red Rock Resort, and Durango will target a similar demographic. In a departure from most casinos, Durango includes windows that allow for natural light on the gaming floor, which measures 83,178 sq ft (7,727.5 m^{2}). The casino includes a 10,000 sq ft (930 m^{2}) sportsbook, which has indoor and outdoor areas, and is accompanied by an adjacent sports lounge.

Durango includes the Eat Your Heart Out food hall, featuring 11 eateries. The resort also has four standalone restaurants, including a Mexican eatery. Lettuce Entertain You Enterprises operates Summer House, a California-themed restaurant. The company had operated in Las Vegas for 24 years, although Summer House marks its first off-Strip restaurant. Additional features include 20,000 sq ft (1,900 m^{2}) of convention space, an event lawn, and 40 electric vehicle charging stations.

The hotel has 209 rooms, including 29 suites, in a 216-foot tower. A $116 million expansion began in January 2025, and is expected to conclude about a year later. The project, taking place on the property's south side, will add additional casino space and a second parking garage. Unlike other Station properties, Durango does not include a bowling alley or movie theater. Plans to add such facilities were announced as part of a second expansion project, which will also add additional gaming and dining space, all on the property's north side. The $385 million expansion is expected to last 18 months, with construction beginning in January 2026.
