= Jim Rhodes (developer) =

American real estate developer (born 1958)

- Born: James Rhodes; 1958 (age 67–68)
- Occupations: Real estate developer, mine operator, commercial farm operator
- Known for: Developing large-scale communities including Rhodes Ranch and Tuscany Village in Las Vegas, Nevada.
- Children: 2
- Parent(s): Leonard Rhodes & Betsy Rhodes
- Website: https://jim-rhodes.org

Jim Rhodes (born 1958) is an American real estate developer, mine operator and commercial farmer. He founded Rhodes Homes in 1985 and has developed various housing projects in the Las Vegas Valley, including the golf course communities Rhodes Ranch and Tuscany Village. In the 2000s, he was a well-known philanthropist in Las Vegas. In 2008, he formed Harmony Homes and began buying distressed properties during the Great Recession. Not including Harmony Homes, Rhodes filed for Chapter 11 bankruptcy on behalf of many of his companies in 2009 and turned over most of his residential projects to creditors.

Rhodes is considered one of Las Vegas' most successful and controversial developers. He earned $2.4 billion in revenue by 2009. In addition, several of his housing projects received opposition from nearby residents. Among the opposed projects is a series of controversial efforts to develop a residential community at Blue Diamond Hill, located west of Las Vegas near Red Rock Canyon.

In 2005, he proposed five residential communities in Arizona, mostly near the city of Kingman. The communities would add 131,000 new homes, but residents and government officials were concerned about the amount of water that these projects would require upon completion. The projects never materialized, and Rhodes subsequently used some of the property as farmland beginning in 2013, when he formed Kingman Farms and developed an interest in agriculture. However, locals were still concerned about his use of water for the farming operations. As of 2017, Rhodes had built approximately 11,000 homes in the Las Vegas Valley as developer, and 25,000 to 30,000 homes working as a contractor.

== Early life ==
Jim Rhodes was born in 1958, to Dr. Leonard Rhodes, a dentist, and Betsy Rhodes. He grew up in Las Vegas and attended Clark High School. Inspired by his father's friends in real estate, Rhodes developed an early interest in wealth and business. He later said, "My dream was to buy a Rolls-Royce or a Bentley or something, just to have it. Not that I wanted to drive it — just that I was able to do it." During his youth, he worked various jobs, including mowing lawns and also worked at the Las Vegas Country Club, where he washed towels and tennis courts. He spent four years saving money to buy a Chevrolet Corvette.

== Career ==
By the age of 21, Rhodes began framing houses in Las Vegas, and started a subcontracting firm. He had a crew of approximately 100 people and earned up to $100,000 a year.

In 1984, Rhodes became a contractor and started building his own houses.

He founded Rhodes Homes in 1985, and served as its president. He also held the position of chief executive officer for 21 years. Rhodes Companies was founded in 1988.

In 1990, Jim Rhodes started buying land for Spanish Hills, and by 1991 he started assembling land for Spanish Hills community in the southwest valley where only custom homes are built. Other residential communities followed thereafter. In the mid-1990s, Rhodes Homes built Palm Gardens and Elkhorn Springs, located respectively in the southeast and northwest Las Vegas Valley. Two other projects, Palm Canyon and Palm Hills, were built at the base of Black Mountain in Henderson, Nevada.

In 1996, he proposed a residential project known as Rhodes Ranch in the southwest Las Vegas Valley. The project proceeded despite opposition from residents in what was then a rural area. Rhodes Ranch opened in 1997. It includes a golf course designed by Ted Robinson. Rhodes Ranch is considered to be Rhodes' signature project.

Another prominent project is Henderson's Tuscany Village, originally proposed by Rhodes in the 1990s as Palm City. The site for Palm City was located near sewage ponds and a longtime manufacturer of chemicals which had contaminated the land. Ground water was also found to have higher than normal radioactive levels, but Rhodes Design and Development Corporation planned to proceed with the project. Local officials did not declare a health concern. A environmental scientist with the Nevada Division of Environmental Protection said, "We have no concerns about the ground water from a public health standpoint." Nearby residents were concerned about the presence of chemicals, as well as the size of Palm City and the increased traffic that the project would bring to the area. After Rhodes' lender became insolvent, he sold the undeveloped land in 2000, and it was renamed Tuscany. However, he later took back control of the project. Tuscany opened in the mid-2000s and includes a golf course designed by Robinson.

Since 2003, Rhodes has been involved in several controversial efforts to develop a residential community at Blue Diamond Hill, located west of Las Vegas near Red Rock Canyon. These efforts have been opposed by nearby residents and environmentalists, and have been mired in litigation against government entities. Rhodes, through his company Gypsum Resources, initially planned for up to 5,500 homes on his 2,400 acres atop Blue Diamond Hill. In 2003, a bill was signed into state law preventing Rhodes from developing the property, prompting him to sue. The Supreme Court of Nevada eventually ruled the law as unconstitutional. Several modified proposals were made by Rhodes in the 2010s, though none materialized. In the meantime, he has operated a gypsum mine known as the Blue Diamond Mine, selling approximately 1 million tons of gypsum each year.

In 2011, Clark County approved a housing concept plan by Gypsum Resources while placing conditions on their approval, which included obtaining a right of way from the Bureau of Land Management (BLM) to build an access road to the property. For years, Gypsum pursued a waiver of the right of way condition. In April 2019, newly elected Clark County Commissioner Justin Jones motioned to deny Gypsum's BLM waiver request. The commission voted unanimously to deny the request, thereby indefinitely stalling the development. Gypsum Resources declared bankruptcy in 2019, but has planned to continue in its housing development efforts. Rhodes' lawyers had long accused Jones of misconduct related to his 2019 vote. Rhodes filed a lawsuit against the county and its commissioners that year, and it was later discovered that Jones had deleted text messages related to his 2019 vote. A United States magistrate judge ruled that Jones lied to the court about destroying evidence and sanctioned him. Jones was also ordered to pay Rhodes' attorney fees.

=== Outside Nevada ===
In April 2004, Rhodes began to consider the idea of residential development in Arizona. Later that year, he purchased 2,500 acres in Mohave County, Arizona. In 2005, he announced his plans to develop residential projects in Golden Valley and White Hills, both in Mohave County near the city of Kingman. In Golden Valley, Rhodes had acquired 5,760 acres for development, and the project there would include a golf course and a recreation center. Rhodes also planned to open a Golden Valley Park with two baseball fields. More than 3,000 acres had been purchased for the White Hills project. Both sites were considered desirable because of their location between Las Vegas and Phoenix. The completion of the Hoover Dam Bypass project was also viewed favorably, as it would cut down on the amount of travel time between Las Vegas and the proposed communities.

During 2005, Rhodes built 69 homes in Kingman to test the local market. The homes sold out in seven hours. Later in the year, Rhodes Homes announced plans for five master-planned communities in Arizona, containing 131,000 houses spread across more than 20,000 acres. The projects were planned as bedroom communities to Las Vegas. The Mohave County Planning and Zoning Commission recommended approval of four of the projects, which initially received little opposition from the public. Rhodes formed a water company to serve residents of the future communities.

Among the projects was Golden Valley Ranch, which would have more than 33,000 homes; and The Village at White Hills, with approximately 20,000 homes. Golden Valley Ranch would have similarities to Rhodes Ranch, such as a golf course designed by Robinson. Two other approved projects, Peacock Highlands and Peacock Vistas, would be located northeast of Kingman, near the Peacock Mountains. They would contain a total of 59,000 homes on more than 9,200 acres. Despite some opposition from locals, the Mohave County Board of Supervisors granted preliminary approval in late 2005 for four of the communities. The fifth, known as the Retreat at Temple Bar, was rejected. It was to include 19,000 homes on approximately 3,000 acres. The National Park Service opposed the project, which would have been located within the Lake Mead National Recreation Area. In addition, residents in Boulder City, Nevada were concerned about the amount of traffic that would travel through their city, located in between the proposed Arizona communities and Las Vegas.

In 2006, Rhodes prevailed in a bidding war to purchase approximately 57,000 acres of New Mexico land from Westland Development Company. The property, mostly vacant, was located west of Albuquerque. Rhodes was to purchase the land through one of his companies, Sedora Holdings. However, another company ultimately outbid Sedora. At the end of 2006, Rhodes paid $58.6 million to purchase more than 1,000 acres of state trust land in Apache Junction, Arizona, where he planned another residential community, separate from the other five. Rhodes also had the rights to master-plan another 6,700 acres of surrounding land in Apache Junction.

The Golden Valley project later became known as Pravada. Construction was temporarily suspended in April 2007, because of approval issues concerning land use, zoning, and water availability. Only four model homes had been built, and construction was expected to resume once approval had been granted. Some local residents welcomed the Pravada project, while others were against it and the growth it would bring to the area. Residents and government officials were also concerned about the large amount of water that Pravada would require. Rhodes sought approval to operate his water company in Mojave County for his residential projects. The Arizona Corporation Commission (ACC) debated for years whether to approve Rhodes, as there were concerns about his past legal problems, as well as a lack of water in the area. Rhodes testified to the commission in April 2007 that he was usually the victim in past legal disputes, blaming employees or immoral lawyers and business partners.

The ACC considered Rhodes' plans a top priority and one of the most important cases in its history. The Arizona Department of Water Resources conducted a preliminary study which indicated that there was not enough water in the area to support the various residential projects. Rhodes and the Mohave County manager later worked together to put pressure on the ACC to get approval for the water company. This caused concern about Rhodes receiving favorable treatment from county staff. Rhodes had also donated to congressional members of Arizona. In a separate case, the Arizona Department of Water Resources granted an application to another Las Vegas developer, Leonard Mardian, for water rights in Mohave County. Mardian's application had been filed after Rhodes had already requested the water rights, but Mardian's was approved first as it was considered a complete application. This reduced the amount of water that Rhodes would be eligible to take. Rhodes sued the water department, stating that his application should have been approved first.

Rhodes' affiliation with a Nevada politician became a topic of concern during his effort to get water approval in Arizona. In the 2000s, Rhodes had close connections with members of the Clark County Commission, and he was a major financial contributor to commission campaigns. Commissioner Erin Kenny was a resident in Rhodes Ranch, and she was later charged in a bribery scheme that was investigated through Operation G-Sting. Strip club owner Michael Galardi, a witness in the case, told the FBI that Rhodes had paid commissioner Kenny $20,000 a month to work in his favor while she was on the county commission, a claim that Rhodes denied. Rhodes was also a significant donor to Kenny's failed 2002 campaign for lieutenant governor of Nevada. After she left the commission in 2003, Rhodes hired her to work as a consultant for $200,000 a year. He continued to pay for her services even after she admitted to bribery later in 2003.

Rhodes' relationship with Kenny became a subject of interest for Arizona officials. Rhodes responded that he was no longer paying Kenny and that the matter was irrelevant to ACC's approval of water rights. However, in July 2007, a judge ordered that the ACC's investigation into Rhodes be reopened after the revelations involving Kenny came to light. The ACC had questions about why Rhodes continued to pay Kenny $200,000 a year after she admitted to the bribery scheme.

In late 2007, Rhodes sold his Arizona water company to an Illinois firm that would manage it, negating the need for him to get approval from the ACC. The sale made it unlikely that Rhodes would have to testify about his relationship with Kenny. He sold the company in hopes of expediting development of the proposed communities. Rhodes subsequently stated that there was enough water to last 100 years for residents of Pravada. In 2008, the Mohave County Board of Supervisors approved a zoning plan and development agreement for Pravada, despite continued opposition from some local residents. By the end of 2008, Rhodes hoped for construction of Pravada to begin in a year. However, the proposed communities in Arizona never materialized.

=== Great Recession ===
During the Great Recession (2007-2009), homebuilder Rhodes Homes faced limitations due to a 2005 loan agreement with Credit Suisse that restricted buying distressed properties. In response, a separate development firm, Harmony Homes, was established in 2008 to capitalize on these opportunities. Harmony Homes achieved success, selling an average of 400 houses annually and expanding to southern California.

By 2009, Rhodes Companies had developed 40 communities and built over 6,000 homes in the Las Vegas Valley, generating $2.4 billion in revenue. However, the company also defaulted on the 2005 Credit Suisse loan.

In March 2009, Rhodes Companies and affiliated entities filed for Chapter 11 bankruptcy. While Jim Rhodes estimated a significant number of creditors, he maintained minimal disruption to daily operations and ongoing development projects. At the time, Rhodes Homes was the third-largest private homebuilder in southern Nevada but faced financial difficulties with liabilities exceeding assets. Explanations for the bankruptcy included Jim Rhodes' expansion plans in Arizona encountering infrastructure challenges. The main assets of Rhodes Companies included Rhodes Ranch and Tuscany developments, while the company employed less than 100 people.

A group of creditors, including Credit Suisse, sought to replace Rhodes with a trustee to operate his companies. The creditors claimed that Rhodes was irresponsible with finances, alleging that he had recently used company funds to pay family members large sums of money for limited services. The creditors also alleged that Rhodes gave himself a $75,000 bonus in addition to his annual $400,000 salary. It was also alleged that he used corporate money to make payments to his ex-wife, Deborah Rhodes, as part of a divorce settlement. Simultaneously, Rhodes was sued in a separate case by a local bank for failing to make loan payments. The creditors later withdrew the motion to replace Rhodes, letting him retain control of company operations.

Later in 2009, Rhodes agreed to turn most of his Nevada properties – including Spanish Hills – over to lenders to close the bankruptcy cases. Residents of Tuscany welcomed the news of Rhodes' departure, as they felt that Rhodes had mismanaged the community's homeowner association (HOA). In recent years, the HOA had seen frequent changes in its board presidents and community managers, and residents alleged that community upkeep had been neglected. Creditors led by Credit Suisse were owed $370 million, and they took over control of Rhodes Ranch and Tuscany in January 2010. Later that year, Rhodes paid $1.4 million to buy back 1,600 acres in Golden Valley. The land was part of the unfinished Pravada project, which had four model homes and five unfinished homes, all of which faced the possibility of demolition.

In 2012, Rhodes had concerns that the trustee in charge of his former Rhodes Companies was planning to sue him for misuse of corporate funds. In response to the potential lawsuit, Rhodes sought to remove the judge, Linda Riegle, from the case. Rhodes' lawyer stated that Riegle displayed "open and blatant animosity towards Rhodes and his business practices" during an earlier hearing, and that she had encouraged the trustee to file a lawsuit. Riegle denied the allegations and the request that she be taken off the case.

Later in 2012, creditors filed a lawsuit against Rhodes, alleging that he had misused $132 million in company funds, resulting in the 2009 downfall of his companies. Rhodes stated that the bankruptcy filing was caused by the Great Recession, not wrongful spending. Despite the earlier takeover of Rhodes' properties, lenders were still owed $302 million. Creditors wanted to seize Rhodes' land at Blue Diamond Hill to recoup their losses. During 2012, because of poor economic conditions caused by the Great Recession, Rhodes returned 1,000 acres of Apache Junction land to the state of Arizona. Rhodes lost $18 million on the failed project.

=== Farming ===
In 2013, Rhodes ventured into the farming industry. He founded Kingman Farms and began using land in Golden Valley that was previously planned for Pravada. Rhodes grew alfalfa and melons on the property. In addition, he owned two sites at Red Lake, also near Kingman. At one of the sites, he sold the land to Red Lake Ventures, a limited liability company formed in April 2014. The two partnered, with Red Lake Ventures employing Kingman Farms to farm on the land. Their partnership ended less than five months later, as Red Lake Ventures was displeased with the work. Meanwhile, Rhodes sought a land exchange with the Bureau of Land Management (BLM) to increase his acreage at the other Red Lake site for further farming. The BLM later found that Rhodes had illegally built a road on part of BLM property, and had also destroyed a historic section marker in the process, which is a federal crime. The proposed land swap never took place.

Like his housing projects, the farming operations also drew a negative response from local residents. Rhodes' farms required a significant amount of water, causing concern among locals, who also complained of severe dust caused by the farming operations.

Harmony Homes spent $30 million on farming equipment and workers for the Kingman Farms venture. Farming took up most of Rhodes' time, partially taking his attention away from the real estate market. He found the farming experience to be enjoyable and educational, although his attorney initially stated that Kingman Farms was an experimental enterprise with an unknown future. Another attorney later denied local concerns that Rhodes would eventually build houses on the land, saying that his shift to agriculture was not just a temporary project.

In 2018, a subsidiary of Kingman Farms filed for Chapter 11 bankruptcy. Rhodes' farming largely shifted from alfalfa to nut orchards, which consume less water. As of 2019, the farming site at Red Lake was no longer in use.

== Controversies and lawsuits ==
Rhodes is considered one of Las Vegas' most successful and controversial developers. He has been the subject of much publicity, variously describing Rhodes as a visionary, but also impatient, and untrustworthy. He said, "I just work and try hard, and try to do good work. I signed up to be a builder and not (to) be popular or unpopular." Rhodes said the criticism came from jealous competitors, as well as business partners who had tried to swindle him out of money. In later years, Rhodes avoided business partners, saying, "They don't always have honest intentions, and they are little scammers. They lay awake at night trying to figure out how to scam you." Rhodes also blamed himself for critical stories, saying he often allowed them to be written, without defending himself or raising concerns about inaccuracies. Construction workers have filed various complaints against Rhodes claiming he failed to pay them. Rhodes said some workers were dishonest about the hours they billed compared to the hours they actually worked.

In 1993 Rhodes partnered with Marshall and Louis Goldman on the Palm Gardens project. They later accused him of withholding their share of profits and diverting the funds to his own companies. An arbitrator ruled in favor of the partners, while concluding that Rhodes had engaged in self-dealing, although Rhodes appealed the case several times. In 2006 the Supreme Court of Nevada ordered Rhodes to pay a $2.1 million judgment in the case. Marshall Goldman died during the lengthy litigation. Prior to his death he said in 2004, "Personally, I have nothing against Rhodes."

In 1998, Rhodes was also sued by his partner in the Palm Canyon and Palm Hills projects. The partner, Rainbow Development Corporation, alleged that Rhodes became more difficult to access as the projects progressed. The lawsuit alleged that Rhodes mismanaged the projects and withheld financial information. The company sought to be appointed as the managing member of Palm Canyon or to have the property placed into receivership. The suit also sought $10,000 in damages for fraud, breach of contract, and negligent mismanagement. Rainbow Development also accused Rhodes of self-dealing. His attorney denied the claims and stated that Rainbow Development was frequently kept updated through weekly meetings. A judge denied Rainbow Development's request to remove Rhodes Design and Development as managing partner in September 1998. Two months later, control of Palm Hills was granted to a receiver, who vowed Rhodes would never regain control of the project. However, on March 20, 1999, an entity affiliated with Rhodes sought to purchase the assets of a bankruptcy estate which included Palm Hills to which the receiver announced, "I am humiliated." Two days later, Rhodes regained control after a receiver court approved the sale for $13.5 million. The case was eventually resolved confidentially in 2007.

As of 1999, residents of Elkhorn Springs had yet to receive a promised five-acre park, despite a verbal agreement made three years earlier between Rhodes and the director of Las Vegas parks. However, a written agreement was never made, and the lack of a paper trail led to a dispute between Rhodes and the city about which would be responsible for building the park. To force Rhodes into discussions, the city temporarily refused to issue occupancy permits for some of his completed homes. Rhodes Homes eventually agreed to provide land for a park, while the city would provide $1 million to construct it.

In 2002, Rhodes was accused of breaking federal law after he allegedly funneled money to Dario Herrera's congressional campaign and Harry Reid's 2004 Senate campaign. Through 14 employees and two employee spouses, Rhodes spent a total of $27,000 in corporate funds to support the two campaigns. Federal law prevented corporate funds from being donated to federal campaigns, and prohibited money from being contributed in other people's names. Rhodes had also exceeded the maximum donation amount. Both campaigns were unaware of the true source of the contributions. After an investigation by the Federal Election Commission, Rhodes agreed in 2005 to pay a $148,000 fine to settle the complaint.

Rhodes and businessman Scott Dunton had initially competed against each other in a bidding war for the land in Golden Valley. Dunton claimed that Rhodes had later agreed to sell a portion of the land to him, before reneging on the deal and keeping ownership of all the acreage. In 2007, a court ruled in favor of Dunton and ordered Rhodes to sell 5,184 acres in Golden Valley to him.

Rhodes sought to improve his reputation in 2007, when he pledged to donate $11 million to the Nevada Cancer Institute, following his father's death from cancer in 2002. Rhodes intended to make the donations over the course of 10 to 15 years, but the institute wanted the money sooner. In response, Rhodes tried to delay the payments, leading to a lawsuit by the institute after it spent 18 months trying to resolve the issue. The case was later withdrawn by the institute.

=== Defective housing ===
Numerous lawsuits and complaints have been filed against Rhodes for defective housing. In early 1999 the Nevada State Contractors Board nearly suspended the contractor license for Rhodes Homes following construction defect complaints from 19 homeowners. One couple claimed more than 30 problems with their house and that Rhodes Homes was slow to make repairs. An employee of Rhodes Homes was identified as the cause of the delays and their employment was terminated. Rhodes Homes was placed on probation for a year and fined $5,000 plus legal fees.

New complaints regarding home defects came in as the company worked to resolve existing complaints. At the end of 1999, more than 350 homeowners at Palm Gardens filed suit against 51 defendants including Rhodes Homes and 46 subcontractors alleging defects in 236 of the community's 599 homes. The case was settled four years later for $12.5 million. Roofing defects were the primary cause of complaint. Subcontractors paid $9.5 million and Rhodes Homes paid $3 million.

In 1997 three home builders, including Rhodes, were sued by 188 Casa Linda subdivision homeowners for housing defects. The houses had been built on expansive soil, which lifted some homes as high as five inches, causing cracks in drywall. The case settled in 2000 for $16.2 million which was, at the time, the highest residential construction defect settlement in Nevada history. Rhodes paid several million towards the settlement.

In 2001, Rhodes was sued by 19 homeowners at Elkhorn Springs over defective housing.

Rhodes has attributed many lawsuits on corrupt lawyers, stating that they had recruited clients to sue housing developers for minor issues. Rhodes said, "I'm sure some cases have some merit. But I also think they might be playing a little fast and loose in making allegations that are not substantiated." A total of 43 complaints were filed against Rhodes with the Nevada State Contractors Board from 2002 to 2007. Nearly half of those complaints were determined to be unfounded.

== Personal life and philanthropy ==
Rhodes has two brothers, and has been married four times. In the 1980s, he married Deborah Parness. They were married for 12 years and had two sons. Rhodes married wife Glynda in Hawaii on April 8, 2004. The couple had children from previous marriages but none together. The couple soon became known for their fundraising efforts and extravagant spending, and became well known philanthropists in the Las Vegas area. In 2007, Rhodes donated $2 million to the Lou Ruvo Center for Brain Health. Free houses were also given away through Rhodes Homes, and the company was also a supporter of the Make-A-Wish Foundation. Rhodes was also a longtime donor to the Down Syndrome Organization of Southern Nevada. His nephew has down syndrome, which inspired him to become active in the organization.

Jim and Glynda Rhodes filed for divorce in 2011, citing incompatibility. Glynda Rhodes alleged that her husband was responsible for the couple's debt. Their divorce proceedings were ongoing as of 2012. A year later, Rhodes married his fourth wife, a woman almost half his age.

Rhodes has owned several mansions in the Las Vegas Valley. In 2016, he began construction on a mansion in his Spanish Hills community. Three years later, he listed it for sale, at a price of $30 million. It sold later that year for $16 million, marking the second-highest home resale in Las Vegas history.

In the 2000s, Rhodes was a Republican. He is also a Presbyterian. Although he has developed several golf courses, he rarely plays golf himself, saying in 2005, "I have played three or four times in my life and the last time I played was 20 years ago. I can see myself picking up the game and becoming obsessed, playing four hours a day. I don't have that kind of time."
