= Arden, Nevada =

Unincorporated community located in Nevada, United States

Arden
- Unincorporated community
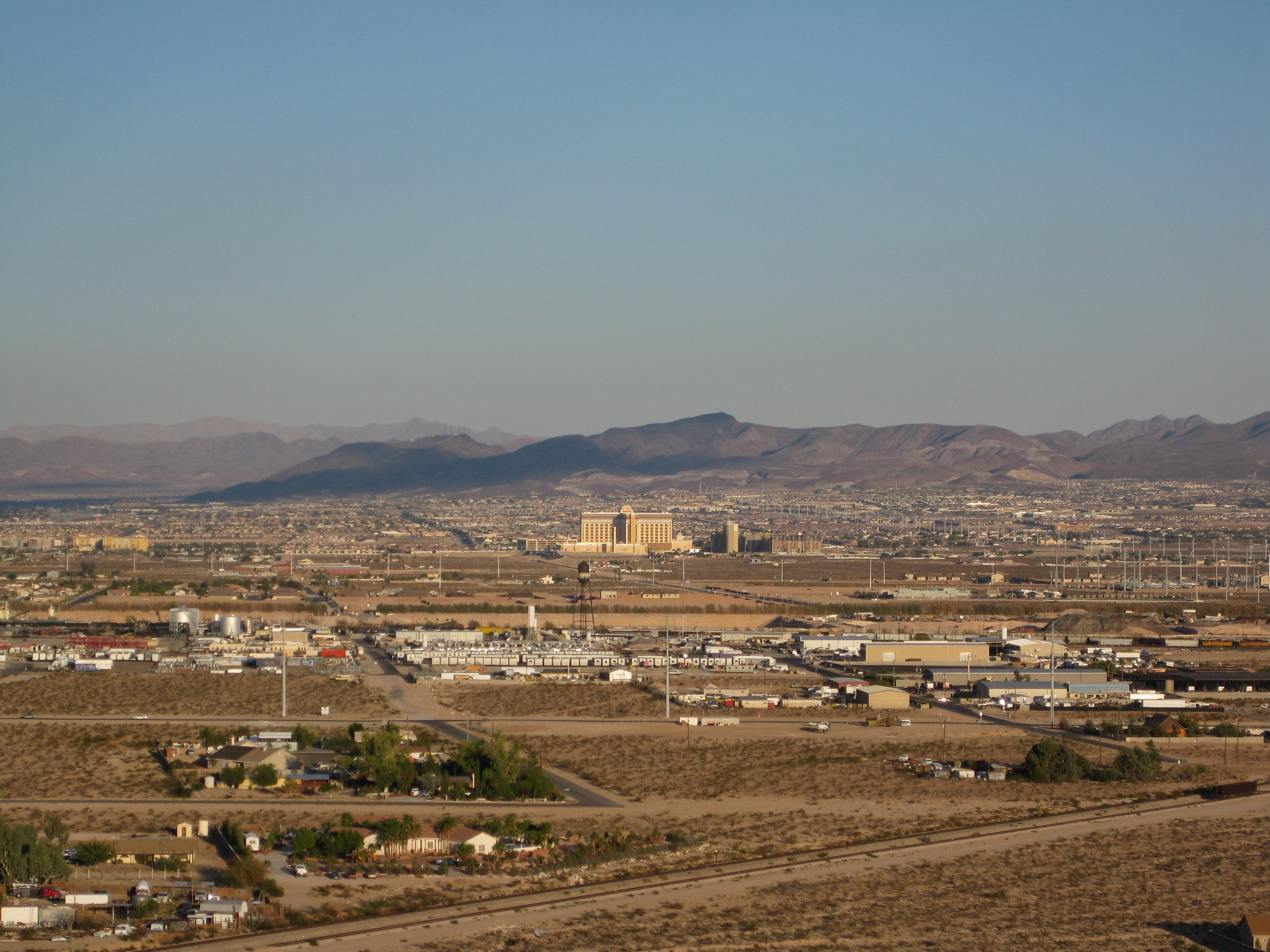
- View of Arden from the west, with Henderson in the distance.

- Location within Nevada
- Coordinates: 36°01′05″N 115°13′48″W
- Country: United States
- State: Nevada
- County: Clark
- Founded: 1905; 121 years ago
- Named for: Arden
- Elevation: 2,484 ft (757 m)
- Time zone: UTC-8 (PST)
  - Summer (DST): UTC-7 (PDT)
- ZIP code: 89118
- GNIS feature ID: 838496

Arden, Nevada was an unincorporated community in Clark County, Nevada, United States. The area is now part of the town of Enterprise. Located about 7 miles (11 km) southwest of Las Vegas, the area is experiencing rapid growth in housing development on land formerly owned by the Bureau of Land Management.

== History ==
The San Pedro, Los Angeles and Salt Lake Railroad (later part of the Union Pacific Railroad) began operating through the area in 1905. The railroad's Arden station, located about 12 miles (19 km) south of Las Vegas, was named for Arden, the New York estate of E. H. Harriman, the railroad's co-owner. By 1906, Arden was serving as a shipping point for the Potosi mine.

The Arden post office was established in 1907. Around that time, William K. Moore, who has been credited as Arden's founder, discovered gypsum deposits in the nearby mountains. With financing from Southern California businessmen, Moore started the Arden Plaster Company, which opened a mill at the site in 1908. It was reported to be the second largest gypsum plant in the country. A narrow-gauge railroad was constructed to connect the plant to the gypsum mine, 5 miles (8.0 km) away.

The plaster plant burned down in 1912, but was quickly rebuilt. In 1919, it was purchased by the United States Gypsum Company. The plant was closed and dismantled in 1930 due to a decline in the construction industry.

A railroad spur line was built in 1925 to connect Arden to the Blue Diamond Mine, 11 miles (18 km) to the northwest.

A gravel pit was established at Arden in the mid-1950s, and operated until 1978, growing to 160 acres (65 ha) in size. A commercial operation has since resumed operations at the site.

Clark County built a fallout shelter at Arden in the 1950s or 1960s to house regional government leaders in case of an attack on Las Vegas. The shelter was maintained at least until the 1980s.

On April 21, 1958, United Airlines Flight 736, a Douglas DC-7 passenger aircraft with 47 aboard. crashed onto then-empty desert two miles SE of Arden after a mid-air collision with a United States Air Force F-100 jet fighter flown by two pilots. All 49 aboard the two aircraft were killed.

The Arden post office was closed in 1971. In 1981, Arden was reported to have around 40 residents.
