= Rhodes Ranch =

American planned community

Coordinates: 36°02′39″N 115°17′14″W

Rhodes Ranch golf course in 2006

Rhodes Ranch is a master-planned community and golf course located in Spring Valley, Nevada, approximately six miles southwest of the Las Vegas Strip. It was developed by Jim Rhodes. The community was announced in 1996, after Rhodes gained 1,330 acres (540 ha), some of it through the Bureau of Land Management. At the time, much of the surrounding area was rural, and nearby residents opposed the development of the land. Despite the opposition, the Rhodes Ranch project was approved and began construction.

The Rhodes Ranch Golf Club opened to the public on November 6, 1997. The course is 162 acres (66 ha), and was designed by Ted Robinson. Rhodes Companies filed for Chapter 11 bankruptcy in 2009, and Rhodes Ranch was turned over to creditors. Dunhill Homes was subsequently chosen to continue development of the community. Century Communities purchased it in 2014.

== History ==
=== Planning and opposition ===
Rhodes Ranch was developed by Jim Rhodes, who acquired 950 acres (380 ha) of land from the Bureau of Land Management (BLM) in March 1996. The site was located in the southwest Las Vegas Valley. The land was appraised at nearly $9 million, and Rhodes purchased smaller properties in the area for $8 million, forming a contiguous parcel totaling 1,330 acres (540 ha). The proposed site for Rhodes Ranch was located several miles outside of development boundaries that had been set by the Clark County Commission. The nearest sewer and water lines were miles away, presenting an infrastructure issue. Rhodes ultimately had to run pipelines eight miles to reach the new community.

When Rhodes Ranch was announced in 1996, the area was rural and largely undeveloped. Residents in the area had concerns about the Rhodes Ranch project and how quickly it was proceeding. Rhodes initially sought zoning approval for 15,000 homes, retail and commercial space, and a casino. A total of 137 residents signed a petition for the county to designate the area as a rural preservation site, restricting homes to half-acre lots. Rhodes sought to annex portions of the proposed land into the Spring Valley Township, which would make planning easier while also negating the possibility of rural preservation status.

Some complained that the Clark County Planning Commission granted a six-month permit for Rhodes to operate a gravel pit in the area even though zoning changes had yet to be approved for Rhodes Ranch. Approximately 145 residents appealed the permit for gravel mining in the area, which was meant to help prepare the land for a Rhodes Ranch golf course. In June 1996, the Clark County Commission postponed a decision on the gravel pit for three months, following the opposition from residents. The commission also allowed a two-week period for residents to review the Rhodes Ranch conceptual plan. Commissioner Bruce Woodbury believed that the project was proceeding too quickly: "We were told that not too long ago the application for the land was just privatized, and here they are already moving forward on a batch plant and massive development. We see all over the county a gradual expansion (of development), but this is not a gradual expansion. This is very rapid, massive development. The word leapfrog comes to mind." The commission approved the concept plan later in the month, without the support of Woodbury. A study would be undertaken to determine issues such as roads and sewage lines.

Rhodes ultimately received permission to process 250,000 tons of gravel at the site, on the condition that roads be paved by a certain date to prevent dust from being raised into the air. Because of an error, Rhodes had gained the right to sell sand and gravel located on the property after he acquired it. Residents subsequently sued Rhodes and the BLM for the loss of money in gravel and sand sales. The commission approved the final master plan in October 1996, with Woodbury casting the sole vote of opposition, saying the project was too large for the area. Rock blasting was necessary to prepare the land for construction, and nearby residents complained of dust from the blasting. Air-quality officials prohibited construction crews from performing blasts on weekends and holidays, a decision that pleased local residents and that would prolong the construction period. Residents later complained about late-night noises and bright lights, both a result of the gravel pit operations.

Residents continued to oppose the project. Despite the opposition, a development agreement was approved in December 1996. Simultaneously, the Clark County Commission approved a petition creating the unincorporated town of Enterprise, Nevada. The commission also approved the annexation of the Rhodes Ranch property from Enterprise into Spring Valley. The property consisted of five square miles totaling 1,372 acres (555 ha). Woodbury and Enterprise residents opposed the annexation, which was proposed by commissioner Erin Kenny, a future resident in Rhodes Ranch.

In early 1997, the Clark County Board of Commissioners granted approval of final maps for two residential subdivisions, to be built by Rhodes Design and Development. The subdivisions would contain 29 acres (12 ha) each. Construction of the golf course was underway later that year.

=== Opening and ownership changes ===
Rhodes Ranch Golf Club in 2006

A lake near the community entrance

The Rhodes Ranch Golf Club opened on November 6, 1997, with little fanfare. It was designed by Ted Robinson, and was open to the public. The 135-acre course featured eight lakes, and was the centerpiece of the Rhodes Ranch community. The course was later increased to 162 acres (66 ha), and it includes more than 3,500 palm trees. The community's entrance includes a "Rhodes Ranch" sign spelled out in giant letters like the Hollywood Sign. Rhodes Ranch became one of the most successful master-planned communities in the Las Vegas Valley.

In 1999, Rhodes Design and Development Corporation proposed a hotel-casino for Rhodes Ranch, with 1,040 rooms, a shopping center, movie theaters, and a bowling alley. The following year, Rhodes sold property in Rhodes Ranch to Station Casinos, which has had plans for years to eventually construct a hotel-casino known as Durango Station.

Construction of new homes continued into 2000. At the time, approximately 700 homes had been built in the community. Rhodes Design and Development sought to relocate a proposed drainage ditch so it would be built directly outside of the Rhodes Ranch project, rather than on-site. The company said the proposed relocation was sought for the sake of aesthetics, denying that additional homes would be built on the land. Residents and the county had concerns about the cost of relocating the ditch and the impact it could have on the design plans for a nearby school and park. The presence of a drainage ditch would reduce the value of the property by $186,000, and Rhodes had been opposed to the ditch since 1997.

During 2000, commissioner Kenny, a friend of Rhodes, arrived unexpectedly at a staff member meeting to advocate for the relocation of the drainage ditch. Staff members later said they felt intimidated by Kenny to approve the relocation. County planners requested that Rhodes pay the cost of the relocation in the event that it were approved. With Kenny's help, Rhodes won county approval for the proposal and was given three months to make the relocation happen. However, after months of meetings, the county decided to keep the ditch on Rhodes' property. The county compromised with Rhodes and agreed to make the flood channel more narrow than previously planned.

A 23-acre shopping center was added in 2004, to keep up with growing demand for retail and commercial space. As of 2005, most of the golf course's clientele consisted of locals, with tourists accounting for the remaining 40 percent. Around that time, home prices at Rhodes Ranch averaged between $370,000 and $1 million.

Rhodes Companies filed for bankruptcy in 2009. At the time, Rhodes Ranch was still being built out. The community had 314 finished home lots available for purchase, and another 1,993 undeveloped lots. Jim Rhodes had an option to purchase the golf course for $5.9 million as part of the bankruptcy reorganization plan. The course was worth an estimated $8 million. Creditors led by Credit Suisse were owed $370 million, and they took over control of Rhodes Ranch in January 2010. Dunhill Homes, a newly formed company in Dallas, was named later that year to manage and further develop Rhodes Ranch. As of 2012, the golf course hosted approximately 65,000 rounds a year.

Century Communities purchased Dunhill Homes and acquired Rhodes Ranch in 2014. By the end of 2015, Century Communities had more than 500 home lots left to develop at Rhodes Ranch, expected to take three years to construct and sell. In 2017, Century Communities launched an effort to sell the golf course, which was struggling financially. Later in the year, the company proposed building 32 homes on six acres (2.4 ha) of the golf course, reducing its par from 72 to 71. The proposal received opposition from residents. However, when the residents were given the option to buy out the remaining six acres from Century Communities, through their Home Owners Association, they voted unanimously to have the remaining six acres developed into homes instead of increasing their monthly dues.

== Education ==
Before Rhodes' acquired the land for Rhodes Ranch, the Clark County School District had held 70 acres (28 ha) through BLM. The school district agreed to give up its property for the Rhodes Ranch project on the condition that 10 acres (4.0 ha) be set aside for a possible future school, although Rhodes Ranch was initially being planned as an adults-only community. The Clark County Commission later exempted Rhodes from donating property to the school district, although by 1998, Rhodes had started selling homes to families of all ages, without notifying the county or donating land for new schools.

By 2004, there had three years' worth of meetings between Rhodes representatives and school district officials to determine an appropriate site for a school. Rhodes Ranch had 500 elementary school-age children as residents, and more than 1,000 were expected to reside there upon full completion. Children in Rhodes Ranch attended nearby schools, but the district stated that the community had enough elementary students to warrant a new school site. However, Rhodes had been hesitant to give up property for a school, instead suggesting eight nearby BLM sites, all of which were rejected by the school district. The district wanted a school site within safe walking distance, as school buses were not permitted to travel through the private streets of Rhodes Ranch. Rhodes had set aside a 10-acre (4.0 ha) property for a school as a last resort option, but preferred to save the land for more homes.

In June 2004, the Clark County Commission declined to approve permits for any new homes in Rhodes Ranch until a suitable site could be provided to the school district. The district and Rhodes Homes reached a tentative agreement for a school site shortly thereafter. The site was located just outside Rhodes Ranch, on BLM land. The property had no water access, but Rhodes agreed to spend up to $10 million to build the necessary infrastructure, including a pump station. Rhodes believed that the pump station could be finished in 2007, for a school opening that year. However, there were concerns from the Las Vegas Valley Water District that three years would not be an adequate amount of time for construction of the pump station. After several more delays, the county gave approval to the proposed school site in October 2004. The Forbuss Elementary School opened as scheduled in 2007.
