= Ted Robinson (golf course architect) =

American golf course architect (1923–2008)

- Born: May 17, 1923; Long Beach, California
- Died: March 2, 2008 (aged 84); Laguna Beach, California
- Education: University of California, Berkeley; University of Southern California, masters, 1948
- Occupation: Architect
- Spouse: Bobbi Robinson
- Children: 3
- Practice: Golf Course Architect
- Projects: Sahalee Country Club, Sammamish, Washington Chapparal Country Club, Palm Desert, California

Theodore G. Robinson (May 17, 1923 – March 2, 2008) was an American golf course architect.

Born in Long Beach, California, Robinson was an undergraduate at the University of California, Berkeley and received a master's degree in planning from the University of Southern California in 1948. He established his golf course architecture practice in 1954 and continued working there for over fifty years. Robinson joined the American Society of Golf Course Architects (ASGCA) in 1973, served as president from 1983 to 1984, and ascended to ASGCA Fellow in 1995.

Robinson designed over 160 golf courses in his career, mostly in the western United States (including Hawaii), Mexico, Japan, South Korea, and Indonesia. He was one of the first golf course architects to promote the use of water as a significant hazard, incorporating waterfalls and other large green-side water features in his designs. This work led to his nickname of "King of Waterscapes."

Robinson died at age 84 in Laguna Beach after battling pancreatic cancer. His son, Ted Jr., continues to run his father's golf design firm.

== Selected Golf Courses (New) ==
- Lake Lindero Golf Course - Agoura Hills, California (1967)
- Chapparal Country Club - Palm Desert, California (1980)
- Desert Springs Golf Club - JW Marriott Desert Springs Resort, Palm Desert, California (1986)
- Experience at Koele -Lanai, Hawaii (1990)
- Fairbanks Ranch Country Club - Fairbanks Ranch Country Club, San Diego, California (1984)
- Lakewood Country Club - Oiso Machi, Japan (1970, 1973)
- Lewis River Golf Course - Woodland, Washington (1969)
- Marrakesh Country Club - Palm Desert, California (1969)
- Menifee Lakes Country Club - Menifee, California (1989)
- National Golf Club - Fort Washington, Maryland (1965)
- Old Ranch Country Club - Seal Beach, California (1967)
- Pinx Country Club - Jeju Island, Korea
- Rancho Murieta South Course - Rancho Murieta, Sacramento County, California (1979)
- Rhodes Ranch Golf Club - Spring Valley, Nevada (1997)
- Rolling Hills Country Club - Rolling Hills Estates, California (1969)
- Sand Canyon Country Club - Santa Clarita, California (with son Ted Jr.) (1999)
- Sahalee Country Club - Sammamish, Washington (1969), hosted the PGA Championship in 1998
- Seven Lakes Golf & Country Club - Palm Springs, California (1963)
- Simi Hills Golf Course - Simi Valley, California (1981)
- The Fountaingrove Club - Santa Rosa, California (1985)
- Sunset Hills - Thousand Oaks, California (1962)
- Tijeras Creek Golf Club - Rancho Santa Margarita, California (1990)
- Tuscany Golf Club - Henderson, Nevada (2003)
- Tustin Ranch Golf Club - Tustin, California (1989)
- North Ranch Golf Course - Westlake Village, California (1974)
- Westlake Golf Course - Westlake Village, California (1964)

== Selected Golf Courses (Renovation) ==
- El Dorado Park, Long Beach, California,1962
- Hacienda Golf Club, La Habra Heights, California, 1965
- Everett Golf & Country Club, Everett, Washington, 1969
- Los Coyotes Country Club, Buena Park, California,1970
- Navy Golf Course, Cypress, California, 1970
- Candlewood Country Club, Whittier, California, 1971
- La Jolla Country Club, La Jolla, California, 1973
- Riverwalk Golf Club(formerly known as Stardust), San Diego, California, 1976
- Palos Verdes Golf Club, Palos Verdes Estates, California, 1977
- Alondra Park Golf Course, Lawndale, California, 1978
- Pauma Valley Country Club, Pauma Valley, California, 1983
- Indian Wells Country Club, Indian Wells, California, 1984
- Rancho Bernardo Inn, Rancho Bernardo, California, 1984
