= Blue Diamond Mine =

Mine in Nevada

Coordinates: 36.085°N 115.407°W

- Interactive map of Blue Diamond Mine

Location
- Location: Clark County, Nevada, United States

The Blue Diamond Mine and mill is a gypsum production facility at Blue Diamond Hill in Clark County, Nevada. The mine was initially owned by a Los Angeles company known as Blue Diamond, which began mining the land in 1925. An on-site processing plant was added in 1941, followed a year later by the construction of a nearby company town, known as Blue Diamond, Nevada. The mine was eventually sold to James Hardie Gypsum, which expanded operations in 1998. BPB took over the gypsum factory a few years later, and developer Jim Rhodes purchased 2,400 acres in 2003.

== History ==
In 1924, the Blue Diamond company of Los Angeles purchased a 1,000-acre site for $75,000, and began mining its large deposit of gypsum. The site posed various obstacles for the development of a mining operation, including cost. There were no roads leading to the area, and there was no railroad connection leading to the Union Pacific line in nearby Arden, Nevada. A railroad spur line was built to connect the mine to Arden, located about 11 miles southeast. Quarry equipment and the construction of employee housing put the total project cost at more than $1 million. The mine opened in 1925. The initial production capacity was approximately 200 tons per day, a figure that was gradually increased with equipment improvements. Open-pit and underground mining took place at the site.

In 1941, Blue Diamond added a processing plant on-site for the gypsum, which had previously been processed in Los Angeles. Gypsum was mined at the top of Blue Diamond Hill and was transported by tram to the area below, where it was processed. The Blue Diamond Corporation subsequently built a company town in 1942, named Blue Diamond, Nevada. The mine, plant, and mill were expanded over the next decade. As of 1954, it had 325 employees. Gypsum is extracted from the upper portion of the Permian Kaibab Formation. The gypsum layer is on the westward slope of Blue Diamond Hill.

=== Ownership changes ===
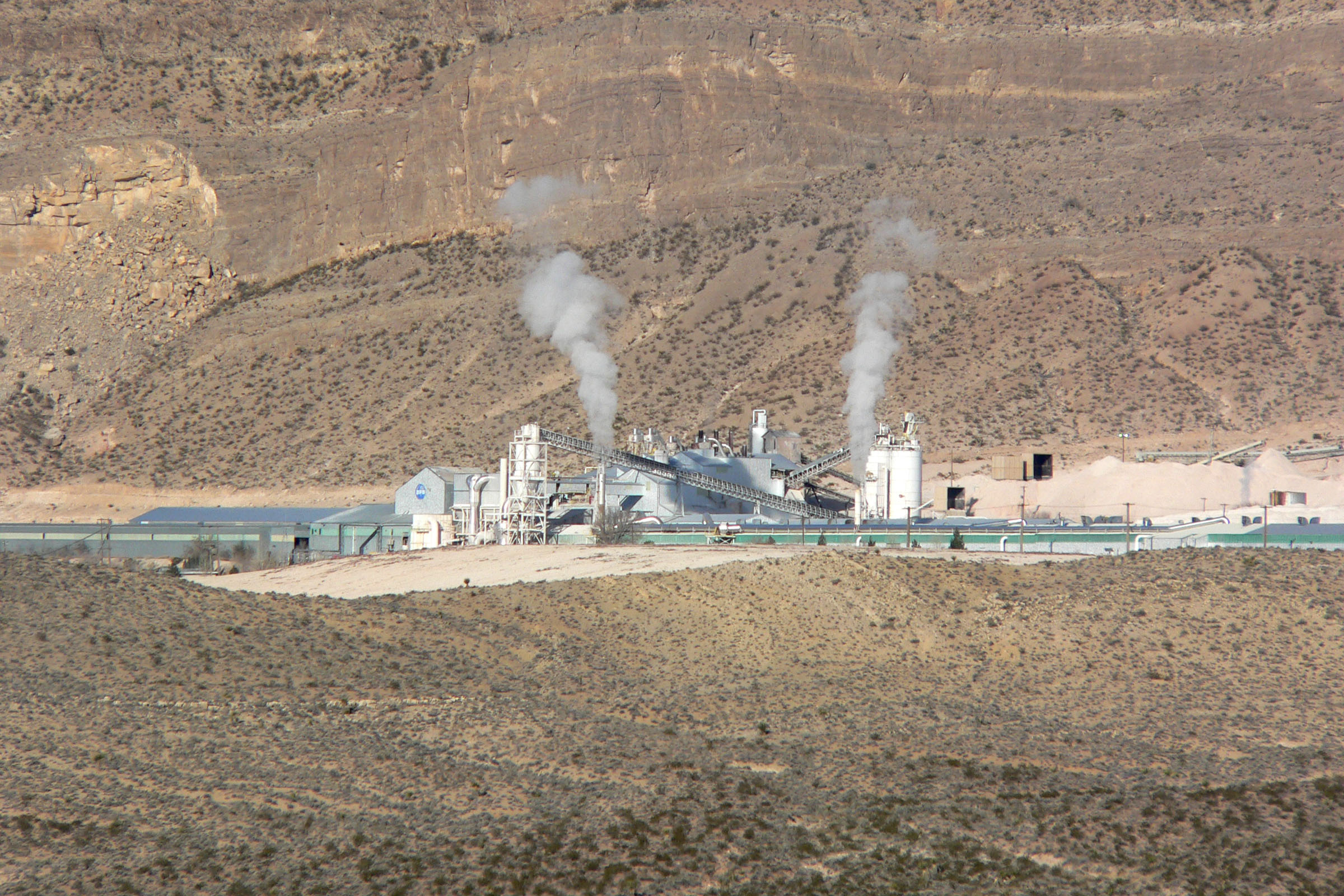
BPB's gypsum operation in 2007

James Hardie Gypsum eventually purchased the mine, and expanded operations there in 1998. It had 150 employees by the end of the decade. In 1999, James Hardie put 2,700 acres of its mine land up for sale, at a price of $45 million. In 2002, BPB agreed to purchase James Hardie's gypsum factory, located at the bottom of Blue Diamond Hill. Meanwhile, John Laing Homes was planning a purchase of approximately 2,000 acres atop Blue Diamond Hill, part of James Hardie's mining operation. John Laing planned to build a residential community on the land, but later withdrew its proposal amid opposition.

In 2003, developer Jim Rhodes purchased 2,400 acres from James Hardie. Rhodes also intended to develop a residential project on the land, and he launched tours of the mining operation hoping to win public support for the project. Rhodes argued that housing would be a better use of the land, rather than the continuation of mining. Rhodes' mining operation closed in 2005.

As of 2008, BPB operated a processing plant at Blue Diamond Hill, for gypsum that was shipped in from Arizona. Rhodes' residential project received opposition, and he resumed gypsum mining on his property around 2011, while still trying to get the housing proposal approved. As of 2014, he was selling approximately 1 million tons of gypsum each year through his company, Gypsum Resources. In 2018, Rhodes sold 1,375 acres in mining claims to a Denver company. Gypsum Resources filed for Chapter 11 bankruptcy in 2019.
