= Blue Diamond, Nevada =

Census-designated place in Clark County, Nevada, United States

- Census-designated place
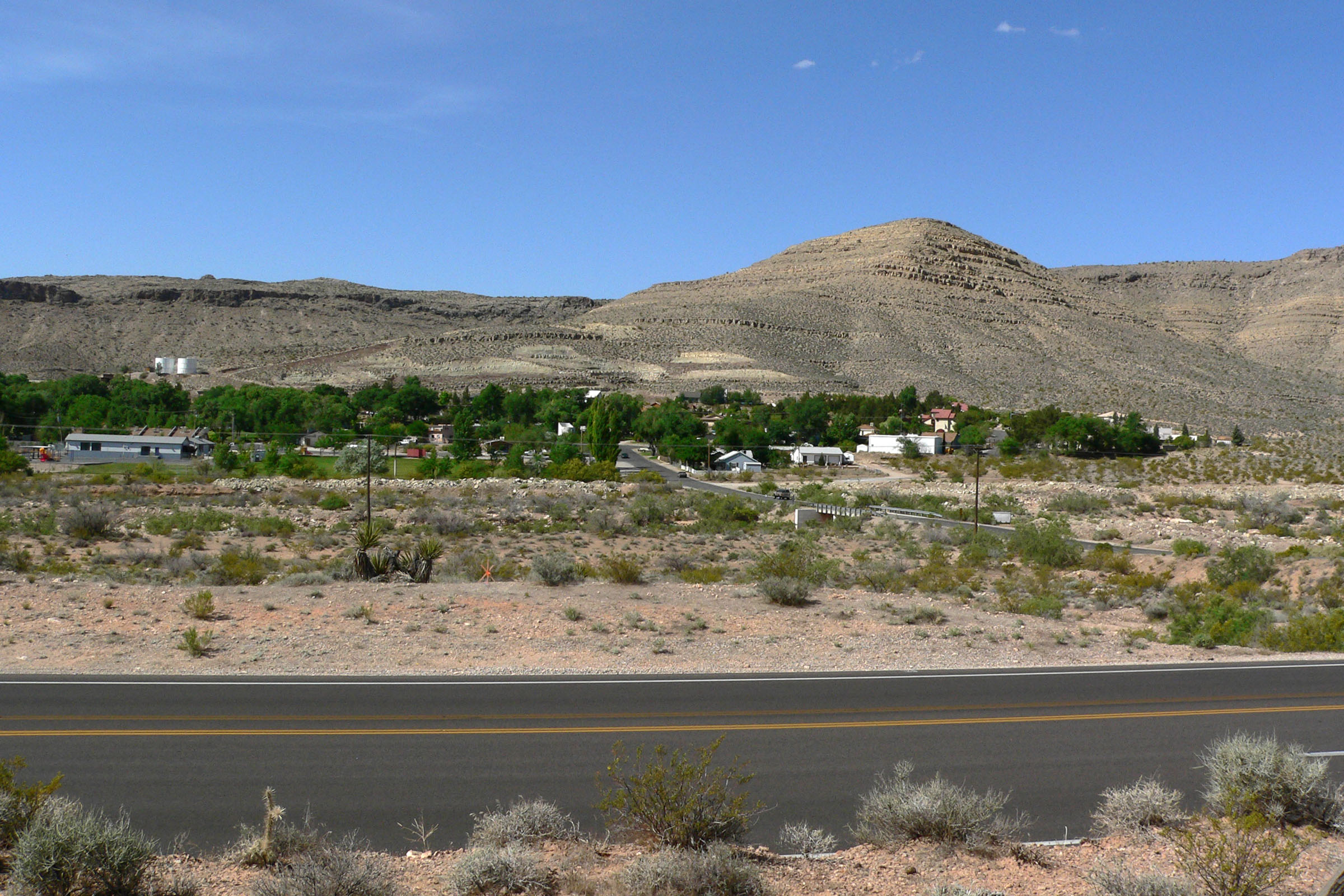

- Location of Blue Diamond in Clark County, Nevada

- Location in the United States
- Coordinates: 36°02′24″N 115°24′46″W
- Country: United States
- State: Nevada
- County: Clark

Area
  - Total: 7.22 sq mi (18.69 km^{2})
  - Land: 7.22 sq mi (18.69 km^{2})
  - Water: 0 sq mi (0.00 km^{2})
- Elevation: 3,708 ft (1,130 m)

Population (2020)
  - Total: 268
  - Density: 37.1/sq mi (14.34/km^{2})
- Time zone: UTC-8 (PST)
  - Summer (DST): UTC-7 (PDT)
- ZIP code: 89004
- Area codes: 702 and 725
- FIPS code: 32-05700
- GNIS feature ID: 2407866

Blue Diamond is a census-designated place (CDP) in Clark County, Nevada, United States. The population was 268 at the 2020 census.

== Description ==
The community includes a park, private pool, library, elementary school, event hall, church, and mercantile / gas station. The mercantile (general store) was built in 1942 and originally sold household staples and sundries to residents who were mostly miners at the Blue Diamond Mine. The store has maintained its original external look. Walls inside the store showcase many of the town's historical photos, courtesy of the Blue Diamond Historical Society, a 501c3 all-volunteer organization.

== History ==
Blue Diamond is the site of Cottonwood Spring (formerly known as Ojo de Cayetana, or Pearl Spring), a watering place and campsite on the Old Spanish Trail and the later Mormon Road between Mountain Springs and Las Vegas Springs. The springs are located on a mountainside south of the town at 36°02′44″N 115°24′22″W at an elevation of 3409 feet.

The nearby gypsum mine was purchased in 1923 by the Blue Diamond Corporation of California. The company opened a wallboard manufacturing plant at the site in 1941, and then began building a company town in 1942. The village of Cottonwood became known as Blue Diamondville that year, when a post office opened under that name. The name was changed to Blue Diamond later in the year, although some authorities continued to refer to it as Blue Diamondville until at least 1950.

== Demographics ==
Historical population
Census	Pop.	Note	%±
2020	268		—
U.S. Decennial Census

As of the census of 2000, there were 282 people, 118 households, and 77 families residing in the CDP. The population density was 38.3 inhabitants per square mile (14.8/km^{2}). There were 125 housing units at an average density of 17.0 per square mile (6.6/km^{2}). The racial makeup of the CDP was 94.33% White, 0.35% Native American, 1.42% Asian, 0.35% Pacific Islander, 0.35% from other races, and 3.19% from two or more races. Hispanic or Latino of any race were 1.42% of the population.

There were 118 households, out of which 28.0% had children under the age of 18 living with them, 48.3% were married couples living together, 13.6% had a female householder with no husband present, and 33.9% were non-families. Of all households 25.4% were made up of individuals, and 5.9% had someone living alone who was 65 years of age or older. The average household size was 2.39 and the average family size was 2.85.

In the CDP, the population was spread out, with 19.9% under the age of 18, 6.4% from 18 to 24, 26.6% from 25 to 44, 36.2% from 45 to 64, and 11.0% who were 65 years of age or older. The median age was 43 years. For every 100 females, there were 104.3 males. For every 100 females age 18 and over, there were 101.8 males.

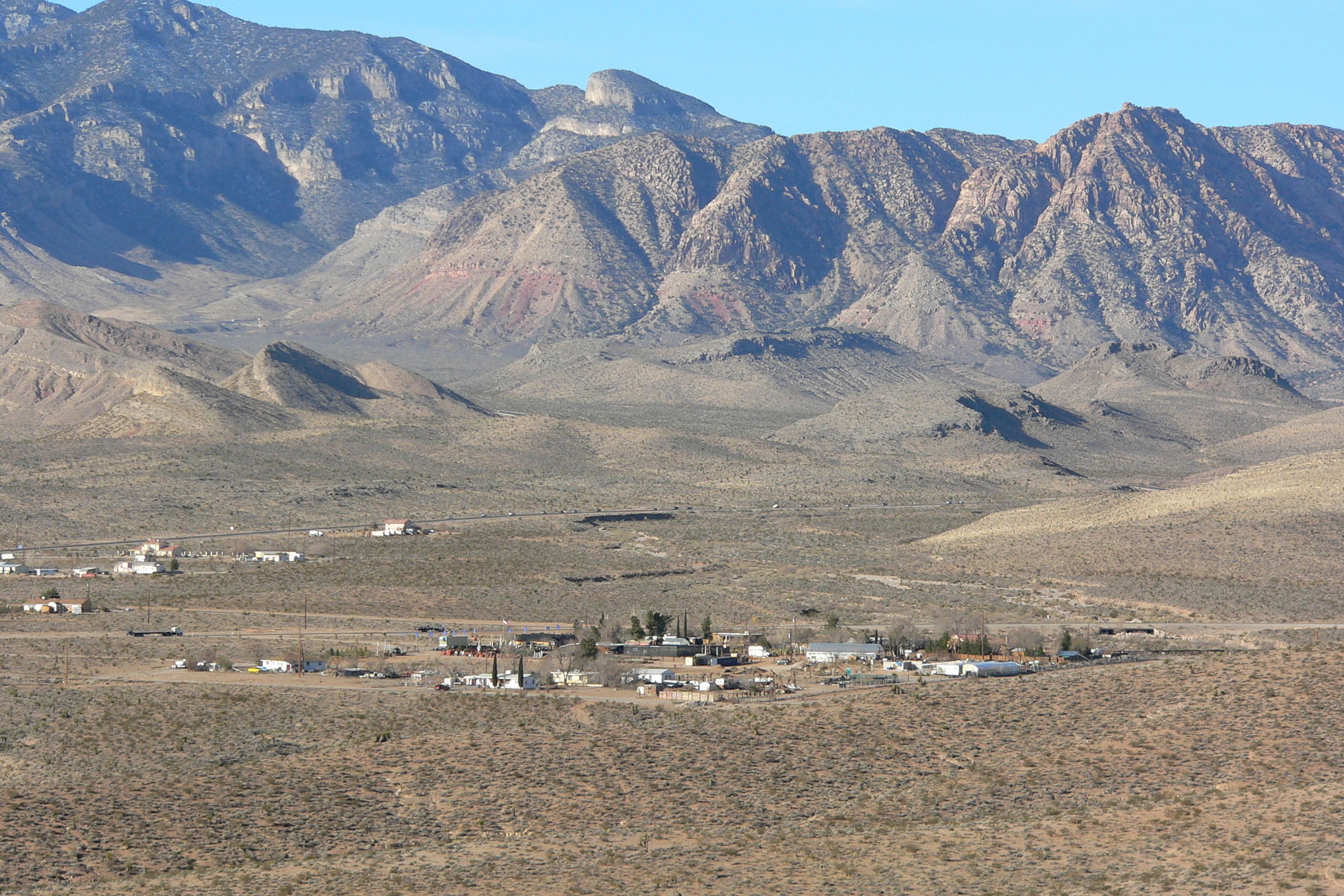
Cactus Joe's Blue Diamond Nursery, 2007

The median income for a household in the CDP was $54,091, and the median income for a family was $54,432. Males had a median income of $47,604 versus $47,692 for females. The per capita income for the CDP was $30,479. About 15.9% of families and 7.2% of the population were below the poverty line, including 21.2% of those under the age of 18 and none of those 65 or over.

== Education ==
Blue Diamond has a public library, a branch of the Las Vegas-Clark County Library District.

== See also ==
- List of census-designated places in Nevada
