= Century Communities =

Home construction and real estate development company

Century Communities, Inc.
- Trade name: Century Communities
- Type: Public
- Traded as: NYSE: CCS
- Industry: Home construction Real estate development
- Founded: 2002; 24 years ago
- Founder: Dale Francescon; Robert J. Francescon
- Headquarters: 8390 East Crescent Parkway, Suite 650, Greenwood Village, Colorado, United States
- Area served: United States
- Key people: Dale Francescon (Executive Chairman); Robert J. Francescon (CEO and President)
- Revenue: ▼US$4.118 billion (2025)
- Operating income: ▼US$210.8 million (2025)
- Net income: ▼US$147.6 million (2025)
- Total assets: ▼US$4.460 billion (2025)
- Total equity: ▼US$2.592 billion (2025)
- Subsidiaries: Inspire Home Loans; Parkway Title; IHL Home Insurance Agency; IHL Escrow
- Website: centurycommunities.com

Century Communities, Inc. is an American home construction and real estate development company headquartered in Greenwood Village, Colorado.

It has been publicly traded on the New York Stock Exchange since 2014.

== History ==
Century Communities was founded in 2002 by brothers Dale and Robert J. Francescon as a developer of single-family homes, townhouses, and condominiums.

In 2013, Century Communities raised US$240 million through a private offering to support expansion and expanded its operations to Texas through the acquisition of Jimmy Jacobs Homes in Austin and San Antonio.

In June 2014, Century Communities completed its initial public offering (IPO) on the New York Stock Exchange. Following the IPO, it acquired Dunhill Homes' Las Vegas operations, Houston-based Grand View Builders, and Atlanta-based Peachtree Communities.

In 2016, Century Communities acquired a 50 percent stake in North Carolina-based Wade Jurney Homes, expanded its operations to Salt Lake City, founded Inspire Home Loans for mortgage, Parkway Title for title, and IHL Insurance Agency for insurance services. In 2017, it merged with UCP, Inc. in a US$336 million transaction, and expanded into California and the Pacific Northwest. In November 2017, it acquired Lynnwood homebuilder Sundquist Homes. By the end of that year, Century Communities was operating 117 active communities across 10 states.

In 2018, Century Communities acquired the remaining interest in Wade Jurney Homes and renamed it as Century Complete in 2020. In 2021, Century Communities expanded to the Phoenix metropolitan area, North Florida, and Kentucky, beginning with communities in the Louisville metropolitan area. By 2022, Century Communities had also launched Century Living, a multifamily division focused on apartment development, and was ranked as the ninth-largest homebuilder in the United States by volume.

In 2024, Century Communities expanded its footprint in Nashville through the acquisition of Landmark Homes of Tennessee, and later that year acquired Anglia Homes. In August 2024, it acquired a 100-acre site near Fulshear, Texas. In 2025, it acquired the land of Chiles Ranch in Davis, California.

In 2025, Century Communities was recognized as one of the “Best Companies to Work For” by U.S. News & World Report. In 2026, the company was ranked in the top 10 of the Builder 100 list for the eighth consecutive year. It was also named one of America’s Most Trustworthy Companies by Newsweek for the fourth consecutive year, the only home builder to earn this distinction.

== Philanthropy ==
In 2022, Century Communities established the Century Communities Foundation to support charitable initiatives in the communities in which it operates. As of 2024, the foundation reported disbursing over $300,000 to nonprofit organizations such as the American Heart Association, the ALS Association, Operation Homefront, and HopeKids. In May 2024, the company participated in a partnership with the Houston Texans, Howard Hughes Holdings, the Greater Houston Builders Association, and Operation Finally Home to provide a mortgage-free home to U.S. Army veteran Joanna Ellenbeck and her family in The Woodlands Hills near Houston, Texas.

The company also supports employee volunteer efforts through its Century Cares program.
