= Nevada State Route 169 =

State highway in Nevada, United States

State Route 169
- Logandale Road; Moapa Valley Boulevard; Northshore Road
- State Route 169, highlighted in red

Route information
- Maintained by NDOT
- Length: 18.598 mi (29.931 km)
- Existed: July 1, 1976–present

Major junctions
- South end: Northshore Road in Lake Mead National Recreation Area
- North end: I-15 near Moapa Valley

Location
- Country: United States
- State: Nevada
- County: Clark

Highway system
- Nevada State Highway System; Interstate; US; State; Pre‑1976; Scenic
← SR 168	→ SR 170

State Route 169 (SR 169) is a state highway in Clark County, Nevada, United States. It connects the northern reaches of Lake Mead National Recreation Area to Interstate 15 (I-15) via Moapa Valley and the communities of Overton and Logandale. It is also called Northshore Road, Moapa Valley Boulevard, and Logandale Road.

== Route description ==
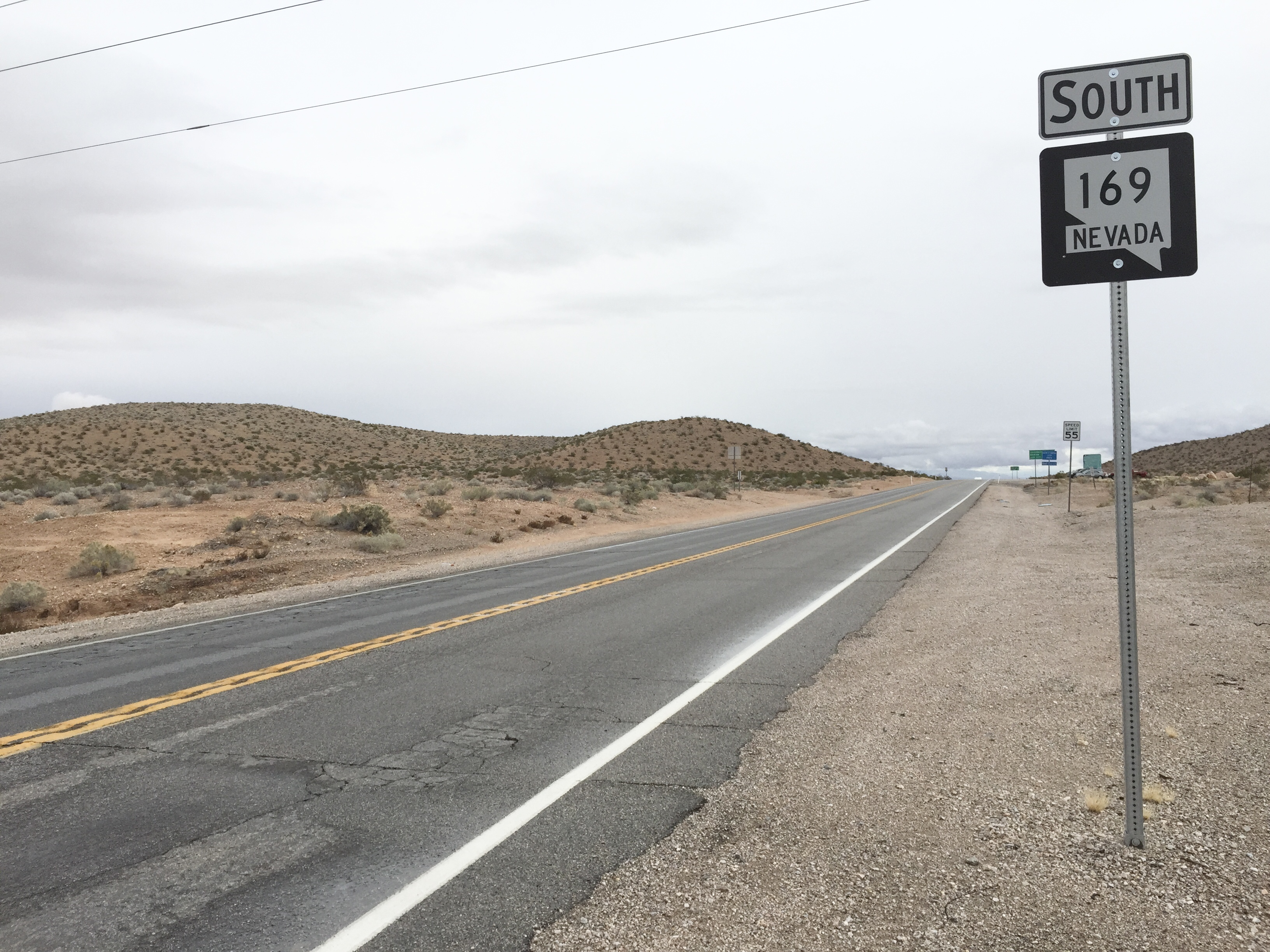
View from the north end of SR 169 looking southbound as seen in 2015

State Route 169 begins approximately 1.5 miles (2.4 km) north of the intersection of Northshore Road and Valley of Fire Road, at the northern boundary of the Lake Mead National Recreation Area. From this point, SR 169 winds northward approximately 5 miles (8.0 km) before entering the rural town of Overton and becoming Moapa Valley Boulevard. On the southern outskirts of Overton, the route passes by the Lost City Museum, a historical landmark built on the site of an Anasazi village called Pueblo Grande de Nevada that was estimated to have been settled circa 300–500 BC. As SR 169 travels northward through Overton, it forms the main road through the rural town while paralleling a Union Pacific railroad line to the west and the Muddy River to the east. The route transitions into the town of Logandale, winding its way northwestward as the main thoroughfare through the rural community. After traveling about 10 miles (16 km) through Overton and Logandale, the route runs through open desert terrain another 3.5 miles (5.6 km) to reach its terminus at exit 93 on Interstate 15 approximately 26 miles (42 km) west-southwest of Mesquite.

== History ==
SR 169 was previously designated State Route 12

A road appearing in the approximate alignment of SR 169 appears on official state highway maps as early as 1933. This road, designated State Route 12 proceeded southerly from U.S. Route 91 (US 91) (now I-15) through Logandale and Overton and southeasterly to the former town of St. Thomas a total distance of 20 miles (32 km) and then easterly crossing the Virgin River towards the Arizona state line over a distance of 18 miles (29 km). The portion between US 91 and Logandale was paved by 1935, with pavement reaching Overton the next year. By 1937, the completion of Hoover Dam and subsequent creation of Lake Mead caused the town of St. Thomas to be submerged and also resulted in SR 12 being severed into two pieces by the filling lake. The eastern end of SR 12 was removed from maps by 1940, leaving a 24-mile (39 km) paved route from Lake Mead (near the St. Thomas site) to US 91.

SR 12 remained unchanged for many years after this. On July 1, 1976, the Nevada Department of Transportation began an effort to renumber its state highways. During this process, the SR 12 designation along Logandale Road was proposed to be combined with the SR 40 designation along Valley of Fire Road to create a new State Route 169, leaving the roughly 3-mile (4.8 km) southeastern edge as SR 12. This new highway designation was first seen on state highway maps in 1978. However, it appears that ultimately the SR 40 section was not included in the new route designation—the present-day SR 169 alignment appears on the 1982 map while the Valley of Fire Road and southernmost miles of SR 12 were left without new state route numbers.

== Major intersections ==
The entire route is in Clark County.

Location	mi	km	Destinations	Notes
Lake Mead National Recreation Area	5.82	9.37	Northshore Road	Continuation beyond southern terminus
	24.31	39.12	I-15 – Las Vegas, Salt Lake City	I-15 exit 93
1.000 mi = 1.609 km; 1.000 km = 0.621 mi
