= Saint Joseph, Nevada =

- Ghost town
- Location within the state of Nevada Saint Joseph, Nevada (the United States)
- Coordinates: 36°34′22″N 114°26′59″W
- Country: United States
- State: Nevada
- County: Clark
- Elevation: 1,352 ft (412 m)
- Time zone: UTC-8 (Pacific (PST))
  - Summer (DST): UTC-7 (PDT)
- GNIS feature ID: 851285

Saint Joseph is a ghost town in Clark County, Nevada, that was located on the east bank of the Muddy River west of the north end of the Perkins Field in the Moapa Valley.

== History ==
Saint Joseph was established in 1865, on the east bank of the Muddy River, five miles north of Overton, Nevada. The settlement was named for Joseph W. Young, one of the colonists and a son of Brigham Young. Its post office in Paiute County, Arizona, was established on August 26, 1867. Saint Joseph was burned down in 1868 and its original site was abandoned. The population, post office and the town name moved to the settlement of West Point, which is now Logandale, Nevada.

The new Saint Joseph, like the other Mormon settlements in the Moapa Valley, was abandoned in 1871 due to a tax dispute with the state of Nevada. Its post office closed in October 1871. However, it became active again in May 1876. Following the Mormon return to Overton in 1880, in November 1883, the post office operations were closed at Saint Joseph and moved to Overton.

== Today ==
The site of the original Saint Joseph is barren.
