= Clark County Fair and Rodeo =

Annual rodeo

- Genre: Rodeo
- Begins: April
- Ends: April
- Frequency: Annual
- Locations: Logandale, Nevada, U.S.
- Inaugurated: 1965
- Website: www.ccfair.com

Clark County Fair and Rodeo is in Logandale, Nevada, next to Grant M. Bowler Elementary School in Clark County, Nevada. It is an annual fair and rodeo.

== History ==
The fair started in Moapa Valley in 1965 as the Moapa Valley Fair; it was held in the Overton Community Center. The fair relocated to its current Logandale site in 1988. The fair was small in the beginning but grew slowly. At different years, a carnival midway, livestock show, and rodeo were added. At its current location in Moapa Valley, the fair gained 190 acres to operate in. In 1986, they renamed the fair to "Clark County Fair". Then the fair growth increased. Many types of new buildings were added. In 1997, the rodeo had become extremely popular, causing the fair to change its name again, to its current name of "Clark County Fair and Rodeo". Annual attendance averages around 80,000 guests.

== About ==
It is held in early to mid April every year, bringing thousands of people to the small town of Logandale. Logandale is located in Moapa Valley along with Moapa, and Overton. Since 2002, the Las Vegas Metropolitan Police Department enhances security at the fair. The last fair was held in 2019 due to the COVID-19 pandemic, and returned in 2022 after a two-year hiatus.

== Events ==
The fair consists of such events as rodeos, festivals, 4-H programs, concerts, and other recreational programs; such as arts and crafts, pig racing, mutton bustin', and big game raffle. The rodeo is a full Professional Rodeo Cowboys Association (PRCA) event that includes with more than $250,000 in prizes. There is bareback riding, steer wrestling, team roping, saddle bronc riding, tie-down, bull riding, and barrel racing. Growney Brothers Rodeo of Red Bluff, California stock contractors and a handful of others bring livestock for the rodeo.
