= Belvedere Apartments (Salt Lake City) =

Historic residential building in Salt Lake City, Utah, US

- U.S. National Register of Historic Places
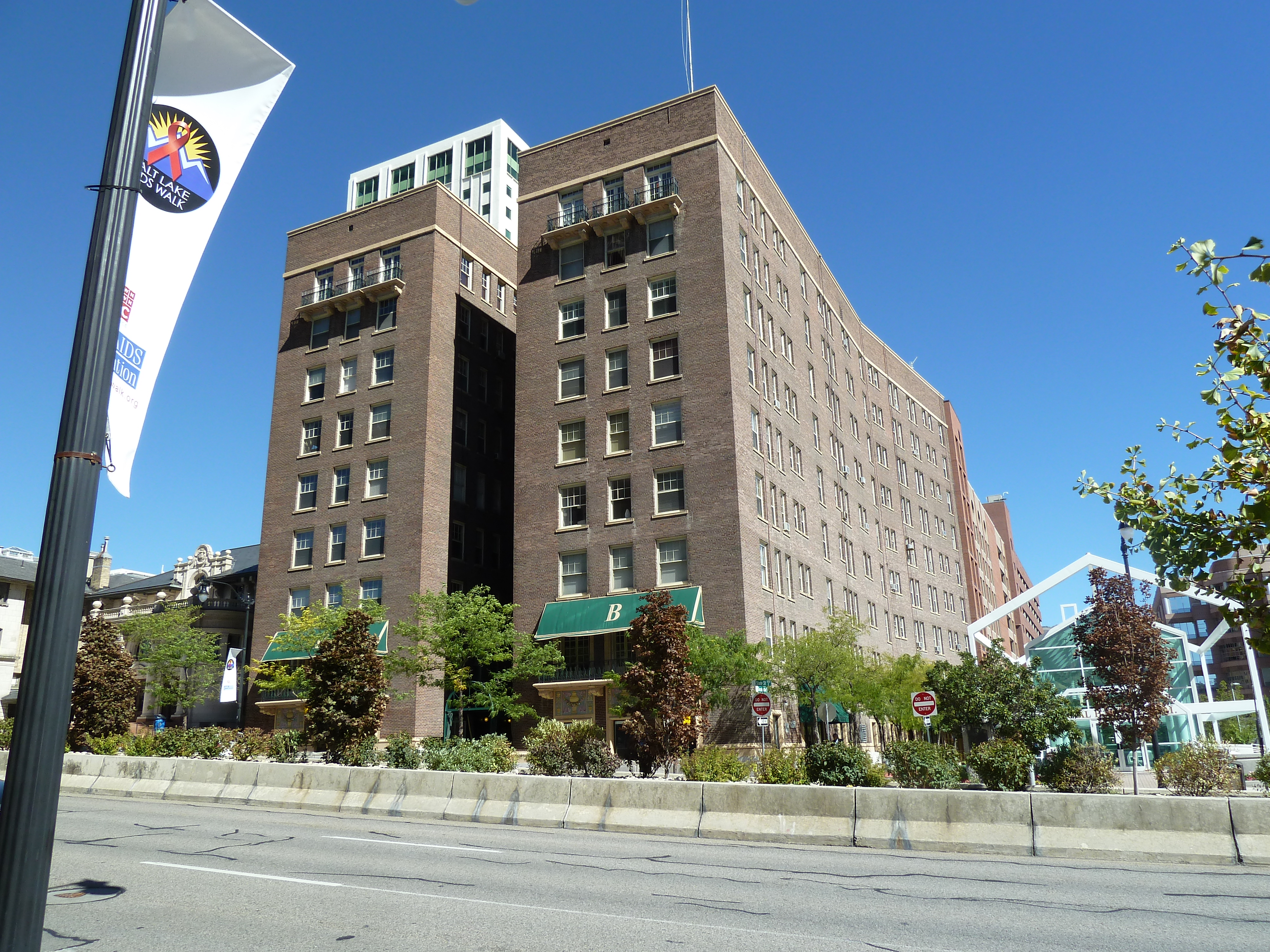
- As seen from across State Street in 2014

- Location within Utah
- Location: 29 S. State Street; Salt Lake City, Utah
- Coordinates: 40.768525°N 111.887951°W
- Built: 1918–1919
- Architect: Miller, Woolley and Evans
- MPS: Salt Lake City MPS
- NRHP reference No.: 12000271
- Added to NRHP: May 8, 2012

The Belvedere Apartments (currently The Belvedere or simply the Belle) is a historic residential building in downtown Salt Lake City, Utah. Opened as an "apartment hotel" in 1919, the structure was constructed by the Church of Jesus Christ of Latter-day Saints (LDS Church) and leased to James T. Keith to operate. In 1951, the church traded the building in exchange for multiple properties to the north of Temple Square. The apartments were again sold in 1978 and developed into condominiums.

== Design ==
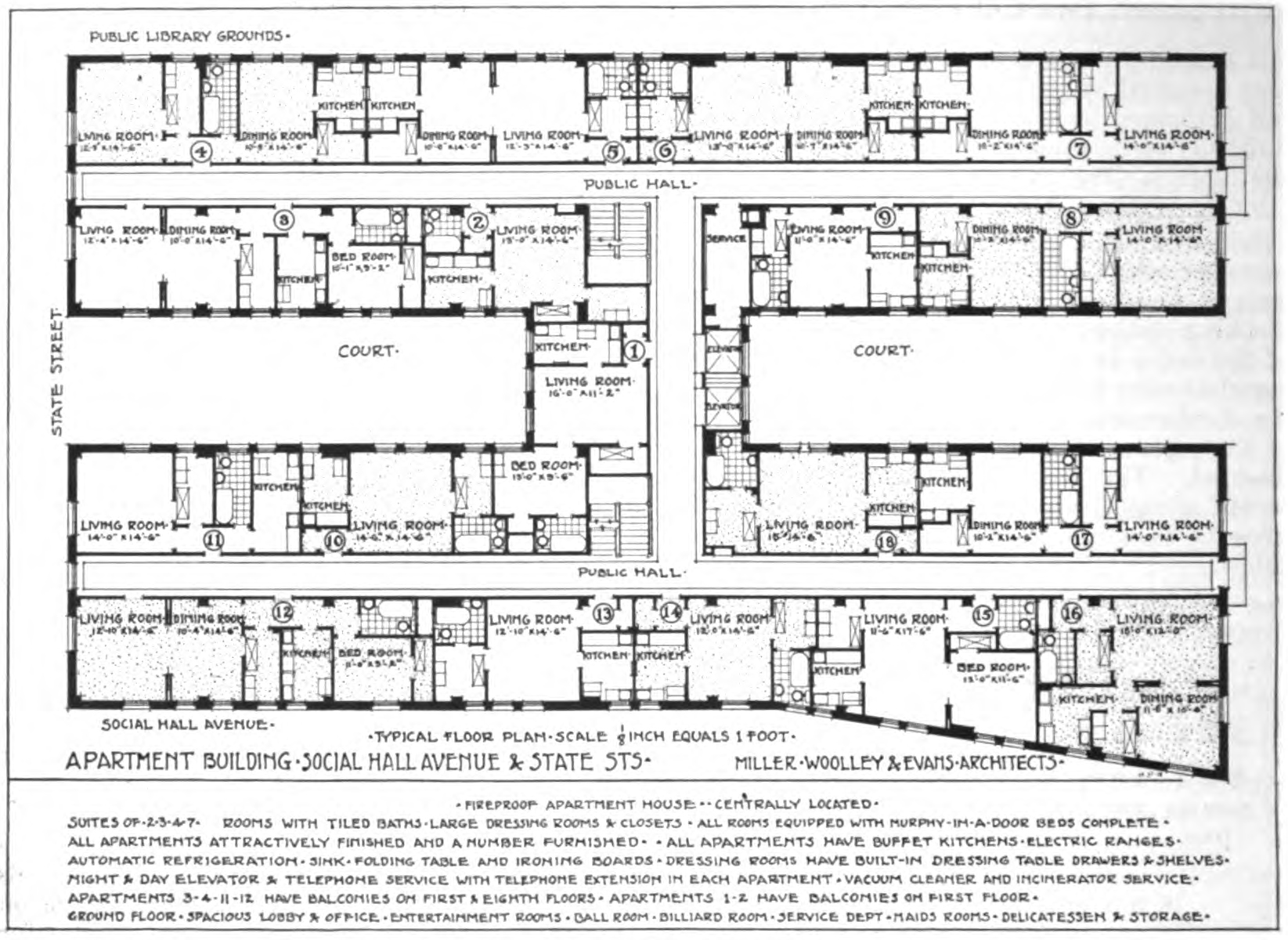
Typical floor plan at the time of the building's opening in 1919

The building is nine stories high, consisting of a north and south wing with a cross bar connecting the two (forming an H-shaped floorplan). The ground level contains commercial space for offices and, historically, stores. The exterior is brick with ornamental terracotta detailing at the foundation, second level balconies and the ninth level balconies. Designed by Miller, Woolley and Evans, the stylistic details and features do not fit any recognized architectural style.

The structure is the tallest example of historic urban apartments in Salt Lake City.

== History ==
In March 1917, the LDS Church announced it would construct an elaborate apartment house near Social Hall Alley, on property recently acquired from Dr. James T. Keith, a local dentist and real estate developer. A few weeks later, the church also announced that Social Hall Alley would be expanded to a full-sized street and new buildings would be constructed for automobile dealers, garages and repair shops. The historic Social Hall would also be demolished as part of the redevelopment of the area. This transformation of the alley into 'Auto Row' was the idea of Dr. Keith. As initial plans were further developed, changes were made, such as saving the Social Hall and the exact location of the apartment house.

At its opening in fall 1919, the apartment hotel was leased to Dr. Keith's investment company. It included upscale amenities such as doormen, elevator and switchboard operators, and room service. Although advertised as an "apartment hotel" the 144 units functioned almost exclusively as apartments.

In December 1951, the church announced it was trading the apartment hotel with the Joseph William Taylor Company, in exchange for several properties just north of Temple Square. These properties included the Grand Central Market, New Ute Hotel and the Joseph William Taylor Memorial Mortuary. In April 1978, Thompson Michie Associates, Inc. purchased the Belvedere from the Taylor Company, with the intent to convert the apartment hotel into condominiums. The grand opening for the newly converted condominiums was held September 10–15, 1979.

== See also ==
- National Register of Historic Places listings in Salt Lake City
