= L.D.S. Ward Building =

- U.S. National Register of Historic Places
- Location within Idaho
- Location: 187 S. 2nd Ave., Lava Hot Springs, Idaho
- Coordinates: 42°37′04″N 112°00′51″W
- Area: less than one acre
- Built: 1933
- Architect: Miles E. Miller
- Architectural style: Tudor Revival
- NRHP reference No.: 99001474
- Added to NRHP: December 9, 1999

The L.D.S. Ward Building in Lava Hot Springs, Idaho was built in 1933. It was listed on the National Register of Historic Places in 1999.

It was deemed significant "as an excellent example of early 20th century Tudor Revival design" and as "a significant work of a regionally important master architect, Miles E. Miller of Salt Lake City".

It served as the church building for the Church of Jesus Christ of Latter-day Saints (L.D.S.) local ward (parish/congregation).

It is a one-story, Tudor Revival style building with an L-shaped plan. It is built of ashlar limestone upon a high poured-in-place concrete foundation.

It has a cedar roof, coming to ends at three gables, each including detailing of half-timbering and plaster. One of the gables is clipped like a jerkinhead. It has a rear courtyard from which a large limestone chimney rises.

It was sold by the L.D.S. ward in 1996; the new owners renamed it as Greystone Manor and reopened it as a bed and breakfast and wedding chapel and reception venue. It is still in operation as that in 2019.

The building has also served as a community center, such as for a pumpkin-carving festival in 2012.

It is located at 187 S. 2nd Ave. in Lava Hot Springs.
