= Lava High School Gymnasium =

- U.S. National Register of Historic Places
- Location within Idaho Location within the United States
- Location: 202 W. Fife, Lava Hot Springs, Idaho
- Coordinates: 42°37′00″N 112°00′52″W
- Area: less than one acre
- Built: 1934
- Built by: Byrd Findlayson
- Architect: Miles E. Miller
- Architectural style: Classical Revival
- NRHP reference No.: 97000764
- Added to NRHP: July 9, 1997

The Lava High School Gymnasium, at 202 W. Fife in Lava Hot Springs, Idaho, was built in 1934. It was listed on the National Register of Historic Places in 1997.

It was built as a Public Works Administration project, as an expansion attached to the town's two-story high school building, built in 1911. The high school building was demolished in 1979 and students now attend a high school in Arimo, Idaho a few miles to the southwest. A one-story elementary school building replaced it; the gymnasium serves it instead, as well as occasionally hosting holiday events, sports programs, and school activities.

It is Classical Revival in style and was designed by Salt Lake City architect Miles E. Miller. And was built by contractor Byrd Findlayson. It was deemed an "excellent local example of late-Classical Revival design that was extensively used for public architecture throughout the United States during the 1930s."
