= LDS Moapa Stake Office Building =

Historic building in Nevada, US

- U.S. National Register of Historic Places
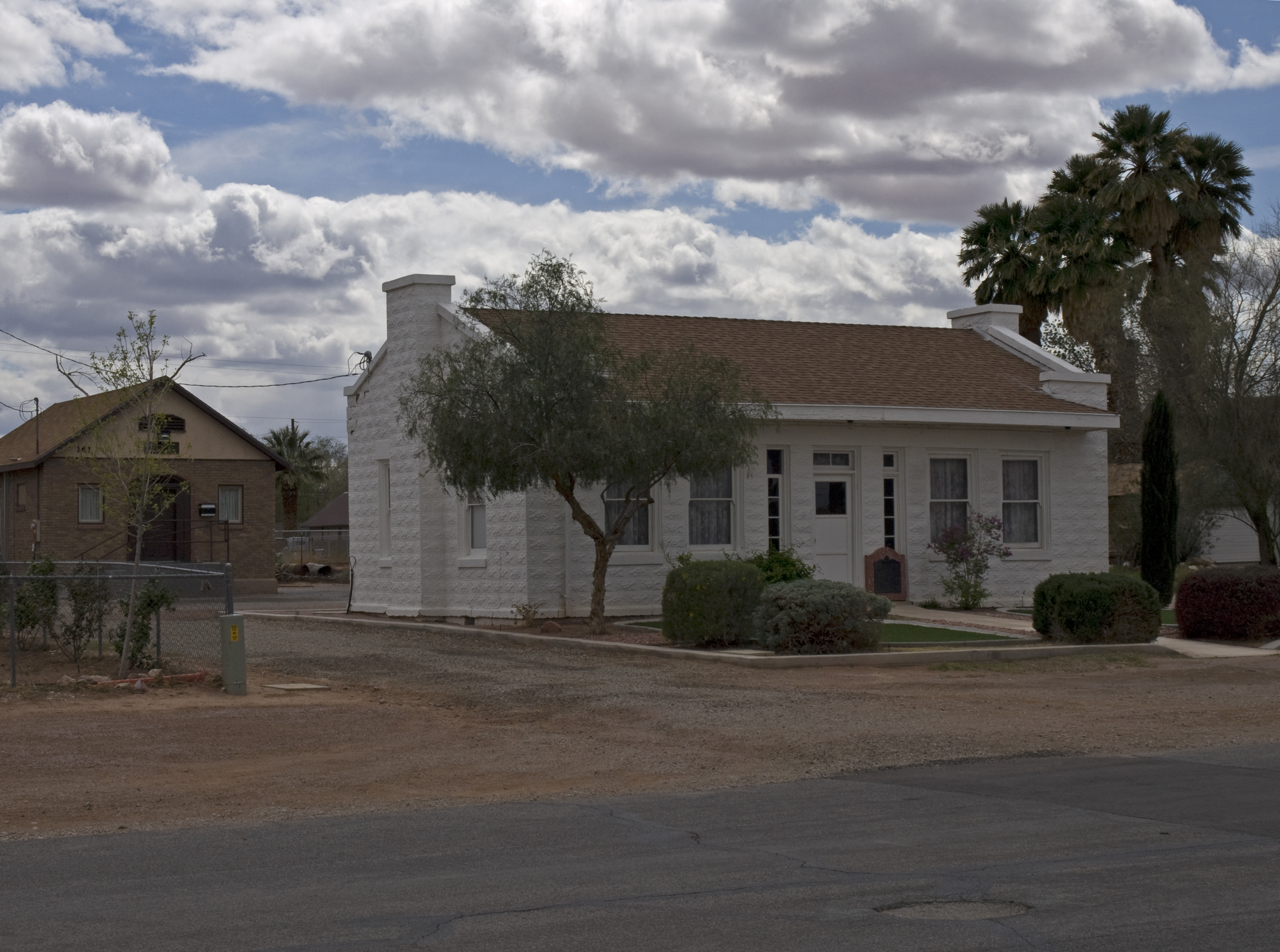
- Location: 161 W. Virginia Street; Overton, Nevada
- Coordinates: 36°32′25″N 114°26′39.69″W
- Built: 1917-1919
- NRHP reference No.: 02000819
- Added to NRHP: July 25, 2002

LDS Moapa Stake Office Building, also known as the Virmoa Maternity Hospital, is listed on the National Register of Historic Places in Overton, Nevada. It was built between 1917 and 1919 to serve the community of Moapa Valley as a local office, classroom and records repository for the LDS Church. In 1939, the local stake decided to relocate their offices to Las Vegas as travel between the communities became easier. The building then sat vacant.

In 1940, the Southern Nevada Memorial Hospital leased the building and converted it into a hospital which opened on January 9, 1941 as the Virmoa Maternity Hospital. The name "Virmoa" is a contraction of Virgin and Moapa. The hospital then was changed into an emergency room in the 1960s. In 1970, the emergency room closed and the Daughters of Utah Pioneers purchased the building for use as a meeting hall and museum. It was listed in the National Register of Historic Places for its association with the development of Moapa Valley as a religious and later a medical site.
