= St. Thomas Branch =

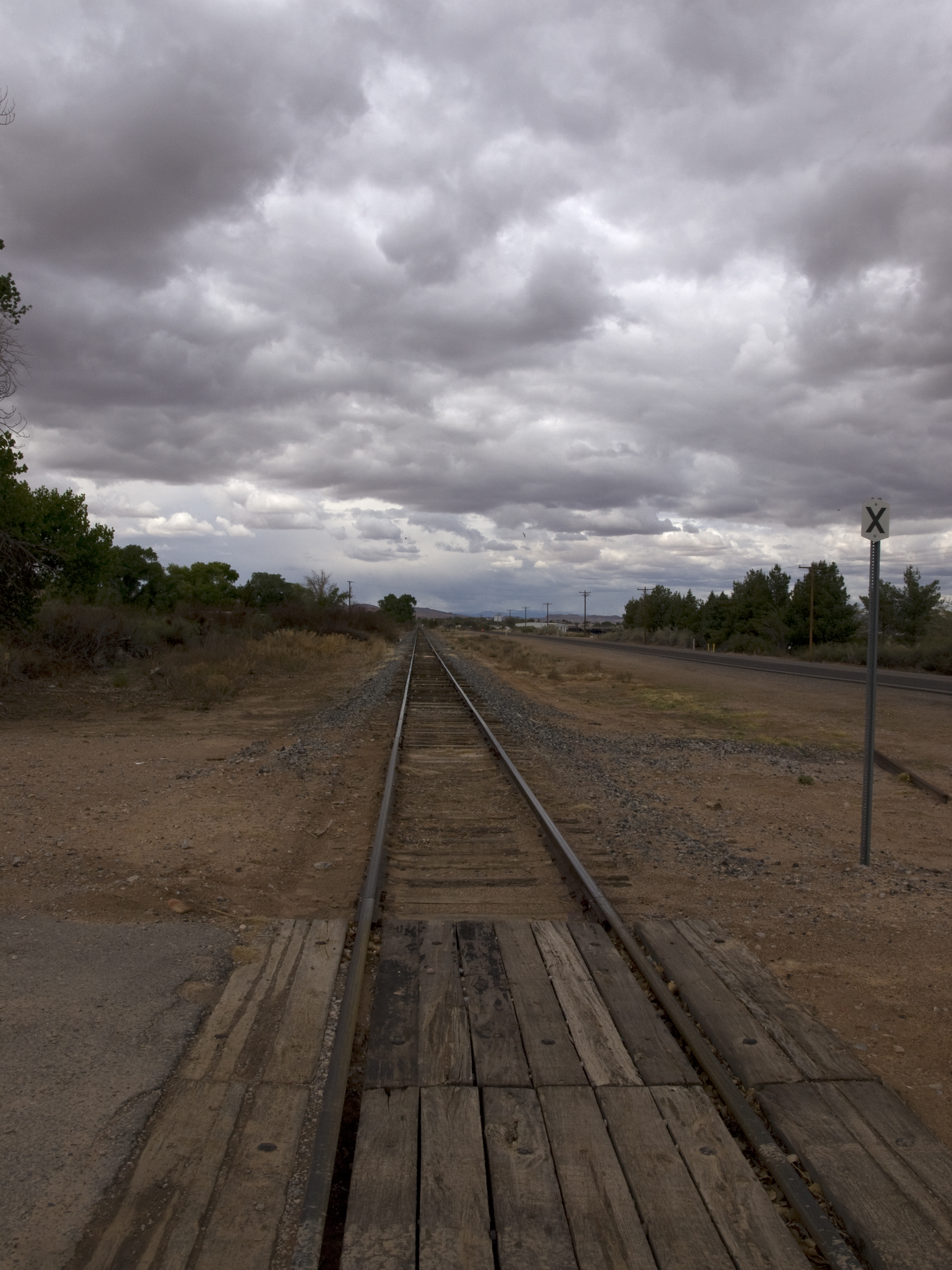
The St. Thomas Branch right of way in Overton

The St. Thomas Branch, also called the Mead Lake Branch, is a railway line in Nevada which runs through the Moapa Valley, connecting to the national railway system at Moapa, Nevada. It is a single track railway which runs for a length of 18 miles (29 km) rated at track class 2, rated for speeds of up to 25 miles per hour (40 km/h). It is owned by the Union Pacific Railroad, being a branch of the original Salt Lake Route. The first 5 miles (8.0 km) of tracks to the Narrows were completed in mid-1911, in time to transport the cantaloupe harvest that August. The full 21.3-mile (34.3 km) of the line to St. Thomas opened on June 7, 1912. Southern Pacific attempted to reduce passenger frequency to once per week in 1921, though were ordered by the Public Service Commission of Nevada to restore its previous six per week service the following year. Between 1938 and 1939, the last 6 miles (9.7 km) of the line were abandoned as the area was inundated by the recently filled Lake Mead.

The line served gypsum and plaster businesses in the area. Later traffic included silica and cement. As of 2021, Union Pacific runs trains over the branch two or three times per week.
