= Miles Miller =

American architect (1896–1956)

Miles E. Miller

Miles Miller (April 8, 1896 in Salt Lake City, Utah – March 28, 1956) was a 20th-century architect in Utah. He was a graduate of Latter Day Saint University and the University of Utah. He worked in a firm with Clifford Percy Evans and Taylor Woolley between 1917–1922 in Salt Lake City, Utah. Two of his works, the Parowan 3rd Ward Meetinghouse (1914) and Central Park Ward Chapel (1927), represent Prairie School architecture. He also designed the Carbon Stake Tabernacle which was completed in 1914 (demolished 1981).

Several of his works are listed on the National Register of Historic Places (NRHP).

== Works ==
- Parowan 3rd Ward Meetinghouse (1914)
- Carbon Stake Tabernacle (1914)
- Central Park Ward Chapel (1927)
- Mesquite High School Gymnasium (1939), in Mesquite, Nevada, (Miller, Miles M.), NRHP-listed
- L.D.S. Ward Building (1933), 187 S. 2nd Ave., Lava Hot Springs, ID. Tudor Revival (Miller, Miles), NRHP-listed
- Lava High School Gymnasium, 202 W. Fife, Lava Hot Springs, ID (Miller, Miles E.), NRHP-listed
- Overton Gymnasium, N. West Thomas St. W of jct. with S. Anderson St., Overton, NV (Miller, Miles), NRHP-listed
