= Pueblo Grande =

Pueblo Grande may refer to:

- Pueblo Grande Ruin and Irrigation Sites, an archaeological site and park in Phoenix, Arizona
- Pueblo Grande de Nevada, an archaeological site near Overton, Nevada
