= KDOX =

KDOX may refer to:

- KDOX (FM), a radio station (91.3 FM) licensed to serve Big Pine, California, United States
- KQLL, a radio station (1280 AM) licensed to serve Henderson, Nevada, United States, which held the call sign KDOX from 1998 to 2011
- The NEXRAD radar at Dover Air Force Base in Delaware.
