= Archie Butler (actor) =

American actor, crewman and stunt performer

- Born: Arch Brady Butler; September 27, 1911; Rhea County, Tennessee, U.S.
- Died: February 4, 1977 (aged 65); Overton, Nevada, U.S.
- Occupations: Actor, crewman, stunt performer
- Years active: 1936–1970

Arch Brady Butler (known professionally as "Archie Butler"; September 27, 1911 – February 4, 1977) was an American actor, crewman, and stunt performer.

== Biography ==
Butler was born September 27, 1911, in Rhea County, Tennessee, appeared in numerous moving pictures, particularly Westerns, in such films as Code of the West (1947), Annie Get Your Gun (1950), Westward the Women (1951), and The Wild Bunch (1969), and in such television shows as Bonanza, Gunsmoke, The Big Valley, The Rifleman, and The Virginian.

Butler died February February 4, 1977, aged 65, in Overton, Nevada.

== Partial filmography ==
- Under Two Flags (1936) - (uncredited)
- Wyoming (1940) - Cavalryman (uncredited)
- Barbary Coast Gent (1944) - Townsman (uncredited)
- West of the Pecos (1945) - Vigilante (uncredited)
- Code of the West (1947) - Cowboy (uncredited)
- Ambush (1950) - Trooper (uncredited)
- Annie Get Your Gun (1950) - Cowboy (uncredited)
- Westward the Women (1951) - Outrider (uncredited)
- Arena (1953) - Cowboy (uncredited)
- Ride, Vaquero! (1953) - Bandit (uncredited)
- Gypsy Colt (1954) - Farrier (uncredited)
- Man with the Gun (1955) - Henchman (uncredited)
- The Brass Legend (1956) - Deputy (uncredited)
- The Glory Guys (1965) - Trooper (uncredited)
- The Wild Bunch (1969) - Jabalai (uncredited)
