= Potosi, Venezuela =

Potosí Pueblo de Potosí
- Disestablished town
- Location within Venezuela
- Coordinates: 7°57′25″N 71°41′4″W
- Country: Venezuela
- State: Táchira
- Disestablished: 1985

Population
  - Estimate (2024): 0

Potosí was a Venezuelan town in the western state of Táchira. The town was deliberately flooded by the Venezuelan government in 1985 to build a hydroelectric dam. In 2010, the town was uncovered for the first time since its flooding due to a drought caused by the weather phenomenon El Niño.

== History ==
Prior to 1985, Potosí was a town of approximately 1,200 inhabitants. The then-president of Venezuela, Carlos Andres Perez, flew in by helicopter and announced that the town was to be evacuated and then flooded to build a hydroelectric dam. Josefa Garcia, a former resident, visited the town's square for the first time and remembered that day saying, "He said we'd all be expropriated and we had to leave. It took our hope away." Garcia relocated to a region not far from her former home and other former residents moved throughout Venezuela. The houses and the colonial church were abandoned and the waters of the Uribante Reservoir, once covering 20 square kilometres (7.7 sq mi), submerged the town with the exception of the steeple of its church. The steeple is 85 feet (26 m) feet tall and was once used as the high-water mark for the reservoir.

== Reemergence ==
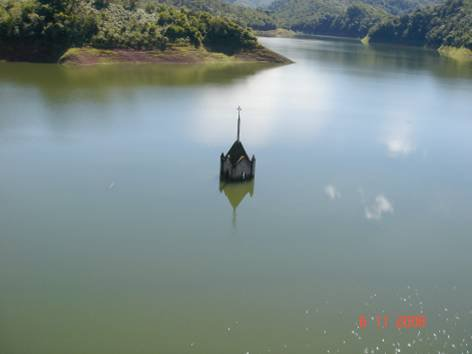
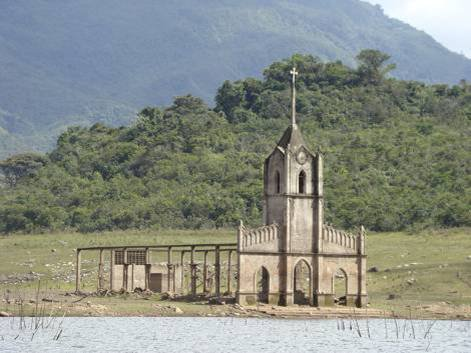
With a high water level, you can see the cross of the church of the old Potosi, however, due to the severe drought that suffered Venezuela in mid-2009-2010, one could see the whole church and the nearby cemetery.

After 26 years under water, there was a 98 feet (30 m) drop in the water level of the reservoir due to a drought. The church, grave markers, the ruins of houses and the outline of the former town square have reemerged with the church entirely exposed, although only its facade remains. Some visitors have appeared as well, including Garcia who once worked at the church there who commented, "It brings me joy, but it also makes me sad to see the situation that we're in." The 2009-10 El Niño event is believed to be responsible for the severe drought afflicting the region.

== See also ==
- St. Thomas, Nevada, United States: In 1938, St. Thomas, Nevada, was flooded following the construction of the Hoover Dam and has emerged from the waters of Lake Mead due to local droughts.
- The Edersee Reservoir in Hesse, Germany, which flooded three villages during its creation which can still seen when the water level is low.
