= KADD =

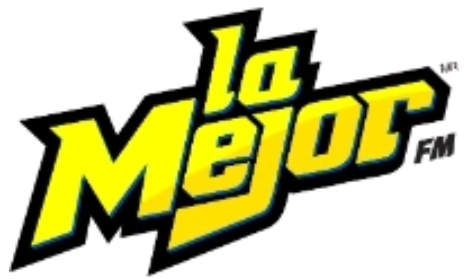
- Logandale, Nevada; United States
- Broadcast area: Las Vegas Valley; St. George, Utah
- Frequency: 93.5 MHz (HD Radio)
- Branding: La Mejor 93.5 FM

Programming
- Format: Regional Mexican
- Affiliations: MVS Radio

Ownership
- Owner: Eric Palacios; (Radio Activo 2 LLC)
- Sister stations: KXLI

History
- First air date: December 1997

Technical information
- Licensing authority: FCC
- Facility ID: 72528
- Class: C
- ERP: 93,000 watts
- HAAT: 637 meters (2,090 ft)
- Transmitter coordinates: 36°38′7″N 114°7′18″W
- Repeaters: 93.5 KADD-FM1 (North Las Vegas); 93.5 KADD-FM2 (Las Vegas); 93.5 KADD-FM3 (Henderson)

Links
- Public license information: Public file; LMS
- Webcast: Listen live Listen live (via iHeartRadio)
- Website: KADD Online

KADD (93.5 FM "La Mejor 93.5") is a commercial radio station broadcasting a Spanish-language Regional Mexican format. Licensed to Logandale, Nevada, it serves as a rimshot station in the Las Vegas Valley. The station is owned by Eric Palacios' Radio Activo Broadcasting, through licensee Radio Activo 2 LLC. The studios are on South Eastern Avenue in Las Vegas.

The transmitter is sited near Virgin Peak south of Bunkerville, Nevada. KADD is also relayed over three boosters: KADD-FM1 in North Las Vegas, KADD-FM2 in Las Vegas and KADD-FM3 in Henderson. Other boosters are near St. George, Utah.

== History ==
KADD signed on the air in December 1997. It was owned by William E. Fitts and it had a hot adult contemporary format.
