= Overton Gymnasium =

- U.S. National Register of Historic Places
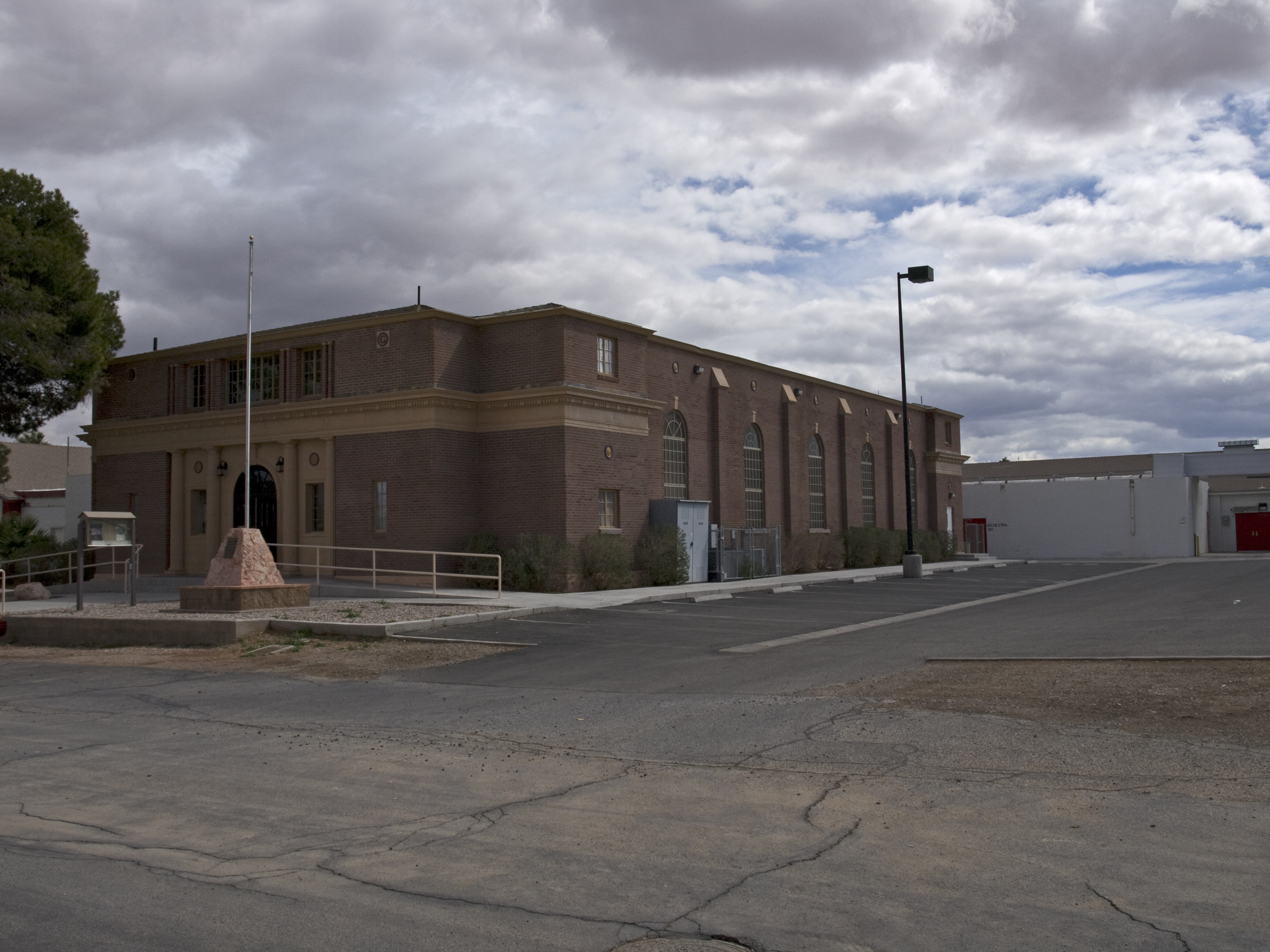

- Location within Nevada Location within the United States
- Location: N West Thomas St, W of junction with S Anderson St, Overton, Nevada
- Coordinates: 36°32′32″N 114°26′52.5″W
- Built: 1938
- Architect: Miles Miller
- Architectural style: Italian Renaissance Revival
- MPS: Historic School Buildings in the Evolution of the Fifth Supervision School District MPS
- NRHP reference No.: 92000118
- Added to NRHP: March 10, 1992

Overton Gymnasium is a historic gymnasium in Overton, Nevada. It was listed on the National Register of Historic Places in 1992.

The gymnasium was designed in the Italian Renaissance Revival style by Miles E. Miller in 1938-39 under the Public Works Administration program.
