= Mesquite High School Gymnasium =

- U.S. National Register of Historic Places
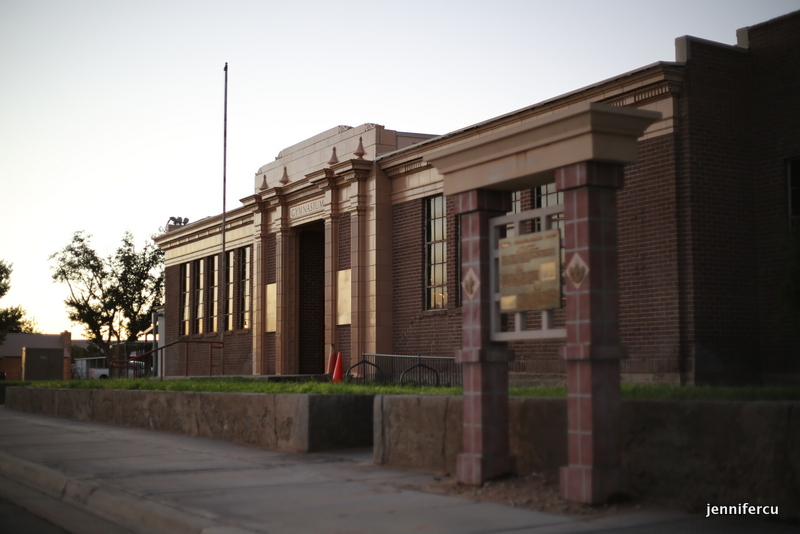

- Location within Nevada Location within the United States
- Location: 144 E. North First Street; Mesquite, Nevada
- Coordinates: 36.805603°N 114.067227°W
- Area: less than one acre
- Built by: Salznar-Thompson
- Architect: Miles M. Miller
- Architectural style: Italian Renaissance Revival
- MPS: Historic School Buildings in the Evolution of the Fifth Supervision School District MPS
- NRHP reference No.: 92000119
- Added to NRHP: March 10, 1992

The Mesquite High School Gymnasium, at 144 E. North 1st St. in Mesquite, Nevada, was built in 1939. It was listed on the National Register of Historic Places in 1992.

It was designed by Salt Lake City architect Miles M. Miller in Italian Renaissance Revival style. It was funded by the Public Works Administration and was built by contractor Salznar-Thompson.
