= Echo Bay Airport =

- IATA: none; ICAO: none; FAA LID: ØL9

Summary
- Airport type: Public
- Owner: Lake Mead National Recreation Area
- Serves: Overton, Nevada
- Elevation AMSL: 1,535 ft (468 m)
- Coordinates: 36°18′40″N 114°27′50″W

Map
- Location of airport in Nevada ØL9 (the United States)

Runways
Direction	Length		Surface
Direction	ft	m	Surface
6/24	3,400	1,036	Asphalt

Statistics (2011)
- Aircraft operations: 500
- Based aircraft: 1
- Source: Federal Aviation Administration

Echo Bay Airport (FAA LID: ØL9) is a public use airport owned by and located in the Lake Mead National Recreation Area. It is 14 nautical miles (26 km) south of the central business district of Overton, a town in Clark County, Nevada, United States. The airport is situated near Echo Bay on Lake Mead.

== Facilities and aircraft ==
Echo Bay Airport covers an area of 11 acres (4 ha) at an elevation of 1,535 feet (468 m) above mean sea level. It has one runway designated 6/24 with an asphalt surface measuring 3,400 by 50 feet (1,036 x 15 m).

For the 12-month period ending January 31, 2011, the airport had 500 general aviation aircraft operations, an average of 41 per month. At that time there was one single-engine aircraft based at this airport.

== See also ==
- List of airports in Nevada
