= Taylor Woolley =

American architect

Taylor A. Woolley (October 10, 1884 - February 2, 1965) was an American architect of the Prairie School modern architectural style.

== Early life ==
Woolley was born on October 10, 1884, to Taylor Harrar Woolley and Caroline L. Ahlstrom in Salt Lake City. Early in life, Woolley had an interest in building and construction, which led him to pursue a career in architecture.

== Training ==
Woolley received early professional training from the International Correspondence Schools and at the Salt Lake City architecture firm Ware & Treganza. He later continued his studies at the Chicago Art Institute. Woolley then worked as a draftsman to Frank Lloyd Wright in Prairie School architecture. Beginning 1909, Woolley traveled with Wright to Florence and Fiesole, Italy to work with Wright's son Lloyd Wright on the Wasmuth Portfolio, Wright's first published collection architectural drawings. He also worked for Wright in the Oak Park studio, and worked in the early stages on the famed Taliesin I.

== Career in Utah ==
Woolley was licensed as an architect in Utah in 1910, though he continued to work on commissions from Wright and other firms in Chicago. After returning to Utah he established a firm with his brother-in-law Clifford Percy Evans and Miles Miller between 1917-1922. His works in Utah and throughout the west include meetinghouses for the LDS Church, apartment buildings (Belvedere Apartments) and private residences, and landscape architectural projects. The Prairie School style is exemplified in his William W. Ray house and other homes on Yale Avenue in Salt Lake City. Woolley served as State architect for the State of Utah from 1933-1941. One of Woolley's last works was serving as supervising architect for construction and landscaping at This Is the Place Heritage Monument. He retired in 1950 having served as State architect for the State of Utah from 1933-1941 and in the presidency of the Salt Lake Chapter of the American Institute of Architects.

== Death ==
Woolley died on February 2, 1965, in his long-time home. He was 80 years old. He is buried next to his wife, Dorrit Evans, in Salt Lake City, Utah.

== Works ==
=== Meetinghouses ===
- Yale Ward (1925)
- Garden Park Ward (1939)
- Salt Lake 13th Ward
- Preston, Idaho 3rd Ward
- University Ward (Seattle)

=== Residences ===
- Samuel Jackson House (1911)
- William J. Salmon House (1912)
- Alboroni H. Woolley House (1914)
- Andrew Jensen House (1915)
- John Jensen House (1915)
- William W. Ray House (1916)
- Bernard Stewart Residence

=== Landscape architecture ===
- Salt Lake City Cemetery Gate (1915)
- Memory Grove Park
- Gates to Wasatch Lawn
- Gilmer Park Neighborhood's curving streets
- This Is the Place Monument (1947)
