= 1948 Lake Mead Boeing B-29 crash =

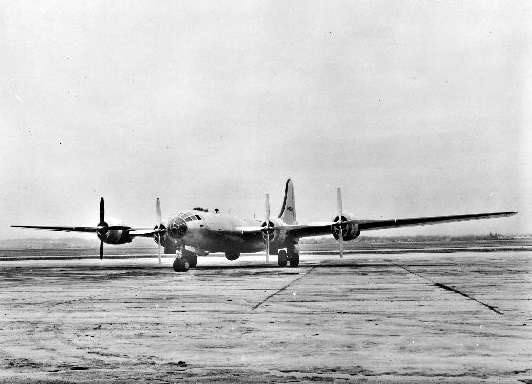
- An F-13 variant of the Boeing B-29 Superfortress, similar to the accident aircraft

Accident
- Date: 21 July 1948
- Summary: Controlled flight into terrain (CFIT) due to pilot error
- Site: Lake Mead, Nevada, US

Aircraft
- Aircraft type: Boeing F-13 Superfortress
- Operator: United States Air Force
- Registration: 45-21847
- Destination: Armitage Field (now NAWS China Lake), California
- Occupants: 5
- Crew: 5 (Pilot Robert Madison; Lt Paul M. Hesler; Sgt Frank Rico; SSgt David Burns; Scientist John Simeroth)
- Fatalities: 0
- Injuries: 1 (Sgt Frank Rico: Broken Arm)
- Survivors: 5

The 1948 Lake Mead Boeing B-29 crash occurred 21 July 1948 when a Boeing B-29-100-BW Superfortress, modified into an F-13 reconnaissance platform and performing atmospheric research, crashed into the waters of Lake Mead, Nevada. Listed as a National Register of Historic Places site, the wreckage is around 100 feet underwater.

== History ==
On 13 September 1945, "Lake Mead's B-29", serial number 45-21847, was put into service. In 1947 it was stripped of armaments, re-classified as a reconnaissance B-29 (F-13), and moved into the Upper Atmosphere Research Project. The purpose of this project was to develop an intercontinental ballistic missile guidance system that used the sun for direction and positioning. The system was known as the "Sun Tracker", and to test it a plane capable of high-altitude flight followed by a rapid low-level flight was needed. The B-29 was a useful test platform as it was the first mass-produced aircraft with a pressurized cockpit, and after World War II there were many surplus B-29s available.

On 21 July 1948, after completing a run to 30,000 feet (9,100 m), east of Lake Mead, Captain Robert M. Madison and the crew began a descent and leveled out just over 300 feet (91 m) above the surface of Lake Mead. The crew described the lake as looking like a mirror, with the sun reflecting brightly off the surface. Along with a faulty altimeter, the pilot lost his depth perception from the glare of the lake surface. These conditions make judging height above a surface considerably more difficult. The aircraft then slowly began to descend below 100 ft (30 m) until it struck the surface at 230 mph (370 km/h) and started skipping along it. Three of the aircraft's four engines were ripped from its wings and the fourth burst into flames. The aircraft managed to gain around 250 ft (76 m) but then settled back onto the water's surface in a nose-up attitude and slowly skiing to a stop. The five-man crew then evacuated into two life rafts and watched the aircraft sink. Though most of the crew was uninjured, the scanner, Sgt Frank Rico, broke his arm.

The crew was rescued from the lake six hours later and was instructed not to disclose any details of the flight, its mission, or its loss. As the mission was classified, these details were not released until 50 years later.

== Wreckage ==
- B-29 Serial No. 45-21847 (Heavy Bomber)
- U.S. National Register of Historic Places
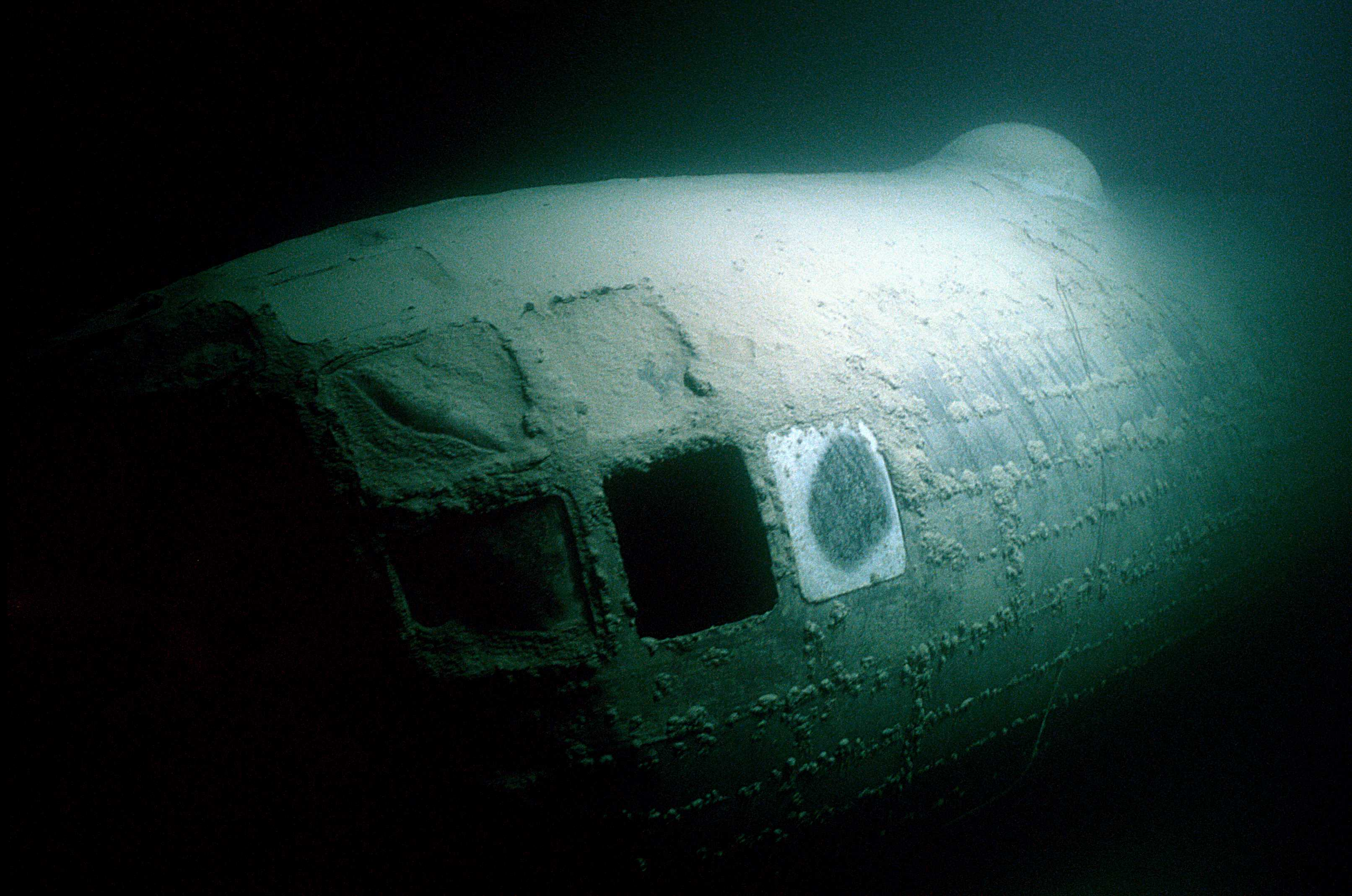
- Nearest city: Overton, Nevada
- NRHP reference No.: 11000212
- Added to NRHP: 20 April 2011

In 2001, a private dive team found the wreck of the B-29 in the Overton Arm of Lake Mead at around 280 feet, using side-scan sonar. Because the bomber lay inside a National Recreation Area, responsibility for the site fell to the National Park Service.

The bomber itself is listed on the National Register of Historic Places. In July 2007 the National Park Service started a six-month trial on the B-29 Lake Mead Overton site to allow private companies to conduct Guided Technical Dives. One company was Scuba Training and Technology Inc. / Tech Diving Limited based in Arizona. Despite being pleased with the overall preservation of the site by the two commercial use authorization (CUA) operations, the NPS closed the B-29 site for diving in 2008 for further conservation efforts.

In December 2014, NPS solicited applications for private dive companies to resume guided dive operations. Scuba Training and Technology Inc. / Tech Diving Limited was awarded the Commercial Use Authorization again and diving resumed beginning April 2015.

In 2017, the NPS closed the B-29 site for diving, for further conservation efforts. On May 30, 2019, the Park Service opened a public comment period (through June 30, 2019) to assess allowance of commercially guided trips to the site. Commercial tours were available through various scuba diving companies from 2020 to 2022.

Due to changing water levels in Lake Mead, it is currently around 100 feet deep.

== The Sun Tracker ==
Many World War II-era B-29s were scrapped after the atomic bombings of Hiroshima and Nagasaki in August 1945. However, Lake Mead's B-29 was retrofitted with observation windows, making it a suitable candidate for research on cosmic rays in the post-World War II years. The B-29 bombers were beneficial for this research due to their ability to travel upwards of 30,000 feet in altitude and also their ability to carry heavy payloads over 20,000 pounds. Aboard the Lake Mead B-29 was the Sun Tracker, otherwise known as Project 288, which was tasked with measuring light intensity at varying altitudes. John Simeroth, one of the crew members aboard the plane during the crash, was responsible for calibrating the Sun Tracker. The Sun Tracker, when calibrated correctly, would allow intercontinental ballistic missiles to navigate using these cosmic rays from the sun. The way it was able to track the specific wavelengths of the cosmic rays was through a gyroscope and a spectrometer. The Sun Tracker would rotate around the gyroscope and capture the varying rays from the sun. The spectrometer would measure the variations between the different intensities and calculate the overall changes. One of the reasons for the development of this technology is that the United States sought missiles that could not be jammed from the surface, unlike radar and radio-guided missiles. The Sun Tracker is one of the reasons today's cruise missiles can fly accurately. Other research using the Sun Tracker technology yielded a substantial amount of data on the general makeup of the upper atmosphere, which was beneficial for many different types of applications such as space travel, and improvements in nuclear fission.

== Quagga mussel threat ==
Quagga mussels contribute to structural integrity problems with the aluminum fuselage and empennage of the B-29, on which over two tons of mussels are estimated to have accumulated; as of September 2021, the vertical stabilizer of the aircraft has broken and toppled, possibly related to mollusk accumulation. When the mussels die, their remains corrode steel and cast-iron. The Lake Mead B-29's preservation is considered important due to it being the only intact underwater B-29 and one of few still in existence. There is currently no plan set in place to eliminate the mussel threat. Matthew Hanks, an archeologist, noted that there was almost no visible aluminum on the surface of the plane after an inspection dive.

== In popular culture ==
In the 2010 action role-playing game Fallout: New Vegas, the crashed B-29 can be found still at the bottom of Lake Mead after a worldwide nuclear war. An isolationist and xenophobic faction called the "Boomers" taking refuge at Nellis Air Force Base task the player in swimming to the bottom of the lake and forcing the plane to the surface.
