= Lords of St. Thomas =

2018 novel by Jackson Ellis

- First edition cover
- Author: Jackson Ellis
- Cover artist: Nathaniel Pollard
- Language: English
- Genre: Literary, historical, coming-of-age
- Publisher: Green Writers Press
- Publication date: April 10, 2018
- Publication place: United States
- Media type: Print (paperback)
- Pages: 184
- ISBN: 978-0-999-07668-2

Lords of St. Thomas is a 2018 historical novel by American writer Jackson Ellis. The novel won the inaugural Howard Frank Mosher Book Prize in 2017, selected by Howard Frank Mosher himself shortly before his death in January 2017.

== Setting ==
The novel is set in the real-life ghost town of St. Thomas, Nevada, in Clark County, approximately 60 miles northeast of Las Vegas. It was flooded in June 1938 by Lake Mead following construction of the Boulder Dam and remained underwater for 64 years. Due to ongoing drought, the ruins of the town permanently resurfaced in 2002. It is now located within Lake Mead National Recreation Area adjacent to Valley of Fire State Park.

== Plot ==
In 1933, six-year-old "Little" Henry Lord lives in the village of St. Thomas, Nevada, with his mother, Ellen Lord, father, Thomas Lord, and paternal grandfather, Henry Lord, an auto mechanic. St. Thomas is to be flooded entirely by Lake Mead following construction of the Boulder (Hoover) Dam.

The elder Henry believes that water will never reach his home, and refuses the government's attempts to buy his land. However, Thomas takes a job with Six Companies, the construction group building the Hoover Dam, to earn enough to buy his own home.

Living and working in Boulder City, Thomas only visits St. Thomas every few weeks. On one visit, Thomas takes Little Henry into the crawl space below the family home. Here, he shows his son a safe where he keeps his valuables, and makes Little Henry promise to safeguard the contents should anything ever happen to him. On July 6, 1935, Thomas falls to his death at the dam.

In the spring following Thomas's death, Henry buys a rowboat with an outboard motor. Fishing on the Muddy River becomes a favorite pastime.

Water finally reaches St. Thomas in mid-1938. Henry finally decides to purchase a new home in Overton, Nevada, and he and Little Henry go out on the Muddy for one last boat ride. While boating, a violent thunderstorm begins, flooding their house. Little Henry realizes he cannot reach the safe; worse, his mother has vanished.

Two days later, on June 11, 1938, Henry sets his house on fire and leaves St. Thomas with Little Henry in the rowboat.

In Overton, Henry opens a new auto garage near his new home. His grandson continues to attend school and develops into a fine athlete, as well as an apt mechanic. Henry plans to give his business to his grandson, but Little Henry wishes to attend college in Montana. In August 1944, they plan a trip to Yellowstone National Park, and Henry promises to visit his grandson in Montana. However, the night before Little Henry's departure, his grandfather dies of a heart attack.

It is now December 8, 2002. Little Henry is now a 76-year-old widower residing in Las Vegas. An article in the Las Vegas Review-Journal explains that drought has exposed the ruins of St. Thomas, underwater for six decades. Accompanying the story is a photo of the elevated concrete foundation of the Lord homestead. Little Henry sets off to find his father's safe.

Unfortunately, the safe is impossible to open. In frustration, Little Henry strikes the safe with a crowbar, inadvertently digging a small hole in the silt and knocking over his bottle of water, which spills into the hole. In the hole he finds a white object, which appears to be a large shell. He begins to dig it out and uncovers his mother's gold necklace. He realizes that the white object is actually a part of her skeleton. During the storm, Ellen attempted to remove the contents of the safe herself, but was trapped under the house and drowned. Little Henry decides that he will return to St. Thomas to once again attempt to open the safe but determines that his mother's remains will stay in St. Thomas, along with the remains of many other family members.

== Characters ==
- Henry Lord, an auto mechanic
- Ellen Lord, his daughter-in-law
- Thomas Lord, his son
- "Little" Henry Lord, son of Ellen and Thomas, grandson of Henry, narrator
- Mr. Whitmore, the postman
- Charlie Snyder, Little Henry's friend in 2002
- Louis, the waiter at Sahara Saloon

== Background ==
Ellis visited St. Thomas for the first time in 2012 and was intrigued by the remains of the Fenton Whitney home. Entering the crawl space beneath the elevated concrete foundation, he wondered what it would have been like for someone who left St. Thomas as a child to return more than 60 years later, and what they might have left behind as a child that could be retrieved after six decades underwater.

Further inspiration was provided by the story of Hugh Lord. Lord refused to leave St. Thomas until June 11, 1938, when the water was high enough for him to step out his front door into his boat. Then he set fire to his house and watched it burn. He was the last resident of St. Thomas to leave.

== Reception ==
Author Howard Frank Mosher, who selected the novel to be the inaugural winner of the book prize named in his honor, stated that "Lords of St. Thomas is both a terrific coming-of-age story and an exact and haunting evocation of a bygone time and place. What's more, it's a great read."

New England Review of Books called it "a thrilling story where readers measure how much they value their rights and how far they're willing to fight for them. Ellis does a compelling job of showing the Lord family's nearly noble hopelessness in their fight to change a fait accompli, without capitulating to sentimentality."

Midwest Book Review stated, "Lords of St. Thomas masterfully couples a historic event with a classic coming of age story...[offering] a glimpse into the past and a glimmer of hope for the future."

Pam Ferrell of the Historical Novel Society wrote, "Beautifully written, Lords of St. Thomas is the story of tragedies leading to subsequent tragedies [and] a thoughtful portrayal of the human consequences of major environmental changes," while Margot Harrison of Seven Days called it "a sparsely eloquent, elegiac novel."
