= KJUL =

Simulcasting KQLL Henderson
- Moapa Valley, Nevada; United States
- Broadcast area: Las Vegas metropolitan area
- Frequency: 104.7 MHz
- Branding: Kool 102.3 & 104.7

Programming
- Format: Oldies
- Affiliations: Fox News Radio; Compass Media Networks

Ownership
- Owner: Summit American, Inc.
- Sister stations: KQLL

History
- First air date: July 1, 2001 (as KBHQ)
- Former call signs: KBHQ (1998–2005); KWLY (2005)
- Call sign meaning: "Jewel" (former branding)

Technical information
- Facility ID: 63769
- Class: C1
- ERP: 100,000 watts
- HAAT: 184.0 meters (603.7 ft)
- Transmitter coordinates: 36°41′0″N 114°30′48″W

Links
- Webcast: Listen live
- Website: kool1023.com

KJUL (104.7 FM) is a radio station broadcasting an oldies format with a KQLL simulcast. Licensed to Moapa Valley, Nevada, United States, the station serves most of the Las Vegas metropolitan area. The station is owned by Summit American, Inc. Its studios are on Spectrum Boulevard in Las Vegas.

KJUL is a Class C1 FM station. It has an effective radiated power (ERP) of 100,000 watts, the maximum for most FM stations. The transmitter is off Interstate 15 in Moapa Valley, about 50 miles northeast of Las Vegas. It is also heard on several FM translators in Beatty and Oasis Valley.

== History ==
While it was still a construction permit, not yet built, the station was assigned the call letters KBHQ on July 17, 1998. The station was licensed in 2001, signing on July 1. In 2005, KBHQ was upgraded to a full class-C1 facility with an increase of tower height and a 100,000 watt signal. On July 20, 2005, the station changed its call sign to KWLY, concurrent with a relaunch as classic country station "Willie". It became KJUL on November 4, 2005, ahead of picking up adult standards format of KJUL (104.3 FM), which had switched to country music as KCYE, on November 7.

On June 2, 2025, KJUL changed their format from classic hits to a simulcast of oldies-formatted KQLL 1280 AM Henderson, branded as "Kool 102.3 & 104.7".
