= Lava Hot Springs (thermal mineral springs) =

Thermal springs in Bannock County, Idaho, United States

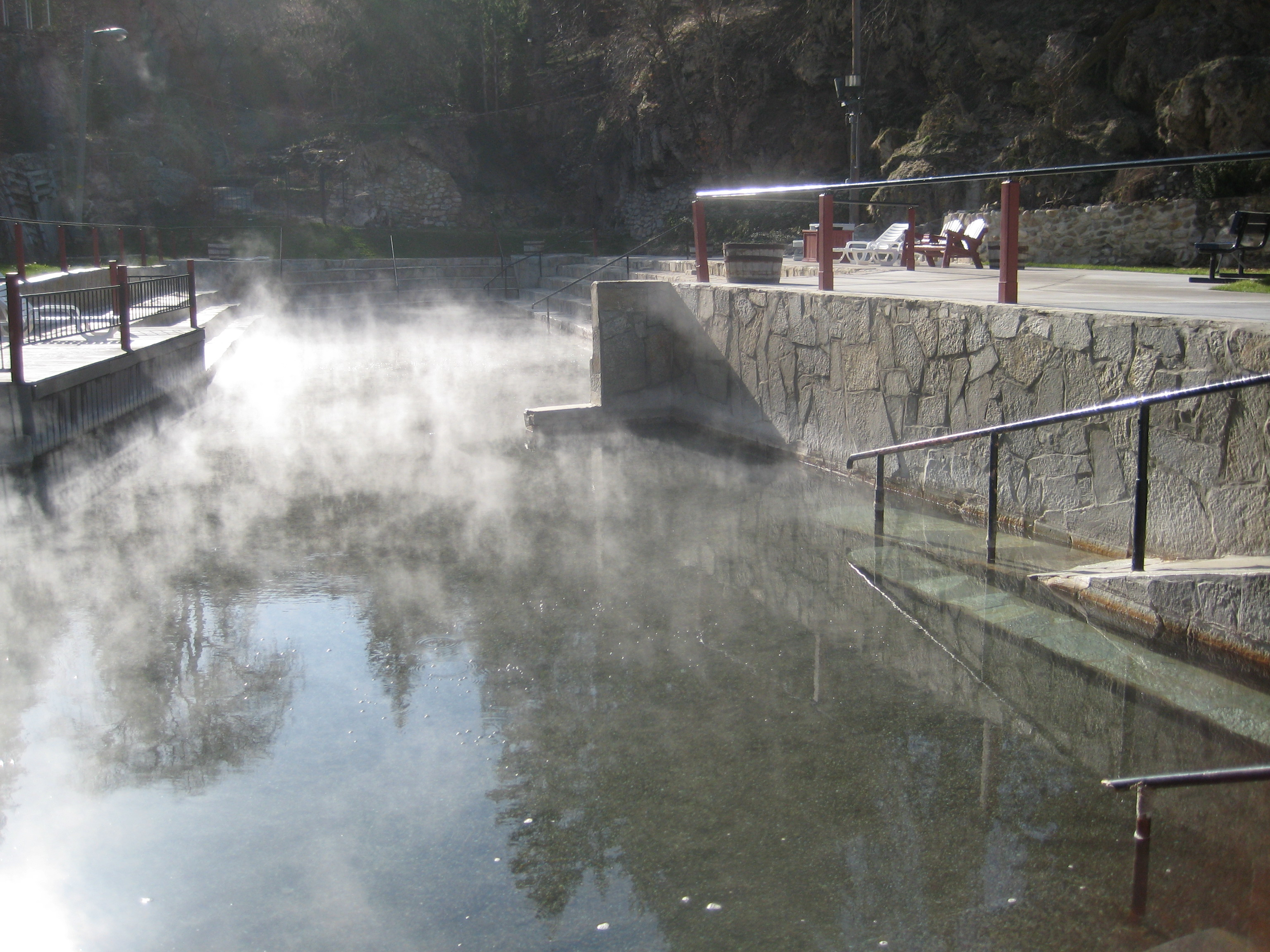

- Location within Idaho Location within the United States
- Interactive map of Lava Hot Springs
- Coordinates: 42°37′10″N 112°0′51″W
- Elevation: 5,020 feet (1,530 m)
- Type: Geothermal
- Discharge: 34 gallons/second / 130 liters/second.
- Temperature: 113 °F (45 °C)

Lava Hot Springs are a system of geothermal mineral springs in Bannock County, Idaho, United States, in the area of the city named after them, Lava Hot Springs.

== History ==
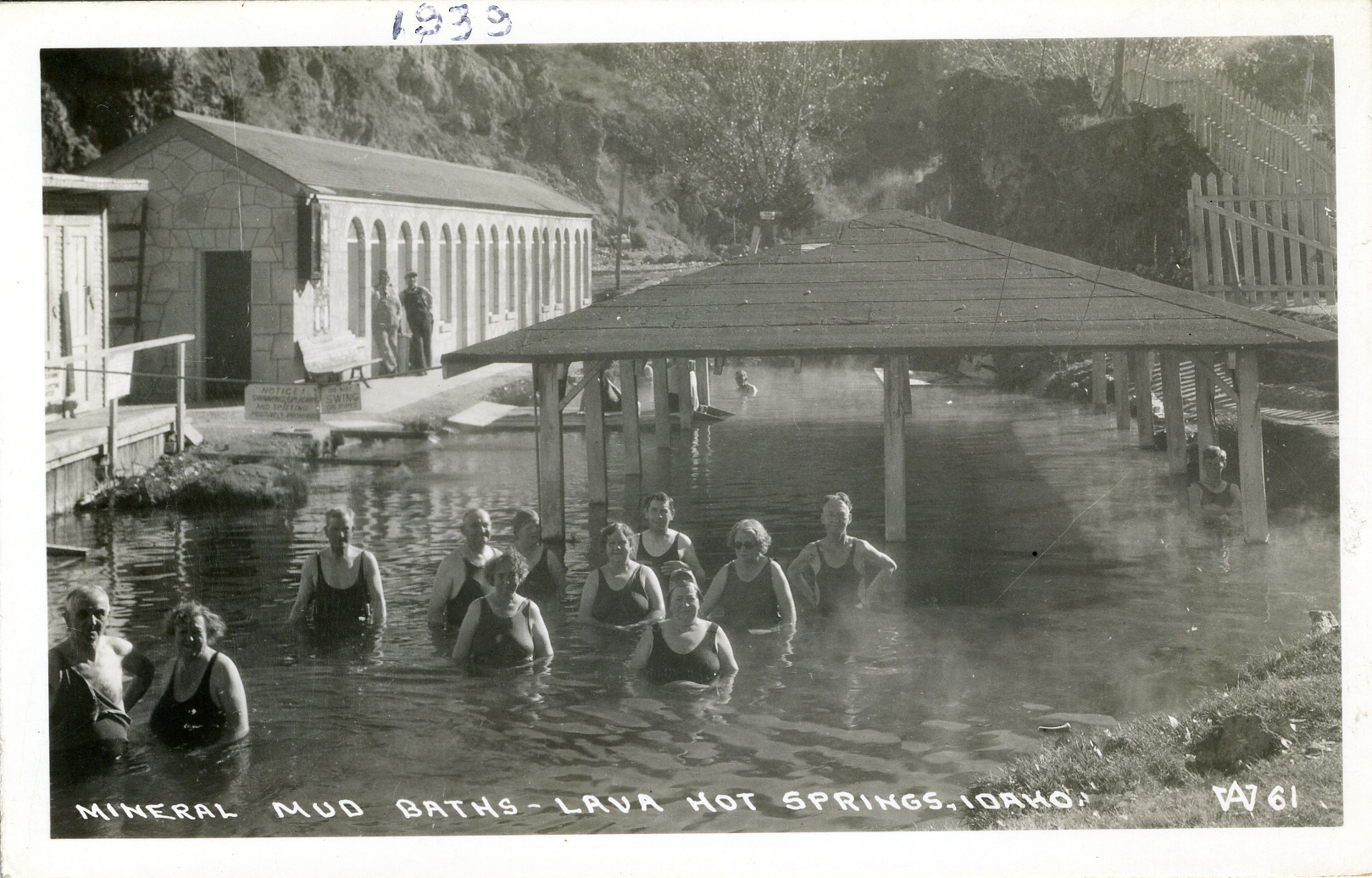
Lava Hot Springs in 1939

The springs were historically used by local Bannock and Shoshone Native Americans. In the early 1800s, explorers and fur trappers knew of the hot springs, and Robert Dempsey built a permanent camp nearby. During the 1840s and 50s, travellers headed to California and Oregon were aware of the springs. In 1890, John and Mary Hall, English immigrants homesteaded the site. In 1902, the Shoshone and Bannock peoples ceded the hot springs site and surrounding acreage to the U.S. government.

== Geography ==
Lava Hot Springs is located at 42°37′10″N 112°0′51″W (42.619482, -112.014283), at an elevation of 5,020 feet (1,530 m) above sea level.

== Geology ==
The rock content of the spring vents consist of Paleozoic quartzite and younger travertine.

== Water profile ==
The spring system has a flow of 34 gallons/second / 130 liters/second. The hot mineral water emerges from the ground at 113°F / 45°C. The mineral content of the water includes manganese, sodium, iron, calcium bicarbonate, potassium, magnesium, iron, zinc and fluoride.

== See also ==
- List of hot springs in the United States
- List of hot springs in the world
