= St. Thomas Memorial Cemetery =

Historic cemetery in Nevada, United States

- U.S. National Register of Historic Places
- Location within Nevada Location within the United States
- Location: Magnasite Rd. off Moapa Valley Blvd., Overton, Clark County, Nevada, U.S.
- Coordinates: 36°31′14″N 114°26′7″W
- Area: 5.1 acres (2.1 ha)
- Built: 1935
- NRHP reference No.: 04001529
- Added to NRHP: January 20, 2005

St. Thomas Memorial Cemetery located in Overton, Nevada was listed on the United States' National Register of Historic Places on February 1, 2005.

== History ==
The cemetery was associated with the early Mormon settlements in the area, including St. Thomas, Nevada. It was moved to its present location in 1935 to remove it from area to be covered by Lake Mead following the construction of Hoover Dam. For a short period it was referred to as Mead Lake Cemetery before finally acquiring the name of St. Thomas Memorial Cemetery. The cemetery is maintained by the community.

== External links and sources ==
- Nevada Department of Cultural Affairs
