= Clifford Percy Evans =

American architect

Clifford Percy Evans (August 21, 1889 – June 14, 1973) was an American architect based in Salt Lake City, Utah. He graduated from Columbia University and became a draftsman for famous architect Frank Lloyd Wright in Chicago, Illinois. Evans was one of only two architects from Utah, the other being Taylor Woolley, who worked under Wright.

In 1917 he established an architectural firm in Salt Lake City with Miles Miller and Wright's other draftsman from Utah, Taylor Woolley, that lasted until 1922. With Woolley he designed the Yale Ward Meetinghouse of the Church of Jesus Christ of Latter-day Saints (LDS Church). Additionally, Evans designed over 150 buildings for that church over the course of his career.

== Personal life ==
Evans was drafted into the armed forces in June 1918 and saw combat during World War I. His brother Raymond Evans was also an architect in Salt Lake City, and his sister Dorrit Evans was married to architect and firm partner Taylor Woolley.
