= Logandale, Nevada =

Unincorporated community in Nevada, US

Logandale
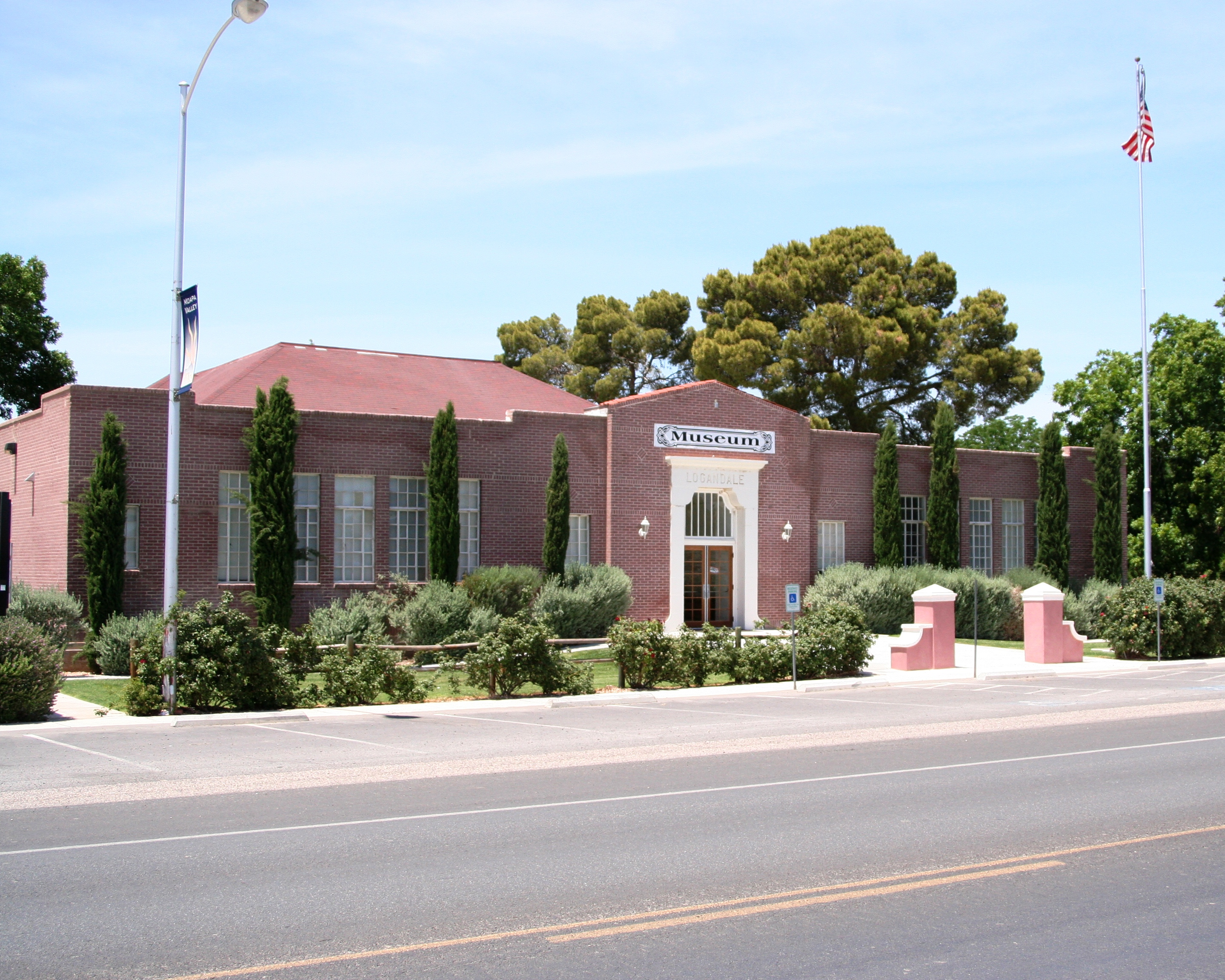
- The Old Logandale School, Logandale, NV

- Location within the state of Nevada
- Coordinates: 36°35′48″N 114°29′03″W
- Country: United States
- State: Nevada
- County: Clark
- Elevation: 1,385 ft (422 m)
- Time zone: UTC-8 (Pacific (PST))
  - Summer (DST): UTC-7 (PDT)
- ZIP code: 89021
- Area codes: 702 and 725
- GNIS feature ID: 845889

Logandale is located in Clark County, Nevada. It was an unincorporated town in Clark County until 1981 when it was merged with Overton to create the unincorporated town of Moapa Valley. The community is the home of the annual Clark County Fair and Rodeo.

== History ==
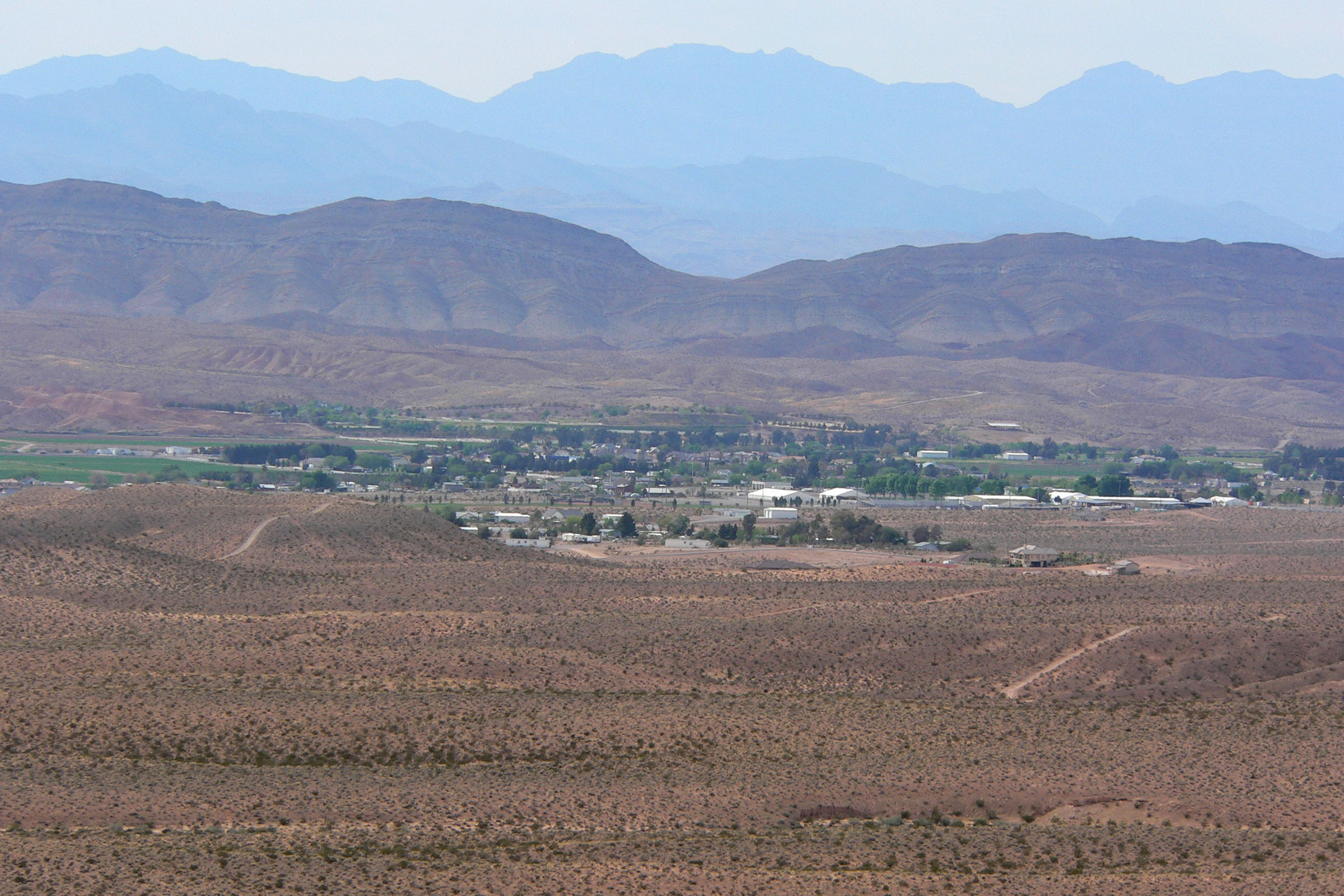
View of Logandale

Established on the west side of the Muddy River in 1865, Logandale was originally named St. Joseph. It was moved and renamed New St. Joseph, or St. Joseph #2 in 1868, by settlers driven out of their first town of Saint Joseph, Nevada on the east side of the Muddy River when it burned down. It also acquired the post office established in the old town on August 26, 1867.

The new Saint Joseph like the other Mormon settlements in the Moapa Valley was abandoned in 1871 due to a tax dispute with the state of Nevada. Its post office closed in October 1871 but became active again on in May 1876. Following the Mormon return to Overton in 1880, in November 1883 the post office operations were moved there.

The town began to revive in 1912 around a railroad station with the name Logan, which some believe was named for a Civil War veteran who settled on the abandoned town site, although this has never been documented. It was subsequently renamed Logandale because the mail kept winding up in Logan, Utah.

== Geography ==
Logandale is located at the north end of Moapa Valley. The town can be accessed by taking exit 93 off of Interstate Highway 15, going south on Highway 169.

== Demographics ==
Logandale is in the Moapa Valley, Nevada Census Bureau Census-designated place (CDP).

== Media ==
KADD is licensed to the town.

== Culture ==
The Clark County Fair and Rodeo is held annually in Logandale.

== Notable Residents ==
- Cole Nielson, USU student

== Education ==
The Clark County School District serves the area.
