= KQLL =

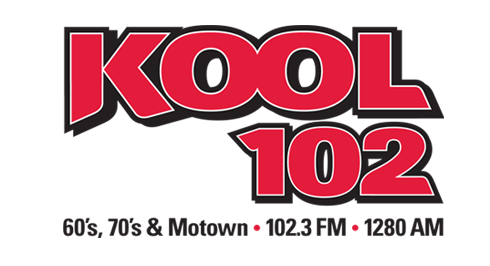
- Henderson, Nevada; United States
- Broadcast area: Las Vegas metropolitan area
- Frequency: 1280 kHz
- Branding: Kool 102.3 and 104.7 FM

Programming
- Format: Oldies
- Affiliations: Fox News Radio

Ownership
- Owner: Summit Media; (S & R Broadcasting, Inc)

History
- First air date: May 1956
- Former call signs: KVOV (1956–1984); KREL (1984–1991); KDOL (1991–1998); KDOX (1998–2010)
- Call sign meaning: Similar to "kool"

Technical information
- Licensing authority: FCC
- Facility ID: 58317
- Class: D
- Power: 5,000 watts (day); 28 watts (night)
- Transmitter coordinates: 36°12′38.9″N 115°9′50.0″W
- Translator: 102.3 K272EE (Las Vegas)
- Repeater: 104.7 KJUL (Moapa Valley)

Links
- Public license information: Public file; LMS
- Webcast: Listen live
- Website: kool1023.com

KQLL (1280 AM, "Kool 102") is a commercial radio station licensed to Henderson, Nevada, and broadcasting to the Las Vegas metropolitan area. KQLL and KJUL (104.7 FM) simulcast an oldies format. They are owned by Summit Media with studios and offices on Spectrum Boulevard in Las Vegas.

By day, KQLL is powered at 5,000 watts using a non-directional antenna, at night to protect other stations on 1280 AM from interference, it reduces power to only 28 watts. Programming is also heard on 250-watt FM translator K272EE at 102.3 MHz in Las Vegas.

== History ==
The station signed on the air in May 1956 as KVOV. At first, it was a daytimer, powered at 5,000 watts but required to go off the air at night. It was assigned the call letters KREL on February 17, 1984. On January 28, 1991, the station changed its call sign to KDOL, and on March 6, 1998, to KDOX.

In the late 1990s and early 2000s, KDOX aired a talk radio format known as "Fox News Radio 1280." In August 2010, KDOX introduced a live, local mid-morning talk show hosted by Casey Hendrickson and Heather Kydd. They formerly were the morning drive time team on rival talk station 870 KXNT).

On August 12, 2010, KDOX began simulcasting on a 99-watt FM translator on 102.3 MHz. The station had purchased the construction permit for K272EE, licensed to Moapa, Nevada, two months earlier. The price tag was $100.

On December 31, 2010, KDOX changed formats to a 1950s, 60s and 70s oldies sound known as "Kool 102". Along with the format change, the call letters were changed as well to reflect the oldies playlist. The station became known as KQLL, standing for the word "Kool." On June 2, 2025, KJUL changed its format from classic hits to a simulcast of KQLL 1280 AM. The stations were then branded as "Kool 102.3 & 104.7".

== Translator ==
Call sign	Frequency	City of license	FID	ERP (W)	Class	FCC info
K272EE	102.3 FM	Las Vegas, Nevada	157240	250	D	LMS
