= Lost City Museum =

- Boulder Dam Park Museum
- U.S. National Register of Historic Places
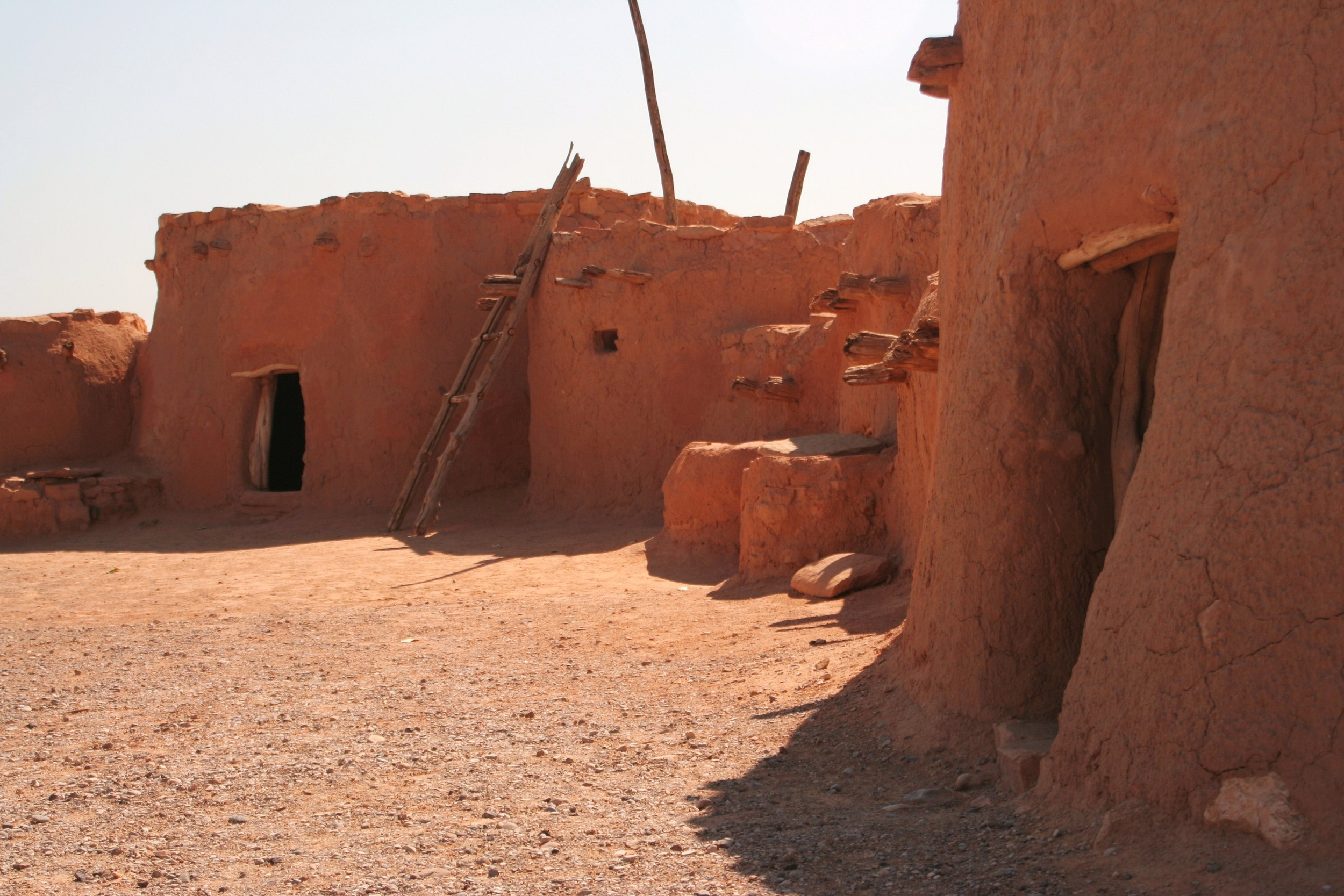
- Reconstructed Anasazi Pueblos in Lost City Museum

- Location within Nevada Location within the United States
- Location: SR 169, W side Overton, Nevada
- Coordinates: 36°31′53″N 114°26′24″W
- NRHP reference No.: 96000126
- Added to NRHP: February 22, 1996

The Lost City Museum, formerly known as the Boulder Dam Park Museum, is located in Overton, Nevada and is one of seven museums managed by the Nevada Division of Museums and History, an agency of the Nevada Department of Tourism and Cultural Affairs.

== History ==
The Lost City Museum shares its location with an actual prehistoric site of the Ancestral Puebloans. The museum was built by the Civilian Conservation Corps in 1935 and was operated by the National Park Service to exhibit artifacts from the Pueblo Grande de Nevada archaeological sites, which were going to be partially covered by the waters of Lake Mead as a result of building the Hoover Dam.

In 1981, an extension of the museum was built, incorporating some ruins in order to protect them and share them with the public.

== Description ==
The museum offers a reconstructed Puebloan house-site that is open to visitors. The museum has displays depicting the excavations of the sites, artifacts unearthed during the project, pictures of the historical excavations, an excavated pithouse and reconstructions of the Puebloan houses. Pottery, shells, jewelry and many other examples that showcase the history of the early inhabitants are on display at the museum.
