= Moapa Valley, Nevada =

Unincorporated town in the State of Nevada, United States

- Unincorporated town
- Location of Moapa Valley in Clark County, Nevada
- Coordinates: 36°34′28″N 114°27′29″W
- Country: United States
- State: Nevada
- County: Clark

Area
  - Total: 43.68 sq mi (113.13 km^{2})
  - Land: 43.66 sq mi (113.07 km^{2})
  - Water: 0.023 sq mi (0.06 km^{2})
- Elevation: 1,335 ft (407 m)

Population (2020)
  - Total: 6,289
  - Density: 144.1/sq mi (55.62/km^{2})
- Time zone: UTC-8 (PST)
  - Summer (DST): UTC-7 (PDT)
- Area codes: 702 and 725
- FIPS code: 32-47880
- GNIS feature ID: 1867349
- Website: Moapa Valley Town Advisory Board

Moapa Valley is an unincorporated town in Clark County, Nevada, United States. As of the 2010 census, it had a population of 6,924. The valley in which the community lies, also named Moapa Valley, is about 40 miles (64 km) long and lies roughly northwest to southeast.

== Geography ==
The Muddy River, formerly called the Moapa River, originates from the Warm Springs Natural Area and flows through the valley before emptying into Lake Mead. The communities of Moapa Town, Logandale and Overton are located in the valley. Logandale is about 12 miles (19 km) southeast of Moapa Town, and Overton is about 5 miles (8.0 km) southeast of Logandale. Prior to the creation of Lake Mead, Moapa Valley also included the town of St. Thomas, which was abandoned in 1938 due to the rising lake level.

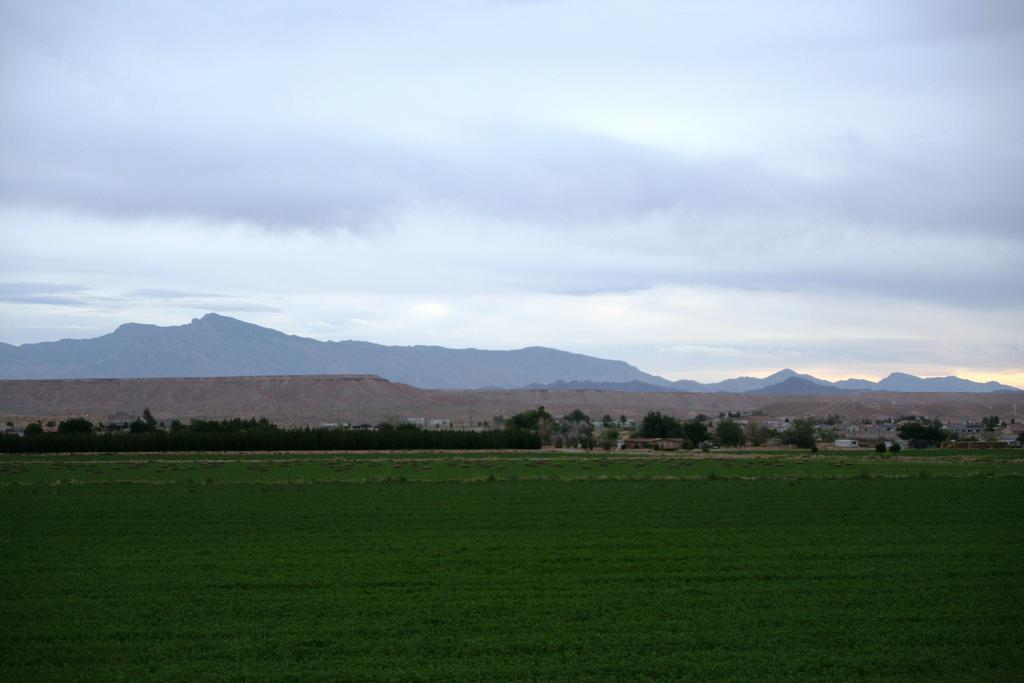
From Moapa Valley, looking east towards the Mormon Mesa

Moapa Valley is at an elevation of 1,265 ft (386 m) above sea level. The United States Census Bureau gives the census-designated place (CDP) of Moapa Valley (which may not coincide exactly with the town boundaries) a total area of 43.7 square miles (113.2 km^{2}), of which 43.7 square miles (113.1 km^{2}) is land and 0.04 square miles (0.1 km^{2}), or 0.05%, is water.

== Demographics ==
Historical population
Census	Pop.	Note	%±
1980	1,111		—
1990	3,444		210.0%
2000	5,784		67.9%
2010	6,924		19.7%
2020	6,289		−9.2%
U.S. Decennial Census

As of the census of 2000, there were 5,784 people, 1,934 households, and 1,525 families residing in the CDP. The population density was 132.7 inhabitants per square mile (51.2/km^{2}). There were 2,213 housing units at an average density of 50.8 per square mile (19.6/km^{2}). The racial makeup of the CDP was 92.41% White, 0.24% African American, 0.66% Native American, 0.26% Asian, 0.36% Pacific Islander, 4.34% from other races, and 1.73% from two or more races. Hispanic or Latino of any race were 9.09% of the population.

There were 1,934 households, out of which 38.8% had children under the age of 18 living with them, 69.8% were married couples living together, 6.5% had a female householder with no husband present, and 21.1% were non-families. 17.8% of all households were made up of individuals, and 10.4% had someone living alone who was 65 years of age or older. The average household size was 2.99 and the average family size was 3.43.

In the CDP, the population was spread out, with 33.5% under the age of 18, 6.7% from 18 to 24, 23.0% from 25 to 44, 21.6% from 45 to 64, and 15.2% who were 65 years of age or older. The median age was 36 years. For every 100 females, there were 101.7 males. For every 100 females age 18 and over, there were 98.2 males.

The median income for a household in the CDP was $39,942, and the median income for a family was $47,575. Males had a median income of $42,348 versus $26,442 for females. The per capita income for the CDP was $16,696. About 5.7% of families and 6.9% of the population were below the poverty line, including 7.3% of those under age 18 and 8.3% of those age 65 or over.

== History ==
=== Native American ===
The Moapa Valley was originally settled around 350 B.C. by the Ancestral Puebloan people (who used to be called Anasazi by early archeologists). Around 500 A.D., farming supplanted hunting as the major food source for the people known as "Basketmakers". It was also around this time that the art of pottery was introduced. By 600 A.D., Ancestral Puebloan people began building their dwellings above ground, using wood and brush plastered with adobe. Farming was a well-established practice with corn, beans, squash, and cotton being the primary crops. The Puebloans also hunted mule deer, desert bighorn sheep, rabbits, and rodents using bows and arrows.

Around 1000 A.D. Southern Paiutes moved into the Moapa Valley area. The Paiutes were hunter-gatherers who did not utilize agriculture as a primary source of subsistence. They lived in temporary brush dwellings, spoke the Southern Paiute language, and practiced a style of pottery that was less sophisticated than the methods used by the Anasazi. The Paiutes and Anasazi people coexisted with little effort in the valley.

Sometime around 1150 A.D., the Anasazi abandoned Moapa Valley, possibly due to a drought which gripped the Desert Southwest during that time. When the first European (Mormon) settlers arrived, the Paiutes self relocated (banded together) to a reservation north of Moapa Town, where they continue to live today.

=== Settlers ===
The first Euroamerican settlers in the Moapa Valley were Mormon pioneers in the latter 1860s. The area has remained heavily populated by Mormons to the present time. Many streets bear the names of prominent Mormon families, including Barlow, Hinckley, Leavitt, Lyman, Perkins, Whitmore, Wells, and Andersen. The LDS Logandale Stake has thirteen wards. The Huntsmans, a well known pioneer family of Moapa Valley, established the Huntsman Ranch, which the cabin still remains today near Kane Springs. It is a State of Nevada designated historical site.

=== Modern times ===
In 1980, residents of Overton and Logandale approved a referendum on merging the two towns into the town of Moapa Valley. The Clark County Commission affirmed the vote, legally creating Moapa Valley on February 13, 1981. The town had a population of about 1,400 people at the time.

== Radio stations ==
There are four radio stations licensed to Moapa Valley. KRRN 92.7 has a Spanish format. KXLI 94.5 has a dance format mainly targeted to Las Vegas. KJUL 104.7 has a "middle-of-the road" (MOR) format. KQLL has a simulcast of Henderson's 1280 AM on 102.3 FM, which is an oldies music format.

== See also ==
- Lost City Museum
- Pueblo Grande de Nevada
