= St. Thomas, Nevada =

American ghost town (1865, submerged 1938–2000)

Coordinates: 36°27′57″N 114°22′13″W

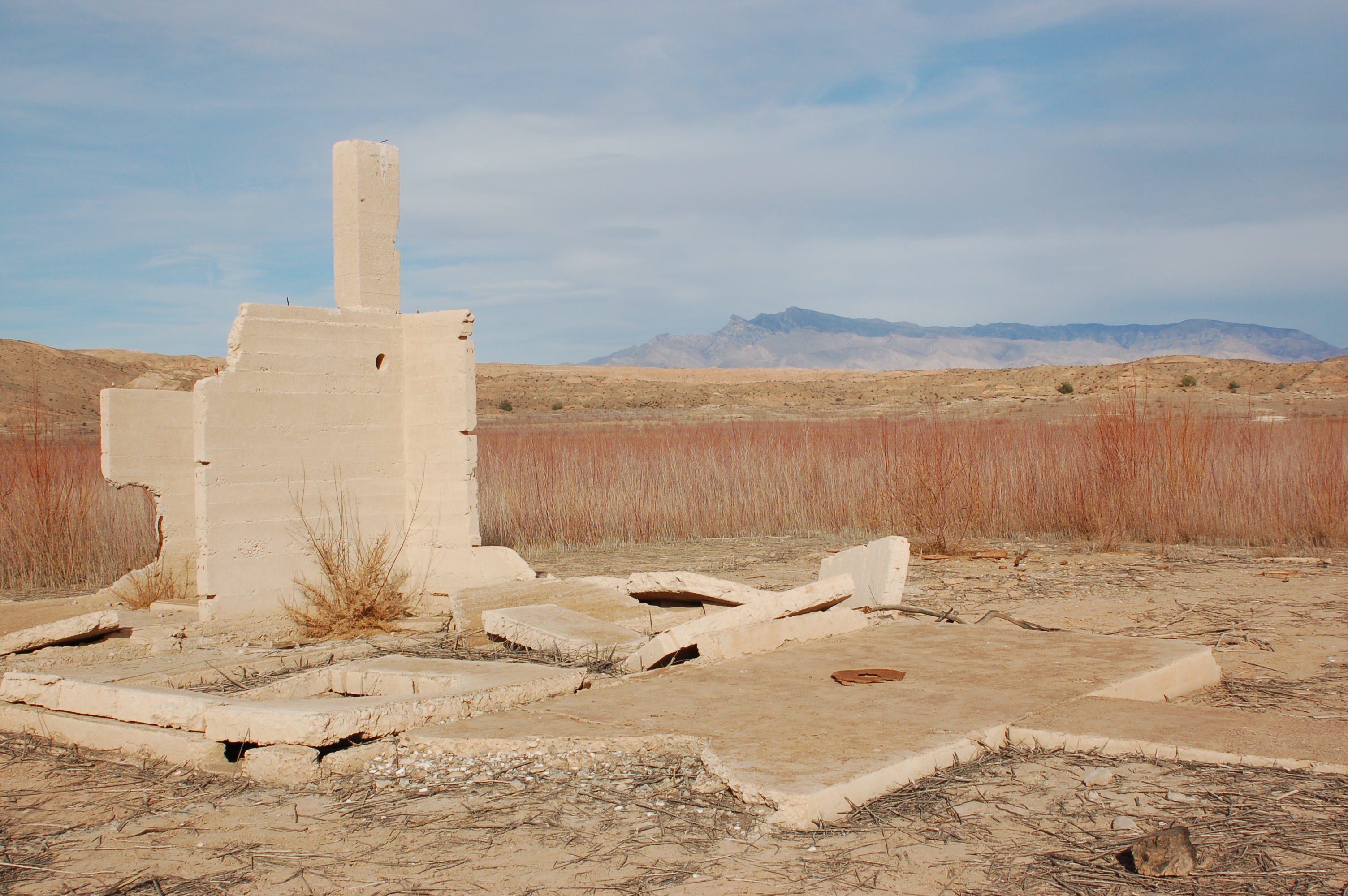
Ruins of Hanig Ice Cream Parlor exposed after being submerged under Lake Mead for many years, February 2007

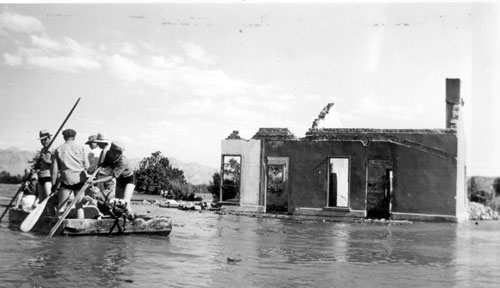
A salvage crew floats by an abandoned building as Lake Mead fills with water, June 1938

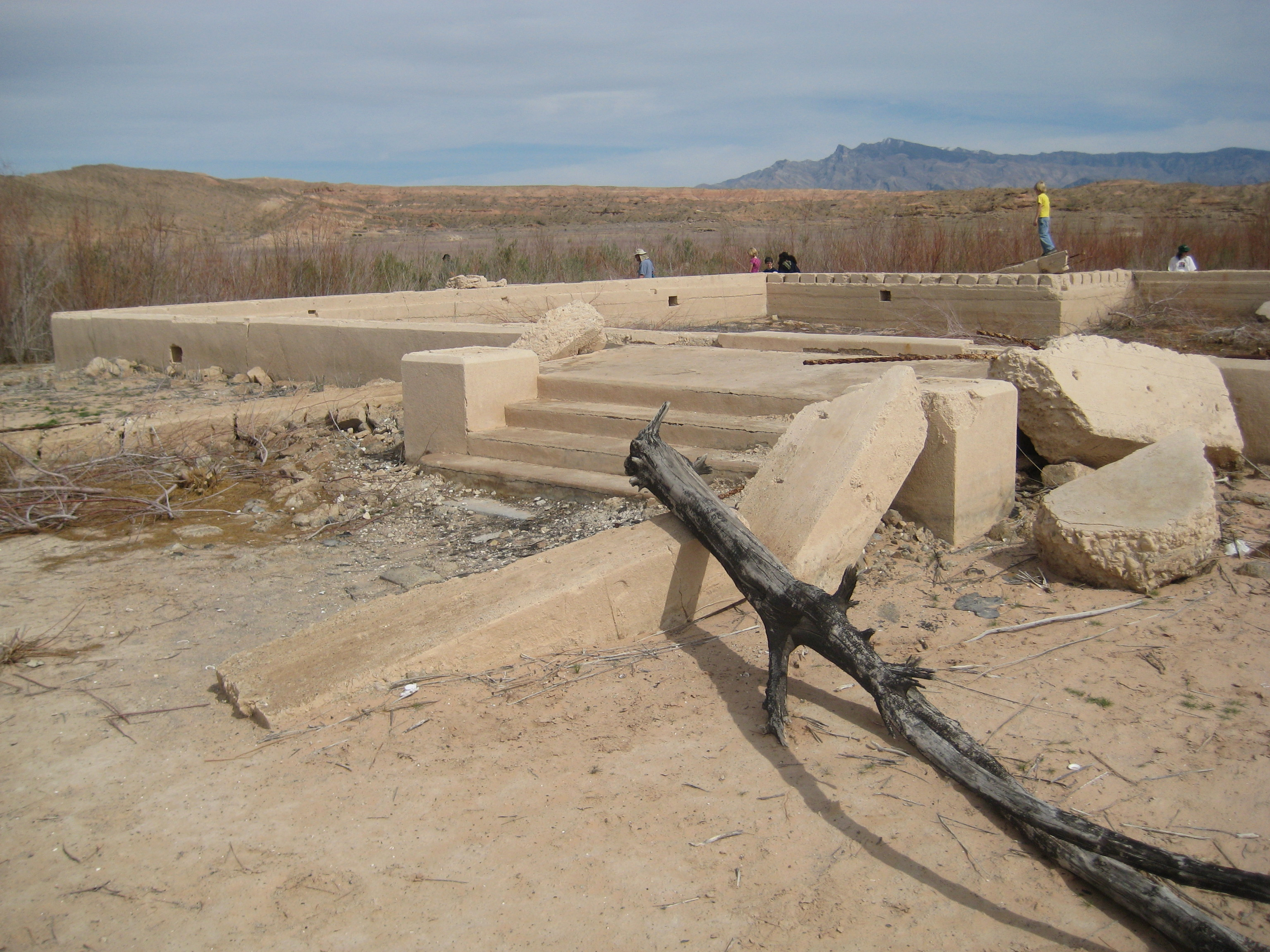
St. Thomas building foundation, February 2009

St. Thomas is a ghost town in Clark County, Nevada, United States, near where the Muddy River flows into the Colorado River. St. Thomas was purchased by the US federal government and abandoned as the waters of Lake Mead submerged the town in the 1930s.

However, as the level of Lake Mead dropped in the 2000s, the ruins of the town resurfaced. It is now located within the Lake Mead National Recreation Area.

== History ==
The town was founded by Mormons (LDS), led by Thomas Smith in 1865. With a population of about 500 at its peak, St. Thomas became an established town of farms and businesses, and was at one point the county seat of Pah-Ute County. The frontier settlement is noted as the endpoint of explorer John Wesley Powell's first Colorado River expedition, the Powell Geographic Expedition of 1869.

LDS Church members abandoned St. Thomas in February 1871, as a land survey shifted the state line of Nevada one degree longitude to the east, placing all of the LDS settlements known as the Muddy Mission in Nevada instead of Arizona or Utah. The state of Nevada then attempted to collect taxes for previous years payable only in gold from the residents. They chose to leave without paying in 1871. The LDS Church members moved to Utah, where many of them founded new towns in Long Valley (present-day Glendale, Orderville, and Mount Carmel).

When the LDS Church members left in 1871, others claimed their abandoned properties. One of the few to remain was Daniel Bonelli of St. Thomas, who farmed, mined and owned Bonelli's Ferry on the Colorado River at Junction City, later called Rioville. After being deserted by most of its first settlers, new LDS settlers came to the St. Thomas and other places in the area in the 1880s.

The construction of Hoover Dam and the resulting rise in the waters of the Colorado River forced the abandonment of the town, with the last resident, Hugh Lord, leaving June 11, 1938.

The ruins of St. Thomas, which became visible after the water level in Lake Mead lowered, are protected by the National Park Service as a historic site. The cemetery was relocated to Overton, Nevada, where there is a St. Thomas interpretive center with a staff archaeologist doing ongoing research into the history and settlement of the Muddy River.

== In popular culture ==
Lords of St. Thomas (GWP, 2018), a novel by Jackson Ellis, tells the story of the last family to vacate the flooded town in 1938 following construction of the Boulder Dam. The book's protagonist, Henry Lord, is based on Hugh Lord.

Muddy: Where Faith and Polygamy Collide (Deseret Book, 2019) by Dean Hughes tells the story of the early LDS pioneers in the settlement.

The novel The Desert Between Us, (University of Nevada Press, 2020) by Phyllis Barber tells the story of early LDS pioneers, polygamy, the U.S. government's decision to open a road to California, and camels.

== Gallery ==
Gentry General Store, c. 1900

Gentry Hotel in 1934

St. Thomas School House in 1934

Abandoned home in 1935

Arrowhead Store Groceries

== See also ==
- List of ghost towns in Nevada
- Rio Virgen County, Utah Territory
- Pah-Ute County, Arizona
- Rio Arriba County, New Mexico
- Potosi, Venezuela
- St. Thomas Branch
- St. Thomas Memorial Cemetery
- Mormon Island, California, another former LDS community submerged by a man-made lake
