= Lava Hot Springs, Idaho =

City in Bannock County, Idaho, United States

- City
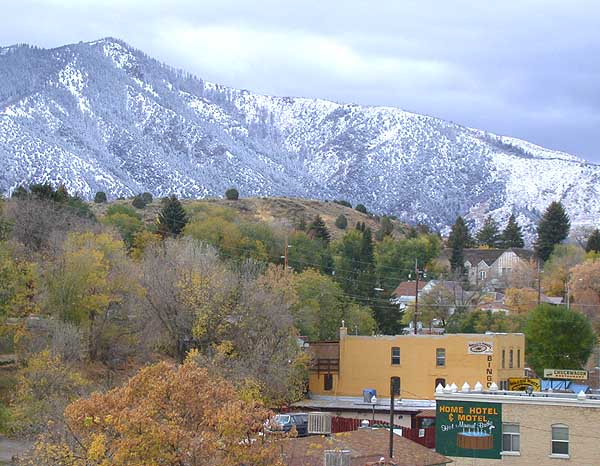
- Lava Hot Springs, October 2004

- Location of Lava Hot Springs in Bannock County, Idaho.
- Coordinates: 42°37′21″N 112°0′21″W
- Country: United States
- State: Idaho
- County: Bannock

Area
  - Total: 0.72 sq mi (1.86 km^{2})
  - Land: 0.69 sq mi (1.79 km^{2})
  - Water: 0.027 sq mi (0.07 km^{2})
- Elevation: 5,007 ft (1,526 m)

Population (2020)
  - Total: 358
  - Density: 623.6/sq mi (240.79/km^{2})
- Time zone: UTC-7 (Mountain (MST))
  - Summer (DST): UTC-6 (MDT)
- ZIP code: 83246
- Area codes: 208, 986
- FIPS code: 16-45820
- GNIS feature ID: 2411635
- Website: www.lavahotspringscity.com

Lava Hot Springs is a city along the Portneuf River in eastern Bannock County, Idaho, United States. It is part of the Pocatello, Idaho metropolitan area. The population was 358 at the 2020 census. Located in the mountainous valley of the Portneuf River on the old route of the Oregon Trail and California Trail, the city has become a popular resort location, noted for its numerous hot springs amenable to bathing and a turbulent inner tube run through part of the town.

== Geography ==
According to the United States Census Bureau, the city has a total area of 0.71 square miles (1.84 km^{2}), of which, 0.68 square miles (1.76 km^{2}) is land and 0.03 square miles (0.08 km^{2}) is water.

== Climate ==
According to the Köppen Climate Classification system, Lava Hot Springs has a warm-summer humid continental climate, abbreviated "Dfb" on climate maps. The hottest temperature recorded in Lava Hot Springs was 102 °F (38.9 °C) on July 14, 2002, while the coldest temperature recorded was −22 °F (−30.0 °C) on February 1, 2023.

Climate data for Lava Hot Springs, Idaho, 1991–2020 normals, extremes 1999–present
Month	Jan	Feb	Mar	Apr	May	Jun	Jul	Aug	Sep	Oct	Nov	Dec	Year
Record high °F (°C)	53 (12)	62 (17)	71 (22)	85 (29)	92 (33)	99 (37)	102 (39)	100 (38)	99 (37)	87 (31)	71 (22)	57 (14)	102 (39)
Mean maximum °F (°C)	44.6 (7.0)	49.4 (9.7)	61.9 (16.6)	74.9 (23.8)	82.9 (28.3)	92.1 (33.4)	96.2 (35.7)	95.4 (35.2)	90.4 (32.4)	76.0 (24.4)	62.9 (17.2)	48.6 (9.2)	97.3 (36.3)
Mean daily maximum °F (°C)	31.9 (−0.1)	36.5 (2.5)	46.9 (8.3)	56.1 (13.4)	66.2 (19.0)	76.2 (24.6)	87.2 (30.7)	85.7 (29.8)	74.8 (23.8)	59.7 (15.4)	44.4 (6.9)	32.9 (0.5)	58.2 (14.6)
Daily mean °F (°C)	23.0 (−5.0)	26.8 (−2.9)	36.0 (2.2)	43.7 (6.5)	52.4 (11.3)	60.5 (15.8)	69.1 (20.6)	67.2 (19.6)	57.8 (14.3)	45.8 (7.7)	34.0 (1.1)	24.1 (−4.4)	45.0 (7.2)
Mean daily minimum °F (°C)	14.0 (−10.0)	17.2 (−8.2)	25.0 (−3.9)	31.3 (−0.4)	38.5 (3.6)	44.7 (7.1)	51.0 (10.6)	48.7 (9.3)	40.7 (4.8)	32.0 (0.0)	23.6 (−4.7)	15.2 (−9.3)	31.8 (−0.1)
Mean minimum °F (°C)	−6.4 (−21.3)	−0.9 (−18.3)	8.8 (−12.9)	19.9 (−6.7)	26.5 (−3.1)	34.4 (1.3)	42.1 (5.6)	39.3 (4.1)	31.4 (−0.3)	18.2 (−7.7)	7.4 (−13.7)	−4.2 (−20.1)	−9.7 (−23.2)
Record low °F (°C)	−21 (−29)	−22 (−30)	−7 (−22)	8 (−13)	20 (−7)	30 (−1)	37 (3)	35 (2)	23 (−5)	−2 (−19)	−10 (−23)	−15 (−26)	−22 (−30)
Average precipitation inches (mm)	1.99 (51)	1.32 (34)	1.91 (49)	1.76 (45)	2.27 (58)	1.32 (34)	0.76 (19)	1.05 (27)	1.43 (36)	1.40 (36)	1.34 (34)	1.70 (43)	18.25 (466)
Average precipitation days (≥ 0.01 in)	11.3	9.6	9.7	10.5	10.2	7.2	5.0	6.3	5.8	7.5	7.8	11.5	102.4
Source 1: NOAA
Source 2: National Weather Service (mean maxima/minima 2006–2020)

== Demographics ==
Historical population
Census	Pop.	Note	%±
1920	662		—
1930	544		−17.8%
1940	647		18.9%
1950	591		−8.7%
1960	593		0.3%
1970	516		−13.0%
1980	467		−9.5%
1990	420		−10.1%
2000	521		24.0%
2010	407		−21.9%
2020	358		−12.0%
2023 (est.)	375		4.7%
U.S. Decennial Census

=== 2010 census ===
At the 2010 census there were 407 people in 209 households, including 104 families, in the city. The population density was 598.5 inhabitants per square mile (231.1/km^{2}). There were 317 housing units at an average density of 466.2 per square mile (180.0/km^{2}). The racial makeup of the city was 97.5% White, 0.2% African American, 0.2% Native American, 1.2% from other races, and 0.7% from two or more races. Hispanic or Latino of any race were 4.2%.

Of the 209 households 16.3% had children under the age of 18 living with them, 40.2% were married couples living together, 8.1% had a female householder with no husband present, 1.4% had a male householder with no wife present, and 50.2% were non-families. 44.5% of households were one person and 20.6% were one person aged 65 or older. The average household size was 1.95 and the average family size was 2.74.

The median age was 50.9 years. 16.7% of residents were under the age of 18; 6.2% were between the ages of 18 and 24; 19.2% were from 25 to 44; 31.4% were from 45 to 64; and 26.5% were 65 or older. The gender makeup of the city was 48.2% male and 51.8% female.

=== 2000 census ===
At the 2000 census there were 521 people in 232 households, including 125 families, in the city. The population density was 730.7 inhabitants per square mile (282.1/km^{2}). There were 309 housing units at an average density of 433.4 per square mile (167.3/km^{2}). The racial makeup of the city was 96.93% White, 1.15% Native American, 0.19% Asian, 1.34% from other races, and 0.38% from two or more races. Hispanic or Latino of any race were 2.30%.

Of the 232 households 24.1% had children under the age of 18 living with them, 41.8% were married couples living together, 7.8% had a female householder with no husband present, and 45.7% were non-families. 39.7% of households were one person and 19.0% were one person aged 65 or older. The average household size was 2.23 and the average family size was 3.06.

The age distribution was 27.4% under the age of 18, 5.2% from 18 to 24, 26.7% from 25 to 44, 21.9% from 45 to 64, and 18.8% 65 or older. The median age was 40 years. For every 100 females, there were 98.9 males. For every 100 females age 18 and over, there were 97.9 males.

The median household income was $23,472 and the median family income was $38,750. Males had a median income of $38,125 versus $20,313 for females. The per capita income for the city was $16,242. About 16.7% of families and 25.1% of the population were below the poverty line, including 33.6% of those under age 18 and 10.5% of those age 65 or over.

== Transportation ==
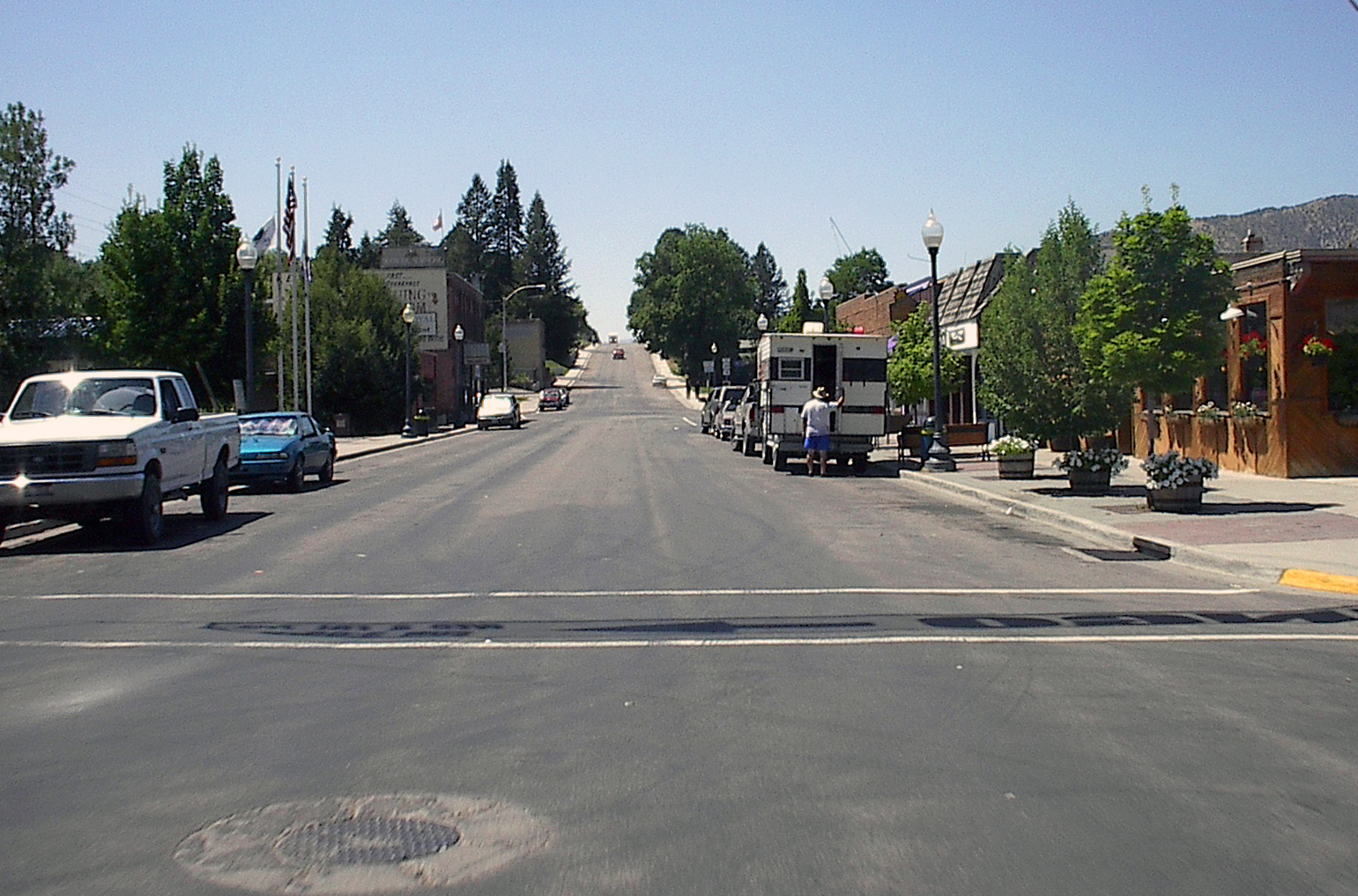
West along Main Street in Lava Hot Springs, July 2003

The primary road through the city is U.S. Route 30 (US 30), which passes just north of the majority of the community. On the northeast corner of the city is the western end of Old Highway 30, which is a former routing of US 30 that runs parallel to and just south of the Union Pacific Railroad (UP) tracks (formerly Oregon Short Line) around the north end of the Fish Creek Range. The current routing of US 30 via Fish Creek Summit reduced the distance between Lava Hot Springs and Soda Springs by about 11 miles (18 km), but bypassed the city of Bancroft. Notwithstanding, the rerouting still created a more direct route between Lava Hot Springs and Bancroft (via Central Road), reducing driving distance between the cities by about 5.5 miles (8.9 km).

== Notable people ==
- Kevin Andrus, member of the Idaho House of Representatives
- Terrel Bell (1921–1996), 2nd United States Secretary of Education (1981–1984)

== See also ==
- Lava Hot Springs (thermal mineral springs)
