= Pueblo Grande de Nevada =

- U.S. National Register of Historic Places
- U.S. Historic district
- Nevada Historical Marker No. 41
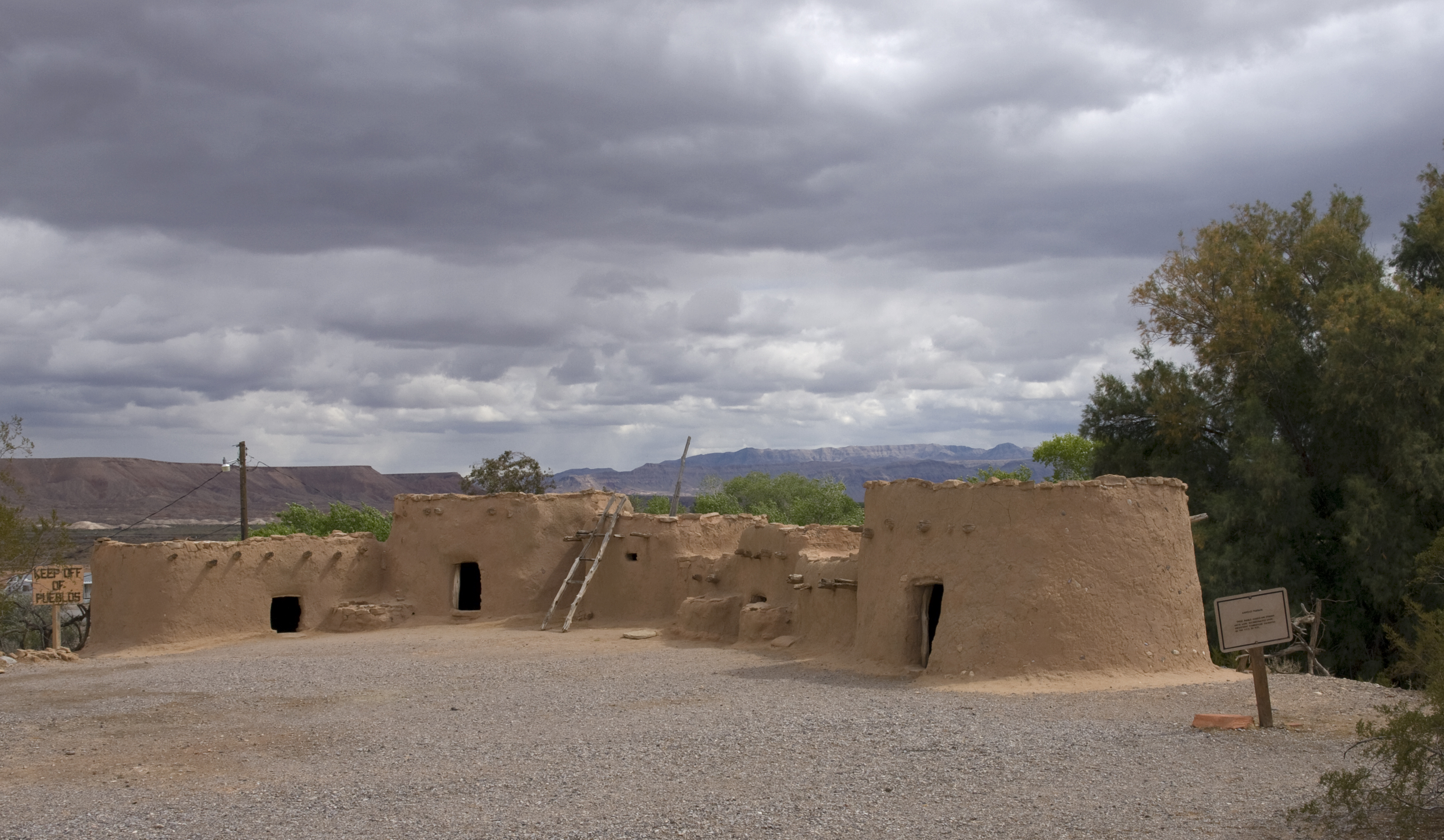
- Lost City Museum

- Location within Nevada Location within the United States
- Location: 5 miles SE of Overton
- Nearest city: Overton, Nevada
- Coordinates: 36°30′01″N 114°24′08″W
- NRHP reference No.: 82000612
- Marker No.: 41
- Added to NRHP: October 8, 1982

Pueblo Grande de Nevada, (26 CK 2148), is a complex of villages located near Overton, Nevada, and listed on the National Register of Historic Places.

== Native American history ==
The site, also known as Nevada's "Lost City", was founded by Basketmaker people about 300 A.D., and was later occupied by other groups and the Ancestral Pueblo until 1150 A.D. The site also shows signs of human occupation as early as 8000 BC.

Some of the houses in the Lost City had up to 20 rooms, with the largest having 174 rooms.

Artifacts from the site are housed in the Lost City Museum.

== Recent history ==
In 1827, Jedediah Smith found various artifacts while exploring in the area.

John and Fay Perkins, when they heard that Governor James Scrugham was looking for such sites to develop for tourism in Nevada, brought this site to the public attention.

Mark Raymond Harrington was the first archaeologist to excavate at the site in 1924, by Scrugham's request.

The Lost City Museum (formerly known as the Boulder Dam Park Museum) was built by the National Park Service in 1935 to exhibit artifacts from Pueblo Grande de Nevada. The most developed sections of the pueblo is partially submerged under the Overton arm of Lake Mead, 5 mi south of Overton as a result of building Boulder Dam.

The site was listed on the National Register of Historic Places on October 8, 1982.

Location of other related ruins:

- 36°29′17″N 114°22′46″W
- 36°28′40″N 114°22′32″W

== See also ==
- List of dwellings of Pueblo peoples
- Category: Native American history of Nevada
- Puebloan peoples

Preceded by Las Vegas Springs	Nevada Historical Markers; 41	Succeeded by Big Smoke Valley
