= Overton, Nevada =

Unincorporated town in the State of Nevada, United States

Overton
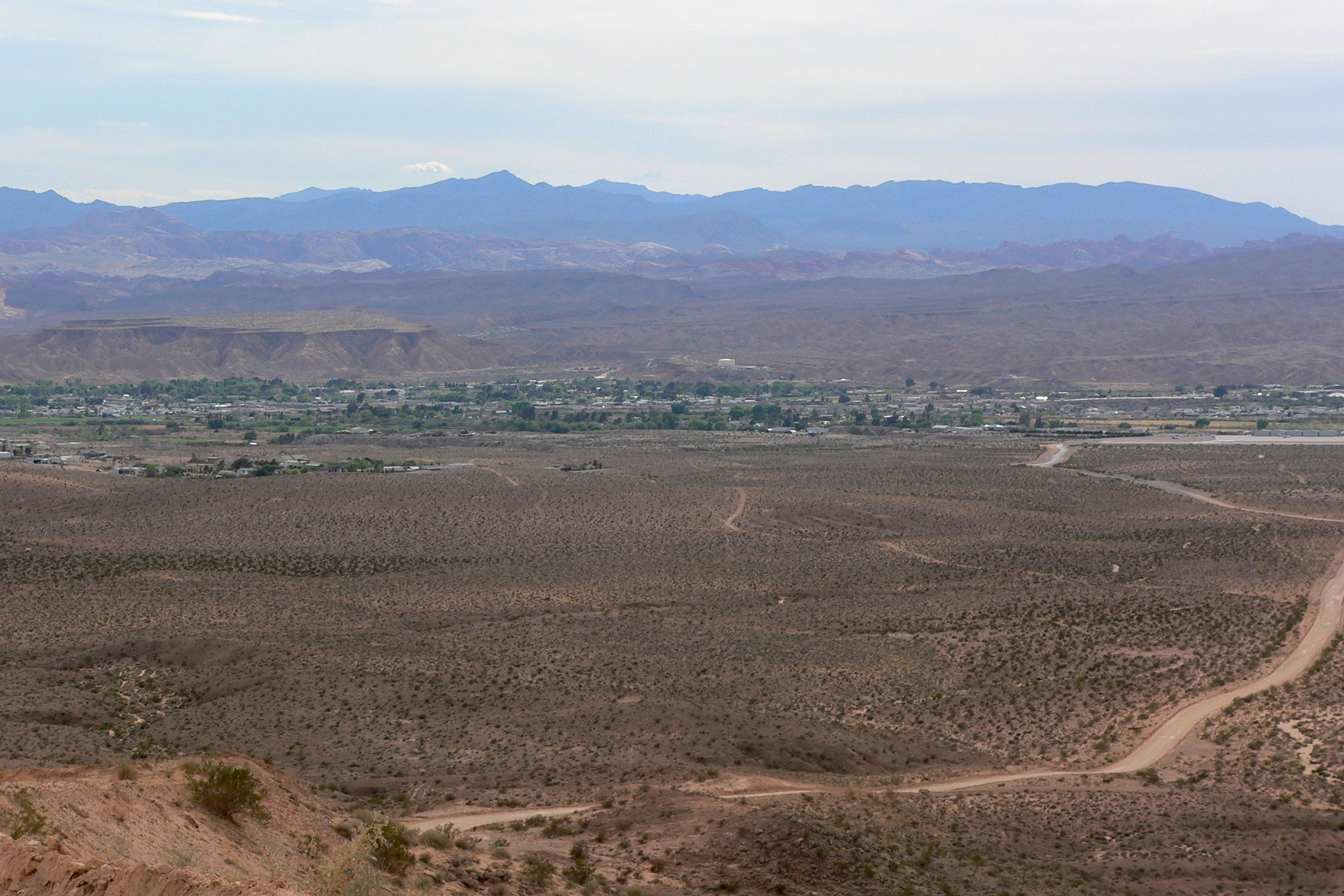
- Overton seen from the edge of Mormon Mesa

- Location within the state of Nevada Overton (the United States)
- Coordinates: 36°32′35″N 114°26′46″W
- Country: United States
- State: Nevada
- County: Clark
- Time zone: UTC-8 (Pacific (PST))
  - Summer (DST): UTC-7 (PDT)
- ZIP code: 89040
- Area codes: 702 and 725

Overton is a community that is part of the unincorporated town of Moapa Valley in Clark County, Nevada. Overton is on the north end of Lake Mead. It is home to Perkins Field airport and Echo Bay Airport.

== History ==
Overton was originally settled in 1869 by members of the Church of Jesus Christ of Latter-day Saints, led by Helaman Pratt. A regular branch was organized there in 1883. In the 1880s, Overton was the location of the only store in the lower Moapa Valley and attracted people from neighboring localities who arrived in Overton to buy supplies. In the 1930s, the town of St. Thomas was submerged by water as Lake Mead was being filled, and the majority of its population relocated to Overton. After that, Overton developed as the main core of the business community in the lower Moapa Valley. It also hosted most of the social events in the area.

In 1980, residents of Overton and the nearby town of Logandale approved a referendum on merging the two towns into the town of Moapa Valley. The Clark County Commission affirmed the vote, legally creating Moapa Valley on February 13, 1981.

== Geography ==
Overton is located in Moapa Valley, 65 mi (105 km) northeast of Las Vegas, Nevada. The town features a landscape of mesas, foothills, and nearby Lake Mead. It is also the settlement closest to Valley of Fire State Park.

=== Climate ===
Overton has a hot desert climate (Köppen: BWh).

Climate data for Overton, Nevada (1991–2020 normals, extremes 1939–1968 and 1992–present)
| Month | Jan | Feb | Mar | Apr | May | Jun | Jul | Aug | Sep | Oct | Nov | Dec | Year |
|---|---|---|---|---|---|---|---|---|---|---|---|---|---|
| Record high °F (°C) | 79 (26) | 85 (29) | 99 (37) | 104 (40) | 116 (47) | 122 (50) | 122 (50) | 120 (49) | 117 (47) | 111 (44) | 91 (33) | 80 (27) | 122 (50) |
| Mean maximum °F (°C) | 72.3 (22.4) | 77.5 (25.3) | 88.0 (31.1) | 97.7 (36.5) | 106.0 (41.1) | 114.7 (45.9) | 118.3 (47.9) | 115.2 (46.2) | 110.1 (43.4) | 99.1 (37.3) | 84.2 (29.0) | 71.2 (21.8) | 118.9 (48.3) |
| Mean daily maximum °F (°C) | 62.1 (16.7) | 66.8 (19.3) | 75.2 (24.0) | 83.1 (28.4) | 93.0 (33.9) | 104.2 (40.1) | 109.4 (43.0) | 107.4 (41.9) | 100.0 (37.8) | 85.8 (29.9) | 71.3 (21.8) | 60.5 (15.8) | 84.9 (29.4) |
| Daily mean °F (°C) | 47.7 (8.7) | 52.2 (11.2) | 59.7 (15.4) | 66.7 (19.3) | 76.2 (24.6) | 85.8 (29.9) | 92.0 (33.3) | 90.4 (32.4) | 82.6 (28.1) | 69.1 (20.6) | 55.4 (13.0) | 46.4 (8.0) | 68.7 (20.4) |
| Mean daily minimum °F (°C) | 33.3 (0.7) | 37.6 (3.1) | 44.1 (6.7) | 50.2 (10.1) | 59.4 (15.2) | 67.5 (19.7) | 74.7 (23.7) | 73.3 (22.9) | 65.1 (18.4) | 52.3 (11.3) | 39.6 (4.2) | 32.4 (0.2) | 52.5 (11.4) |
| Mean minimum °F (°C) | 24.0 (−4.4) | 28.6 (−1.9) | 34.3 (1.3) | 40.2 (4.6) | 47.8 (8.8) | 57.6 (14.2) | 66.1 (18.9) | 64.3 (17.9) | 54.2 (12.3) | 41.5 (5.3) | 29.0 (−1.7) | 22.8 (−5.1) | 21.2 (−6.0) |
| Record low °F (°C) | 8 (−13) | 17 (−8) | 20 (−7) | 17 (−8) | 34 (1) | 39 (4) | 51 (11) | 49 (9) | 40 (4) | 27 (−3) | 16 (−9) | 11 (−12) | 8 (−13) |
| Average precipitation inches (mm) | 0.69 (18) | 0.91 (23) | 0.81 (21) | 0.31 (7.9) | 0.14 (3.6) | 0.05 (1.3) | 0.38 (9.7) | 0.44 (11) | 0.26 (6.6) | 0.48 (12) | 0.47 (12) | 0.64 (16) | 5.58 (142) |
| Average precipitation days (≥ 0.01 in) | 3.7 | 4.1 | 3.0 | 2.1 | 1.3 | 0.6 | 2.0 | 2.2 | 1.4 | 1.9 | 1.7 | 3.4 | 27.4 |
Source: NOAA

== Economy ==
=== Industry ===
Near Overton, there are deposits of magnesite, kaolin, and gypsum. Silica sand is also being produced.

=== Transportation ===
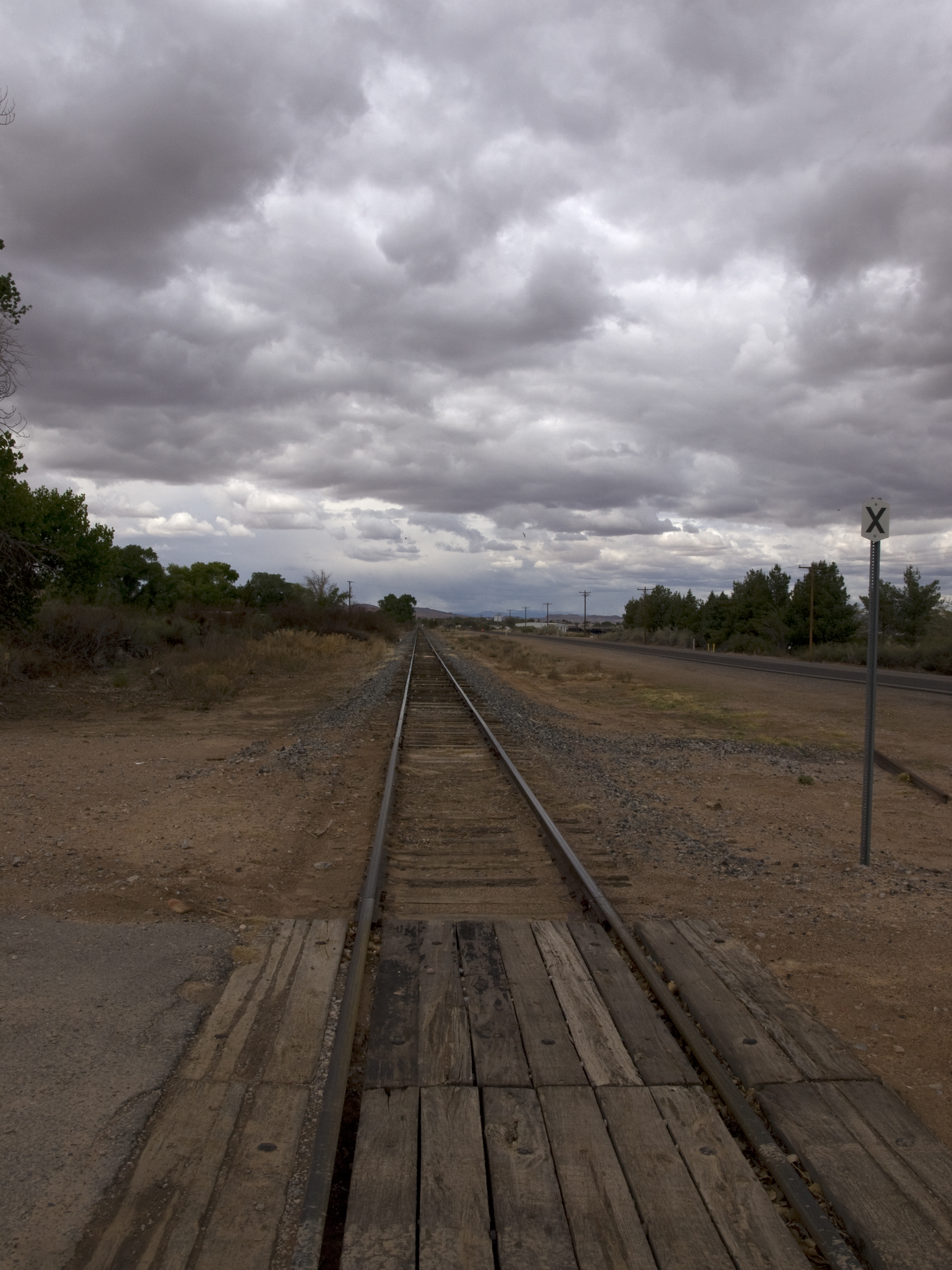
Former St. Thomas Branch of Los Angeles and Salt Lake Railroad in Overton.

Nevada State Route 169 connects Overton with Interstate 15 (exit 93) in the north and Lake Mead National Recreation Area in the south. South of Overton, the highway into Valley of Fire state park (formerly a part of Nevada State Route 169, decommissioned in 2001) branches off west.

Overton is located on the former St. Thomas branch of Los Angeles and Salt Lake Railroad which runs along the Moapa Valley, from north to south. The construction of the branch started in 1911 from Moapa station, which lies on the main line between Salt Lake City and Las Vegas. By March 1912, the construction was completed. In 1919, the railway was made a double track. In 1938 and 1939, the final six-mile segment leading to St. Thomas, which was submerged under waters of Lake Mead, was abandoned. The branch currently extends to the town southern outskirts, serving the gypsum plant. There is no passenger service, but there is freight traffic.

== Attractions ==
- Double Negative is a work of art dug into the ground near Overton.
- Lost City Museum, houses artifacts from Pueblo Grande de Nevada. In particular, a pueblo dwelling has been reconstructed in the inner yard of the museum.
- Overton Wildlife Management Area is located south of Overton and adjacent to Lake Mead National Recreation Area.
- Overton has four entries in the National Register of Historic Places.

- Boulder Dam Park Museum (listed in 1996);
- LDS Moapa Stake Office Building (listed in 2002);
- Overton Gymnasium (listed in 1992);
- St. Thomas Memorial Cemetery (listed in 2005).
- Overton Park (listed in 2024)

Two more entries are located in the vicinity of Overton. These are the wreck of Boeing B-29 Serial No. 45-21847 submerged in Lake Mead and Pueblo Grande de Nevada.

== Notable people ==
- Archie Butler (actor), an actor, stunt man, and crewman in numerous films and television shows, died here February 4, 1977, aged 65
- Glen Jones (1910–1983), sheriff of Clark County
- Betty Willis, visual artist and graphic designer, best known for designing the Welcome to Fabulous Las Vegas sign, born in Overton, Nevada

== In popular culture ==
The novel Lords of St. Thomas (GWP, 2018) by Jackson Ellis tells the story of the last family to vacate nearby St. Thomas, Nevada in 1938 following construction of the Boulder Dam. The book is set partly in Overton, and is where the Lord family relocates to after the flooding of St. Thomas.
