= Vine (disambiguation) =

A vine is typically the grapevine (Vitis), but can refer more generally to any plant with a growth habit of trailing or climbing stems or runners.

Vine or Vines may also refer to:

== Music ==
- "Vine", a 1998 song by Avail from Over the James
- Vine (album), 1999, by Chris Cheek
- "Vine", a 1999 song by Spratleys Japs from Pony
- "Vines", a 2024 song by Cameron Winter from Singles

== Science and technology ==
- Vine (service), a video app owned by Twitter
- Vine Linux, a Linux distribution
- Vinelink.com, styled as VINE, a website that allows people to track the movements of prisoners
- Vine VNC client and server for OS X, part of the Eggplant GUI test automation tool
- Vine Toolkit, an open source software framework used to create web applications
- Amazon Vine, a program of Amazon.com that gives free products to customers in exchange for reviews
- Banyan VINES, a network operating system
- Microsoft Vine, an online service by Microsoft used to keep in touch with people in case of an emergency
- Vine copula, a graphical tool for labeling constraints in high-dimensional probability distributions

== People ==
- Vine (surname)
- Vines (surname)
- Vine, a female professional wrestler from the Gorgeous Ladies of Wrestling

== Places ==
- Vine, Indiana, an unincorporated community in the U.S.
- Vine, Zagorje ob Savi, a settlement in the Municipality of Zagorje ob Savi, central Slovenia
- Vines High School, in Plano, Texas, U.S.

== Pubs ==
- Vine Inn, Manchester, Greater Manchester, England
- Vine Inn, Pamphill, Dorset, England

== Other uses ==
- Vine (demon), in theology, a denizen of Hell
- Vine Theatre, a movie theater in Hollywood, California
- VINE Transit, a public transit system in Napa County
- Vines, a toy in the Beanie Babies 2.0 line
- The Vine (bus rapid transit), a bus rapid transit service in Vancouver, Washington

== See also ==
- Grapevine (disambiguation)
- Vine Street (disambiguation)
- The Vines (disambiguation)
- Wine (disambiguation)
