= The Vines =

The Vines may refer to:

- The Vines, Oxford, a historic house in Oxford, England
- The Vines, Western Australia, a golf course and residential estate in Western Australia
- The Vines (band), an Australian alternative rock band

== See also ==
- Vine (disambiguation)
- Grapevine (disambiguation)
- Vine Street (disambiguation)
- Vine (surname)
- Vines (surname)
