= Avi Kwa Ame National Monument =

U.S. national monument in Nevada

- IUCN category V (protected landscape/seascape)
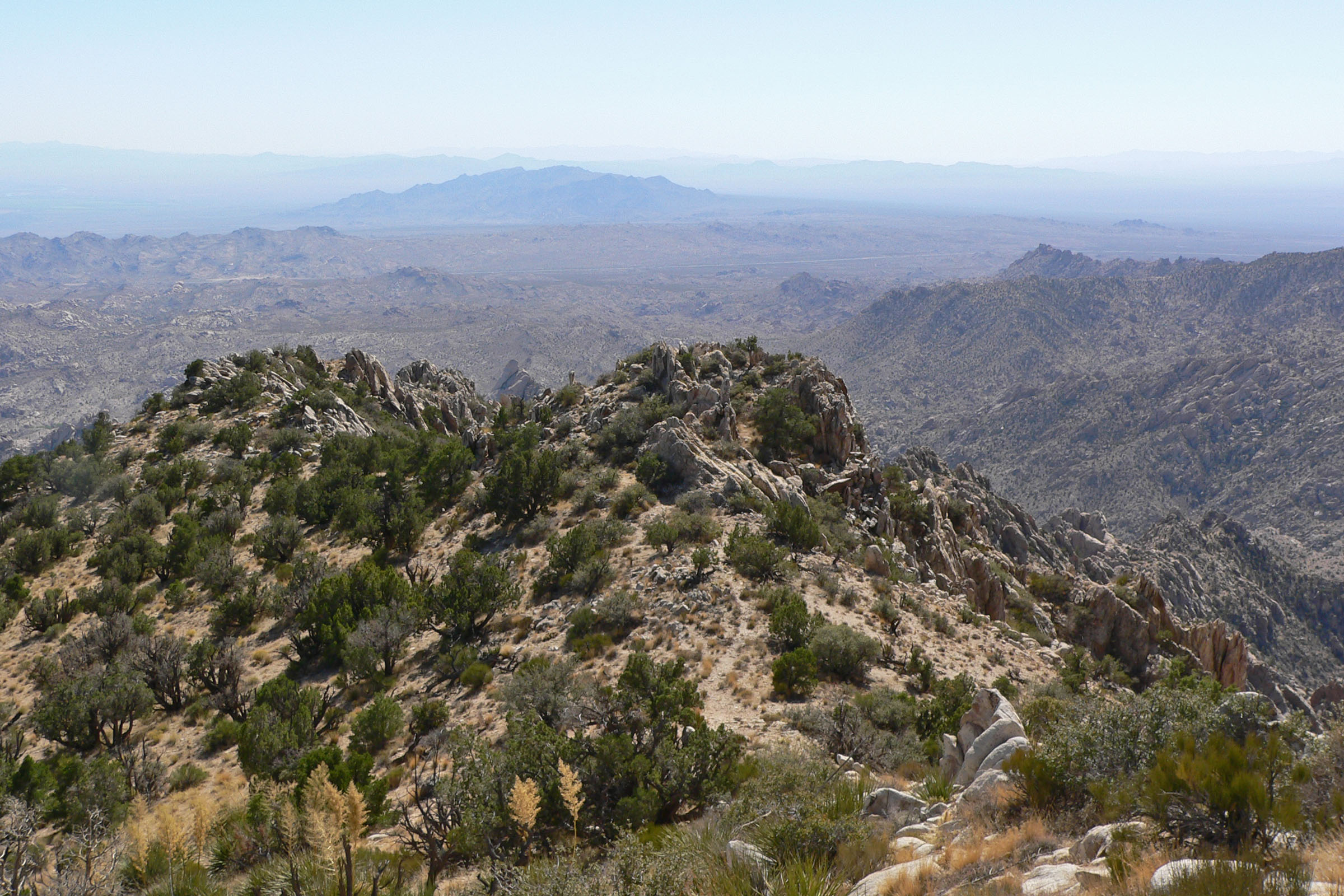
- Summit area of Spirit Mountain (Avi Kwa Ame)

- Location within Nevada Location within the United States
- Interactive map of Avi Kwa Ame National Monument
- Location: Clark County, Nevada, United States
- Nearest city: Searchlight, Nevada
- Coordinates: 35°24′N 115°00′W
- Area: 506,814 acres (2,051.00 km^{2})
- Established: March 21, 2023
- Governing body: Bureau of Land Management
- Website: https://www.blm.gov/avi-kwa-ame-national-monument

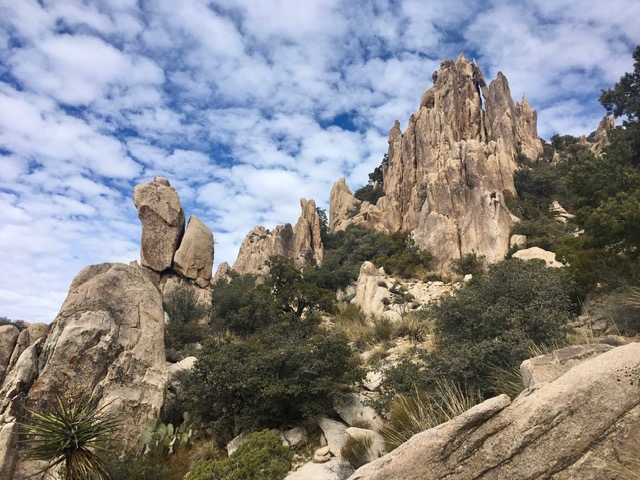
Avi Kwa Ame, also known as Spirit Mountain

Avi Kwa Ame National Monument (/əˌviːkwəˈɑːmeɪ/ ə-VEE kwə AH-may; Mojave: ʔaviː kʷaʔame, "highest mountain", from ʔaviː, "mountain, rock", and ʔamay, "up, above") is a national monument that protects approximately 506,000 acres (2,050 km^{2}) of the Mojave Desert in southern Nevada. President Joe Biden established it as a monument under the authority of the Antiquities Act on March 21, 2023. It is named for Avi Kwa Ame, also known as Spirit Mountain, which is visible from most of the monument and is considered sacred as the site of creation by the Yuman tribes. Most of the monument is managed by the Bureau of Land Management as part of the National Conservation Lands, and the National Park Service manages the portion within Lake Mead National Recreation Area.

== Geography ==
The area protected includes portions of the Newberry Mountains, Eldorado Mountains, New York Mountains, McCullough Range, and Dead Mountains, as well as most of the Piute Valley and Eldorado Valley which separate them. The monument surrounds excluded areas around the towns of Searchlight, Palm Gardens and Cal-Nev-Ari, Nevada.

The monument includes all of the Spirit Mountain, South McCullough, Wee Thump Joshua Tree, Nellis Wash, and Bridge Canyon wilderness areas and a portion of Ireteba Peaks Wilderness. It borders Lake Mead National Recreation Area, Mojave Trails National Monument, Mojave National Preserve, and Castle Mountains National Monument thereby creating a much larger contiguously protected area of the Mojave Desert.

The Hiko Springs and Grapevine Canyon areas have Native American petroglyphs, some of which have already been worn off.

The Mojave Road section of the Old Spanish National Historic Trail passes through the monument.

== Flora and fauna ==
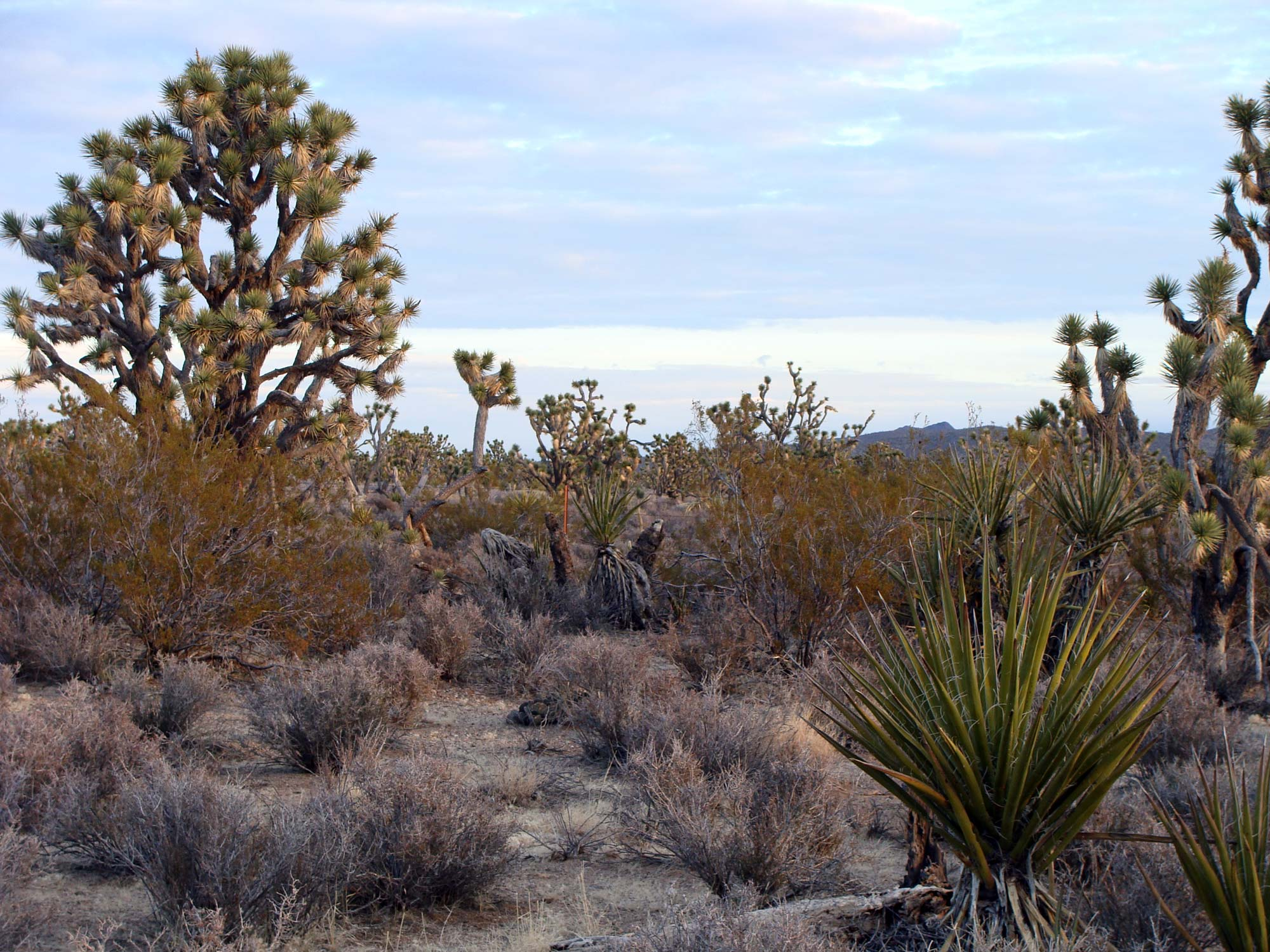
Wee Thump Joshua Tree Wilderness

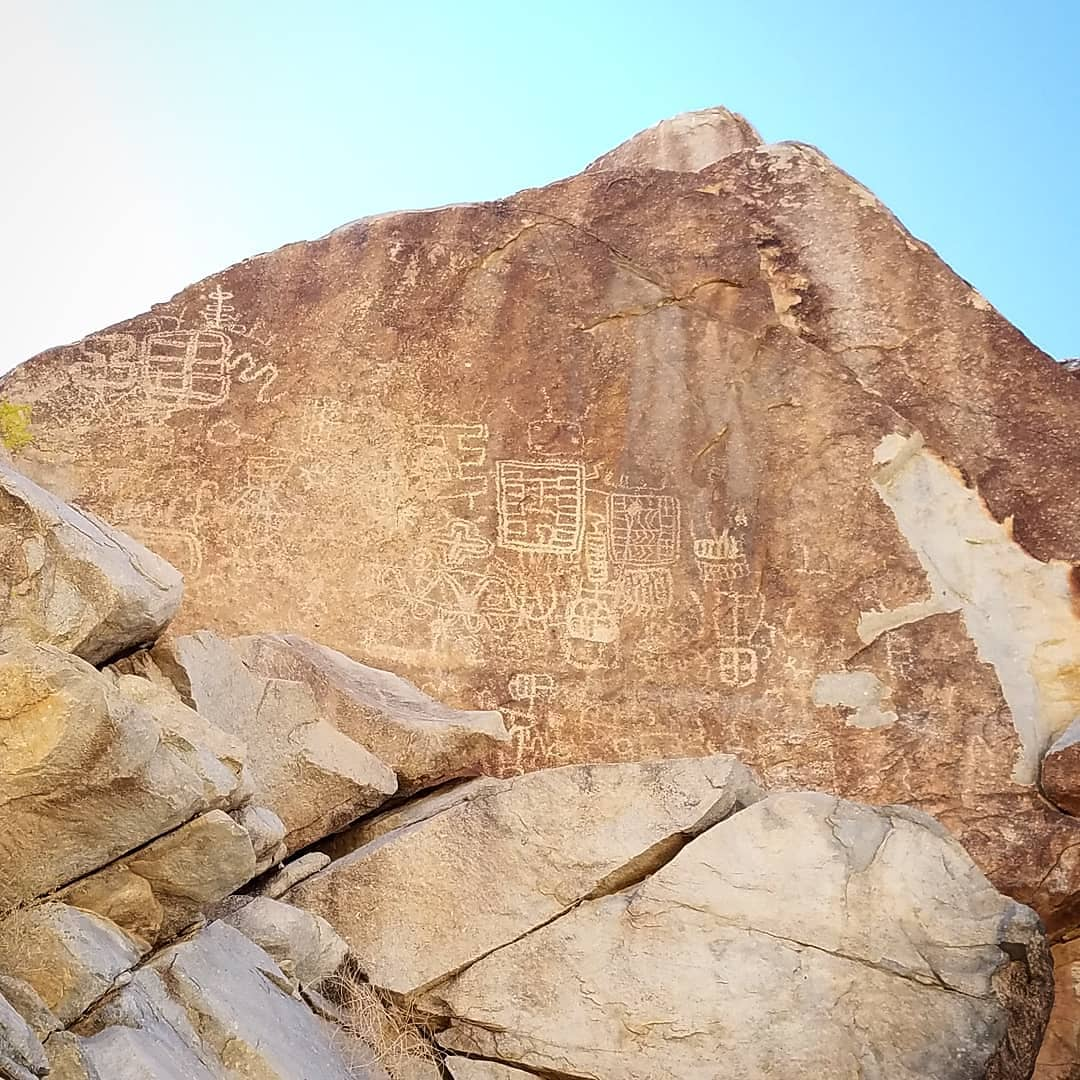
Grapevine Canyon Petroglyphs, in the Avi Kwa Ame National Monument

Significant species that live in the desert include desert bighorn sheep, desert tortoise, and golden eagles. The Mojave Desert has more than 200 endemic plants. A significant habitat of the Joshua Tree is in the western portion of the monument. The majority of the area (330,000 acres) was designated as the Piute/Eldorado Area of Critical Environmental Concern in 1996 to conserve critical habitat for the threatened desert tortoise.

== National monument designation ==
The Fort Mojave Indian Tribe has long advocated for the protection of the region's natural and cultural resources. Spirit Mountain was listed on the National Register of Historic Places in 1999. After a proposed large-scale wind farm faced opposition from local Searchlight residents, residents and tribal groups began a push for national monument designation in 2020. The Clark County Commission voted unanimously to support the monument. In February 2022 U.S. Representative Dina Titus introduced a bill that would have designated Avi Kwa Ame as a national monument. Interior Secretary Deb Haaland visited the area to discuss the region's significance in September, before BLM director Tracy Stone-Manning hosted a town hall meeting in November. On November 30, 2022, President Biden announced to attendees of the White House Tribal Nations Summit that he was committed to protecting the area around Spirit Mountain.

Though most of the proposed boundaries already excluded wind energy, the monument designation prevents the development of new wind and solar power, putting land conservation in contention with reducing emissions. Previous proposals for a wind farm had been blocked by the Bureau of Land Management, and the creation of the monument ended speculation for the revised 308 MW Kulning Wind Energy Project. Solar power developers requested that an area near Laughlin, Nevada, be excluded for the proposed 2,500 acre, 400 MW Angora Solar Project, which would have transmission to the former Mohave Power Station, but this carve-out was not included in the final monument designation.

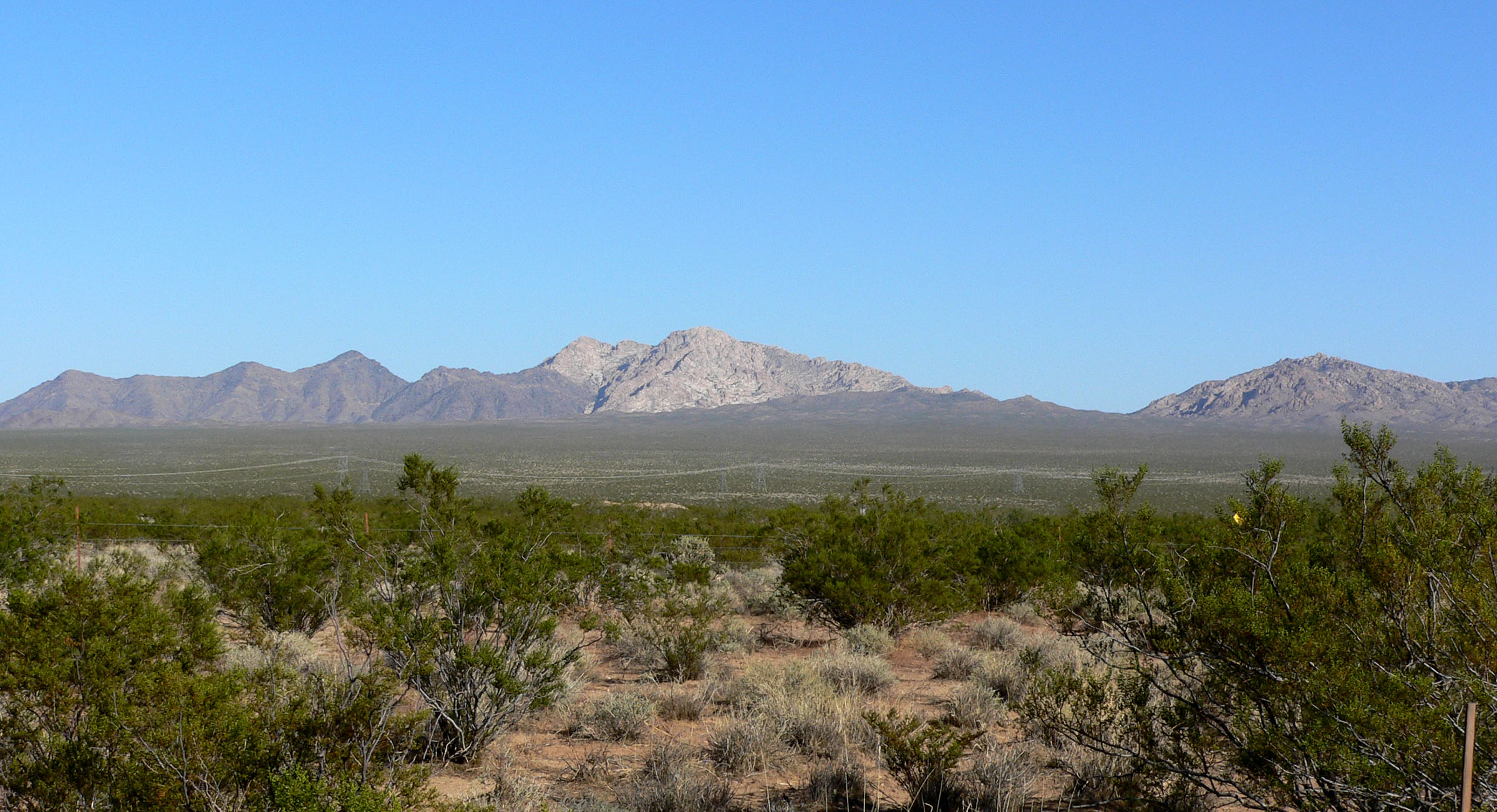
The Newberry Mountains from the Eldorado Valley, with Spirit Mountain at center

President Biden announced the creation of the monument at the White House Conservation in Action Summit with tribal leaders on March 21, 2023, along with Castner Range National Monument. There was a delay of more than three months in designating the monument after President Biden said he would do so, in part due to difficulties in scheduling an event in Nevada to make the proclamation. Local reporters expected Biden to make the designation on a trip to Las Vegas on March 14, but plans changed when members of Congress were unable to attend. Part of President Biden's 30 by 30 conservation goals, Avi Kwa Ame was his largest act of land protection, surpassing Camp Hale—Continental Divide National Monument, until he designated Baaj Nwaavjo I'tah Kukveni – Ancestral Footprints of the Grand Canyon National Monument in August. The final monument designation was slightly larger than the approximately 450,000 acres (1,800 km^{2}) proposed by advocates, as it also included three wilderness areas already protected within Lake Mead National Recreation Area, including Spirit Mountain itself.

The monument is managed by the Bureau of Land Management (BLM) and the National Park Service; it is not a unit of Park Service, as its portion overlaps Lake Mead National Recreation Area. Small areas are owned by the Bureau of Reclamation and will be transferred to the BLM.

In recognition of Indigenous influence on the area, the monument will have an advisory committee with a majority of members belonging to Tribal Nations, and the Tribal Nations will be involved in co-stewardship of the monument similar to the management of Bears Ears National Monument.

== See also ==
- List of national monuments of the United States
