= Grapevine (disambiguation) =

Grapevine is the common name for plants of the genus Vitis.

Other meanings include:

== Terminology ==
- Double fisherman's knot, used to join two lengths of rope
- Gossip, a term often used to describe a form of communication by means of gossip or rumor, as in "heard it through the grapevine"
- Leglock in wrestling, grappling, and martial arts; a practitioner wrapping their legs around a limb or limbs of their opponent to gain control or leverage
- Grapevine (dance move), dance figure in partner dancing
- Beep line, an improvised telephone chat line hosted over busy signals

== Media ==
- The Grapevine, a website operated by The Root
- Grapevine (internet service provider), an internet service provider based in Canberra, Australia
- The Reykjavík Grapevine, an English language Icelandic magazine based in Reykjavík
- The Grapevine (newspaper), a publication in the Annapolis Valley, Nova Scotia
- Homeless Grapevine, a street newspaper in Cleveland
- Grapevine (TV series), a 1992 American program
- A segment on the TV show Special Report with Bret Baier
- "I Heard It Through the Grapevine", a 1967 song recorded by various Motown artists
- "Grapevine" (Tiësto song), 2018
- "Grapevine" (Weyes Blood song), from And In The Darkness, Hearts Aglow, 2022

== Places ==
- The Grapevine, a steep grade on Interstate 5 in California between Grapevine, California and Tejon Pass
- Grapevine, California
- Grapevine, Arkansas
- Grapevine, Kentucky
- Grapevine, Texas
  - Grapevine High School
- Grapevine Airstrip
- Grapevine Canyon
- Grapevine Creek
- Grapevine Hills
- Grapevine Lake
- Grapevine Mountains
  - Grapevine Peak

== Other uses ==
- Grapevine cross, a major symbol of the Georgian Orthodox Church
- Senecio tamoides, a climbing plant that is known as "false grapevine"

== See also ==
- Grapevine moth (disambiguation)
- Grape (disambiguation)
- Vine (disambiguation)
