= Grapevine Canyon =

Grapevine Canyon may refer to:

- Grapevine Canyon (Kern County, California), the original Spanish name was La Cañada de las Uvas.
- Grapevine Canyon (Death Valley)
- Grapevine Canyon (Nevada)
  - Grapevine Canyon Petroglyphs
- Grapevine Canyon (San Diego County), a tributary of San Felipe Creek

== See also ==
- Grapevine (disambiguation)
