= Grapevine Canyon (Nevada) =

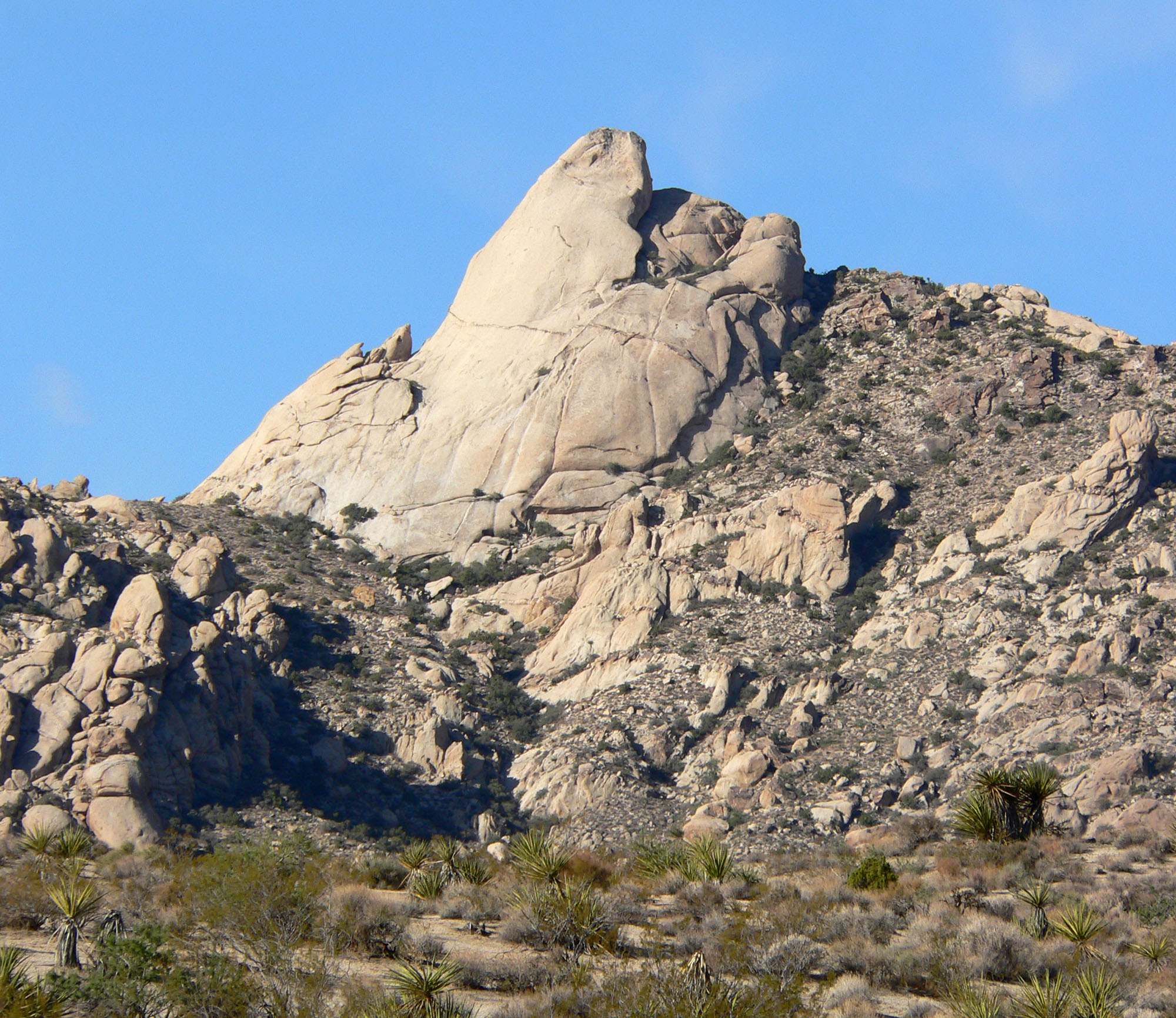
- Grapevine Canyon

- Location within Nevada

Geography
- Country: United States
- State: Nevada
- District: Clark County
- Coordinates: 35°13′37″N 114°41′10″W
- Interactive map of Grapevine Canyon

Grapevine Canyon is located in the Bridge Canyon Wilderness Area and the Spirit Mountain Wilderness within Lake Mead National Recreation Area. The canyon contains the Grapevine Canyon Petroglyphs and is accessible from Nevada State Route 163 which leads to Lower Grapevine Canyon Road. During non-drought years, the canyon contains a fresh water spring. The spring provides water for shrubbery along its path.

While it was used by the Mohave people, the canyon may have served as a ritual location and for summer solstice observations. Various petroglyphs serve as evidence of use by the Mohave people
