= Grapevine Canyon Petroglyphs =

- Grapevine Canyon Petroglyphs (AZ:F:14:98 ASM)
- U.S. National Register of Historic Places
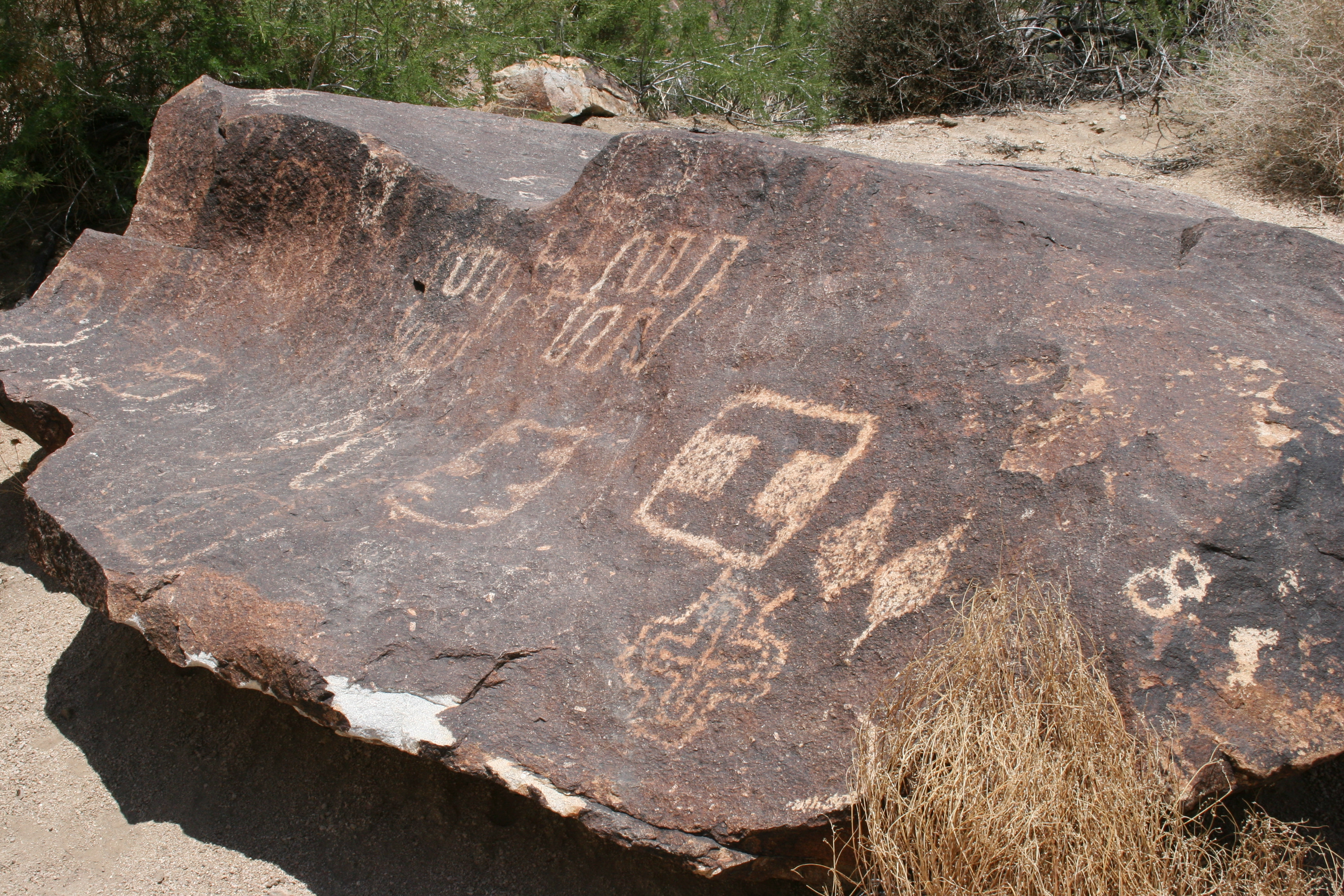
- Petroglyphs on a rock in Grapevine Canyon.
- Nearest city: Laughlin, Nevada
- Coordinates: 35.2271°N 114.6856°W
- NRHP reference No.: 84000799
- Added to NRHP: December 15, 1984

The Grapevine Canyon Petroglyphs are located in Grapevine Canyon on Spirit Mountain near Laughlin, Nevada, and are listed on the United States National Register of Historic Places. The area is also known as Christmas Tree Pass. While the petroglyphs extend through the canyon, a significant concentration lies at the entrance to the canyon which is at an elevation of 2,395 feet (730 m). The area features over 700 petroglyphs and many rock shelters.

== History ==
The glyphs were created between 1100 and 1900 AD. Both the meaning of the glyphs and their creators remains unclear although the area was inhabited by the Mojave.

The site was listed on the National Register of Historic Places on December 15, 1984. Mapping of the estimated 250 panels of glyphs was conducted in 2009.

In March 2010, David R. Smith, accompanied by two other individuals, defaced 30 areas of petroglyphs by shooting them with an automatic paintball gun. He was sentenced to serve time in federal prison and pay almost $10,000 in restitution.

== Grapevine Canyon ==
The canyon itself is located in the Bridge Canyon Wilderness and the Spirit Mountain Wilderness as well as partially being in the Lake Mead National Recreation Area. There is a brief hike to reach the canyon itself from the parking lot.

The majority of the petroglyphs are located near the entrance of the canyon and within its immediate interior, with additional petroglyphs located on the left and right of the entrance. There is a path which leads into the canyon, but there are only a few petroglyphs located deeper into the canyon.

== Images ==
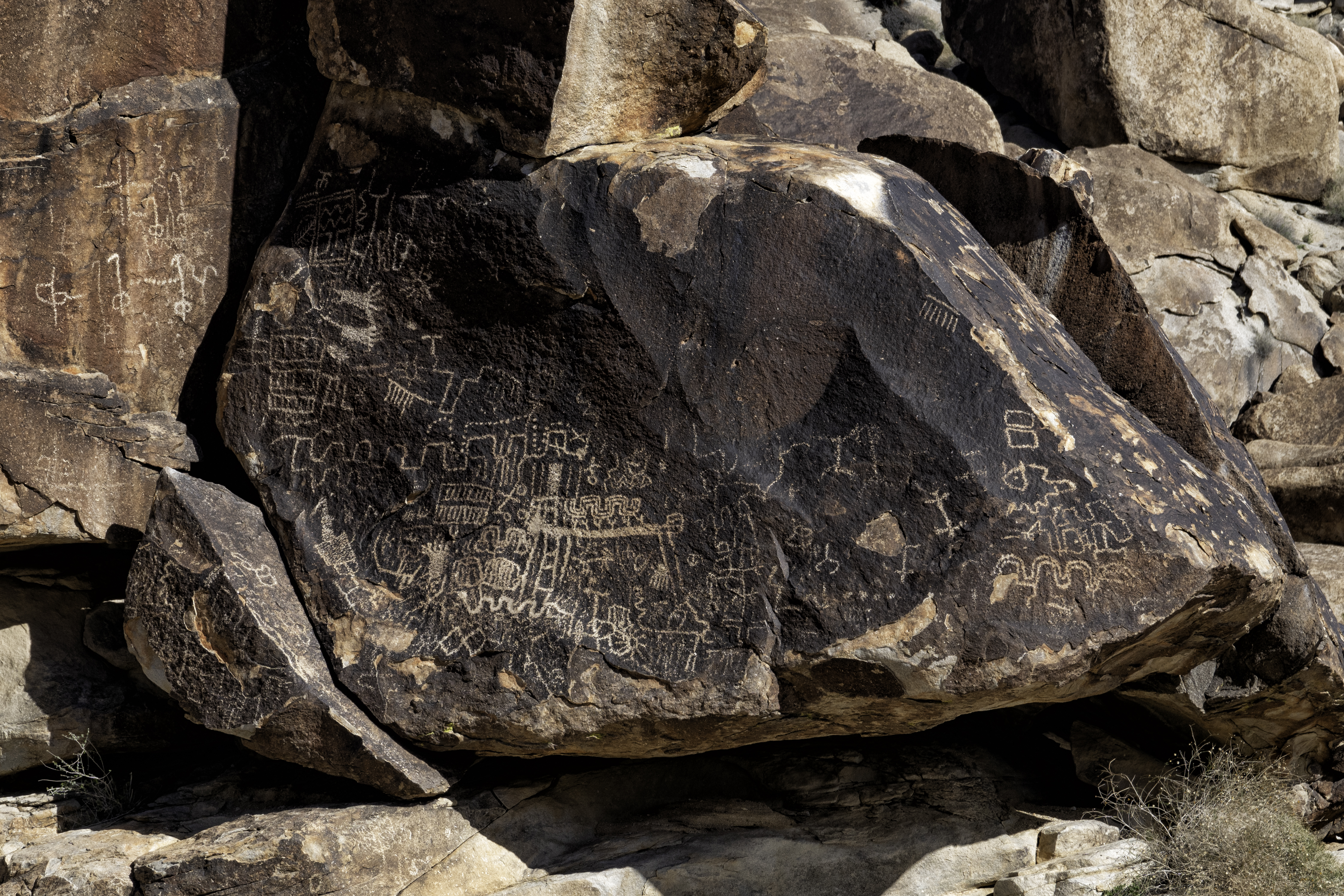
Grapevine Canyon Rock Art

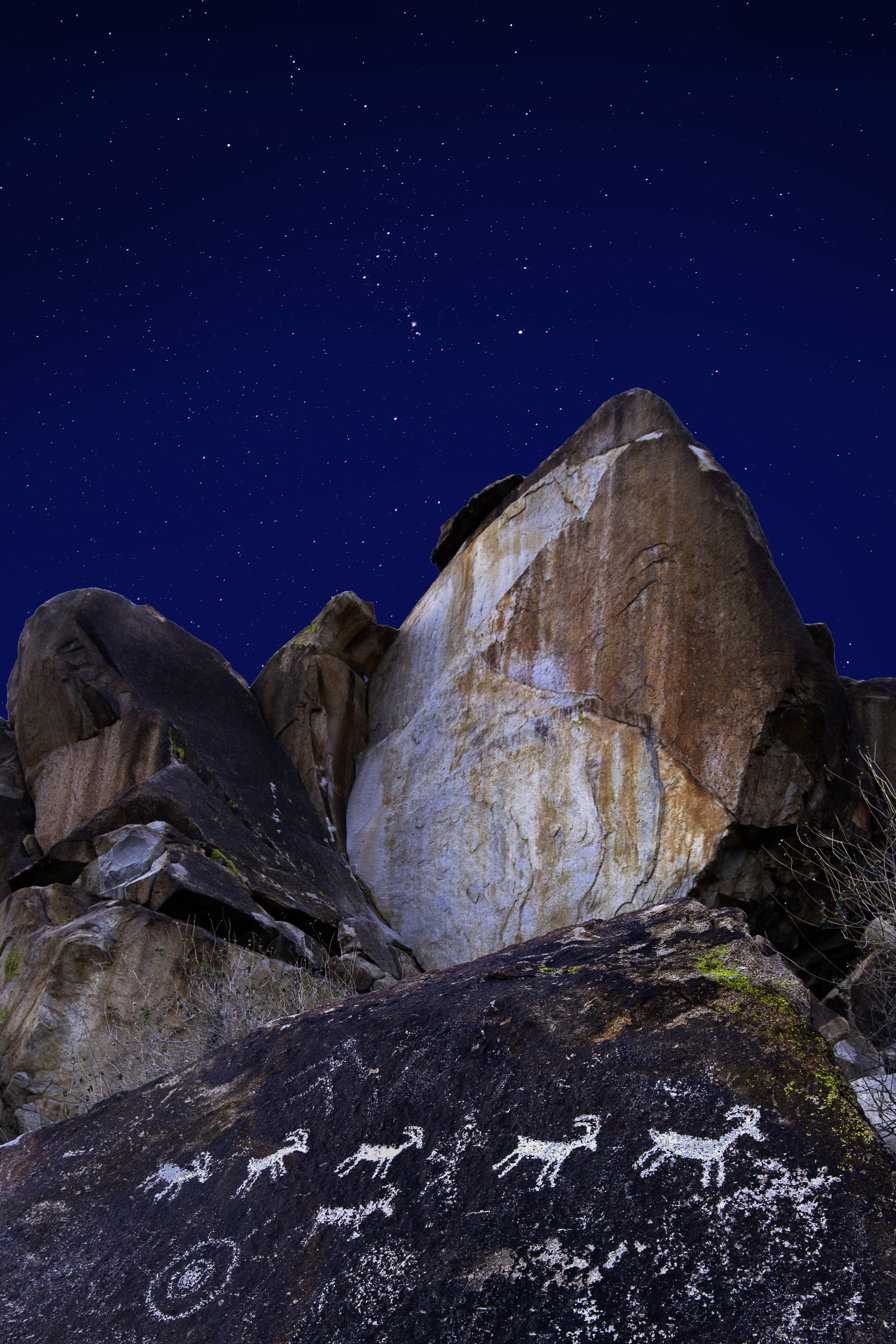
Bighorn sheep petroglyphs

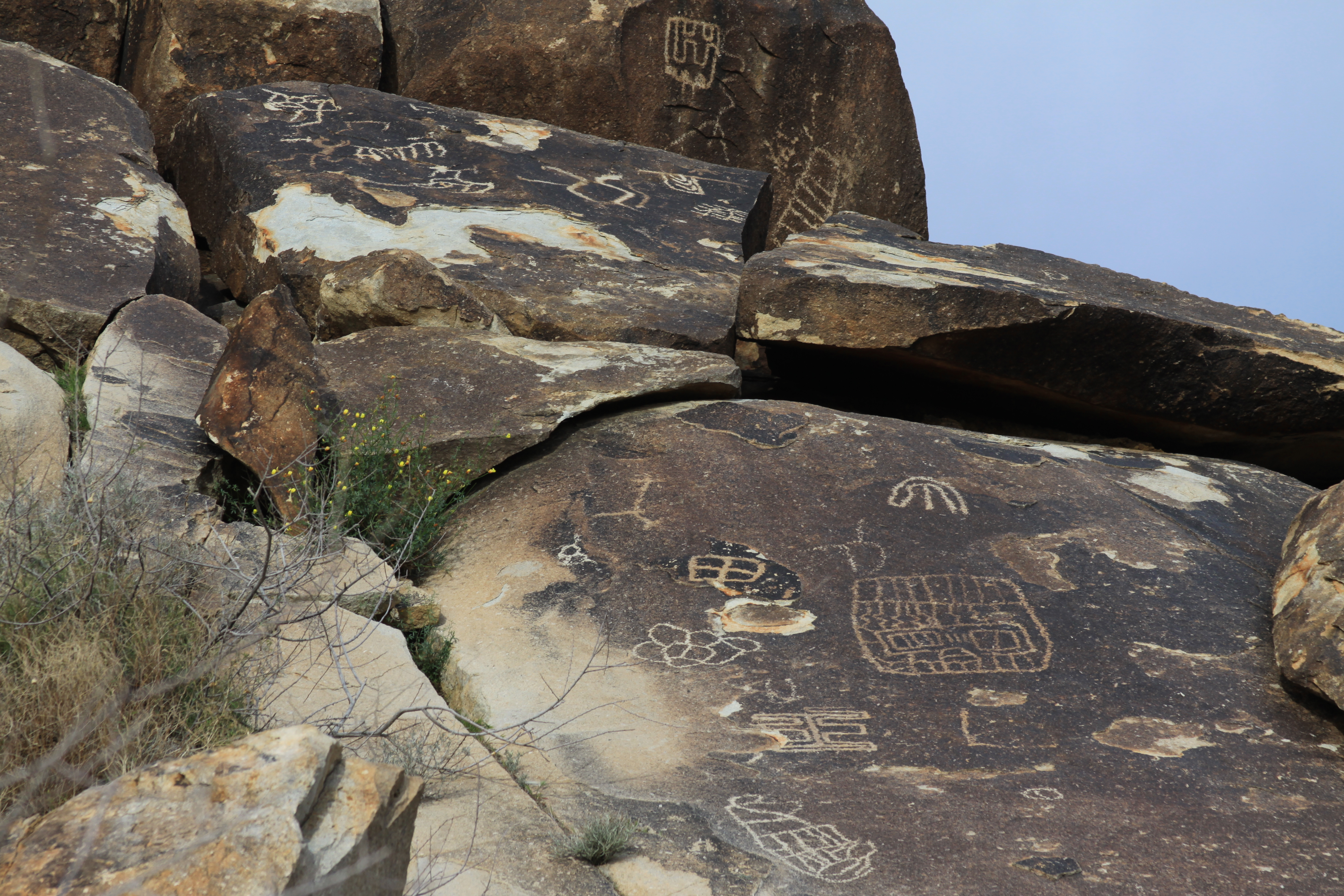
Desert rock art panels

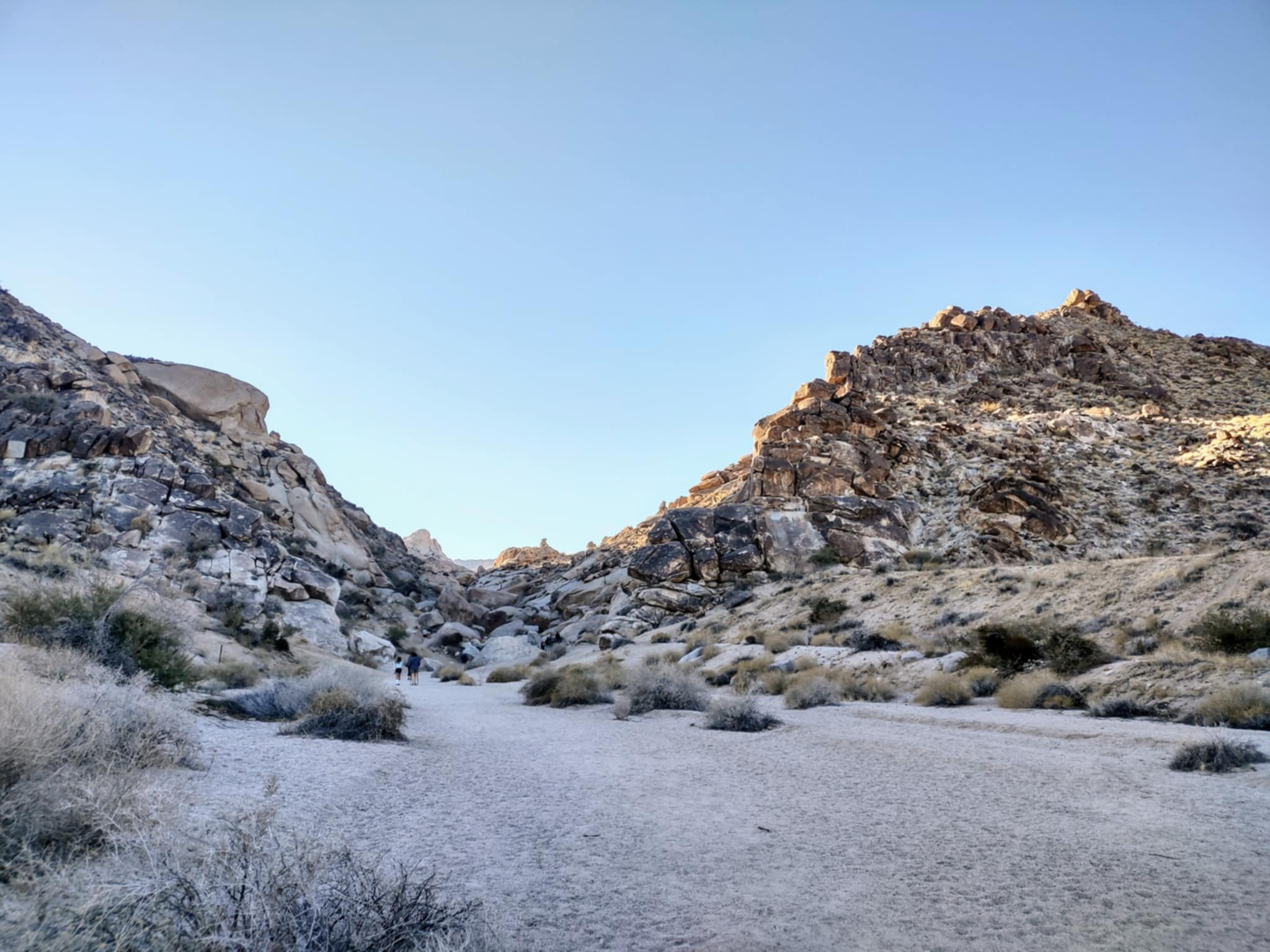
Grapevine Canyon Entrance
