= Nellis Wash Wilderness =

Wilderness area in Nevada

- IUCN category Ib (wilderness area)
- Location within the United States
- Location: Clark County, Nevada, USA
- Coordinates: 35°23′22.04″N 114°44′24.9″W
- Area: 16,423 acres (66.46 km^{2})
- Established: 2002
- Governing body: National Park Service

Nellis Wash Wilderness is a 16,423 acre (6,646 ha) wilderness area located on the eastern side of the Newberry Mountains and extends eastward towards Lake Mohave. It shares a border with the Spirit Mountain Wilderness on its southern point. Nellis Wash Wilderness was designated as a wilderness area in 2002 and is managed by the National Park Service in Lake Mead National Recreation Area. It is also within Avi Kwa Ame National Monument.

== Geography ==
During the summer, temperatures could reach as high as 120 °F (48.9 °C). The area has a mostly desert-based terrain with no fresh water source nearby. The area shows signs of historical mining activity. Vegetation that can be found in the area includes creosote bush and catclaw acacia. Some faunas that are native to the location are black-tailed jackrabbits, horned lizards, and kangaroo rats.

== See also ==
- List of wilderness areas in the United States
