= Geina integumentum =

Scientific classification
- Domain: Eukaryota
- Kingdom: Animalia
- Phylum: Arthropoda
- Class: Insecta
- Order: Lepidoptera
- Family: Pterophoridae
- Genus: Geina
- Species: G. integumentum

Binomial name
- Geina integumentum Gielis, 2006

Species of plume moth

Geina integumentum is a species of moth in the genus Geina known from Puerto Rico and the Virgin Islands. Moths of this species take flight in July and August and have a wingspan of about 11–12 millimetres. The specific name "integumentum" refers to a "cover" over the ostium of the female.
