= Bridge Canyon Wilderness =

Protected area in Nevada, United States

- IUCN category Ib (wilderness area)
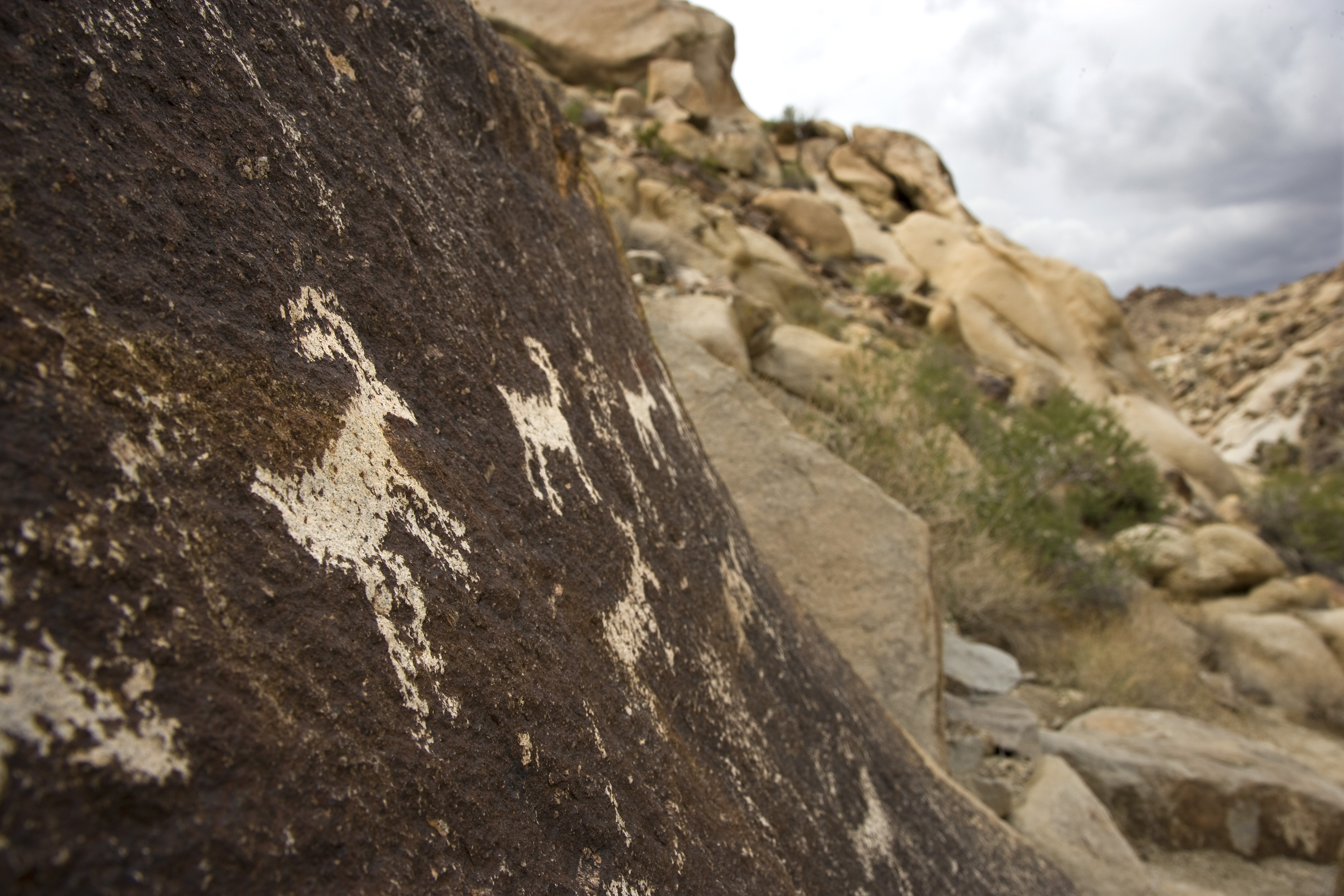
- Petroglyphs in the Bridge Canyon Wilderness Area

- Location within Nevada Location within the United States
- Location: Clark County, Nevada
- Nearest city: Bullhead City, Arizona
- Coordinates: 35.22944°N 114.69722°W
- Area: 7,761 acres (31.41 km^{2})
- Designated: 2002
- Governing body: National Park Service

The Bridge Canyon Wilderness is a small wilderness area located in the Newberry Mountains in southern Nevada, United States, in the Lake Mead National Recreation Area. It is also within Avi Kwa Ame National Monument. The rock outcrops and caves make this area very striking. Stands of cottonwood trees can be found along the Grapevine Wash and Sacatone Wash water courses. Canyon grape, cattails and rushes grow in Grapevine Canyon. Reptiles include the Western chuckwalla, side-blotched lizard, and Gila monster.

== Characteristics ==
The Wilderness covers an area of 7,761 acres (3,141 ha), with elevations rising to 5,600 feet (1,700 m). Bridge Canyon is situated approximately 75 miles (121 km) south of Las Vegas and 7 miles (11 km) west of Laughlin.

== NWPS ==
Bridge Canyon Wilderness became part of the National Wilderness Preservation System in 2002.

== See also ==
- Grapevine Canyon (Nevada)
- Grapevine Canyon Petroglyphs
