= Pamphill =

Village in Dorset, England

Coordinates: 50°48′N 2°1′W

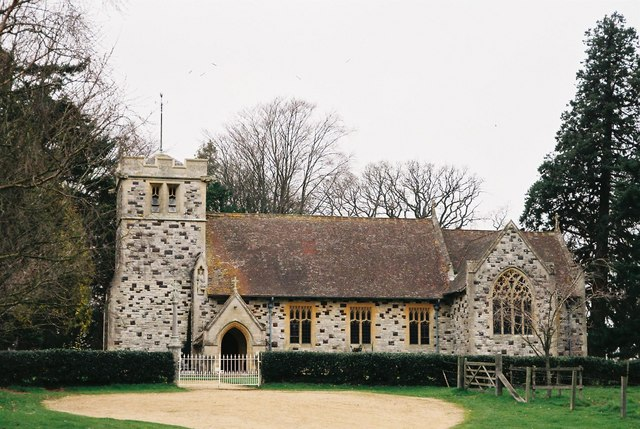
St Stephens Church, Pamphill

Pamphill is a village and civil parish in south-east Dorset, England, just outside Wimborne Minster, four miles north of Poole. The village has a population of 704 (2001).

== Church of St Stephen ==
In its current form, the Parish church of St Stephen dates from 1908, when it was designed by the architect Charles Ponting to serve the Bankes family of Dorset as their place of worship. The village of Pamphill was in their estate at this time.

== Pamphill First School ==
First built in 1695, the school was only the central part of the building, meaning a very low capacity, with adjoining almshouses on either side. It was built through the will of Roger Gillingham of the Middle Temple, who left property in Bedfordshire, Hackney and Stepney to trustees, in assurance that they would raise £400 for a close next to Pamphill Green. It has continued over the years with the almshouses becoming classrooms and, closer to now, building work to make more room. An inscription on the outside of the school reads:

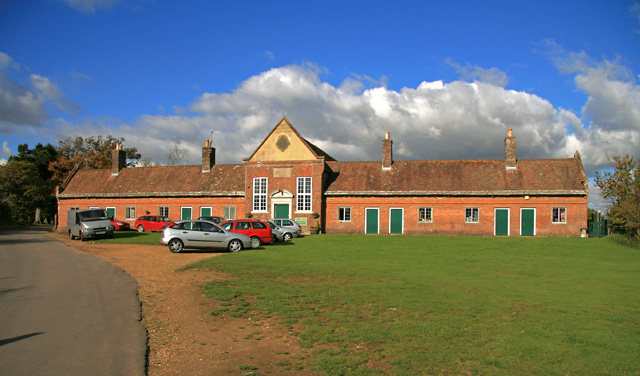
Pamphill First School

To God & ye poor
The pious & charitable gift of
ROGER GILLINGHAM
of the Middle Temple, London, Esq.
This free writing school & ye almshouse adjoining
Were built by ALDRICH SWAN clerk & Rector
of Kington Magna in this county & one of the
Ministers of the parish & Pursuant to the Gift
of Trust of the said Roger Gillingham
Ao Doi 1698

== The Vine Inn ==
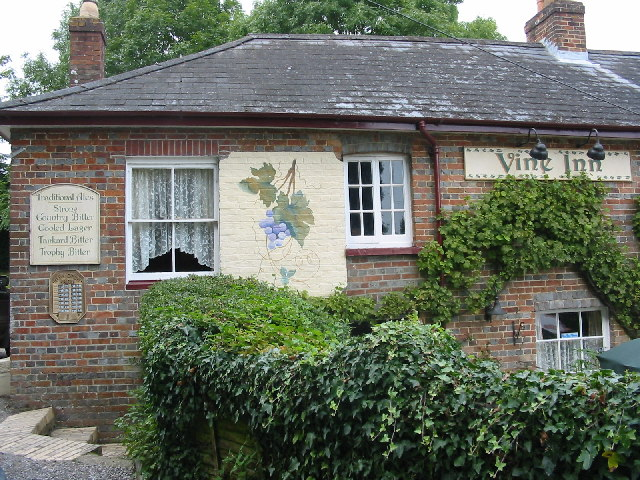
The Vine Inn

The Vine Inn is a public house at Vine Hill, that is on the Campaign for Real Ale's National Inventory of Historic Pub Interiors. It was a bakery until about 1900, when it was refitted as a pub. It is owned by the National Trust.

== Governance ==
The civil parish was included in East Dorset district until its abolition in 2019. It has a group parish council shared with Shapwick, with five councillors representing Pamphill, and four for Shapwick.
