= Grapevine moth =

Grapevine moth or Grape moth may refer to:

- Geina periscelidactyla (the grape plume moth), a moth found in eastern North America
- Lobesia botrana (the European grapevine moth), a tortrix moth
- Nokona regalis (the Japanese grapevine moth), a moth found in Japan
- Phalaenoides glycinae (the Australian grapevine moth), a noctuid moth
- Paralobesia viteana (the grape berry moth), a moth found in Eastern North America and western Colorado
- Oxyptilus regulus (the grape boring plume moth), a moth found in Australia
- Vitacea scepsiformis (the lesser grape root borer moth), a moth found in North America

== See also ==
- Eupoecilia ambiguella, the vine moth, a moth found in Europe and Asia
