= Spirit Mountain (Nevada) =

Mountain in Nevada, United States

- Avi Kwa' Ame
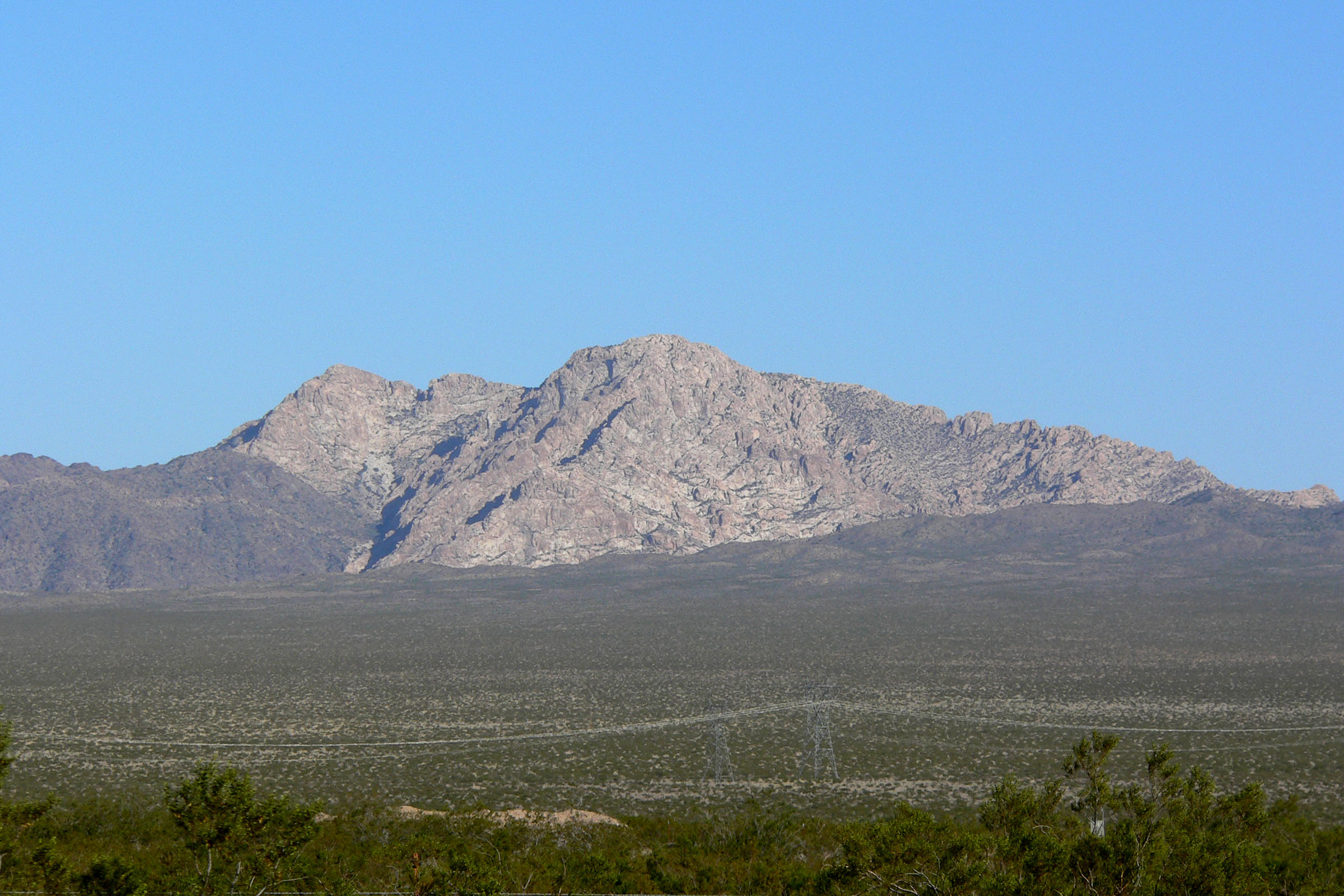
- View from the west

Highest point
- Elevation: 5,642 ft (1,720 m) NAVD 88
- Prominence: 2,879 ft (878 m)
- Isolation: 25.35 mi (40.80 km)
- Listing: Sierra Peaks Section; Great Basin Peaks Section; Desert Peaks Section; Western States Climbers
- Coordinates: 35°16′30″N 114°43′24″W

Geography
- Location: Spirit Mountain Wilderness; Clark County, Nevada, U.S.
- Parent range: Newberry Mountains
- Topo map: USGS Spirit Mountain
- Spirit Mountain
- U.S. National Register of Historic Places
- Nearest city: Laughlin, Nevada
- NRHP reference No.: 99001083
- Added to NRHP: September 8, 1999

Spirit Mountain, also known as Avi Kwa Ame (/əˌviːkwəˈɑːmeɪ/ ə-VEE-kwə-AH-may; Mojave: ʔaviː kʷaʔame, "highest mountain", from ʔaviː, "mountain, rock", and ʔamay, "up, above") is a mountain within the Lake Mead National Recreation Area near Laughlin, Nevada. It is listed on the United States National Register of Historic Places as a sacred place to Native American tribes in Southern Nevada. Spirit Mountain is the highest point in the Spirit Mountain Wilderness and is the highest point in the Newberry Mountains with the summit peak at 5,639 feet (1,719 m).

== History ==
Environmentalists have sought designation of a significant area to the west of the mountain as a national monument. The Avi Kwa Ame National Monument was established on March 21, 2023, by President Biden and named after the peak as the mountain is visible from almost the entire area.

The mountain was listed on the National Register of Historic Places as a Traditional Cultural Property on September 8, 1999.

== Description ==
Spirit Mountain is the center of creation for all Yuman speaking tribes and is considered a sacred area. The 506,814-acre national monument (205,100 ha) is managed by the Bureau of Land Management, National Park Service, and Bureau of Reclamation.
