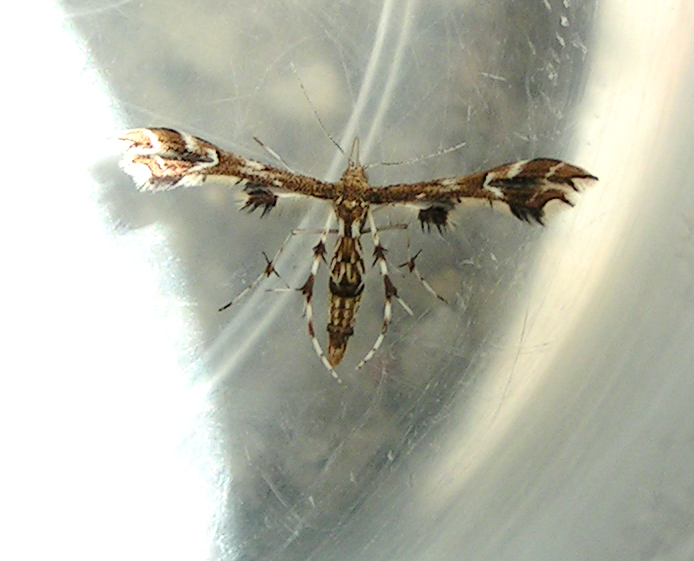

Scientific classification
- Kingdom: Animalia
- Phylum: Arthropoda
- Clade: Pancrustacea
- Class: Insecta
- Order: Lepidoptera
- Family: Pterophoridae
- Genus: Geina
- Species: G. sheppardi

Binomial name
- Geina sheppardi B. Landry, 1989

= Geina sheppardi =

Species of plume moth

Geina sheppardi, or Sheppard's plume moth, is a moth of the family Pterophoridae. It known from western North America, including Mississippi, Ontario and Wisconsin.
