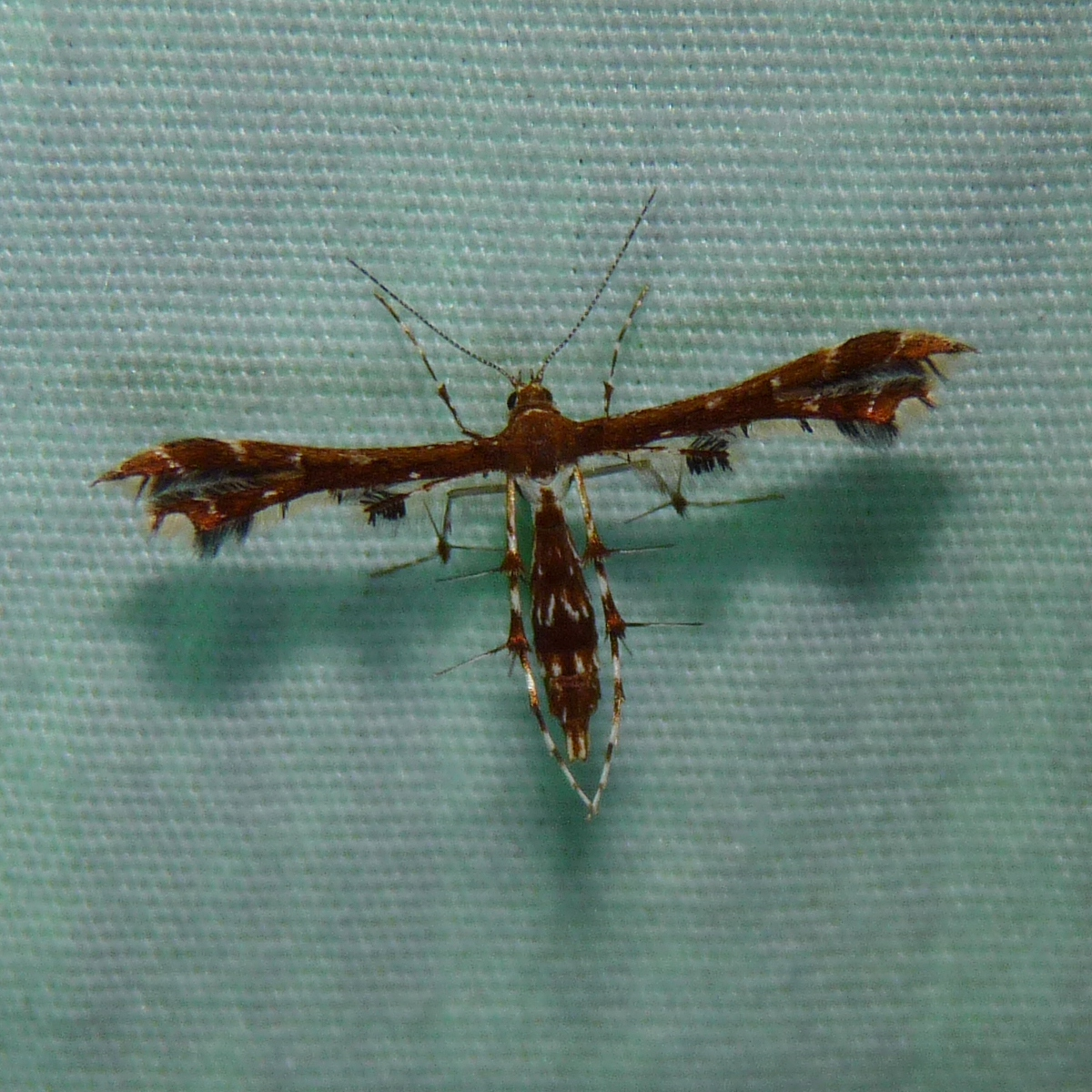

Scientific classification
- Kingdom: Animalia
- Phylum: Arthropoda
- Class: Insecta
- Order: Lepidoptera
- Family: Pterophoridae
- Genus: Geina
- Species: G. tenuidactylus

Binomial name
- Geina tenuidactylus (Fitch, 1854)

Synonyms
- Pterophorus tenuidactyla Fitch, 1855; Oxyptilus nigrociliatus Zeller, 1873; Pterophorus cygnus Barnes & Lindsey, 1921

= Geina tenuidactylus =

Species of plume moth

Geina tenuidactylus, the berry plume moth or Himmelman's plume moth, is a moth of the family Pterophoridae. The species was first described by Asa Fitch in 1854. It is found in North America, including Mississippi, Massachusetts, New York, Delaware, Maryland, West Virginia, Illinois, Ontario, Colorado, Nevada and California.

The wingspan is about 17 mm. Adults have been found feeding on dogbane flowers.

The larvae feed on the buds and leaves of Rubus parviflorus and wild and cultivated blackberries.
