= Grapevine Creek =

Grapevine Creek may refer to one of the following streams:

- Grapevine Creek (Coconino County, Arizona)
- Grapevine Creek (Apache County, Arizona)
- Grapevine Creek (Yavapai County, Arizona)
- Grapevine Creek (Tallapoosa County, Alabama)
- Grapevine Creek (Washington County, Alabama)
- Grapevine Creek (Tulare County, California)
- Grapevine Creek (Sonoma County, California)
- Grapevine Creek (Mendocino County, California)
- Grapevine Creek (Humboldt County, California)
- Grapevine Creek (Tulare County, California)
- Grapevine Creek (Tuolumne County, California)
- Grapevine Creek (Lake County, California)
- Grapevine Creek (San Diego County, California)
- Grapevine Creek (Lake County, California)
- Grapevine Creek (Riverside County, California)
- Grapevine Creek (San Bernardino County, California)
- Grapevine Creek (Santa Barbara County, California)
- Grapevine Creek (Kern County, California)
- Grapevine Creek (Pike County, Kentucky)
- Grapevine Creek (Mercer County, Kentucky)
- Grapevine Creek (Perry County, Kentucky)
- Grapevine Creek (Attala County, Mississippi)
- Grapevine Creek (Big Horn County, Montana)
- Grapevine Creek (Trumbull County, Ohio)
- Grapevine Creek (Real County, Texas)
- Grapevine Creek (Dallas County, Texas)
- Grapevine Creek (Gray County, Texas)
- Grapevine Creek (Wise County, Texas)
- Grapevine Creek (Gray County, Texas)
- Grapevine Creek (Dickens County, Texas)
- Grapevine Creek (Wilbarger County, Texas)
- Grapevine Creek (Moore County, Texas)
- Grapevine Creek (Wise County, Texas)
- Grapevine Creek (Mingo County, West Virginia)
- Grapevine Creek (Kanawha County, West Virginia)
