= Wee Thump Joshua Tree Wilderness =

Protected area in Nevada, United States

- IUCN category Ib (wilderness area)
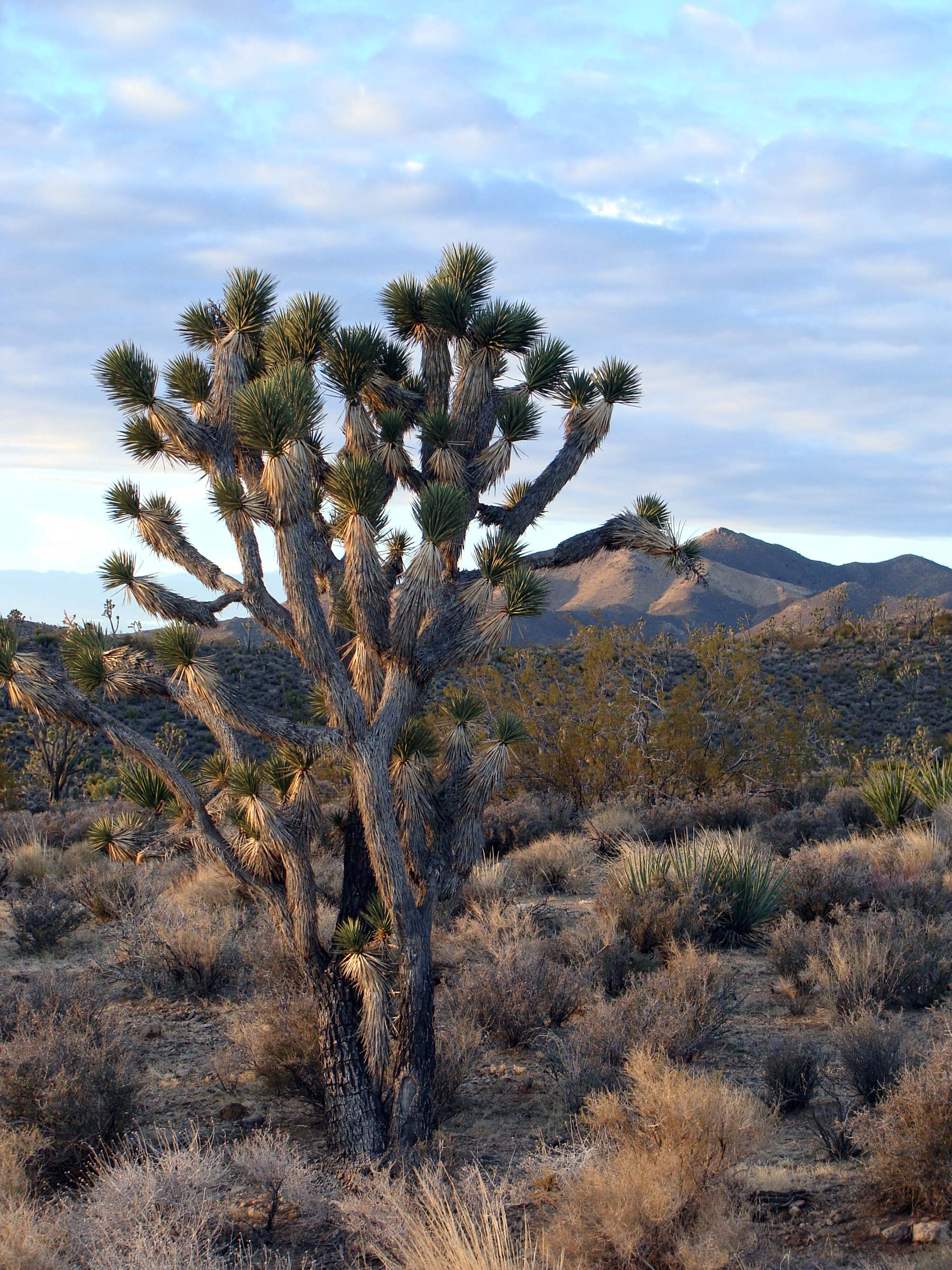

- Location within the United States
- Location: Clark County, Nevada, U.S.
- Nearest town: Searchlight, Nevada
- Coordinates: 35.531256°N 115.096932°W
- Area: 6,489 acres (26 km^{2})
- Established: 2002
- Governing body: U.S. Department of Interior, Bureau of Land Management

Wee Thump Joshua Tree Wilderness is a designated (2002) wilderness area in Nevada. It comprises 6,050 acres (2,450 ha) and has an expanse of old-growth Joshua trees. "Wee Thump" means "ancient ones" in the language of the Paiute people. This Bureau of Land Management wilderness is a few miles west of Searchlight, Nevada. The wilderness is part of the Avi Kwa Ame National Monument, designated in 2023.
