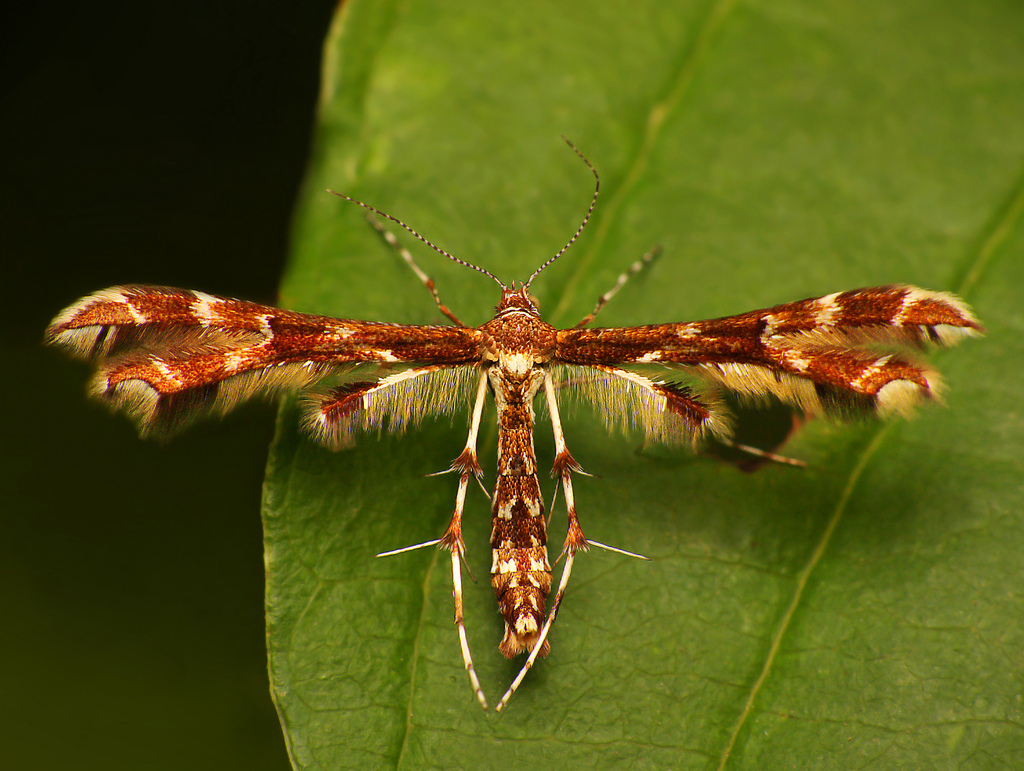

Scientific classification
- Kingdom: Animalia
- Phylum: Arthropoda
- Clade: Pancrustacea
- Class: Insecta
- Order: Lepidoptera
- Family: Pterophoridae
- Genus: Geina
- Species: G. didactyla

Binomial name
- Geina didactyla (Linnaeus, 1758)

Synonyms
- Phalaena didactyla Linnaeus, 1758; Alucita didactyla (Linnaeus, 1758); Pterophorus brunneodactylus Millière, 1854

= Geina didactyla =

Species of plume moth

Geina didactyla is a moth of the Pterophoroidea family. It is found in most of Europe, east into European Russia, and south to Asia Minor (Turkey).

== Description and ecology ==
The wingspan is 17–23 mm. The larvae feed on Geum rivale, Geum urbanum, and Potentilla (including Potentilla rupestris) and Ononis.
