= Spirit Mountain Wilderness =

Federally protected wilderness area in Nevada

- IUCN category Ib (wilderness area)
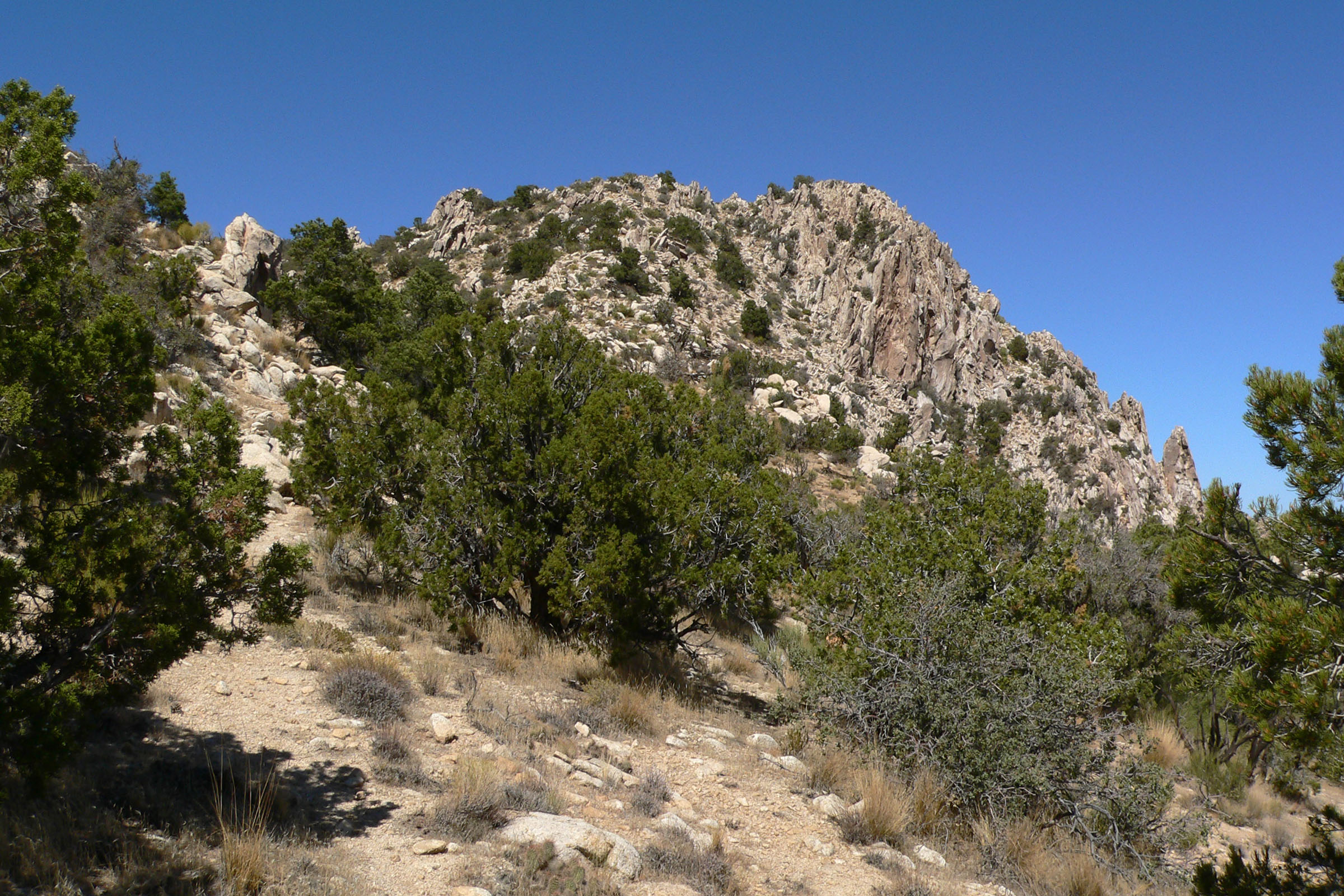
- near the summit of Spirit Mountain

- Location within the United States
- Location: Clark County, Nevada, USA
- Nearest city: Bullhead City, Arizona
- Coordinates: 35°16′12″N 114°39′32″W
- Area: 33,518 acres (13,564 ha)
- Governing body: National Park Service; Bureau of Land Management

Spirit Mountain Wilderness Area is a 33,518-acre (13,564 ha) wilderness area located in the Newberry Mountains in Clark County, Nevada, 10 miles (16 km) northwest of Laughlin. Spirit Mountain lies within the area. It is managed by the Bureau of Land Management and the National Park Service.

Most of the wilderness is located in the Lake Mead National Recreation Area, and all of it is within Avi Kwa Ame National Monument. The area is adjacent to both the Nellis Wash Wilderness Area and the Bridge Canyon Wilderness Area. Ancient Native American petroglyphs abound in Grapevine Canyon, located just south of Spirit Mountain. Located within the Lake Mead National Recreation Area just west of the 67-mile-long Lake Mohave, Grapevine Canyon offers visitors the opportunity to see numerous abstract, anthropomorphic, and animal depictions pecked directly into the basalt rock near the mount of the canyon. A parking area with restrooms is provided and a about a half-mile walk through desert scrub is required to see the petroglyphs. Ranger-guided hikes are offered by National Park Service staff based at Katherine Landing, located on the east side of Lake Mohave 2 miles north of Bullhead City, Arizona, and accessed via Arizona Highway 95 and Highway 68.

The area was in the homeland of the Yuman Indians. Yuman and Mojave people believe all life began on this mountain, which is visible for miles from Bullhead City in Arizona, Needles in California, and Laughlin, Cal-Nev-Ari, and Searchlight in Nevada. Descendants of the first Native Americans to reside in the area still live on the Fort Mojave Indian Reservation, located about 20 miles south of the Spirit Mountains Wilderness.

The United States Congress designated the Spirit Mountain Wilderness in 2002.
