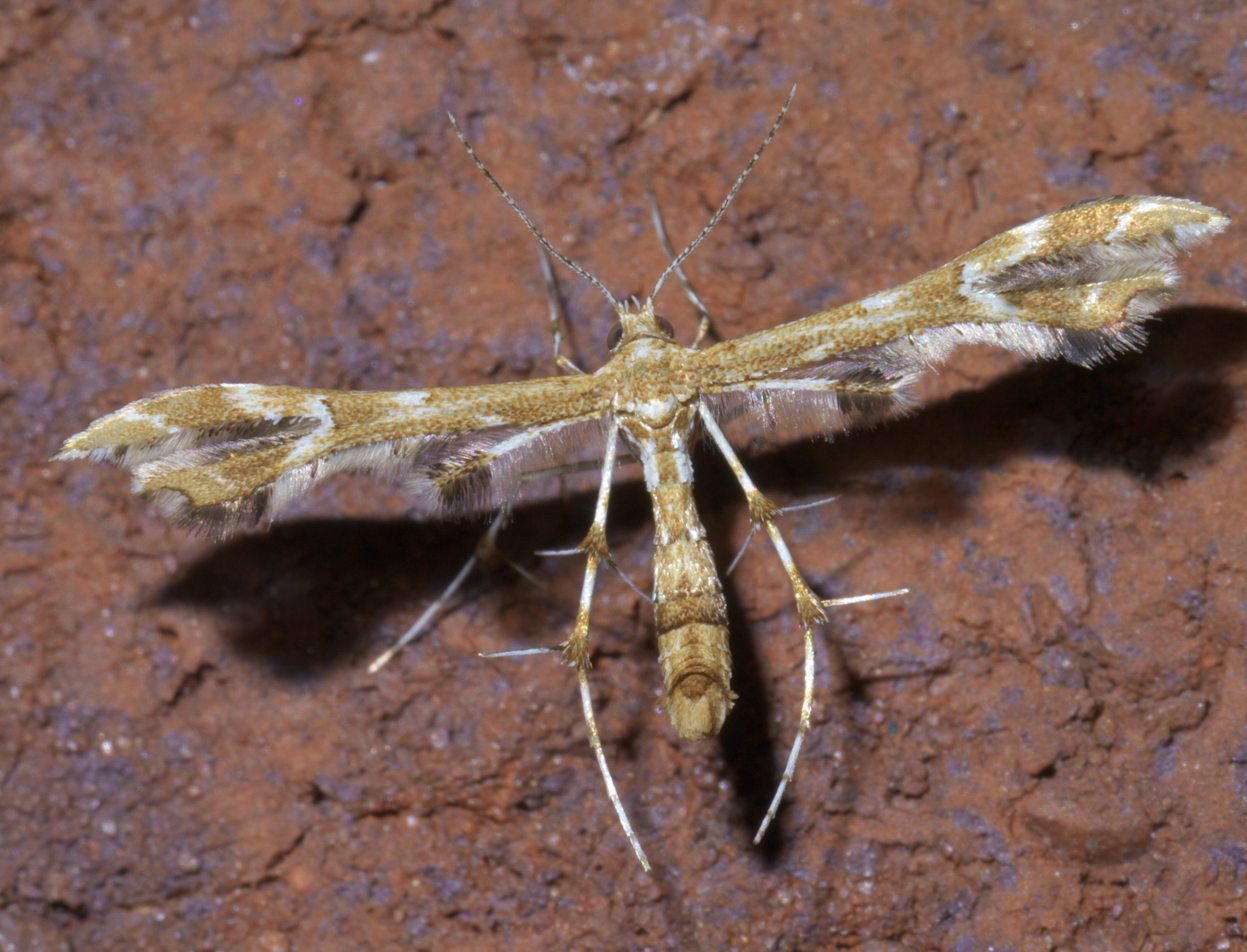

Scientific classification
- Kingdom: Animalia
- Phylum: Arthropoda
- Clade: Pancrustacea
- Class: Insecta
- Order: Lepidoptera
- Family: Pterophoridae
- Subfamily: Pterophorinae
- Tribe: Oxyptilini
- Genus: Geina; Tutt, 1906

= Geina =

Plume moth genus

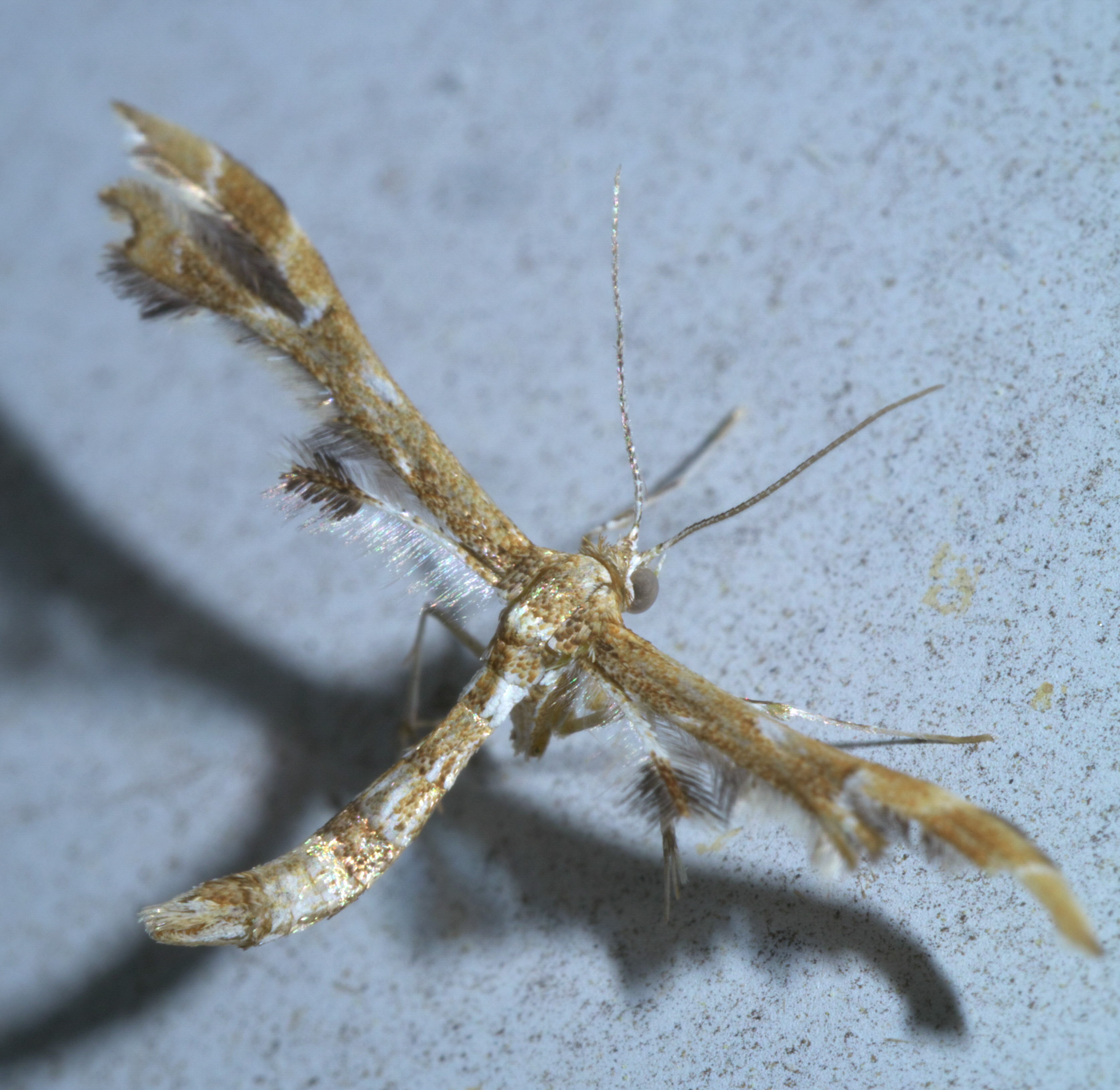
Geina

Geina is a genus of moths in the family Pterophoridae.

== Species ==
There are six species assigned to this genus:

- Geina buscki (McDunnough, 1933)
- Geina didactyla (Linnaeus, 1758)
- Geina integumentum Gielis, 2006
- Geina periscelidactylus (Fitch, 1855)
- Geina sheppardi Landry, 1989
- Geina tenuidactylus (Fitch, 1855)
