= Vine Linux =

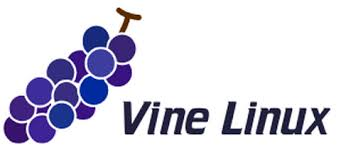
- Vine Linux logo

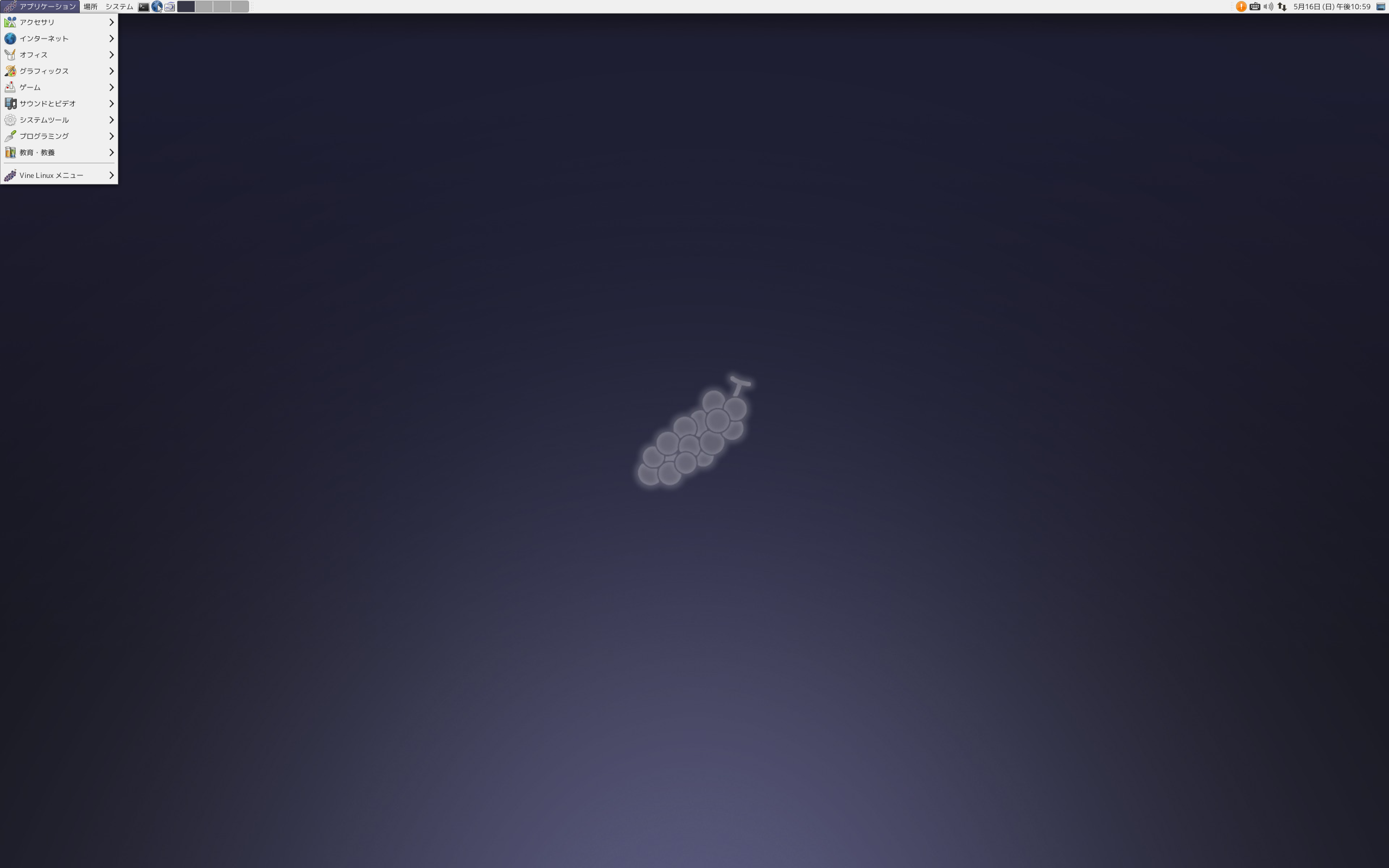
- Vine Linux 6.1 desktop with GNOME 2.32
- Developer: VineCaves / Project Vine
- OS family: Linux (Unix-like)
- Working state: Discontinued
- Source model: Open source
- Latest release: 6.5 / April 3, 2017; 9 years ago
- Available in: Japanese, English
- Update method: Rolling release
- Package manager: apt-rpm
- Supported platforms: amd64, i386
- Kernel type: Monolithic kernel
- Default user interface: GNOME
- License: Various
- Official website: www.vinelinux.org

Vine Linux (ヴァイン・リナックス, Vain Rinakkusu) was a Japanese Linux distribution sponsored by VineCaves. It has been a fork of Red Hat Linux 7.2 since Vine Linux 3.0. Work on Vine Linux was started in 1998.

All versions except Vine Seed have been announced to be discontinued from May 4, 2021.

== Release history ==
Colour	Meaning
Red	Release no longer supported
Green	Release still supported
Blue	Future release

Vine Linux release history
Version	Code name	Release date	Supported until
1.0	Nahe	1999-03-28	2000-01-11?
1.1	Rheingau	1999-06-04	2000-01-11?
2.0	Sociando-Mallet	2000-04-14	2003-04-07?
2.1	Cissac	2000-11-04	2003-04-07?
2.1.5	Calon-Segur	2001-03-24	2003-04-07?
2.5	Domaine de Chevalier	2002-04-15	2006-02-28?
2.6	La Fleur de Bouard	2002-10-25	2006-02-28
3.0	Valandraud	2004-08-02	2007-11-22?
3.1	Pichon Lalande	2004-11-26	2007-11-22?
3.2	Ducru Baucaillou	2005-09-18	2007-11-22
4.0	Latour	2006-11-22	2010-08-24?
4.1	Cos d'Estournel	2007-02-22	2010-08-24?
4.2	Lynch Bages	2007-12-25	2010-08-24
5.0	Lafite	2009-8-24	2012-08-06
5.1	Cheval Blanc	2010-02-26	2012-08-06
5.2	Palmer	2010-11-30	2012-08-06
6.0	Haut Brion	2011-08-06	Undecided
6.1	Pape Clement	2012-7-30	Undecided
6.2	Haut Bailly	2013-10-15	Undecided
6.3	Malartic	2015-02-26	Undecided
6.5	Poupille	2017-04-03	Undecided
	Vine Seed	2017-10-08	Undecided
