= Vinelink.com =

American prisoner tracking website

Vinelink.com (VINE)
- Website type: Victim notification service; Government services
- Available in: English
- Area served: Most U.S. states and territories
- Website: vinelink.com
- Registration: Required for notifications
- Current status: Online

Vinelink.com (VINE) is a national website in the United States that allows victims of crime, and the general public, to track the movements of prisoners held by the various states and territories. The first four letters in the websites name, "vine", are an acronym for "Victim Information and Notification Everyday". Vinelink.com displays information, based on the information provided by the various states' departments of correction and other law enforcement agencies, on whether an inmate is in custody, has been released, has been granted parole or probation, or has escaped from custody. In some cases, the website will reveal whether a defendant has been granted parole or probation, but then subsequently violated conditions of their release and become a fugitive. Information provided on Vinelink.com represents metadata, in that the website lists a defendant's custody status; but does not list what the individual is charged with, their criminal history, or the amount of their bail, if applicable.

Internet users accessing the Vinelink.com website choose from a map of states and provinces within the United States where they wish to perform a search for an inmate. The user may then search for an individual using the inmate's or parolee's name, or by entering the inmate's specific department of corrections inmate number, if known. When the inmate's custody status changes, users who have registered to be notified of such changes will be notified via email, phone or both. This information is currently released upon request, without the website requesting reasons for the users search or requiring payment, as public records available to the general public.

Inmate information is available for most states, and for Puerto Rico, on the website. The states of Arizona, Georgia, Massachusetts, Montana, New Hampshire and West Virginia provide very limited information on the site. In March 2025, The Maine Sheriff's Association entered into a contract to pilot the use of the VINE system in three counties in the state as well as a regional jail, therefore making South Dakota the only state that does not participate in the VINE system to any degree. The website does not provide data on prisoners detained by the Federal Bureau of Prisons which has its own inmate locator web site nor for inmates of the U.S. military prisons.

== See also ==
- Visit the official Federal Bureau of Prisons website to search for inmates being held by the United States Federal Bureau of Prisons.
