= Vine Toolkit =

- Developers: Poznan Supercomputing and Networking Center
- Stable release: 2.0 / March 31, 2015
- Written in: Java
- Operating system: Cross-platform
- Type: software framework
- License: Apache License Version 2.0
- Website: http://vinetoolkit.psnc.pl

Vine Toolkit is an open source software framework that is used to create Grid-aware web applications.

== Usage ==
According to the Vine Toolkit web site:

"Vine is a modular, extensible Java library that offers developers an easy-to-use, high-level Application Programmer Interface (API) for Grid-enabling applications. Vine can be deployed for use in desktop, Java Web Start, Java Servlet and Java Portlet environments with ease."

According to the Vine Toolkit project page, Vine case be used to:

- Create web application based on Flex technologies.
- Add Grid context to the web components with the relevant plugins.
- Abstract different middlewares implementation details. That allows user to create his application once and execute it on every supported middleware.

In its basic form ( without any additional plugins ) it could be perceived as a MVC framework.

== Architecture ==
One of the key concepts in Vine is its plug-in based structure:

"The Vine Toolkit consists of a core project that defines a base API and programming model upon which sub projects are built. Each sub project addresses a particular problem area. Some, like the Grid Vine, build upon core Vine to define more general concepts and extensible elements. Others, like the Globus Toolkit 4 Vine, are concerned with adding support for particular third party libraries and services. Each project conforms to a particular file structure that defines how source code is built as well as how third party libraries and configuration files are packaged and deployed."

== Platforms ==
Since Vine is Java and Flex based framework it works with all major platforms including Windows, Unix and Mac Os. On top of that Vine offers several deployment scenarios:

- Integration with the Gridsphere portlet container.
- Integration with the Liferay portal.
- Web service instance.
- Standalone (console) application.

== Release history ==
- Vine Toolkit 1.0 – May 2008
- Vine Toolkit 1.1 – October 2009
- Vine Toolkit 1.2 – April 2010
- Vine Toolkit 1.3 - April 2011
- Vine Toolkit 2.0 - March 2015
