= Grapevine Hills =

- Location within California Location within the United States

Highest point
- Elevation: 1,001 m (3,284 ft)

Geography
- Country: United States
- State: California
- Region: Colorado Desert
- District(s): Anza-Borrego Desert State Park, San Diego County
- Range coordinates: 33°10′4.148″N 116°28′49.058″W
- Topo map: USGS Tubb Canyon

The Grapevine Hills are a low mountain range within Anza-Borrego Desert State Park in the Colorado Desert, in eastern San Diego County, southern California.
