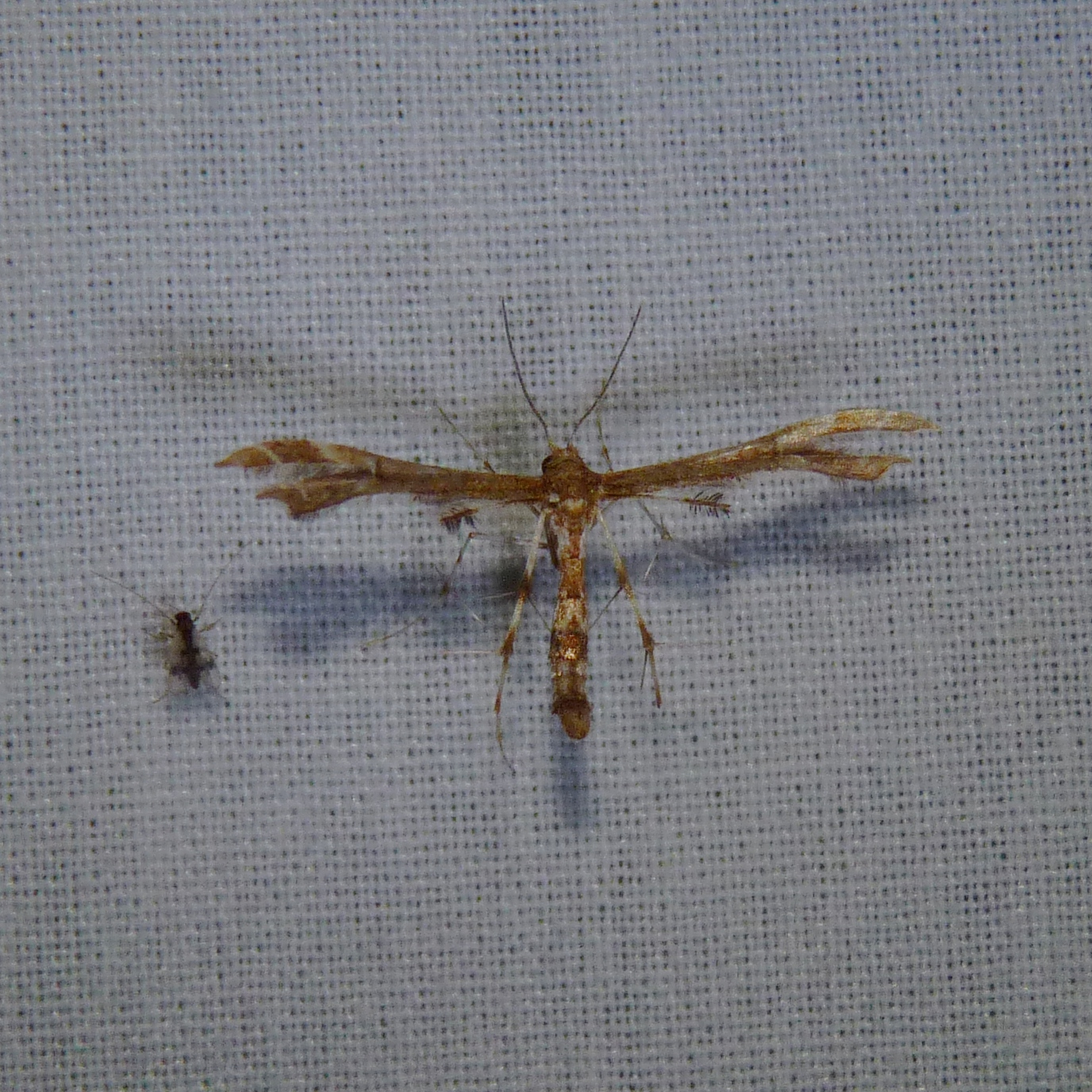

Scientific classification
- Kingdom: Animalia
- Phylum: Arthropoda
- Class: Insecta
- Order: Lepidoptera
- Family: Pterophoridae
- Genus: Geina
- Species: G. periscelidactylus

Binomial name
- Geina periscelidactylus (Fitch, 1855)

Synonyms
- Pterophorus periscelidactyla Fitch, 1855

= Geina periscelidactylus =

Species of plume moth

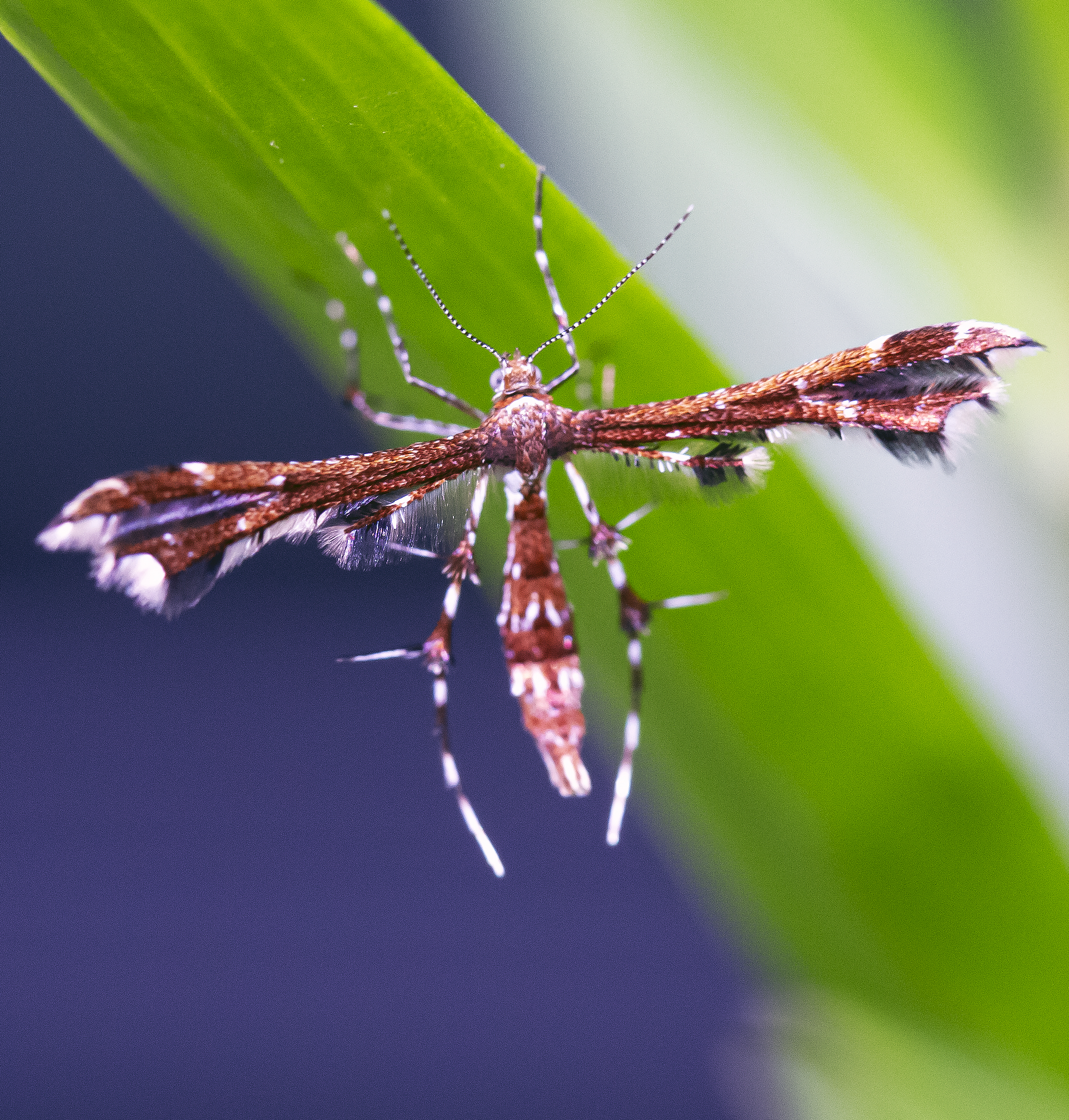
Geina periscelidactylus

Geina periscelidactylus (grape plume moth) is a moth of the Pterophoroidea family. It is found in eastern North America.

The wingspan is about 16 mm (0.63 in). Adults are on wing from June to July.

The larvae feed on grape and Virginia creeper. It is considered a minor pest on cultivated grape. The larvae web together the young leaves and shoots.
