= Grapevine Creek (Texas) =

Creek in northern Texas

Location
- Country: United States

Physical characteristics
- Source
  - location: Big Bear Creek
- Mouth
  - location: Elm Fork of the Trinity River
  - coordinates: 32°56′48″N 96°56′35″W
- Length: 8 mi (13 km)

Grapevine Creek is a creek in Tarrant County, Texas. The creek rises west of the Dallas Fort Worth International Airport in Grapevine and flows for eight miles. The creek meets the Elm Fork of the Trinity River west of Farmers Branch.
