= Vine Inn, Pamphill =

Pub in Dorset, England

Vine Inn
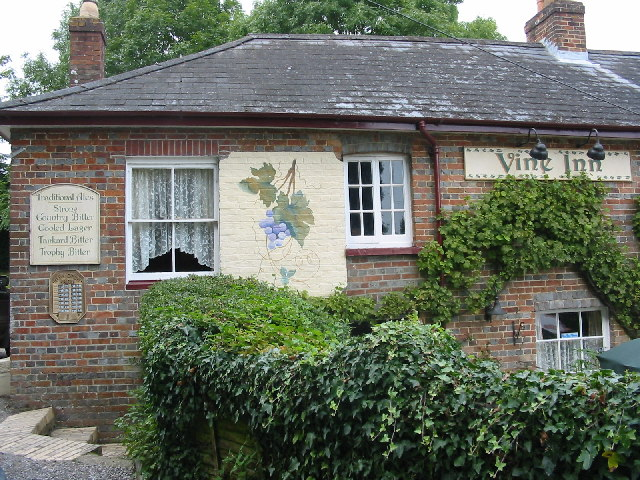
- The pub in 2005

General information
- Type: Public house; originally a bakery
- Location: Vine Hill, Pamphill, Dorset, England
- Coordinates: 50.802708°N 2.009598°W
- Opening: c. 1900; 126 years ago (as a pub)
- Owner: National Trust

The Vine Inn is a public house on Vine Hill in Pamphill, a village in Dorset, England. Originally a bakery, it was converted into a pub around 1900 and has been operated by the same family since 1910. Owned by the National Trust since 1989, it is noted for its remarkably unaltered early 20th-century interior and is included on the Campaign for Real Ale (CAMRA)'s National Inventory of Historic Pub Interiors, where it is rated three stars and regarded as being of "outstanding national historic importance".

== History ==
Originally a bakery and associated stores, the building was converted into a public house around 1900 by the grandfather of the landlady who became its first licensee. The pub has remained in the same family's operation since 1910. Formerly owned by Marston's of Poole and later by Strong's of Romsey, it was acquired by the National Trust in 1989 and remains in its ownership.

The pub was included on the Campaign for Real Ale (CAMRA)'s National Inventory of Historic Pub Interiors before the inventory's grading system was revised. Under the revised scheme, it is rated three stars and its interior is regarded as being "of outstanding national historic importance".

== Architecture ==
=== Exterior ===
The building consists of an early 19th-century range of red and black brick construction facing the road, with a slightly later extension to the rear. Built on a sloping site, its unusual arrangement places the principal public bar below road level. The exterior retains traditional features including separate external toilets. The pub takes its name from a vine that grows across the building's exterior.

=== Interior ===
The interior is arranged around a small public bar, measuring approximately 8 by 8 feet (2.4 m × 2.4 m), and regarded as one of the smallest surviving public bars in England. Despite minor alterations, it retains much of its early 20th-century character, including the original panelled bar counter, surviving bar-back shelving, fixed bench seating, and historic fixtures associated with the servery. Adjoining rooms include a simple tap room, reached by steps from both the road and the public bar, which retains tongue-and-groove dado panelling, full-height timber panelling and a fireplace. A further small room, formerly part of the licensee's accommodation and brought into pub use in the 1960s, contains a distinctive ribbed-panel bar counter and remnants of its earlier domestic use. The pub also retains a number of historic features, including a glazed-brick urinal.
