= Vines (surname) =

Vines is a surname. It may refer to:

- David Vines (born 1949), Australian economist
- Duncan Vines (1869-1950), English cricketer and Royal Indian Navy officer
- Ellsworth Vines (1911–1994), American tennis player
- Harry Vines (1938–2006), American basketball coach
- Jerry Vines (born 1937), American preacher and pastor
- John Vines (born 1949), American lieutenant-general
- Josephus C. Vines (1873-1964), American politician
- Sherard Vines (1890–1974), English writer
- Sydney Howard Vines (1849–1934), British botanist
- Graham Vines (born 1930), British cyclist

== See also ==
- Vine (surname), Vine
