= Vine (surname) =

Vine is a surname, and may refer to:

- Barbara Vine, pseudonym of British writer Ruth Rendell
- Carl Vine, Australian composer
- Cortnee Vine, Australian footballer
- David Vine, British television presenter
- Fred Vine, English geophysicist studied continental drift
- Harriette Vine, New Zealand lawyer
- Ian Vine, British composer
- Jasmine Vine, video game programmer
- Jay Vine, Australian professional racing cyclist
- Jeremy Vine, English journalist and radio presenter
- Joseph Vine, professional cricketer
- Rowan Vine, English footballer
- Stella Vine, English artist
- Tim Vine, English comedian
- William Edwy Vine, English Biblical scholar, dictionary editor

== See also ==
- Vine
- Vines (surname)
