= Vine Street (disambiguation) =

Vine Street is a road in Hollywood, Los Angeles.

Vine Street may also refer to:

- Vine Street (Philadelphia)
- Vine Street, Cincinnati
- Vine Street, Kansas City
- Vine Street, London
- Vine Street (Murray, Utah)
- Vine Street (TV series), an early American soap opera television series which was broadcast in Los Angeles in 1938 and named after the road in Los Angeles
- Interstate 676, also known as the Vine Street Expressway in Philadelphia
- Ohio State Route 640, also known as Vine Street
