= Newberry Mountains (Nevada) =

Mountain range in Nevada, United States

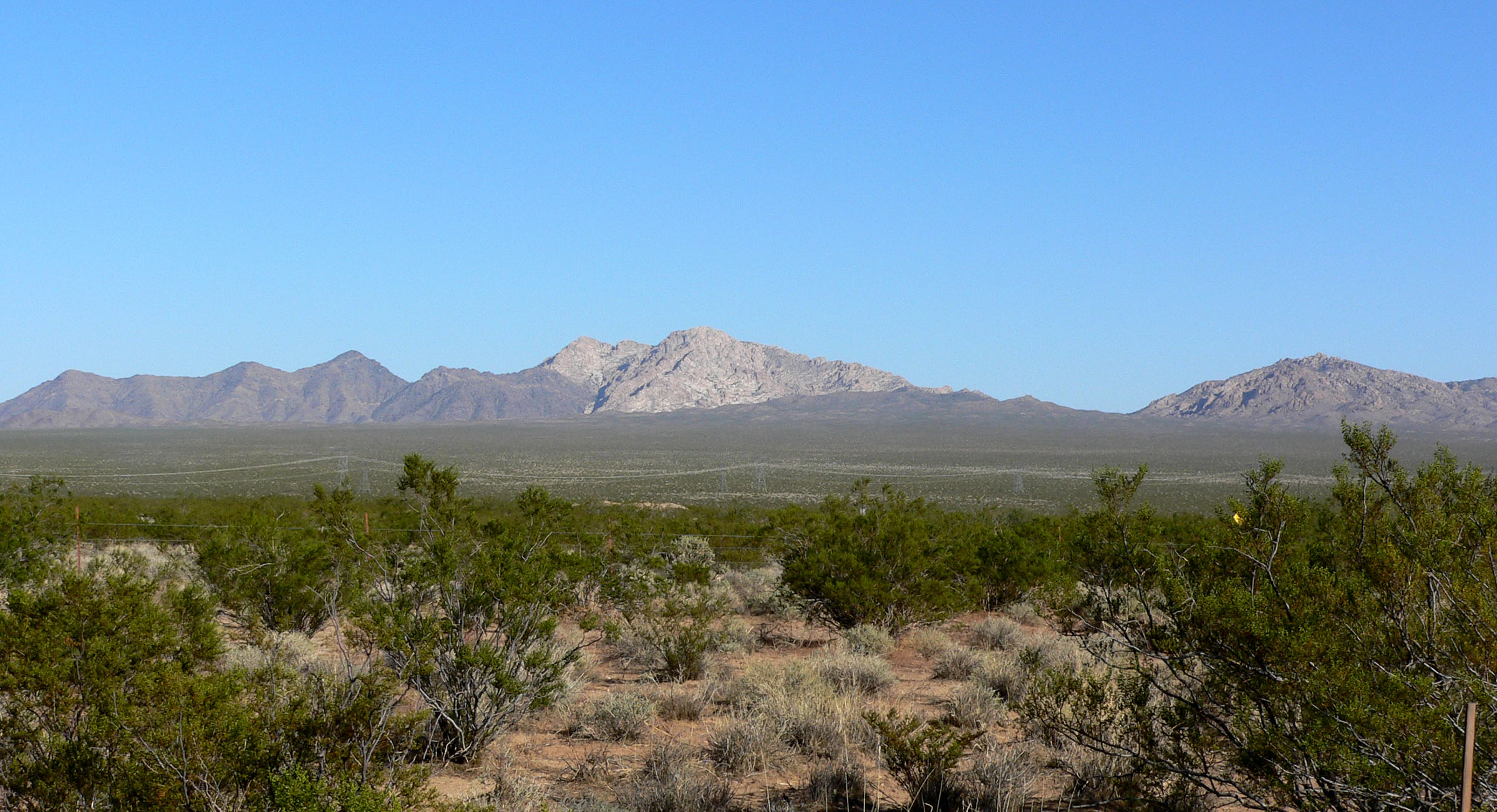
- View from the west, with Spirit Mountain prominent in the center

Highest point
- Peak: Spirit Mountain
- Elevation: 5,642 ft (1,720 m) NAVD 88
- Prominence: 2,879 ft (878 m)
- Coordinates: 35°16′30″N 114°43′24″W

Geography
- Location within Nevada
- Country: United States
- State: Nevada
- Regions: Mojave Desert; Cal-Nev-Ari
- Geological feature: Mohave Valley
- Range coordinates: 35°14′15″N 114°36′53″W

The Newberry Mountains in Nevada are located east of Cal-Nev-Ari and the United States Coast Guard LORAN station in the southern part of the state. The range is Nevada's southernmost named mountain range, and lies to the northwest of the town of Laughlin and west of Lake Mohave. The Newberry Mountains connect with the Eldorado Mountains and The Highland Mountains. The highest point in the range is Spirit Mountain at 5,642 feet (1,720 m).

Native Americans held the range to be sacred. The range includes Spirit Mountain which is a Native American Traditional Cultural Property and is listed on the National Register of Historic Places.

Ancient Native American petroglyphs abound in Grapevine Canyon, located just south of Spirit Mountain in the Newberry Mountain range. Located within the Lake Mead National Recreation Area just west of the 67-mile-long Lake Mohave, Grapevine Canyon offers visitors the opportunity to see numerous abstract, anthropomorphic, and animal depictions pecked directly into the basalt rock near the mount of the canyon. A parking area with restrooms is provided and a about a half-mile walk through desert scrub is required to see the petroglyphs. Ranger-guided hikes are offered by National Park Service staff based at Katherine Landing, located on the east side of Lake Mohave 2 miles north of Bullhead City, Arizona, and accessed via Arizona Highway 95 and Highway 68.

The area is in the homeland of the Yuman people. Yuman and Mojave people believe all life began on this mountain, which is visible for miles from Bullhead City in Arizona, Needles in California, and Laughlin, Cal-Nev-Ari, and Searchlight in Nevada. Descendants of the first Native Americans to reside in the area still live on the Fort Mojave Indian Reservation, located about 20 miles south of the Spirit Mountains Wilderness.
