= Lake Mead National Recreation Area =

U.S. protected area in Nevada and Arizona

- IUCN category V (protected landscape/seascape)
- Interactive map of Lake Mead National Recreation Area
- Location: Clark County, Nevada and Mohave County, Arizona, United States
- Nearest city: Boulder City and Las Vegas, Nevada
- Coordinates: 36°00′35″N 114°47′48″W
- Area: 1,495,806 acres (6,053.31 km^{2})
- Established: October 13, 1936; 89 years ago
- Visitors: 6,412,854 (in 2024)
- Governing body: Department of the Interior (DOI); National Park Service (NPS)
- Website: Lake Mead National Recreation Area

Lake Mead National Recreation Area is a U.S. national recreation area in Southeastern Nevada and Northwestern Arizona. Operated by the National Park Service, Lake Mead NRA follows the Colorado River corridor from the westernmost boundary of Grand Canyon National Park to just north of the cities of Laughlin, Nevada and Bullhead City, Arizona. It includes all of the eponymous Lake Mead as well as the smaller Lake Mohave – reservoirs on the river created by Hoover Dam and Davis Dam, respectively – and the surrounding desert terrain and wilderness.

Formation of Lake Mead began in 1935, less than a year before Hoover Dam was completed. The area surrounding Lake Mead was protected as a bird refuge in 1933 and later established as the Boulder Dam Recreation Area in 1936 and the name was changed to Lake Mead National Recreation Area in 1947. In 1964, the area was expanded to include Lake Mohave and its surrounding area and became the first National Recreation Area to be designated as such by the U.S. Congress.

== Amenities ==
Lake Mead NRA features water recreation, including boating, swimming, and fishing, on both lakes as well as the stretches of river between the lakes. It also features hiking trails and views of the surrounding desert landscape. Three of the four desert ecosystems found in the United States — the Mojave Desert, the Great Basin Desert, and the Sonoran Desert — meet in Lake Mead NRA. Tours of Hoover Dam – administered by the U.S. Bureau of Reclamation – are also a major attraction within the recreation area.

About 200,000 acres (81,000 ha) of the recreation area are managed separately under the Grand Canyon-Parashant National Monument, established in 2000. Water covers about 186,000 acres (75,000 ha) of the recreation area.

== Recreation ==
Lake Mead NRA offers diverse recreational activities, drawing visitors from across the country. The area spans over 1.5 million acres of desert landscapes, two reservoirs (Lake Mead and Lake Mohave), and unique geological features.

The recreation area provides premier destinations for boating, fishing, kayaking, and swimming, supported by over 750 miles of shoreline. Boating facilities, including marinas, boat ramps, and houseboat rentals, enhance the visitor experience. Fishing opportunities abound, with species like striped bass, catfish, and crappie commonly caught in the lakes.

With over 200 miles (320 km) of trails, Lake Mead NRA caters to hikers of all skill levels. Trails range from scenic lakeside walks to challenging treks, such as the Historic Railroad Trail and Goldstrike Canyon Trail, home to the natural Gold Strike Hot Springs. Campgrounds and backcountry camping sites provide options for overnight stays.

The desert terrain, extreme temperatures, and water-related hazards contribute to its reputation as one of the most dangerous national parks in the United States. From 2007 to 2024, 317 fatalities were reported in the area, with water-related incidents like drowning being the leading cause.

=== Conservation and Visitor Safety ===
The National Park Service (NPS) is dedicated to maintaining safety and preserving the natural and cultural heritage of Lake Mead NRA. Safety programs emphasize the use of life jackets, hydration, and heat preparedness. Visitor centers and interpretive programs provide resources and educational materials to enhance the visitor experience while promoting responsible recreation.

=== Historical Features ===
The ghost town of St. Thomas, Nevada, located within Lake Mead NRA, offers a unique glimpse into the region's history. Once submerged under Lake Mead, the town has reemerged as water levels have receded, revealing a 2-mile loop trail with interpretive signage. It is accessed near the Northshore Entrance Station, just south of Overton.

== Wilderness areas ==
There are currently nine officially designated wilderness areas under the National Wilderness Preservation System lying within Lake Mead National Recreation Area. All are in the Nevada portion. Parts of some of these wildernesses (as indicated) lie outside Lake Mead NRA and are managed by the Bureau of Land Management:

- Black Canyon Wilderness (Nevada)
- Bridge Canyon Wilderness
- Eldorado Wilderness (partly BLM)
- Ireteba Peaks Wilderness (partly BLM)
- Jimbilnan Wilderness
- Muddy Mountains Wilderness (mostly BLM)
- Nellis Wash Wilderness
- Pinto Valley Wilderness
- Spirit Mountain Wilderness (partly BLM)

== Park resources ==
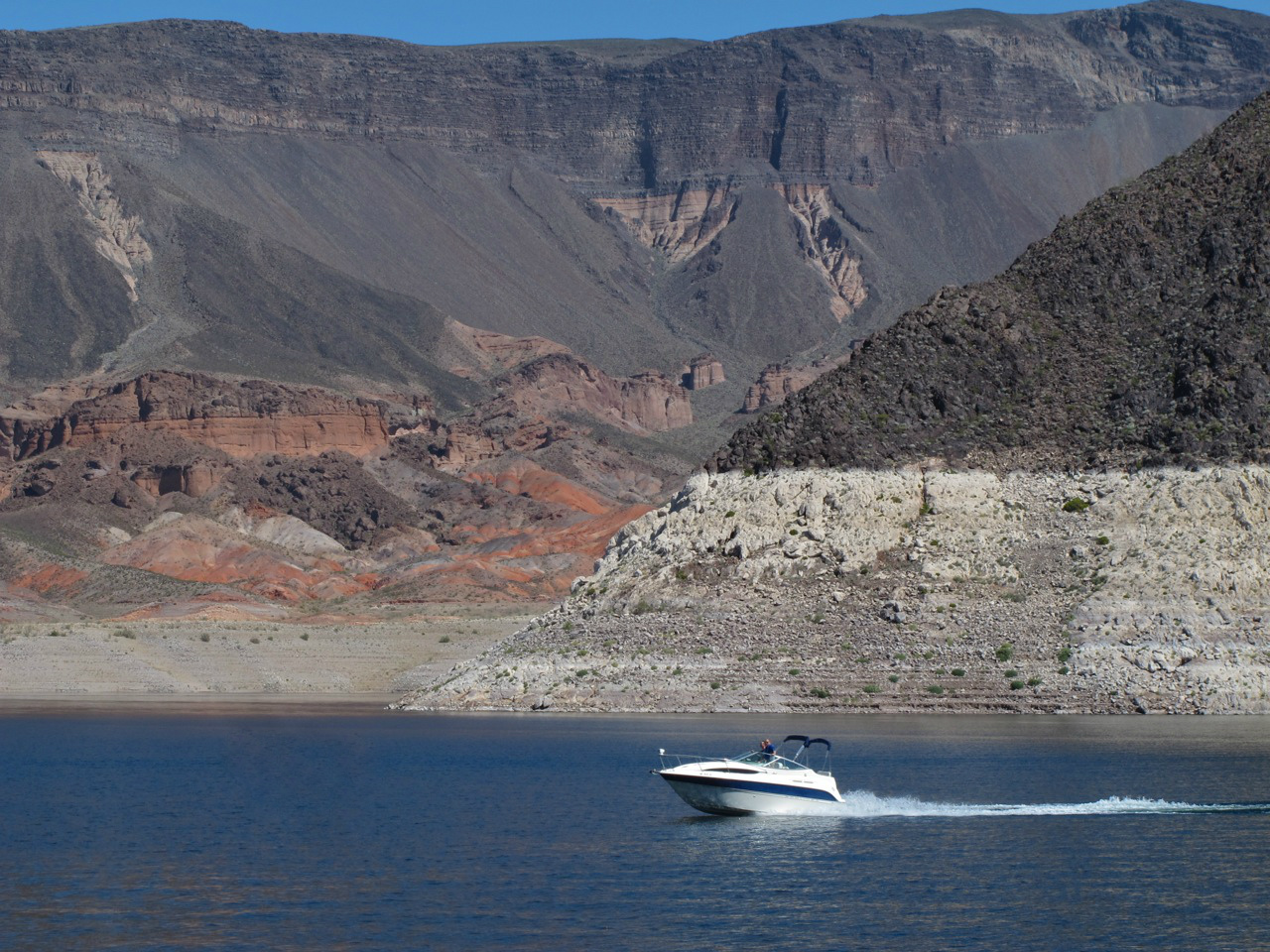
A boat at Lake Mead National Recreation Area

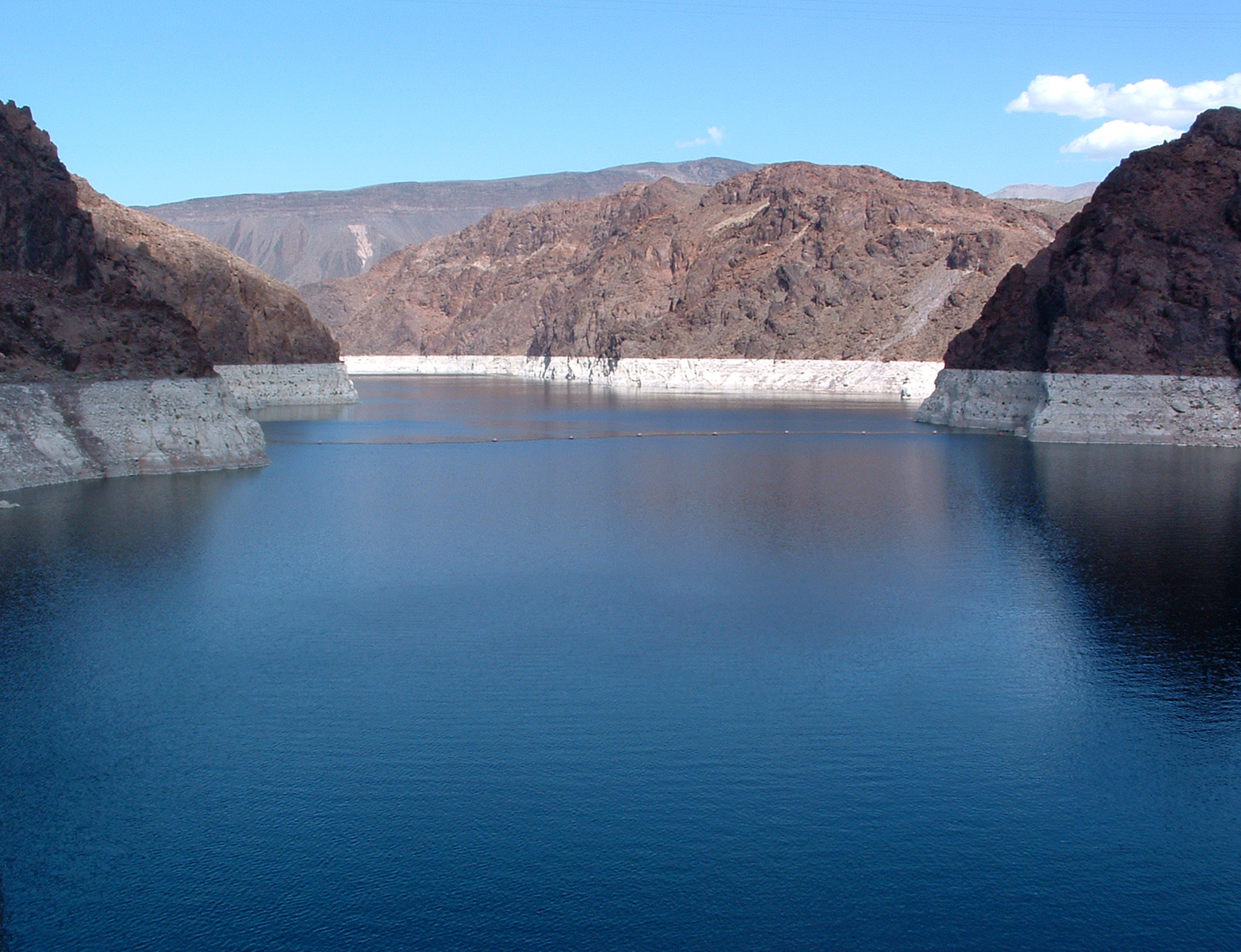
Lake Mead from the Hoover Dam

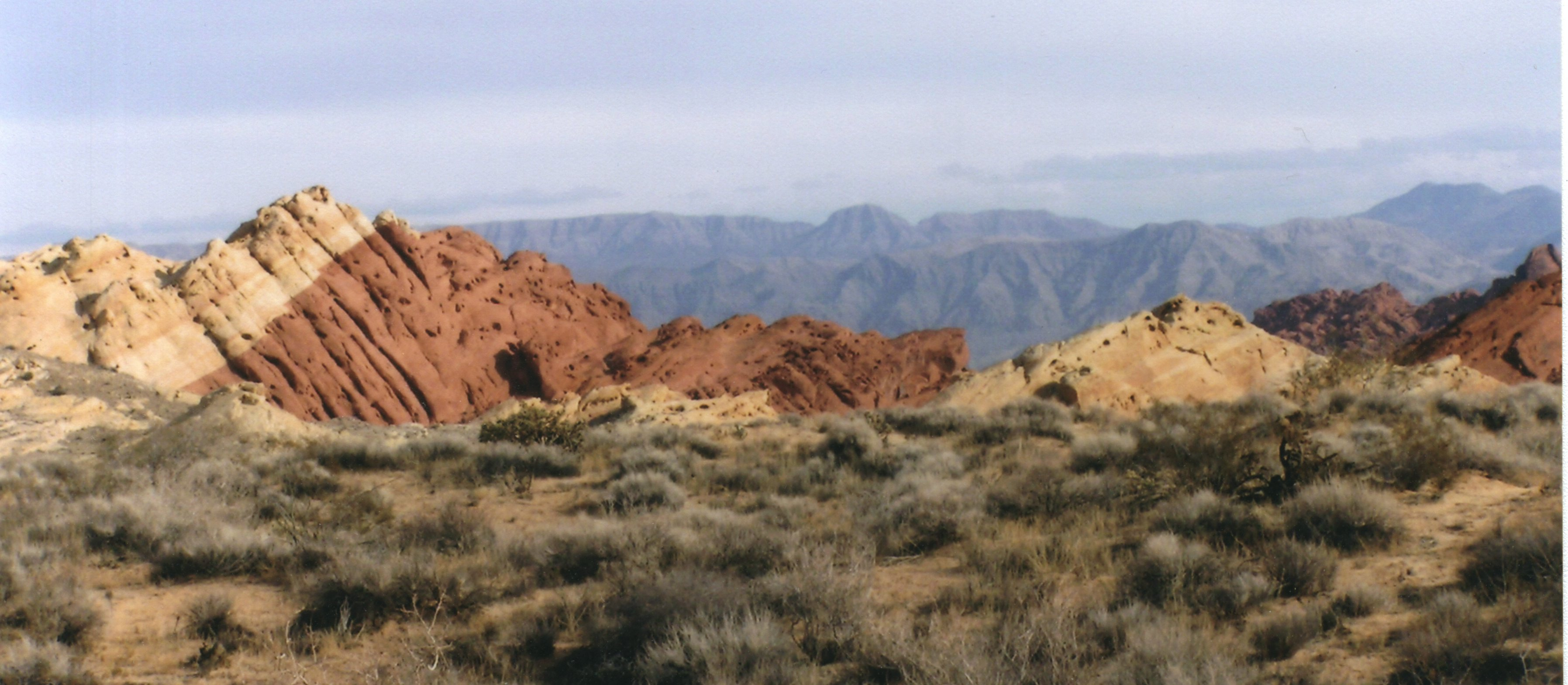
Rock formations near Echo Bay

- 900 plant species
- 500 animal species
- 24 rare and threatened species
  - The relict leopard frog (Lithobates onca) is now believed to survive only in this area.
- 9 designated wilderness areas
- 122,166 museum objects and archives
- 1,347 recorded archeological sites
- 23 historic structures
- 8 listed National Register Properties
- 2 Traditional Cultural Properties

=== Fish species ===
Lakes Mead and Mohave offer some of the country’s best sport fishing. The following species are found in both lakes:

- Largemouth Bass
- Striped Bass
- Crappie
- Rainbow Trout
- Catfish (Channel)
- Bluegill

== Visitation ==
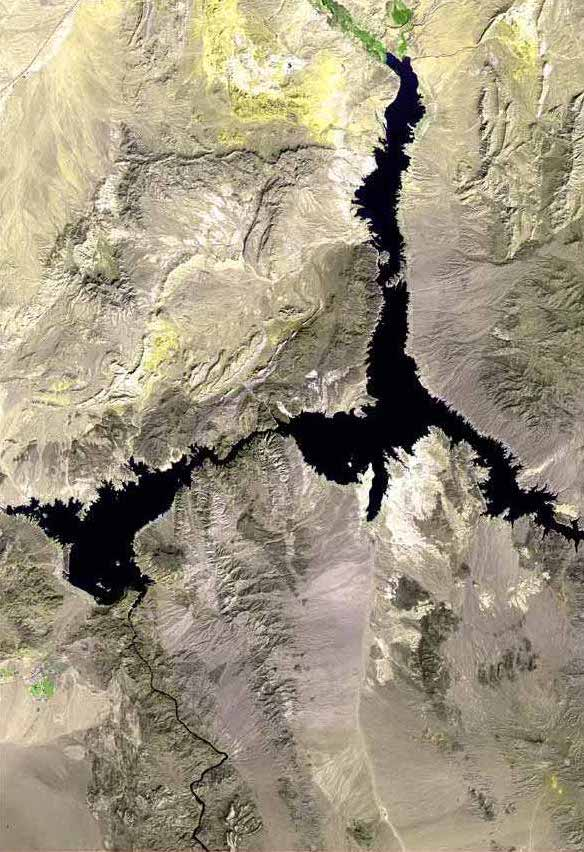
Satellite image of Lake Mead

For 2012, with 6.3 million recreational visits, Lake Mead National Recreation Area was the 5th most visited national park.

Calendar Year	Annual Visits Total	Cumulative Visits		
1936				
1937	552,128	552,128		
1938	533,914	1,086,042	-18,214	-3.30%
1939	649,624	1,735,666	+115,710	+21.67%
1940	668,027	2,403,693	+18,403	+2.83%
1941	844,733	3,248,426	+176,706	+26.45%
1942	338,778	3,587,204	-505,955	-59.90%
1943	214,190	3,801,394	-124,588	-36.78%
1944	263,533	4,064,927	+49,343	+23.04%
1945	587,436	4,652,363	+323,903	+122.91%
1946	1,165,369	5,817,732	+577,933	+98.38%
1947	1,426,831	7,244,563	+261,462	+22.44%
1948	1,654,004	8,898,567	+227,173	+15.92%
1949	1,423,552	10,322,119	-230,452	-13.93%
1950	1,798,280	12,120,399	+374,728	+26.32%
1951	2,053,619	14,174,018	+255,339	+14.20%
1952	1,946,706	16,120,724	-106,913	-5.21%
1953	2,220,940	18,341,664	+274,234	+14.09%
1954	2,112,724	20,454,388	-108,216	-4.87%
1955	2,675,371	23,129,759	+562,647	+26.60%
1956	2,672,774	25,802,533	-2,597	-0.10%
1957	2,955,257	28,757,790	+282,483	+10.57%
1958	3,190,580	31,948,370	+235,323	+7.96%
1959	3,390,574	35,338,944	+199,994	+6.27%
1960	2,254,185	37,593,129	-1,136,389	-33.50%
1961	2,219,960	39,813,089	-34,225	-1.50%
1962	2,688,745	42,501,834	+468,785	+21.10%
1963	3,349,565	45,851,399	+660,820	+24.60%
1964	3,462,580	49,313,979	+113,015	+3.40%
1965	3,594,065	52,908,044	+131,485	+3.80%
1966	3,720,485	56,628,529	+126,420	+3.50%
1967	4,102,335	60,730,864	+381.85	+10.30%
1968	4,751,795	65,482,659	+649,460	+15.80%
1969	5,614,940	71,097,599	+863,145	+18.20%
1970	4,897,135	75,994,734	-717,805	-12.80%
1971	4,570,229	80,564,963	-326,906	-6.70%
1972	4,888,640	85,453,599	+318,407	+6.90%
1973	5,534,315	90,987,914	+645,679	+13.20%
1974	5,939,533	96,927,447	+405,218	+7.32%
1975	6,219,220	103,146,667	+279,687	+4.70%
1976	6,948,611	110,095,278	+729,391	+11.72%
1977	6,529,848	116,625,126	-418,763	-6.00%
1978	6,879,870	123,504,996	+350.022	+5.30%
1979	6,378,341	129,883,337	-501,529	-7.30%
1980	5,145,699	135,029,036	-1,232,642	-19.30%
1981	5,406,184	140,435,220	+260,485	+0.05%
1982	5,565,467	146,000,687	+159,283	+3.00%
1983	6,128,254	152,128,941	+562,787	+10.10%
1984	6,504,206	158,633,147	+375,952	+6.10%
1985	7,204,295	165,837,442	+700,089	+10.70%
1986	8,034,542	173,871,984	+830,247	+11.50%
1987	8,392,419	182,264,403	+357,877	+4.50%
1988	8,629,895	190,894,298	+237,476	+2.83%
1989	8,803,414	199,697,712	+173,519	+2.00%
1990	8,893,495	208,591,207	+90.081	+1.02%
1991	8,751,312	217,342,519	-142,183	-1.59%
1992	9,343,549	226,686,068	+592,237	+6.80%
1993	9,265,520	235,951,588	-78,029	-0.84%
1994	9,913,705	245,865,293	+648,185	+7.00%
1995	10,195,546	256,060,839	+281,841	+2.85%
1996	9,689,997	265,750,836	-505,549	-4.96%
1997	8,837,742	274,588,578	-852,255	-8.80%
1998	9,106,793	283,695,371	+269,051	+3.00%
1999	9,351,237	293,046,608	+244,444	+2.68%
2000	9,072,545	302,119,153	-278,692	-3.00%
2001	8,772,589	310,891,742	-299,956	-3.31%
2002	7,824,128	318,715,870	-948,461	-10.81%
2003	8,202,677	326,918,545	+378,547	+4.84%
2004	8,103,609	335,022,154	-99,066	-1.21%
2005	7,971,437	342,993,591	-132,172	-1.63%
2006	8,059,850	351,053,441	+88,413	+1.11%
2007	7,898,592	358,952,033	-161,258	-2.00%
2008	7,877,581	366,829,614	-21,011	-0.27%
2009	7,946,830	374,776,444	+69,249	+0.88%
2010				
2011				
2012				
2013				
2014				
2015				
2016				
2017				
2018				
2019				

== See also ==
- List of areas in the United States National Park System
