= Bitter Spring Valley =

Valley in Clark County, Nevada

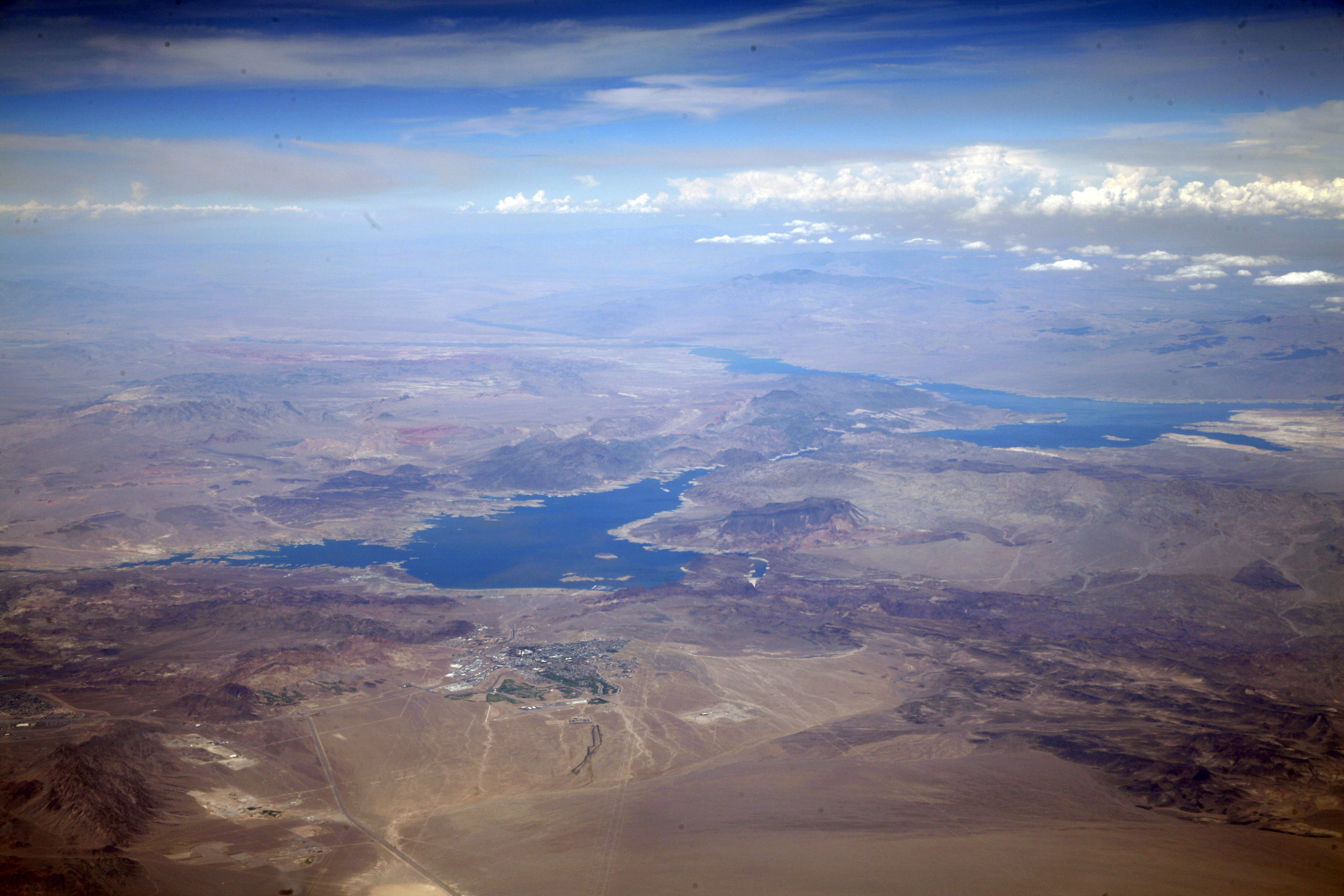

- Location within Nevada
- Length: 13 mi (21 km) ENE
- Width: 7 mi (11 km)

Geography
- Country: United States
- State: Nevada
- County: Clark
- Communities: Echo Bay, Nevada; Overton Beach, Nevada; (Callville Bay Resort and Marina); Overton, Nevada
- Borders on: Muddy Mountains; Lake Mead; Black Mountains (Nevada); Black Mountains (Arizona)
- Coordinates: 36°18′30″N 114°37′48″W
- River: Bitter Spring Wash
- Lake: Lake Mead
- Interactive map of Bitter Spring Valley

The Bitter Spring Valley is a 13-mile (21 km) long valley located northeast of Las Vegas, Nevada on the west edge of Lake Mead, on the north-trending Overton Arm, (of the Virgin River, and Meadow Valley Wash).

The valley is a small valley basin located between two bordering mountain ranges. The Bitter Spring Wash exits east-northeastwards into the Overton Arm of Lake Mead, at Echo Bay, Nevada. The Valley of Fire State Park lies adjacent north, on the north side of the Muddy Mountains. An unimproved route, named Bitter Spring Trail traverses the Muddy Mountains and the valley from paved routes from Echo Bay to Valley of Fire Highway, and Interstate 15.

== Description ==
Bitter Spring Valley is about 13 mi (21 km) in width. The arc shaped 4 mi (6.4 km) long Bitter Ridge separates the longer South Section from a North Section surrounded by the Muddy Mountains west, northwest, and north. The North Section drains southeastwards into two washes that meet the South Section. The washes in the South Section combine to flow east-northeast to Echo Bay, Overton Arm.

Muddy Peak, at 5,363 feet (1,635 m), borders the valley directly west and is adjacent to, but not connected to, Bitter Ridge, about 1.5 mi (2.4 km) east of Muddy Peak.

== Access ==
North Shore Road, from Nevada State Route 564, Henderson, Nevada is the major southern route to Echo Bay, and the east region of Bitter Spring Valley; North Shore Road traverses the northeast sections of the Black Mountains, which border Lake Mead.

Valley of Fire Highway, from Interstate 15 can access a north route, from Overton Beach, Nevada, at the northeast junction of North Shore Road.

An unimproved route from Echo Bay traverses Bitter Spring Wash, Bitter Spring Valley, then the North Section of the valley, and traverses through the northwest of the Muddy Mountains to meet Valley of Fire Highway.

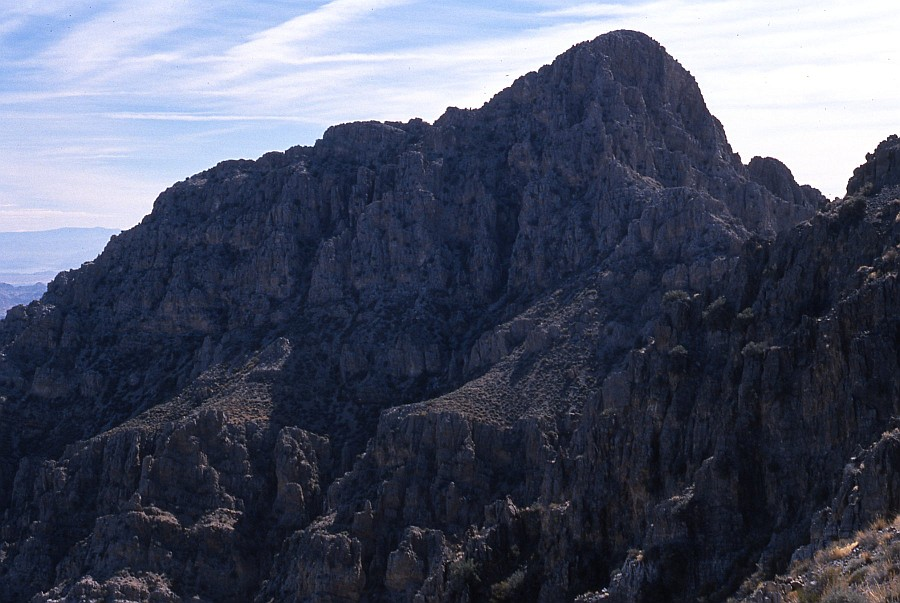
Muddy Peak of the Muddy Mountains
