= Boulder Wash =

Ephemeral stream in Clark County, Nevada, US

Boulder Wash is an ephemeral stream or wash in Clark County, Nevada. Its mouth is at its confluence with the Boulder Wash Cove of Lake Mead at an elevation 1,276 feet (389 meters) at when Lake Mead is at its full level. Currently as the reservoir is at a much lower level its mouth is found at approximately 36°10′07″N 114°33′07″W. Its source is at 36°13′36″N 114°31′22″W at an elevation of 2,841 feet (866 meters) in the Black Mountains. It flows down a canyon into the upper Pinto Valley southwestward before turning southeastward to Boulder Wash Cove.

== History ==
Boulder Wash was part of the original 1829 Armijo Route of the Old Spanish Trail along the Colorado River, between the mouth of the Virgin River and mouth of Las Vegas Wash. That trail route bypassed the deep narrow gorge of Boulder Canyon through the Black Mountains by way of Boulder Wash, Pinto Valley and Cottonwood Spring to upper Callville Wash which it then followed down to the river. Boulder Wash was a tributary of the Colorado River until the construction of Hoover Dam and the formation of Lake Mead.
