= Gale Hills =

Hill range in Nevada, United States

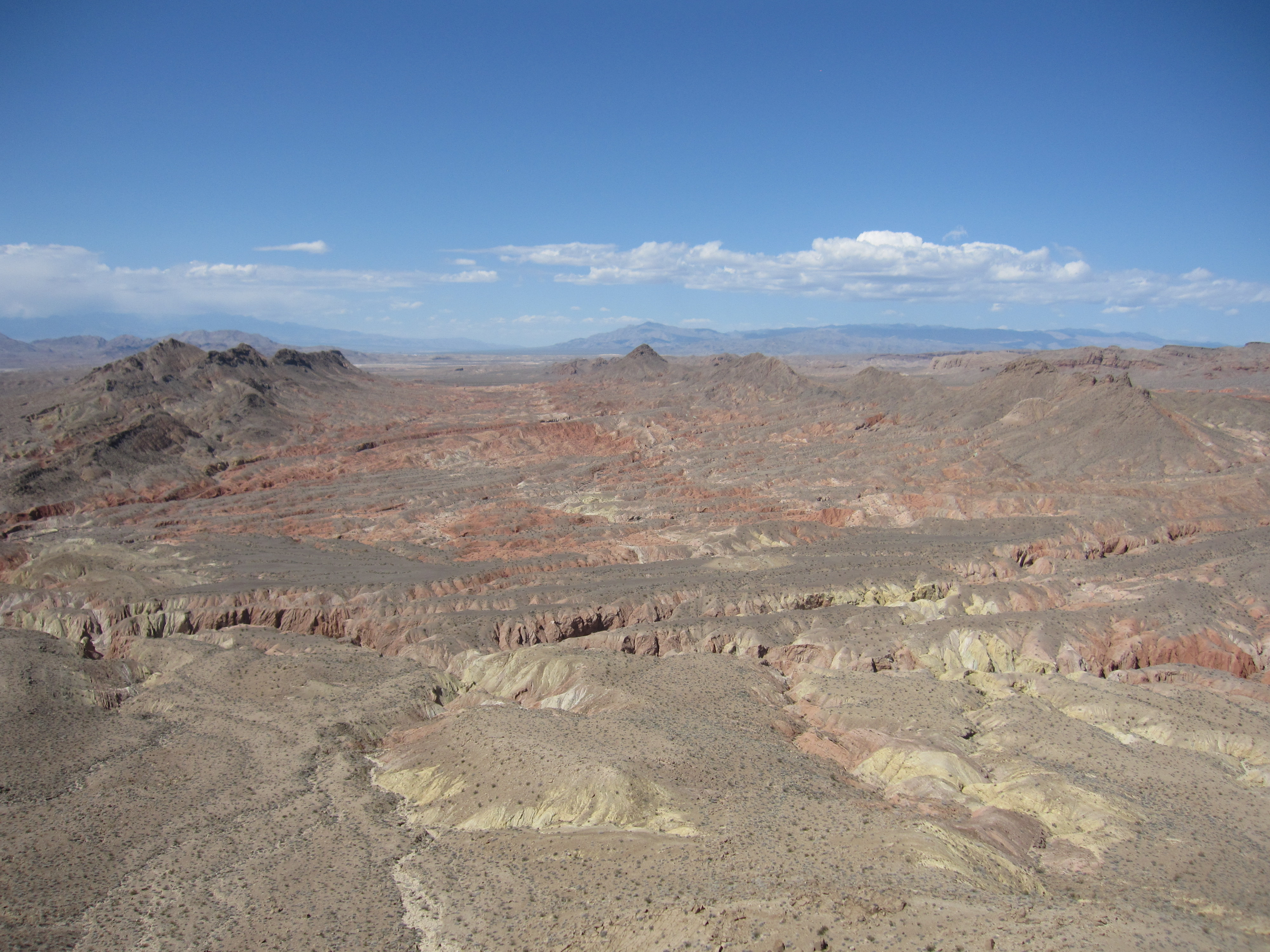

Gale Hills, formerly considered part of the Muddy Range (1879), and later the South Muddy Mountains (1980s), are a range of hills southwest of the Muddy Mountains and about three miles north of the Boulder Basin of Lake Mead, in Clark County, Nevada. It is bounded on the east by Callville Wash; on the south by the Black Mesa lava flows; on the northwest by the valley of Gypsum Wash. Its highpoint is at 36°15′32″N 114°43′12″W which lies at 3,756 feet (1,145 meters).

The Gale Hills were named in 1964 for Hoyt S. Gale (1876–1952), a geologist who conducted the first field examinations of the area. The "Gale anticline" a prominent-structural feature in the area, was first reported by him.
