= Muddy Mountains Wilderness =

Wilderness area in Nevada, US

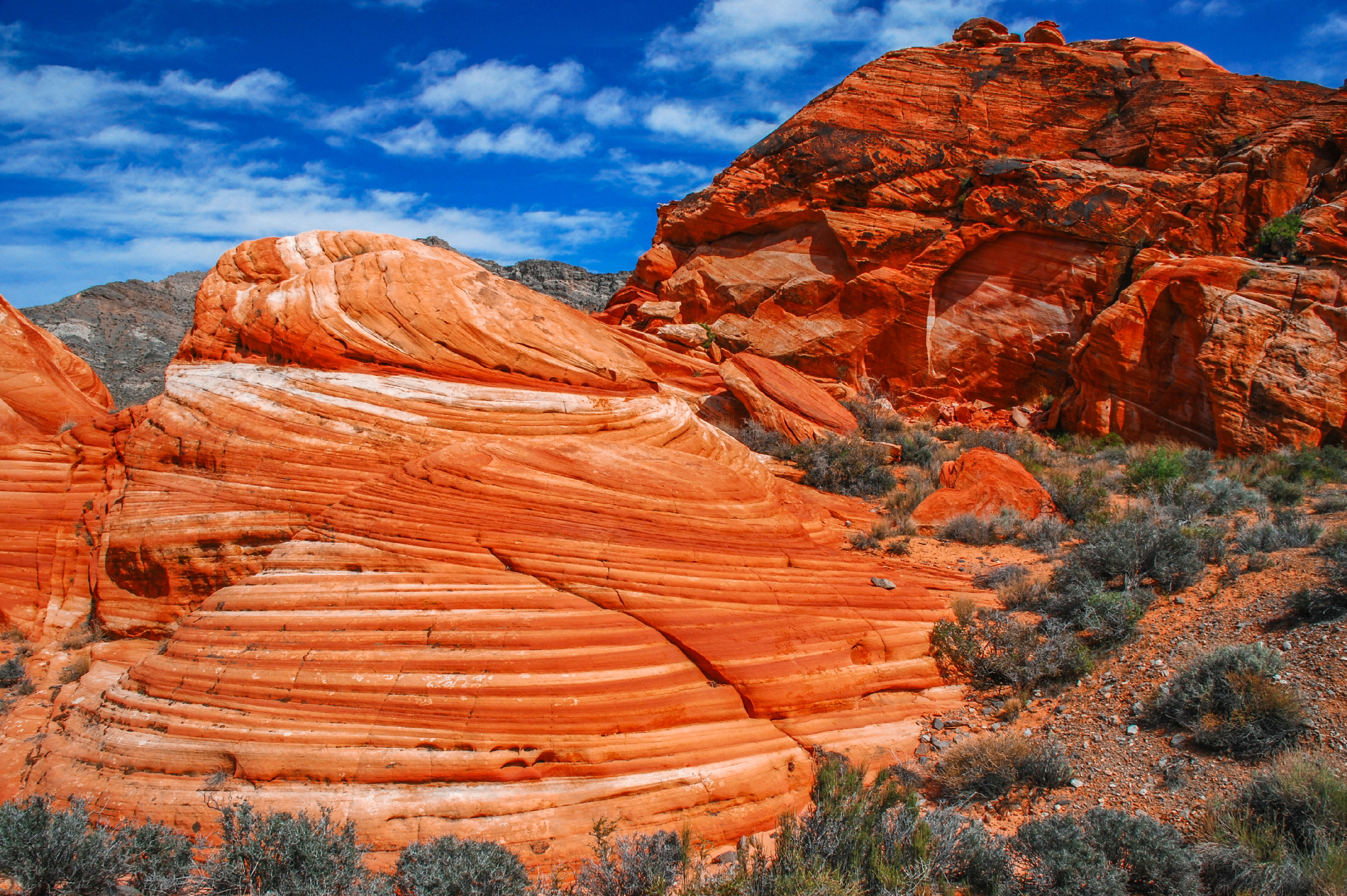
- Cross bedding in Aztec Sandstone in the Muddy Mountains Wilderness

- Location within Nevada
- Location: Clark County, Nevada, United States
- Coordinates: 36.29787°N 114.71361°Whttps://en-us.topographic-map.com/maps/kfqx/Muddy-Mountains-Wilderness-Area/
- Area: 48,154 acres (19,487 ha)
- Governing body: National Park Service and Bureau of Land Management

Muddy Mountains Wilderness Area is a 48,154-acre (19,487 ha)wilderness area, which is a part of the Muddy Mountains in Clark County, Nevada. The area is a part of the Lake Mead National Recreation Area.

== Geography ==
The United States Congress designated the Muddy Mountains Wilderness in 2002. The area is managed by the Bureau of Land Management and the National Park Service.

From the wilderness, Lake Mead can be seen clearly. It is estimated that before 300 million years, the area was at the bottom of the sea. The elevation in the area ranges from 1,700 feet (520 m) to 5,400 feet (1,600 m).

The Muddy Mountains Wilderness area was a part of Mojave people's habitat.

Rock artifacts, rock art, and rock shelters can be found in the wilderness, left from people who have inhabited the area for centuries.

=== Flora and Fauna ===
In the Muddy Mountains Wilderness, creosote, desert catalpa trees and rare plants like bear poppy can be seen. Las Vegas buckwheat also thrives in the lower parts of the wilderness. Animals like bighorn sheep, desert tortoise and Gila monsters also roam this area between the mountain.
