= Gypsum (disambiguation) =

Gypsum is a soft mineral composed of calcium sulfate dihydrate.

Gypsum may also refer to:

== Places ==
- Gypsum, Bhutan, a village

=== United States ===
- Gypsum, Colorado, a home rule municipality
- Gypsum, Kansas, a city
- Gypsum Township, Saline County, Kansas
- Gypsum Township, Sedgwick County, Kansas
- Gypsum, Ohio, an unincorporated community
- Gypsum Creek, a stream in Kansas
- Gypsum Wash, a wash or stream in Nevada

== See also ==
- Richard Gypson (c. 1811 – ?), English balloonist
