= Elephant Rock (Valley of Fire) =

Mountain in Nevada, United States

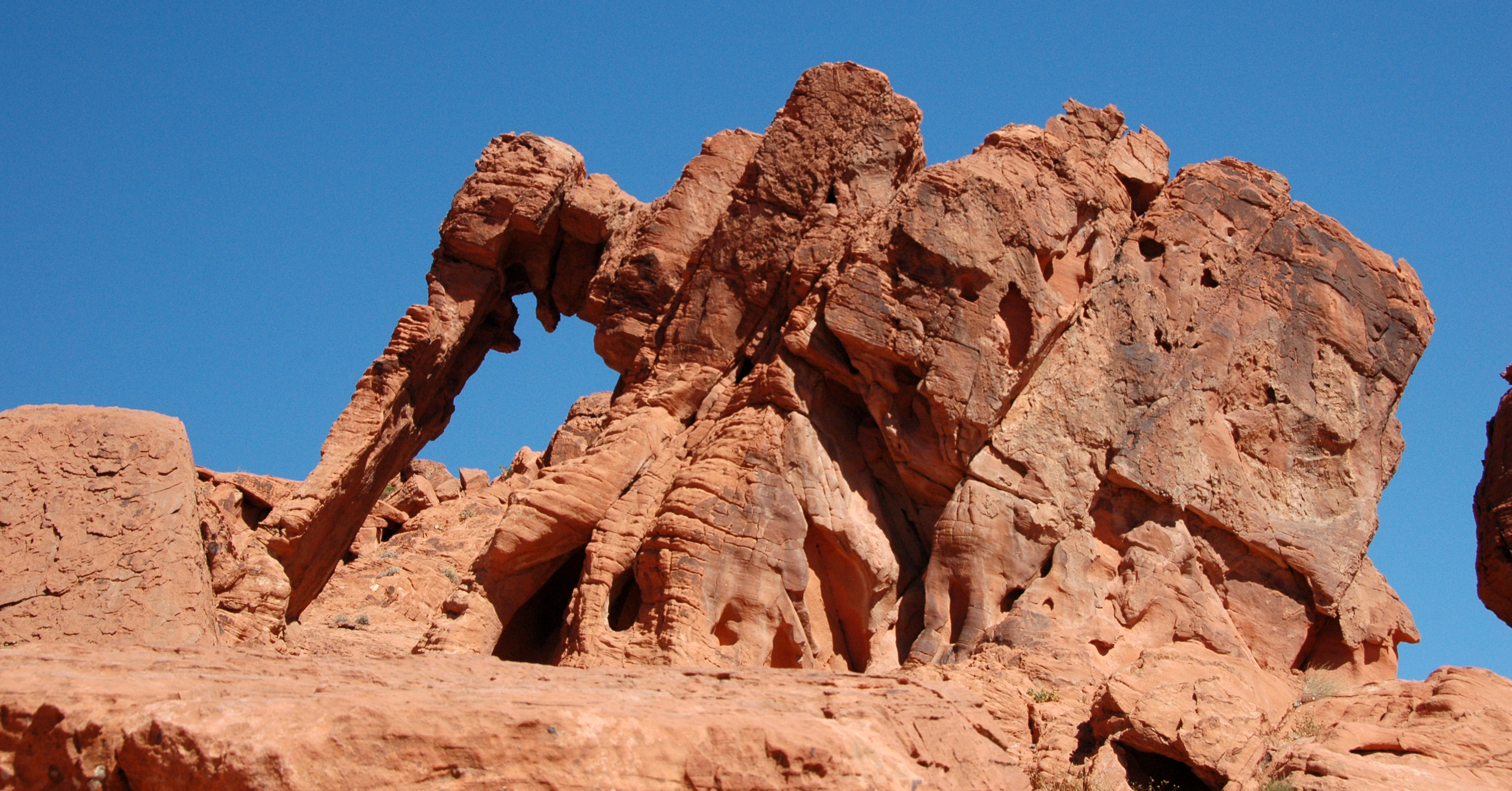
- South aspect of the arch

Highest point
- Elevation: 1,926 ft (587 m)
- Prominence: 32 ft (9.8 m)
- Parent peak: The 5-Arch
- Isolation: 0.78 mi (1.26 km)
- Coordinates: 36°25′42″N 114°27′39″W

Geography
- Location within Nevada Location within the United States
- Country: United States
- State: Nevada
- County: Clark
- Protected area: Valley of Fire State Park
- Parent range: Great Basin Ranges
- Topo map: USGS Valley of Fire East

Geology
- Rock age: Early Jurassic
- Rock type: Aztec Sandstone

Climbing
- Easiest route: class 3 scrambling

Elephant Rock is a 1,926-foot-elevation (587-meter) summit in Clark County, Nevada, United States.

== Description ==
Elephant Rock is located 42 miles (68 km) northeast of downtown Las Vegas in the Valley of Fire State Park near the park's east entrance. The landform is one of the most photographed attractions within the park. It is set in the Mojave Desert and it is one of the most famous sandstone features in Nevada. Elephant Rock is composed of Aztec Sandstone which formed as lithified sand dunes in a desert about 180–190 million years ago during the Early Jurassic. Precipitation runoff from the landform drains east to Lake Mead via Thomas Wash and Valley of Fire Wash. Topographic relief is modest as the summit rises 120 feet (37 meters) above the Valley of Fire Road in 265 feet (81 m). Access to the arch is from a 0.25-mile trail that starts at a roadside parking lot with information and restrooms. This landform's descriptive toponym, which derives its name from a much-photographed natural arch that resembles an elephant, has been officially adopted by the U.S. Board on Geographic Names.

== Climate ==
Elephant Rock is set within the Mojave Desert which has hot summers and cold winters. Due to the elevation and aridity, temperatures drop sharply after sunset. Summer nights are comfortably cool. Winter highs are generally above freezing, and winter nights are bitterly cold, with temperatures often dropping well below freezing.

== See also ==
- Great Basin

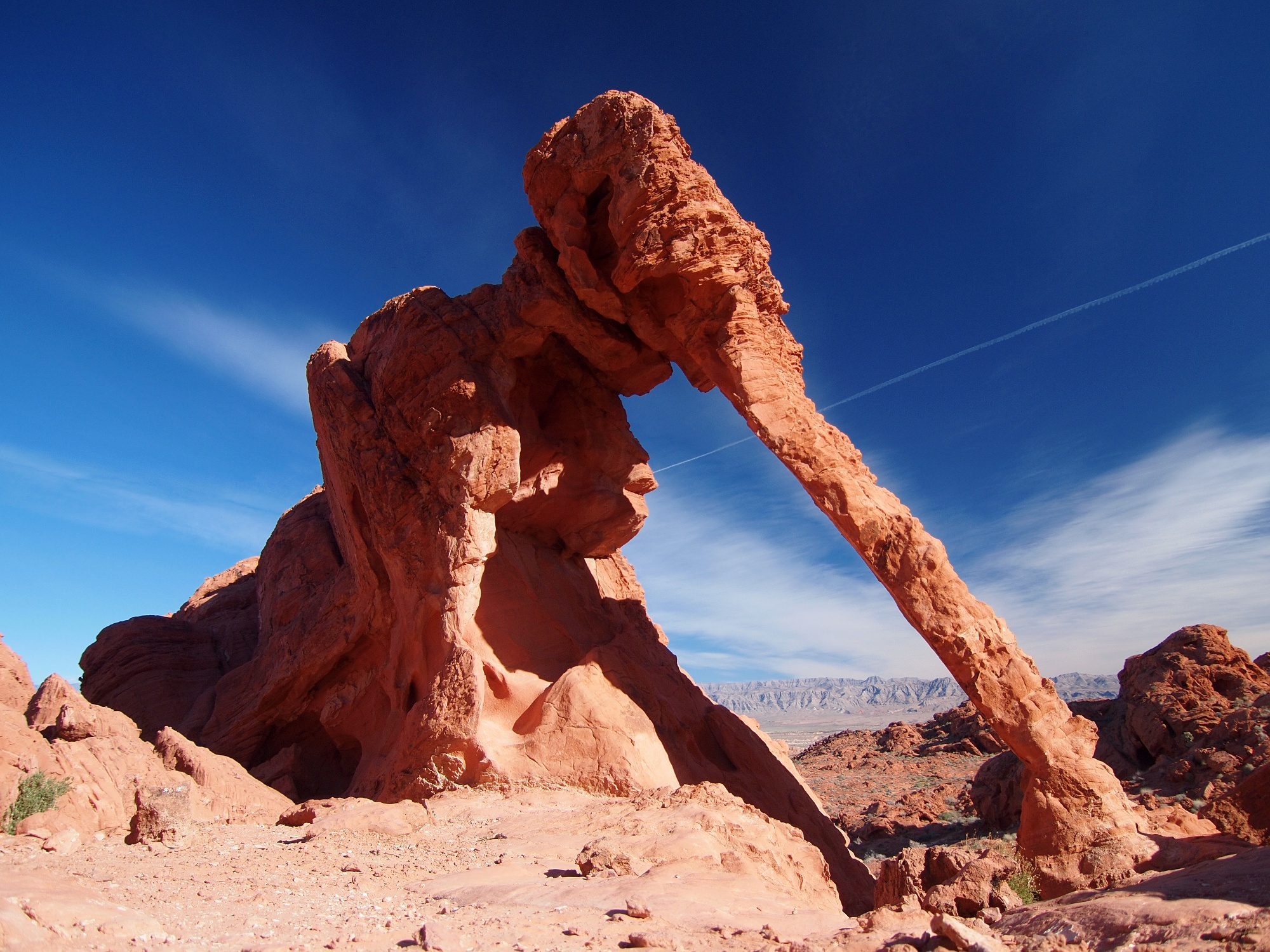
The namesake arch of Elephant Rock
