= West End Wash =

Ephemeral stream in Clark County, Nevada, US

West End Wash is an ephemeral stream or wash in Clark County, Nevada. Its mouth is at its confluence with the Callville Wash of Lake Mead at an elevation 1,250 feet (380 meters) at when Lake Mead is at its full level. Currently as the reservoir is at a much lower level its mouth is found at approximately 36°08′24″N 114°42′57″W. Its source is at 36°15′55″N 114°43′58″W at 3,083 feet (940 meters) in the Gale Hills.

West End Wash was originally a tributary of Callville Wash, known as West Fork Callville Wash, whose confluence with Callville Wash is now under Callville Bay. Following the creation of Lake Mead it now flows into Callville Bay, at 36°08′24″N 114°42′57″W and was renamed West End Wash.
