= Jimbilnan Wilderness =

Wilderness area in Nevada

- IUCN category Ib (wilderness area)
- Location: Clark County, Nevada, USA
- Nearest city: Las Vegas, Nevada
- Coordinates: 36°0′23.93″N 114°51′7.95″W
- Area: 18,879 acres (76.40 km^{2})
- Established: 2002
- Governing body: National Park Service

Jimbilnan Wilderness is an 18,879 acre (7,640 ha) wilderness area that starts from the northeast side of the Black Mountains and extends eastward towards Lake Mead. On its west side lies Pinto Valley Wilderness Park, and Las Vegas can be found 40 miles (64 km) west from the area. Jimbilnan Wilderness was designated as a wilderness area in 2002 and is under the management of the National Park Service.

== Geography ==
The terrain of the Jimbilnan Wilderness is quite diverse, from canyons that sprawl from the Black Mountains range to three washes that plateaued towards Lake Mead. The area is also well-known for several rare floras, the Beaver Dam milkvetch and the sticky buckwheat. A variety of bird species make their home in this wilderness area, including the red-tailed hawk, the white-crowned sparrow, and bald eagles.

== See also ==
- List of wilderness areas in the United States
