= Cottonwood Spring =

Cottonwood Spring may refer to:

- Cottonwood Spring (Black Mountains, Nevada)
- Cottonwood Spring (Blue Diamond, Nevada)
