= Nevada State Route 40 =

U.S. Route 40 (Nevada)

Nevada State Route 40 (1935)

Nevada State Route 40

Nevada State Route 40 may refer to:

- U.S. Route 40 (Nevada), replaced by Interstate 80
- Nevada State Route 40 (1935), which existed until the 1970s renumbering
