= Crystal, Nevada =

Crystal is the name of two locations in Nevada:

- Crystal, Clark County, Nevada
- Crystal, Nye County, Nevada
