= Willow Tank Formation =

Geologic formation in North America

- Stratigraphic range: Late Cretaceous, Cenomanian
- Type: Geological formation
- Underlies: Baseline Sandstone
- Overlies: Aztec Sandstone
- Thickness: unknown

Lithology
- Primary: Claystone, conglomerate, sandstone

Location
- Coordinates: 36°27′22″N 114°31′59″W
- Approximate paleocoordinates: 20.8°N 53.4°W
- Region: Nevada
- Country: United States
- Extent: Valley of Fire, Nevada

The Willow Tank Formation is a geologic formation which outcrops in the U.S. state of Nevada. Initially believed to be of Early Cretaceous (Albian) age, later studies have concluded that it was more likely to be of Late Cretaceous (Cenomanian) age, making it equivalent to the Wayan Formation and the Mussentuchit Member of the Cedar Mountain Formation. It was deposited in an anastomosed fluvial system.

== Fossil records ==
The list is primarily based on Bonde (2008) and Bonde et al. (2008), unless stated otherwise.

Color key: Taxon / Reclassified taxon / Taxon falsely reported as present / Dubious taxon or junior synonym / Ichnotaxon / Ootaxon / Morphotaxon	Notes; Uncertain or tentative taxa are in small text; ~~crossed out~~ taxa are discredited.

=== Plants ===
Plants of the Willow Tank Formation
Genus	Species	Presence	Materials	Notes	Images
Cladophlebis	C. sp.				
Matonia	M. sp.				

=== Gastropods ===
Gastropods of the Willow Tank Formation
Genus	Species	Presence	Materials	Notes	Images
Gastropoda	indeterminate		Single shell		

=== Fish ===
Fishes of the Willow Tank Formation
Genus	Species	Presence	Materials	Notes	Images
Ceratodus	C. sp.		Teeth plates		
Lepisosteidae	indeterminate		Ganoid scales, rectangular to rhoombohedral in shape		
Holostean	indeterminate		Ganoid scales, polygonal in shape		

=== Testudines ===
Turtles of the Willow Tank Formation
Genus	Species	Presence	Materials	Notes	Images
Naomichelys	N. speciosa		Carapace and plastron elements		
Baenidae	indeterminate		Shell elements and a pelvic girdle		
cf. Adocus	cf. A. sp.		Several shell specimens		
?Trionychidae	indeterminate		Fragmentary specimens		

=== Crocodylomorphs ===
Crocodylomorphs of the Willow Tank Formation
Genus	Species	Presence	Materials	Notes	Images
Crocodylomorpha	indeterminate		Dental elements and scutes		

=== Dinosaurs ===
Dinosaurs of the Willow Tank Formation
Genus	Species	Presence	Materials	Notes	Images
Theropoda	indeterminate		Dental elements, and two different eggshell morphotypes	One of the eggshell morphotype shows similarities with Macroelongatoolithus carylei	
Tyrannosauroidea	indeterminate		Dental elements		
Dromaeosauridae	indeterminate		Femur, tibia and teeth		
Titanosauriformes	indeterminate		Single tooth		
Nevadadromeus	N. schmitti		Partial skeleton		
Iguanodontia	indeterminate		Teeth and partial skeleton	Includes Iguanodon-grade taxa and hadrosaur-grade taxa according to Bonde (2008).	
Thyreophora	indeterminate		Dental remains		
