= Callville =

Callville may refer to:

- Callville Bay, Nevada, U.S.
- Callville, Nevada, a former settlement, now submerged under Lake Mead
- Callville Wash, stream or wash in Clark County, Nevada, U.S.
