= Callville Wash =

Ephemeral stream in Clark County, Nevada, US

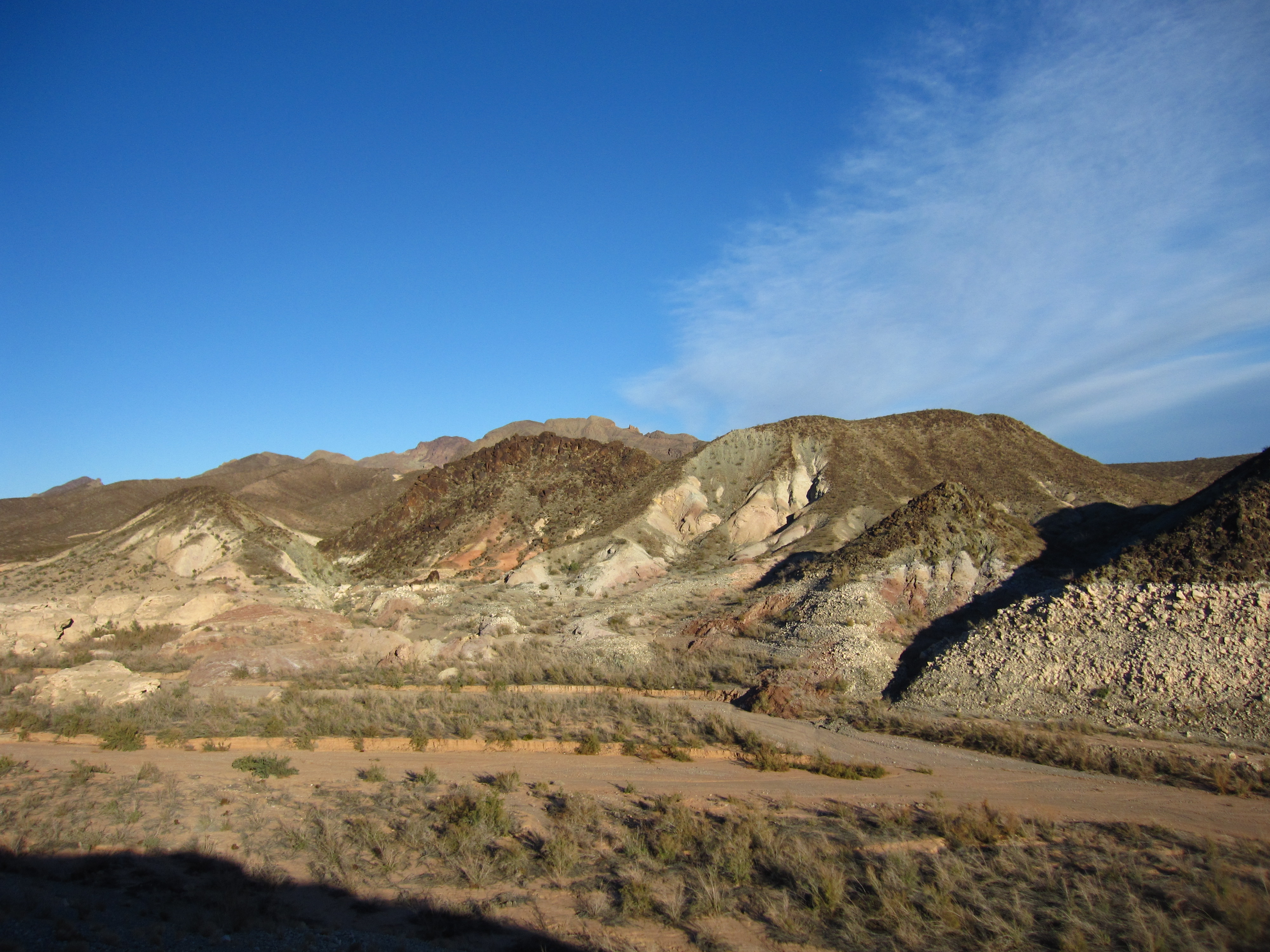
Callville Wash, 2012

Callville Wash is an ephemeral stream or wash in Clark County, Nevada. It was named for Callville the riverport settlement founded in 1866, at its mouth where it had its original confluence with the Colorado River.

Its mouth is at its confluence with Callville Bay, at an elevation of 1,234 feet (376 meters) when Lake Mead is at its full level. Currently as the reservoir is at a much lower level its mouth is found at approximately 36°08′3″N 114°42′38″W. Its source is located at an elevation of 3,510 feet (1,070 meters) at 36°16′35″N 114°41′00″W on the southern slope of Muddy Peak (5,387 ft / 1,642 m) in the Muddy Mountains.

Callville Wash originally had a tributary, originally known as West Fork Callville Wash, whose confluence with Callville Wash is now under Callville Bay. Following the creation of Lake Mead it now flows into Callville Bay, at 36°08′24″N 114°42′57″W and is known as West End Wash.

== History ==
Callville Wash was part of the original 1829 Armijo Route of the Old Spanish Trail along the Colorado River, between the mouth of the Virgin River and mouth of Las Vegas Wash. That trail route bypassed the deep narrow gorge of Boulder Canyon through the Black Mountains by way of Boulder Wash, Pinto Valley and Cottonwood Spring to upper Callville Wash which it then followed down to the river. Later the road between St. Thomas and Callville passed along this wash then northeasterly toward St. Thomas.
