= Navahopus =

Navahopus Temporal range: Early Jurassic, 189.6–175.6 Ma

Trace fossil classification
- Domain: Eukaryota
- Kingdom: Animalia
- Phylum: Chordata
- Clade: Dinosauria
- Clade: Saurischia
- Clade: †Sauropodomorpha
- Ichnofamily: †Navahopodidae
- Ichnogenus: †Navahopus; Baird, 1980

Type ichnospecies
- †Navahopus falcipollex Baird, 1980

Other ichnospecies
- †N. coyoteensis Milàn et al., 2008

Synonyms
- Navajopus (sic)

Dinosaur footprint

Navahopus is an ichnogenus of dinosaur footprint that was made by an indeterminate navahopodid sauropodomorph once thought to have been a prosauropod that was alive during the Early Jurassic in southwestern United States. Two ichnospecies are known: the type ichnospecies, N. falcipollex (named in 1980) and a second species, N. coyoteensis (named in 2008). It is known from the Early Jurassic of Arizona (Aztec Sandstone and Navajo Sandstone), California (Aztec Sandstone) and Utah.

== See also ==
- List of dinosaur ichnogenera
