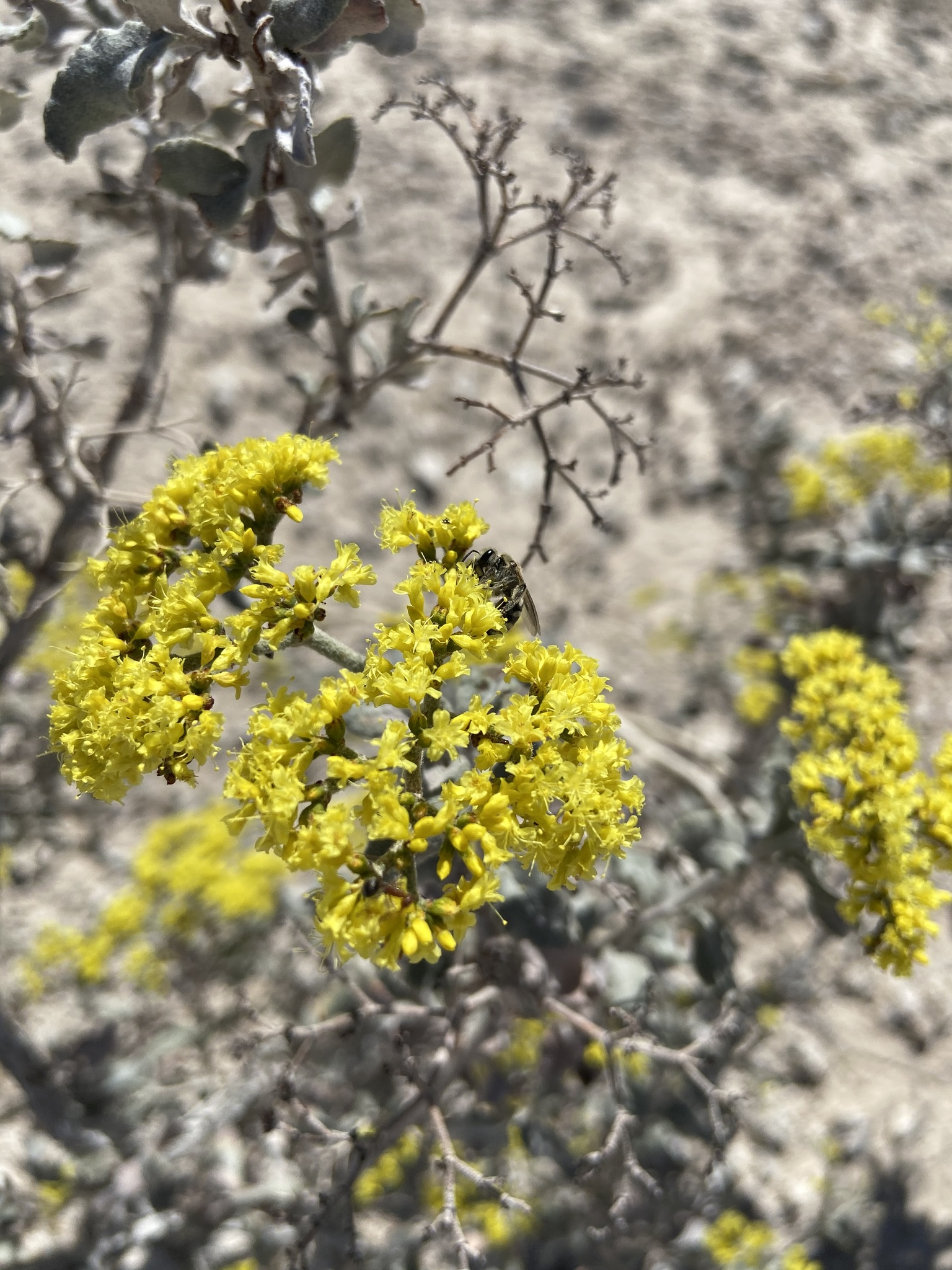

Scientific classification
- Kingdom: Plantae
- Clade: Tracheophytes
- Clade: Angiosperms
- Clade: Eudicots
- Order: Caryophyllales
- Family: Polygonaceae
- Genus: Eriogonum
- Species: E. corymbosum
- Variety: E. c. var. nilesii

Trinomial name
- Eriogonum corymbosum var. nilesii Reveal

= Eriogonum corymbosum var. nilesii =

Variety of wild buckwheat

Eriogonum corymbosum var. nilesii is a rare variety of Eriogonum corymbosum, a species of Polygonaceae, commonly known as Nile's wild buckwheat, Las Vegas buckwheat, or golden buckwheat. The plant can be found in the Mojave Desert, located in the Las Vegas Valley and Muddy Mountains region of Clark County, Nevada.
