= Omidyar-Tufts Microfinance Fund =

The Omidyar-Tufts Microfinance Fund is a microfinance investment firm established on 4 November 2005 by Ebay founder and social entrepreneur Pierre Omidyar and his wife Pam donated $100 million to their alma mater Tufts University to create the fund, which will offer millions of tiny loans to entrepreneurs in developing countries.
