= Boulder Wash Cove =

Cove in Lake Mead, Clark County, Nevada

Coordinates: 36°09′54″N 114°32′59″W

Boulder Wash Cove is a cove in Lake Mead, in Clark County, Nevada. Boulder Wash for which the cove is named has its mouth in the cove at an elevation of 1,204 / 367 meters when the reservoir is at its full level.
