= Pierre Omidyar =

Entrepreneur, philanthropist, and founder of eBay (born 1967)

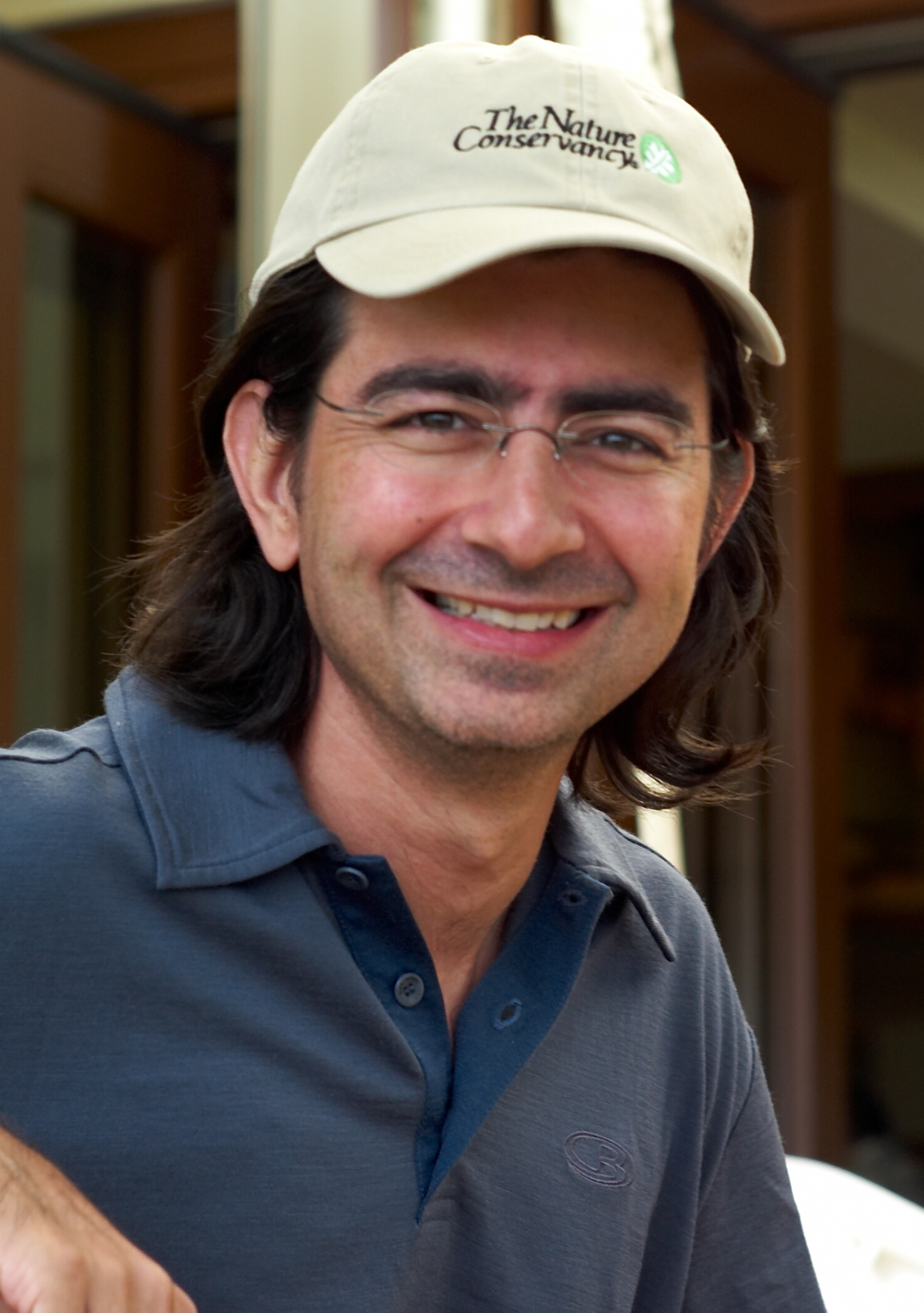
- Omidyar in 2007
- Born: Parviz Morad Omidyar; June 21, 1967 (age 59); Paris, France
- Citizenship: Iran; France; United States
- Education: Tufts University (BS)
- Occupations: Founder of eBay; Founder of Honolulu Civil Beat; Founder of Ulupono Initiative; Founder of Omidyar Network; Founder of First Look Media
- Board member of: eBay
- Spouse: Pamela Kerr

Pierre Morad Omidyar (born Parviz Morad Omidyar, June 21, 1967) is a French-born Iranian-American billionaire. A technology entrepreneur, software engineer, and philanthropist, he is the founder of eBay, where he served as chairman from 1998 to 2015. Omidyar is the grandson of the Imperial Iranian Army General Mahmud Mir-Djalali, who was instrumental in the 1921 rise of the Pahlavi Dynasty, the overthrow of Mohammad Mossadegh, and the building out of Iran's Mechanized Artillery Forces and Defense Industries. As of August 2026, Forbes ranked Omidyar as the 255th-richest person in the world with an estimated net worth of $12.5 billion.

Omidyar and his wife Pamela founded Omidyar Network in 2004, becoming a long-term Democratic Party donor. Since 2010, he has been involved in online journalism as the head of investigative reporting and public affairs news service Honolulu Civil Beat. In 2013, he announced that he would create and finance First Look Media, a journalism venture to include Glenn Greenwald, Laura Poitras, and Jeremy Scahill.

== Early life and education ==
Parviz Morad Omidyar was born on June 21, 1967, in Paris, to Iranian parents who had immigrated to France for higher education. His mother, Elahé Mir-Djalali, was an academic in linguistics, while his father, Cyrus Omidyar, was a surgeon. His maternal grandfather was General Mahmud Mir-Djalali, a former Vice Chairman of the General Staff of the Imperial Iranian Armed Forces, and was widely regarded as the "father" of Iran's military industries and tank forces.

Omidyar's family immigrated to the United States when he was a child. He attended Punahou School in Honolulu for two years, and now serves on the school's board of trustees. His interest in computers began while he was a ninth-grade student at The Potomac School in McLean, Virginia. He graduated high school in 1984 at St. Andrew's Episcopal School, in Potomac, Maryland, and then entered Tufts University, where he graduated with a degree in computer science in 1988.

== Career ==
Shortly after studying at Tufts, Omidyar started working for Claris, an Apple Computer subsidiary. He worked with the team that upgraded MacDraw to MacDraw II. In 1991, he co-founded Ink Development, a pen-based computing startup that later was rebranded as an e-commerce company and renamed eShop Inc.

Microsoft acquired eShop on June 11, 1996, for less than $50 million, and Omidyar earned $1 million from the deal.

=== Founding eBay ===
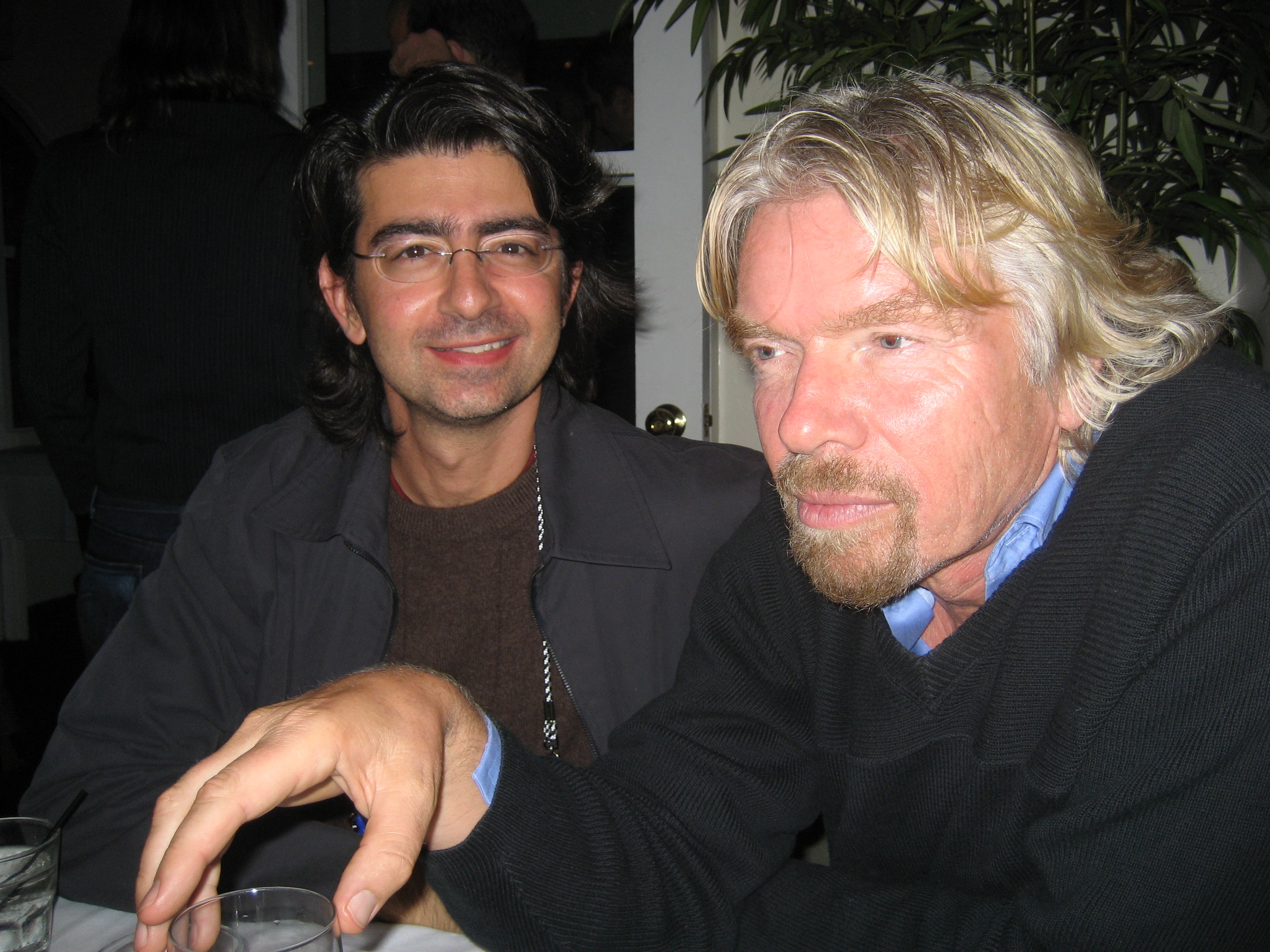
Omidyar with Richard Branson

In 1995, at 28, Omidyar began to write the original computer code for an online venue to enable the listing of a direct person-to-person auction for collectible items. He created a simple prototype on his web page. On Labor Day, Monday, September 4, 1995, he launched an online service called Auction Web, which would eventually be developed as the auction site eBay.

The service was originally one of several items on Omidyar's website eBay.com. His website also had a section devoted to the Ebola virus, among other topics.

The first item sold on the eBay site was a broken laser pointer. Omidyar was astonished that anyone would pay for a broken device, but the buyer assured him that he was deliberately collecting broken laser pointers. Similar surprises followed. The business exploded as correspondents began registering a wide variety of trade goods.

Omidyar incorporated the enterprise; his small fee on each sale financed the site's expansion. The revenue soon outstripped his salary at General Magic and nine months later, Omidyar decided to dedicate his full attention to his new enterprise.

By 1996, when Omidyar signed a licensing deal to offer airline tickets online, the site had hosted 250,000 auctions. In the first month of 1997, it hosted two million. By the middle of that year, eBay hosted nearly 800,000 auctions daily.

In 1997, Omidyar changed the company's name from AuctionWeb to eBay and began advertising the service aggressively. The name "eBay" was his second choice. His first choice was registered to a Canadian mining company, Echo Bay Mines. He originally wanted Echo Bay, the name of a recreational area near Lake Mead, Nevada, because it "sounded cool". When he learned that echobay.com was taken, he dropped the "cho", and ebay.com was born. The frequently repeated story that eBay was founded to help Omidyar's fiancée trade Pez candy dispensers was fabricated by a public relations manager in 1997 to interest the media. This was revealed in Adam Cohen's 2002 book The Perfect Store, and confirmed by eBay.

== Later years ==
Jeffrey Skoll joined the company in 1996. In March 1998, Meg Whitman was elected president and CEO. She ran the company until January 2008, when she announced her retirement. In September 1998, eBay launched a successful public offering, making both Omidyar and Skoll billionaires.

In 2002, eBay bought PayPal, an online payment company. Later, in 2015, they spun PayPal off. Omidyar still owns 6% of its worth.

As of July 2008, Omidyar's 178 million eBay shares were worth around $4.45 billion. Omidyar is an investor in Montage Resort and Spa in Laguna Beach, California.

Omidyar is also a member of the Berggruen Institute's 21st Century Council.

In 2020, Omidyar stepped down from the board of eBay as part of a broader overhaul of the company. He has, however, stayed active in the company, retaining the title of director emeritus.

== News media businesses ==
In 2010, Omidyar launched an online investigative reporting news service, Honolulu Civil Beat, covering civic affairs in Hawaii. The site was named Best News Website in Hawaii for 2010, 2011, and 2012. On September 4, 2013, Honolulu Civil Beat started a partnership with HuffPost, launching HuffPost Hawaii.

In 2013, prompted by the Edward Snowden leaks, Omidyar announced the creation of the journalism venture First Look Media, which on February 10, 2014, launched The Intercept, drawing from journalists such as Glenn Greenwald, Laura Poitras, Jeremy Scahill, Dan Froomkin, John Temple, and Jay Rosen.

== Film production ==
Omidyar has been part of the executive producer team for the following films.

- Merchants of Doubt (2014)
- Spotlight (2015)

== Omidyar Group and Omidyar Network ==
=== Omidyar Group ===
Omidyar Group represents a diverse array of companies, organizations, and initiatives associated with Pierre Omidyar and his wife Pam and their philanthropic and business endeavors.

=== Omidyar Network ===
Omidyar Network is a philanthropic investment firm dedicated to harnessing the power of markets to create opportunities for people to improve their lives. It was established in 2004 by Omidyar and his wife, Pam. The organization invests in and helps scale innovative organizations to catalyze economic, social, and political change. Omidyar Network has committed more than $992 million to for-profit companies and nonprofit organizations that foster economic advancement and encourage individual participation across multiple investment areas, including Property Rights, Governance & Citizen Engagement, Education, Financial Inclusion and Consumer & Internet Mobile. In 2010, he and his wife established Enterprise Zimbabwe, along with Richard Branson and the Nduna Foundation (founded by Amy Robbins).

=== Luminate Group ===
Established in 2018 to provide an information platform whose declared mission is to ensure that everyone, even the least able, has the information to influence the decisions that affect their lives and the power to assert their rights. Its vice-president Felipe Estefan, is associated with Omidyar Network's Governance & Citizen Engagement initiative and was formerly a CNN journalist and an Open Government Strategist at the World Bank.

== Personal life ==
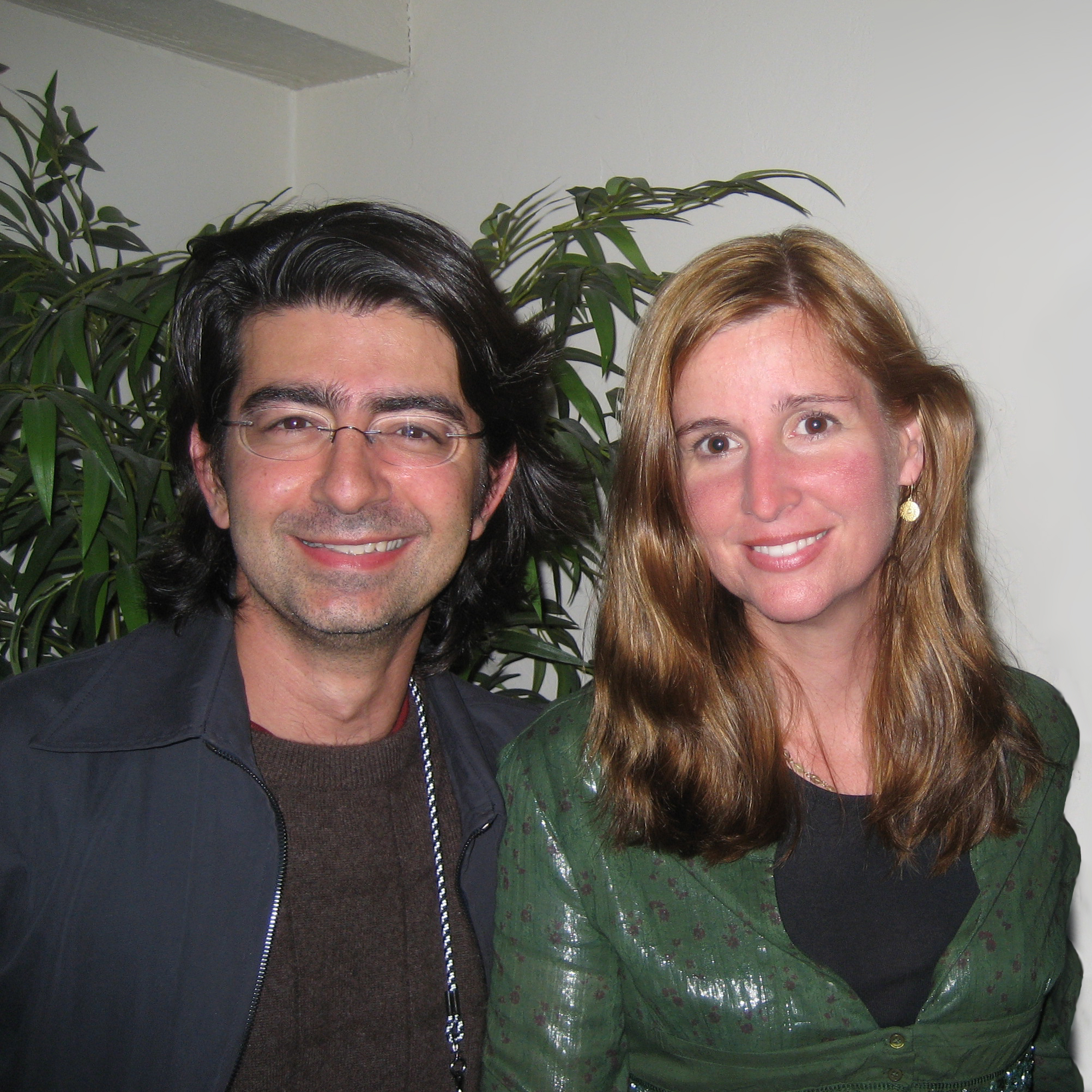
Omidyar with his wife Pamela in 2007

Omidyar and his wife Pamela own properties in Henderson, Nevada and Honolulu, Hawaii. According to Forbes, his net worth was US$13.1 billion as of January 2019. He is a major donor to Democratic Party candidates and organizations. Omidyar is a follower of the Dalai Lama. In 2010, he joined Bill Gates and Warren Buffett as a signatory of The Giving Pledge, and has declared his intention to give away most of his wealth during his lifetime. In 2019, he donated approximately $500 million to charitable causes.

== Antitrust activism and criticism of big tech ==
He has bankrolled groups like the anti-monopoly think tank Open Markets Institute and the digital rights group Public Knowledge Project, in the fight against the big tech companies, which he criticizes as overly powerful and destructive to democracy. His advocacy and philanthropic investment firm the Omidyar Network, distributed widely read papers laying out the antitrust cases against Facebook and Google. In February 2021, his network hosted a series on whistleblowing, and is now providing financial support to Facebook whistleblower Frances Haugen. Omidyar has given funding to the Center for Humane Technology, whose head of public affairs is Haugen's top PR representative in the US.

== Awards and honors ==
- Honorary doctorate, Tufts University (2011)
- 1999 EY Entrepreneur of The Year National Winner

== See also ==
- Iranian diaspora
- Iranian Americans
- Omidyar-Tufts Microfinance Fund
- The World's Billionaires

== Citations ==
General sources

- Alirezaijan, Reza (2025). 'Škodovy závody Teherán:Českoslovenští architekti v říši perského šáha, 1932–1948'. Books & Pipes Brno. ISBN 978-80-7485-302-9.
- Алирезайан, Реза (2025). 'Арьяшахр. Советско-иранский архитектурный опыт'. Tatlin. ISBN 978-5-00075-418-4.
- Cohen, Adam (2002), The Perfect Store: Inside eBay, Back Bay Books, ISBN 978-0-316-16493-1
- Viegas, Jennifer (2006), Pierre Omidyar: The Founder of eBay, Rosen Publishing Group, ISBN 978-1-4042-0715-8

Business positions
New title	Chairman of eBay; 1995–2015	Succeeded by Thomas J. Tierney
