= Valley of Fire Road =

Road and former state route in Nevada, USA

- Map of the Valley of Fire Road in red

Route information
- Maintained by NDOT
- Length: 23.5 mi (37.8 km)
- History: Existed as SR 40 c.1935-1976; Designated scenic byway in 1995
- Known for: Valley of Fire State Park
- Restrictions: State park entry fee required

Major junctions
- West end: I-15 at the Crystal–Moapa River Indian Reservation line
- East end: Northshore Road in Lake Mead NRA

Location
- Country: United States
- State: Nevada
- County: Clark

Highway system
- Nevada State Highway System; Interstate; US; State; Pre‑1976; Scenic

The Valley of Fire Road (also called the Valley of Fire Highway) is a road in northeastern Clark County, Nevada serving the Valley of Fire State Park. The roadway was previously designated State Route 40 (SR 40) and the segment within the state park is currently designated a Nevada Scenic Byway.

== Route description ==
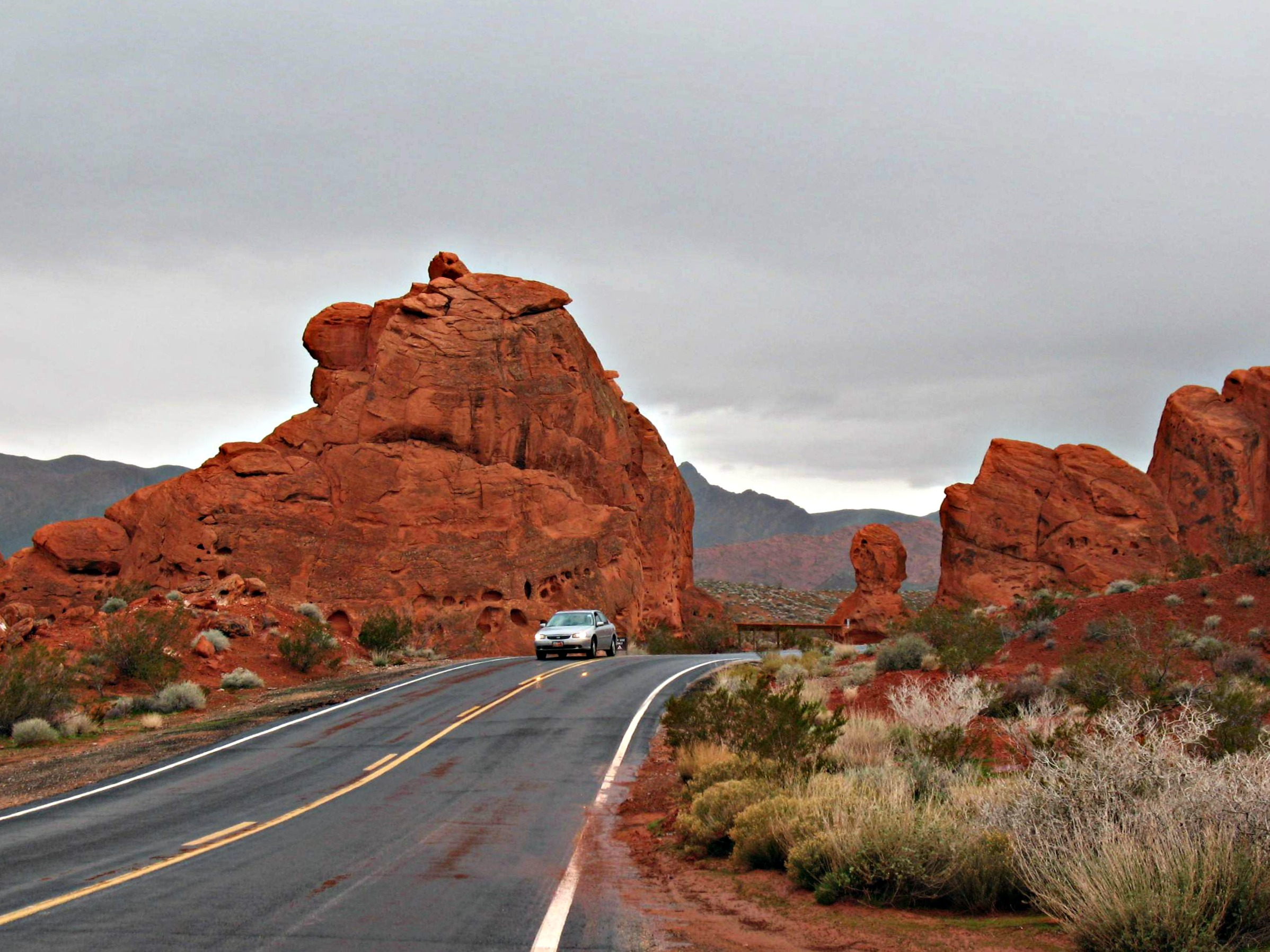
Valley of Fire Road as seen in 2009

The western terminus of the Valley of Fire Road is at the Interstate 15 (I-15) exit 75, located at the former Crystal townsite within the Moapa River Indian Reservation approximately 33 miles (53 km) northeast of downtown Las Vegas. From there, the two-lane highway travels southeasterly about seven miles (11 km) through open desert terrain towards the Muddy Mountains. The road begins to follow more a more hilly and curvaceous path as it meanders through the mountains. Around the 12-mile mark, the road officially enters the Valley of Fire State Park boundary and the scenic route begins, with the state park's west entrance station coming approximately two miles (3.2 km) east of there. Beyond the fee station, Valley of Fire Road traverses the southern reaches of the state park, passing nearby to various campgrounds, trails, the visitor center, and other points of interest. The mountainous landscape adjoining the highway becomes much more colorful, reflective of the terrain featured in the park. Valley of Fire Road spends roughly ten miles (16 km) in the park before passing the east entrance station near Elephant Rock, where the scenic byway designation ends. The roadway reaches its eastern terminus two miles (3.2 km) east of there, at an intersection with Northshore Road within the Lake Mead National Recreation Area approximately nine miles (14 km) south of Overton.

Payment of a state park entrance fee is required to travel on Valley of Fire Road between the west and east entrance stations. As of June 2021, the day use entrance fee is US$10 per vehicle and US$15 per non-Nevada vehicle.

== History ==
The Valley of Fire Road was designated SR 40 c. 1935–1976

A county road appearing in an approximately parallel alignment of the Valley of Fire Road appears on official state highway maps as early as 1933. However, the road proceeded much more easterly from U.S. Route 91 (US 91) and SR 6 at Crystal to connect to SR 12 near St. Thomas, bypassing north of the Valley of Fire. This roadway was marked as State Route 40 by 1935, and was shown along a route connecting Crystal more directly to Overton on SR 12, a distance of roughly 30 miles (48 km). By 1941, SR 40 was moved to a new alignment that resembles the present-day alignment of the Valley of Fire Road—the new routing was an unimproved, 23-mile (37 km) roadway traversing the southern side of the Valley of Fire State Park. The road was finally paved by 1964.

On July 1, 1976, the Nevada Department of Transportation (NDOT) began an effort to renumber its state highways. In this process, the SR 40 designation along Valley of Fire Road was proposed to be combined with SR 12 into a new State Route 169. This new highway designation was first seen on state highway maps in 1978. This action ultimately was not carried out, leaving the Valley of Fire Road without a state route number by 1982. However, as of 2020, the portion of Valley of Fire Road within the state park boundaries is still maintained by NDOT as a state park road.

A 10.5-mile (16.9 km) section of the Valley of Fire Road—the portion between the west and east entrances to the state park—was designated a Nevada Scenic Byway on June 30, 1995.

== Major intersections ==
The entire route is in Clark County.

Location	mi	km	Destinations	Notes
Crystal–Moapa River Indian Reservation line	0.0	0.0	I-15 – Las Vegas, Mesquite	Western terminus; I-15 exit 75
Valley of Fire State Park	14.5	23.3	West entrance fee station	
Valley of Fire State Park	18.9	30.4	Mouse's Tank Road	Serves Valley of Fire Visitor Center and White Domes
Valley of Fire State Park	21.5	34.6	East entrance fee station / Elephant Rock	
Lake Mead NRA	23.5	37.8	Northshore Road – Overton, Lake Mead	Eastern terminus
1.000 mi = 1.609 km; 1.000 km = 0.621 mi
