= Crystal, Clark County, Nevada =

Unincorporated community in Nye County, Nevada, United States

Crystal
- Ghost town
- Location within Nevada
- Coordinates: 36°30′7.33″N 114°45′44.82″W
- Country: United States
- State: Nevada
- County: Clark County

Crystal is a former unincorporated community in Clark County, Nevada, United States. It lies along the Union Pacific Railroad and had a population of 10 in 1941. It is now the site of a highway rest stop.

Historic maps of Nevada locate Crystal, Clark County to be northeast of Las Vegas along Interstate I-15 at Exit 75, which originally was part of the Nevada State Route 40 highway in that area. It is an enclave within the Moapa River Indian Reservation.

The community was presumably named for the crystal deposits near it. It has altitude 2,033 ft (620 m) and was settled in 1905.

== See also ==
- List of ghost towns in Nevada
