= Muddy Peak =

Mountain in Nevada, United States

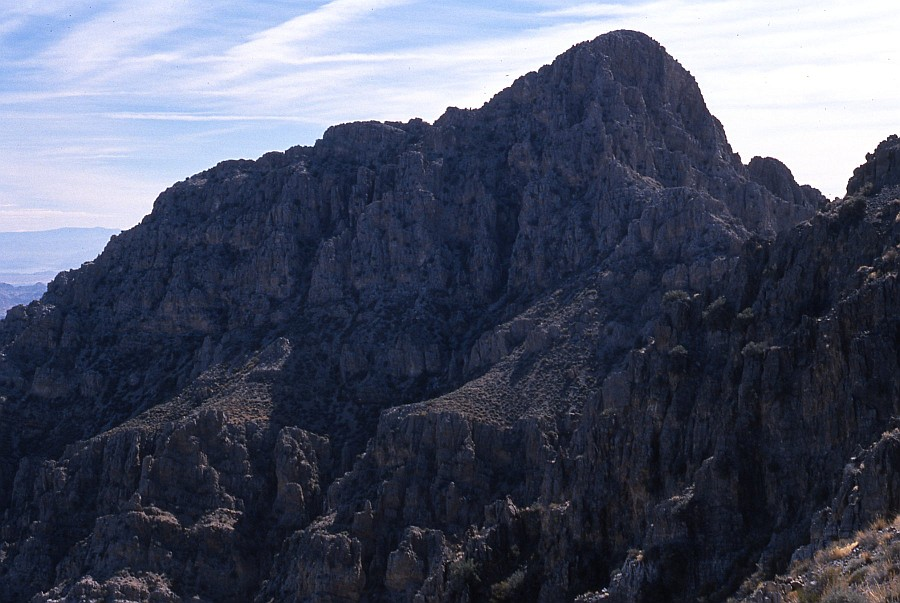
- Muddy Peak

Highest point
- Elevation: 5,387 ft (1,642 m)
- Coordinates: 36°17′54″N 114°41′38″W

Geography
- Location within Nevada
- Location: Clark County, Nevada, U.S.
- Parent range: Muddy Mountains
- Topo map: USGS Muddy Peak

Muddy Peak is the second tallest summit in the Muddy Mountains in Clark County, Nevada. It rises to an elevation of 5,387 feet (1,642 meters).
