= Cottonwood Spring (Black Mountains, Nevada) =

Spring in Nevada, United States

Coordinates: 36°12′00″N 114°38′33″W

Cottonwood Spring is a spring in the Black Mountains, between the west end of Pinto Valley and Callville Wash, at an elevation of 2,205 feet (672 meters).

== History ==
Cottonwood Spring lay along on the riverside trail along the north bank of the Colorado River between the Virgin River and Las Vegas Wash. The trail at the spring was a bypass of the narrow chasm of Boulder Canyon. The spring lay along the west side of the pass through Black Mountains between western end of Pinto Valley and Callville Wash. The trail was part of the Old Spanish Trail pioneered by the Mexican merchant and explorer from Nuevo Mexico, Antonio Armijo in 1829 - 1830.
