= Richard Gypson =

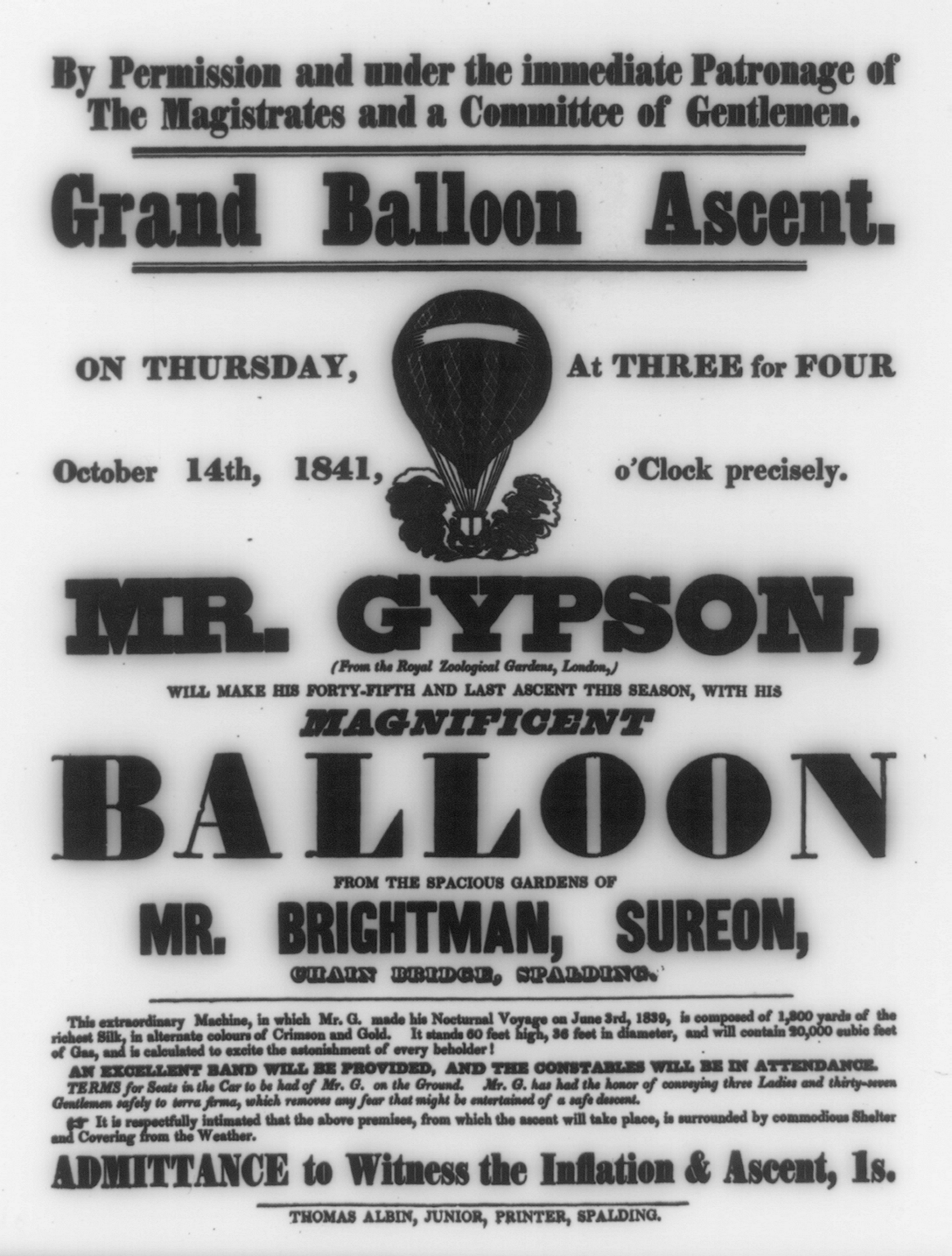
An 1841 poster promoting a balloon ascent by Mr. Gypson

Richard Gypson (c. 1811 – ?), aka Professor Gypson, was an English pioneering professional balloonist.

== Biography ==
His first recorded flight was on 14 May 1832 from London. He worked for Vauxhall Gardens. In April 1839 he made an ascent from the Standard Tavern, City Road in one of Mr H Green's hydrogen filled balloons. By September 1840 he was achieving his 26th ascent, this time in Daventry. He was the first pilot to successfully use an adjustable gas-valve. In 1841 he dropped the first recorded airmail in England. A poster (printed by John Leach, Wisbech) of his ascent from near the Gas Works, Wisbech on Monday, July 1841 is in the Science Museum collection.

In July, 1847 with three passengers he ascended from Vauxhall Gardens at night as part of a fireworks display. The balloon burst in a thunderstorm and the envelope acted as a parachute and all survived. An ascent in July 1843 nearly ended fatally when his balloon came down in the sea and he had to be rescued off Bray-Head. Gypson made a second ascent successfully from Portobello. His last recorded flight was in October 1849. During his 100th ascent the butterfly valve froze when they were at high altitude and Gypson was forced to use a knife to cut a hole in the balloon to release gas and bring the balloon back to ground safely, 59 miles (95 km) from their take off in Bedford, landing in Oxfordshire. In 1853 Gypson, aged 42, before the Middlesex Sessions was convicted of stealing pewter tankards, he was sentenced to one hour in custody and released into the care of his friends. It was reported that his behaviour had become eccentric to the extent that he was referred to as "Mad Gypson". He conducted experiments with 5-foot (1.5 m) diameter model balloons in 1855 at the Botanical Gardens, Sheffield; one travelled as far as Chard, Somerset, a distance of about 200 miles (320 km) in less than three hours.

== Balloons ==
In 1840 he was using a crimson and gold balloon made of 1,800 yards (1,600 m) of silk, 60 feet (18 m) high and 36 feet (11 m) in diameter, containing 20,000 cubic feet (570 m^{3}) of gas, according to a poster.
