= Dry Lake Range =

Mountain range in Nevada, United States

- Location within Nevada

Highest point
- Elevation: 938 m (3,077 ft)

Geography
- Country: United States
- State: Nevada
- District: Clark County
- Range coordinates: 36°25′3.896″N 114°50′16.996″W
- Topo map: USGS Dry Lake

The Dry Lake Range is a mountain range in Clark County, Nevada.
