= Echo Bay, Nevada =

Unincorporated community in Nevada, U.S.

- Unincorporated community
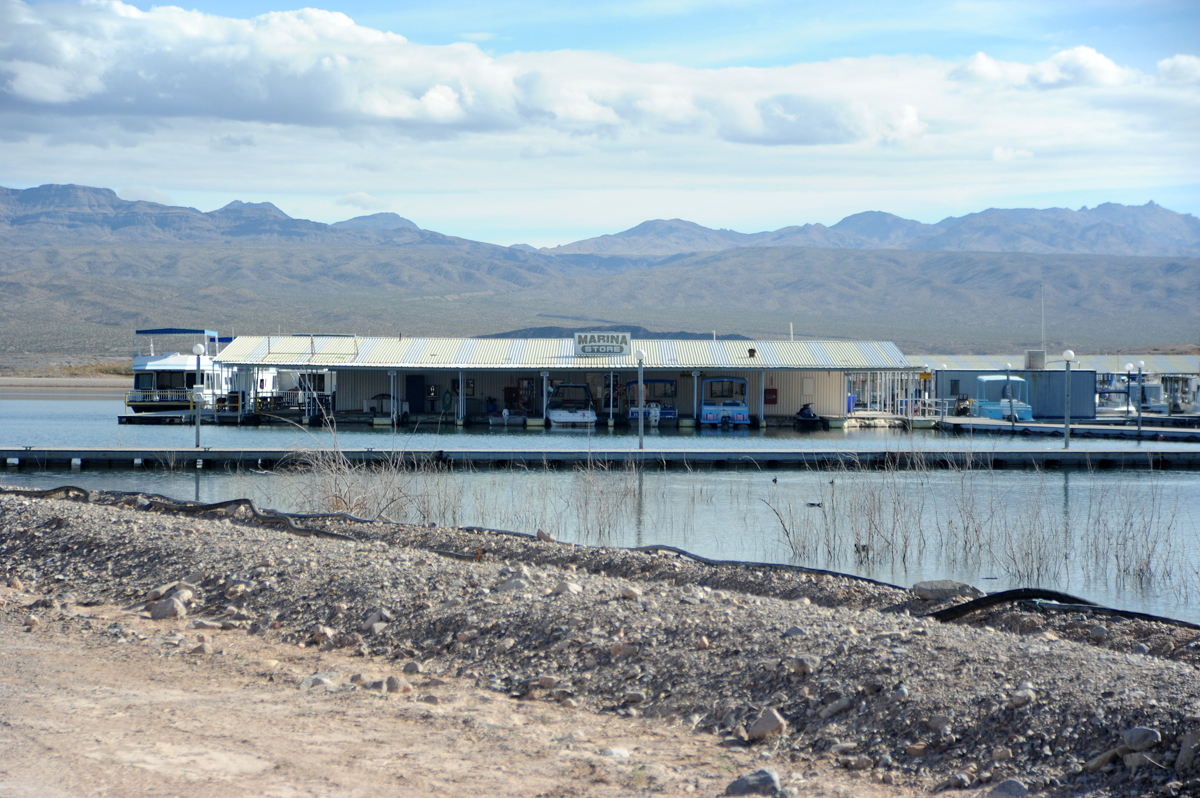
- The marina at Echo Bay, Nevada

- Location within the state of Nevada Echo Bay, Nevada (the United States)
- Coordinates: 36°18′33″N 114°25′39″W
- Country: United States
- State: Nevada
- County: Clark
- Elevation: 1,270 ft (387 m)
- Time zone: UTC-8 (Pacific (PST))
  - Summer (DST): UTC-7 (PDT)
- GNIS feature ID: 849519

Echo Bay is an unincorporated community in the U.S. state of Nevada. It is located on the western shore of the Overton Arm (northern portion of Lake Mead), within the Lake Mead National Recreation Area. The community contains a campground run by the National Park Service and a boat ramp. There used to be a marina there as well, but it closed in February 2013. Approximately 200,000 people visit Echo Bay annually. There was a small trailer park for housing.

Pierre Omidyar, founder of eBay, used to frequent the Echo Bay marina before it closed in 2013, and the area is credited for being the inspiration for the name of the online auction marketplace. He was said to have a fondness for the area and when asked about the reason behind the name choice, he said that Echo Bay "just sounded cool." The web address echobay.com was already taken by a Canadian mining company at the time, so he went with his second choice of eBay.com.
