= Gypsum Wash =

Ephemeral stream in Clark County, Nevada

Location
- Country: United States
- State: Nevada
- County: Clarke County

Gypsum Wash is an ephemeral stream or wash in Clark County, Nevada. Gypsum Wash was originally a tributary of Las Vegas Wash before the formation of Lake Mead which submerged their confluence under Las Vegas Bay. Due to the lowering of the reservoir over recent years Gypsum Wash is once again a tributary of Las Vegas Wash, now exposed at 36°07′04″N 114°50′54″W at an elevation of 1085 feet. When Las Vegas Bay is at its full level, Gypsum Wash flows into Lower Gypsum Wash Cove at 36°07′43″N 114°51′26″W at an elevation of 1,204 feet (367 meters).

Gypsum Wash has its source in the Dry Lake Range, at 36°20′45″N 114°52′08″W at an elevation of 3,120 feet (950 meters).
