= Black Mountains (Nevada) =

Mountain range in Nevada, United States

- Location within Nevada

Highest point
- Peak: Hamblin Mountain
- Elevation: 3,310 ft (1,010 m)
- Coordinates: 36°10′43″N 114°38′51″W

Geography
- Country: United States
- State: Nevada
- County: Clark
- Range coordinates: 36°12′55.930″N 114°28′31.917″W
- Topo map: USGS Middle Point

The Black Mountains, a mid-Miocene formation, in Nevada are a series of rugged, arid rocky volcanic mountains ranging in elevations to 3310 ft. The range lies on the north shore of Lake Mead, at the southwest corner of the Overton Arm, about 25 mi south of Overton, Nevada.

The Black Mountains are mostly within the Lake Mead National Recreation Area, with a small valley bordering north, the Bitter Spring Valley at the southeast of the arid Muddy Mountains

Deep canyons and washes that flow southeast into the Overton Arm of Lake Mead cut into the mountain range. The range contains deposits of soft manganese oxides/hydroxides.

== History ==
The Armijo Route of the Old Spanish National Historic Trail ran down the Virgin Valley-Overton Arm section of the valleys now occupied by Lake Mead. The trail descended the Colorado from the mouth of the Virgin River, avoided Boulder Canyon, at the southwest of the Black Mountains, where the range is separated from the Black Mountains in Arizona. The trail heading west to Las Vegas Wash, entered the mountains, went southwest of Pyramid Peak to Pinto Valley, and then skirted Hamblin Mountain to the south, with Pinto and Razorback Ridges north; past Cottonwood Spring. North of those ridges lies the small, but broad, arid drainage valley, Bitter Springs Valley, which is southeast of, and adjacent the Muddy Mountains. The trail passes the southern third of the mountain range on the west, making the circuit around Hamblin Mountain and descending Callville Wash. The southwestern end of the Black Mountain range, is now at Callville Bay. At the time of the Old Spanish Trail the trail led to the bottom land valley along the Colorado River below the mouth of Boulder Canyon, that headed towards Las Vegas Wash.

== Access ==
The northwest, and north of the mountains can be accessed by the paved route, North Shore Road, from Nevada State Route 564, Henderson, Nevada, about 30-mi to the south-southwest.

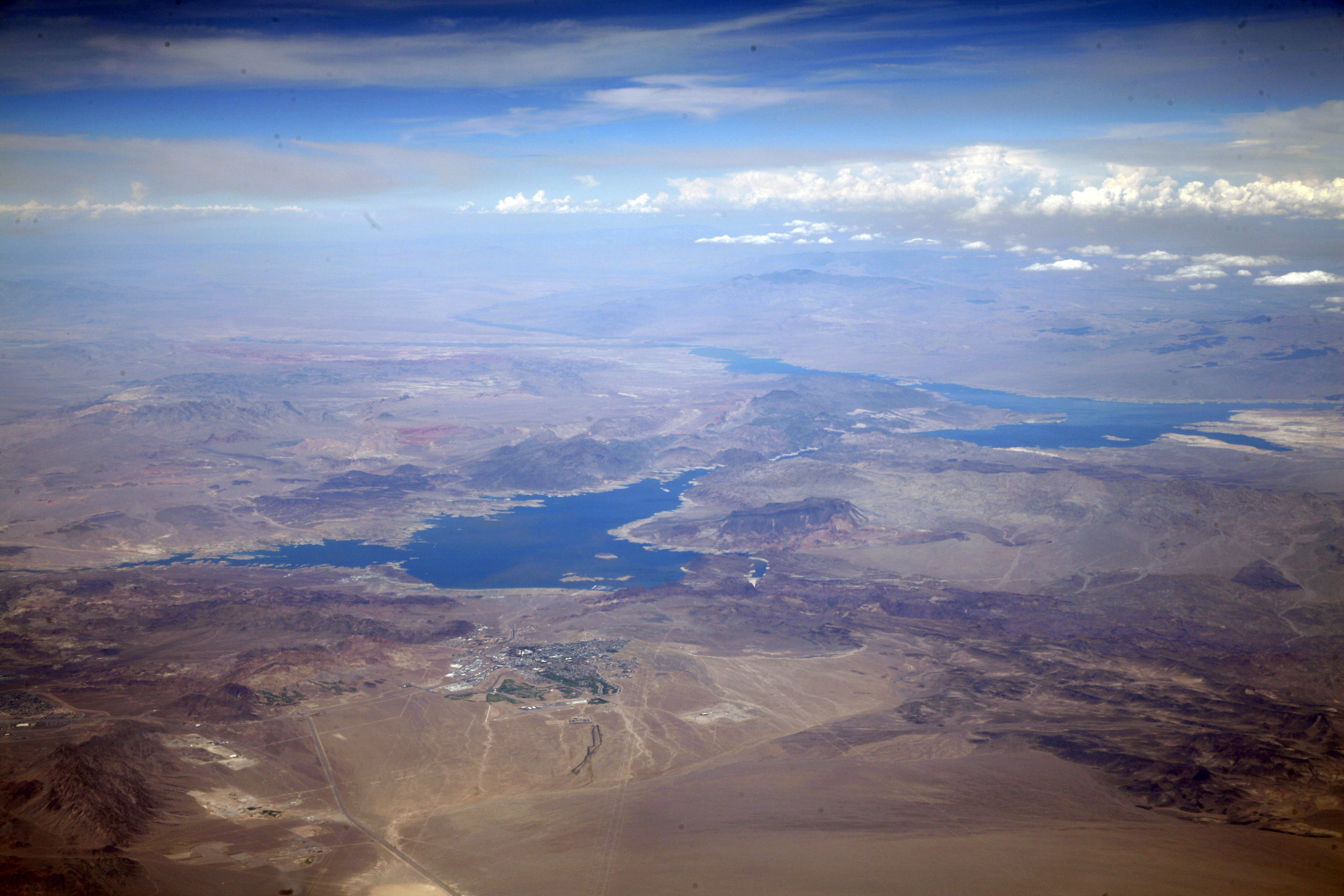
(northeast view)-Three sections-(2-black) of the Black Mountains on the north lake perimeter. The range to the north is the Muddy Mountains, trending north-northeast. Bitter Spring Valley lies between the ranges. (The black range to the lake's southeast, is the Black Mountains (Arizona), north, a tenth of range length, north–south.)
