= Valley of Fire State Park =

State park in Nevada, United States

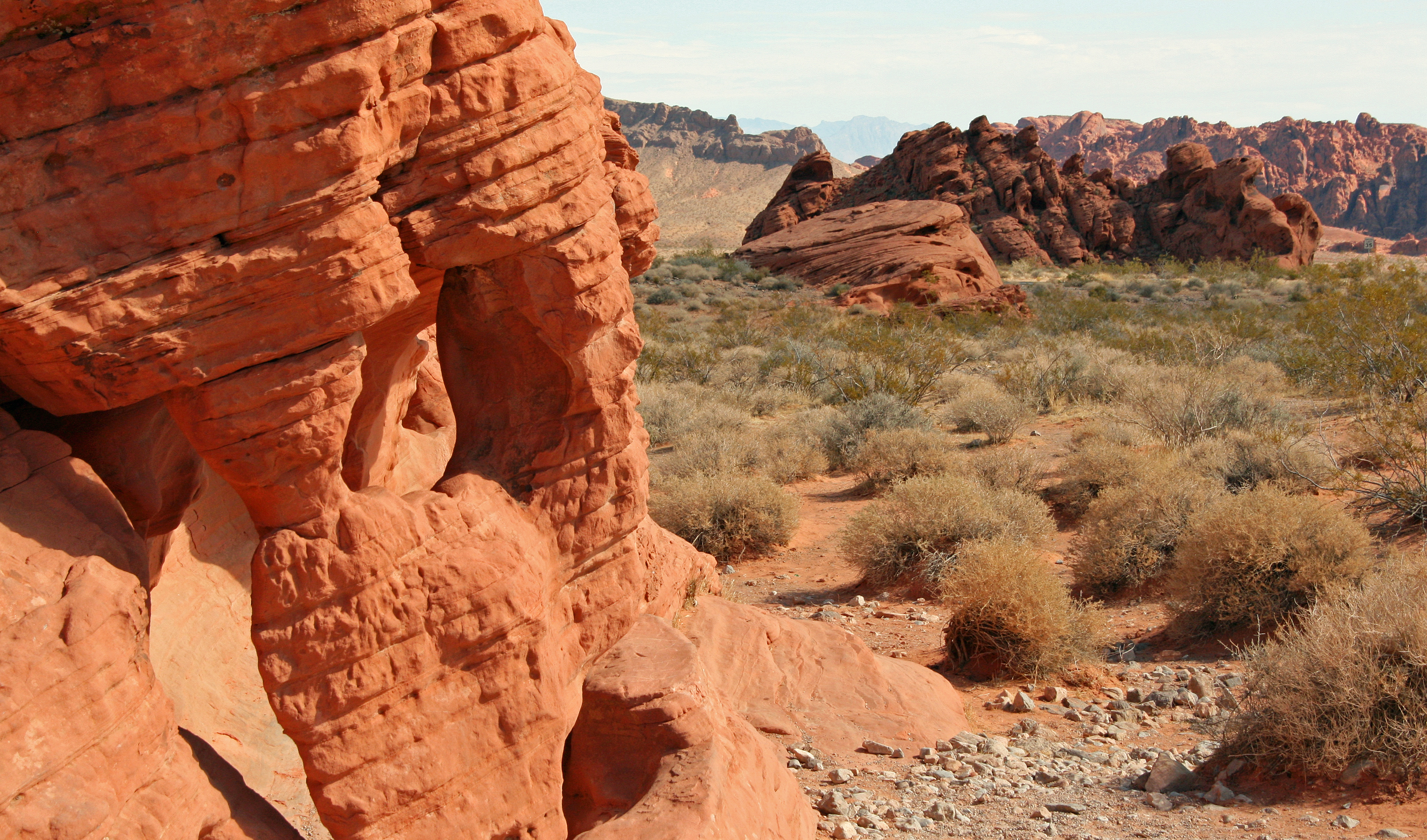

- Location within Nevada
- Location: Clark County, Nevada, United States
- Nearest city: Las Vegas, Nevada
- Coordinates: 36°28′20″N 114°32′15″W
- Area: 45,937.88 acres (18,590.40 ha)
- Elevation: 1,581 ft (482 m)
- Established: 1935
- Administrator: Nevada Division of State Parks
- Visitors: 174,533 vehicles (in 2017)
- Designation: Nevada state park
- Website: Official website

U.S. National Natural Landmark
- Designated: 1968

Nevada Historical Marker
- Reference no.: 150

Valley of Fire State Park is a public recreation and nature preservation area covering nearly 46,000 acres (19,000 ha) located 16 miles (26 km) south of Overton, Nevada. The state park derives its name from red sandstone formations, the Aztec Sandstone, which formed from shifting dunes 150 million years ago. These features, which are the centerpiece of the park's attractions, often appear to be on fire when reflecting the sun's rays. It is Nevada's oldest state park, as commemorated with Nevada Historical Marker #150. It was designated as a National Natural Landmark in 1968.

Valley of Fire is located in the Mojave Desert 50 miles (80 km) northeast of Las Vegas, at an elevation between 1,320–3,009 feet (402–917 m). It abuts the Lake Mead National Recreation Area on the east at the Virgin River confluence. It lies in a 4 by 6 mi (6.4 by 9.7 km) basin.

A new $30 million visitor center was opened November 10, 2025.

== Geology ==
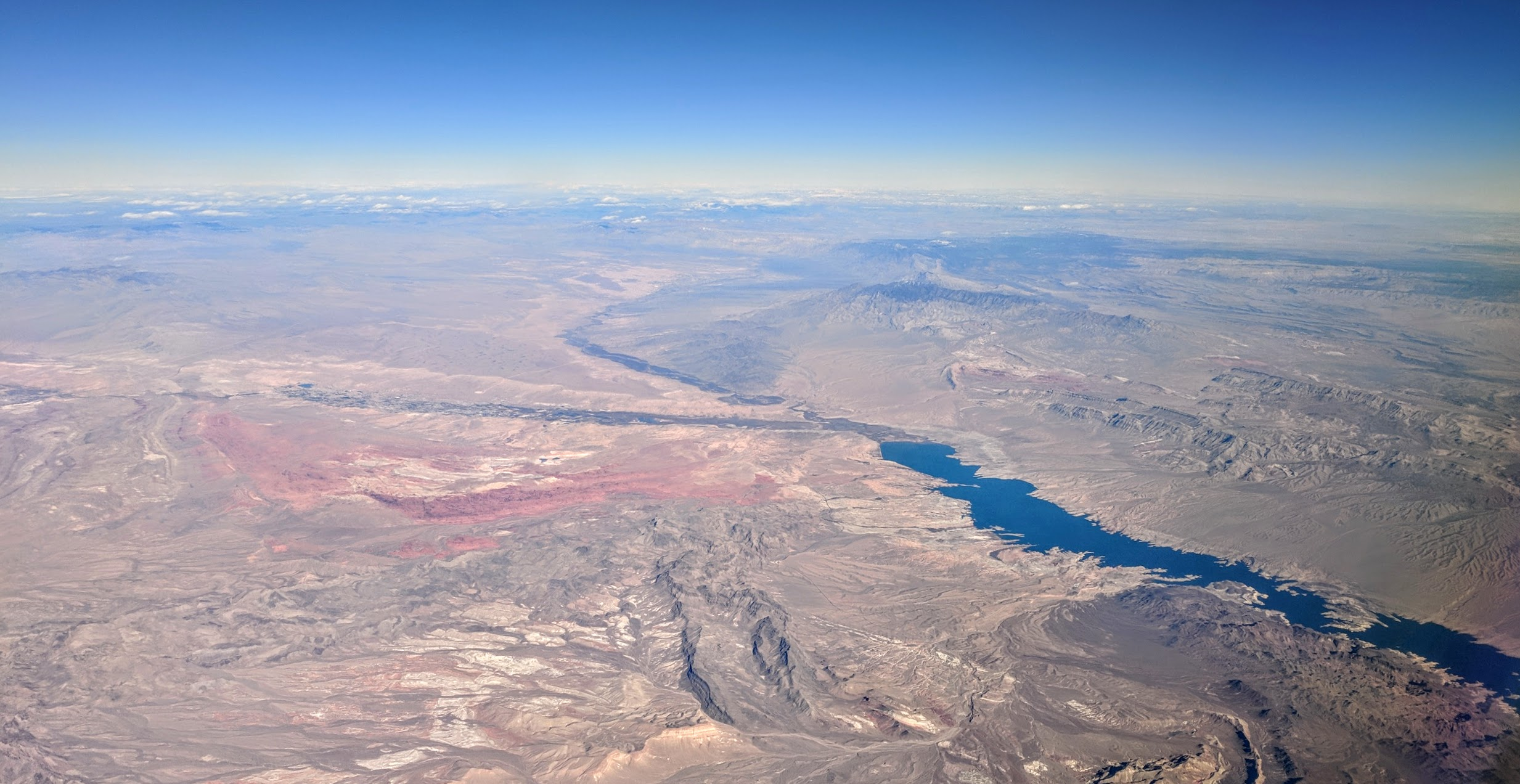
Aerial view of Lake Mead

Complex uplifting and faulting of the region, followed by extensive erosion, have created the landscape. The rough floor and jagged walls of the park contain brilliant formations of eroded sandstone and sand dunes more than 150 million years old. Other important rock formations include limestones, shales, and conglomerates.

== History ==
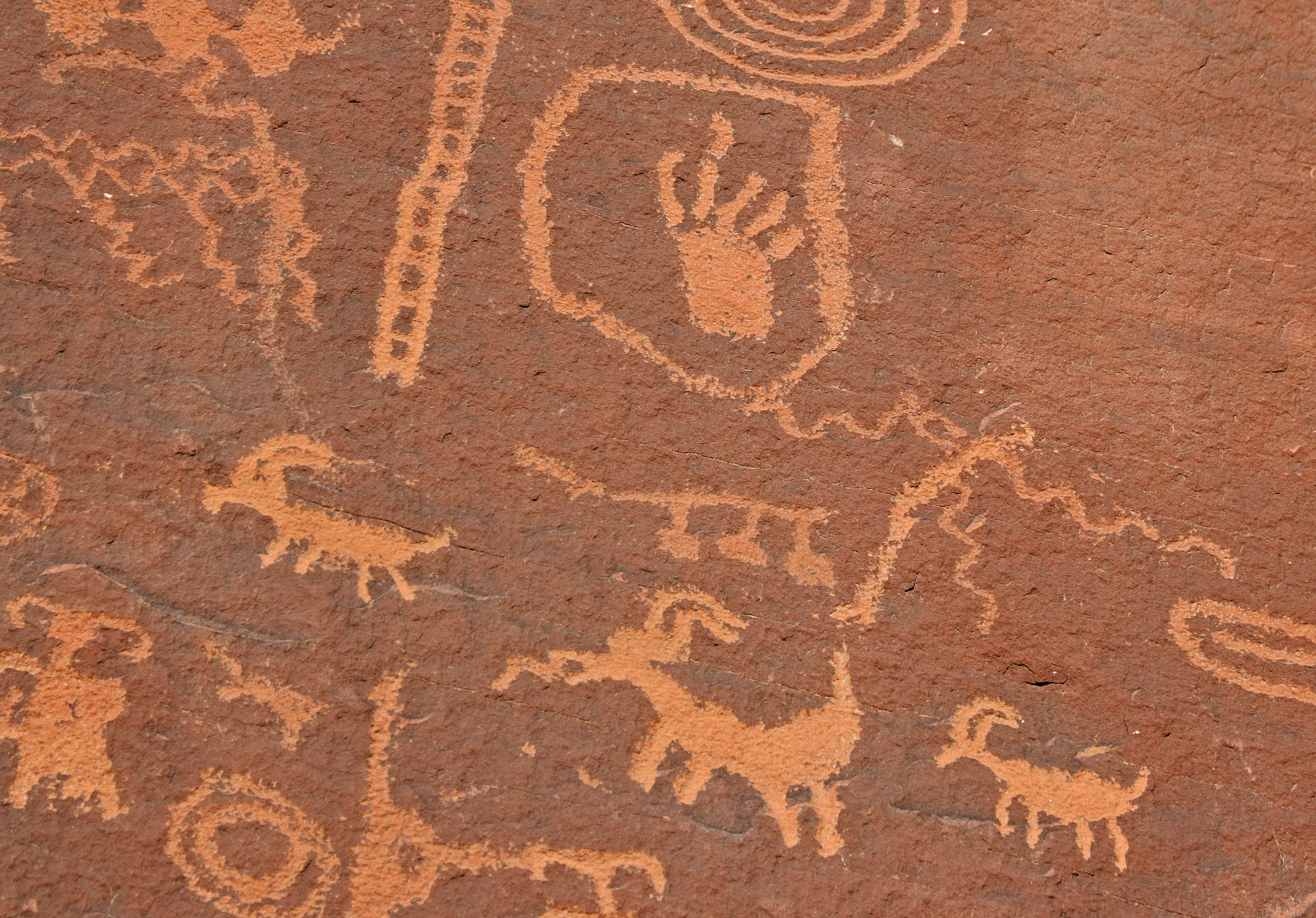
Petroglyphs

Prehistoric inhabitants of the Valley of Fire included the Ancestral Puebloans, also known as the Anasazi, who were farmers from the nearby fertile Moapa Valley. Their approximate occupation span has been dated from 300 BC to 1150 AD. Their visits probably involved hunting, food gathering, and religious ceremonies, although scarcity of water would have limited their stay. Fine examples of rock art (petroglyphs) left by these ancient peoples can be found at several sites within the park.

The creation of Valley of Fire State Park began with the transfer of 8,760 acres (3,550 ha) of federal land to the state of Nevada in 1931. Work on the park was initiated by the Civilian Conservation Corps in 1933. During their employment, which continued into the early 1940s, CCC workers built campgrounds, trails, stone visitor cabins, ramadas, and roads. The park opened in 1934; it achieved official designation by the state legislature in 1935.

== Climate ==
The Valley of Fire State Park has a dry and warm climate typical of the Mojave Desert in which it lies. Winters are mild with daytime temperatures ranging from 54 to 75 °F (12 to 24 °C). and over night lows in the mid 30 °F's to low 50 °F's (3-12 °C). Storms moving east from the Pacific Ocean occasionally bring rain during the winter months. Daily summer highs usually range from 100 to 115 °F (38 to 46 °C) and on occasion may reach near 120 °F (49 °C). Thunderstorms from the Southwestern Monsoon can produce heavy showers during summer. The average annual precipitation is 6.50 in (165 mm).

Climate data for Valley of Fire State Park, Nevada (1991–2020 normals, extremes 1972–present)
Month	Jan	Feb	Mar	Apr	May	Jun	Jul	Aug	Sep	Oct	Nov	Dec	Year
Record high °F (°C)	75 (24)	87 (31)	96 (36)	100 (38)	111 (44)	118 (48)	120 (49)	116 (47)	114 (46)	102 (39)	87 (31)	80 (27)	120 (49)
Mean daily maximum °F (°C)	58.2 (14.6)	62.7 (17.1)	70.9 (21.6)	79.1 (26.2)	89.2 (31.8)	100.2 (37.9)	105.3 (40.7)	103.6 (39.8)	96.4 (35.8)	82.5 (28.1)	68.0 (20.0)	57.0 (13.9)	81.1 (27.3)
Daily mean °F (°C)	49.2 (9.6)	53.2 (11.8)	60.3 (15.7)	67.5 (19.7)	77.2 (25.1)	87.9 (31.1)	93.7 (34.3)	92.0 (33.3)	84.4 (29.1)	71.2 (21.8)	57.9 (14.4)	48.1 (8.9)	70.2 (21.2)
Mean daily minimum °F (°C)	40.1 (4.5)	43.7 (6.5)	49.8 (9.9)	55.9 (13.3)	65.2 (18.4)	75.7 (24.3)	82.1 (27.8)	80.3 (26.8)	72.5 (22.5)	60.0 (15.6)	47.7 (8.7)	39.3 (4.1)	59.4 (15.2)
Record low °F (°C)	19 (−7)	18 (−8)	29 (−2)	29 (−2)	42 (6)	48 (9)	64 (18)	61 (16)	49 (9)	38 (3)	28 (−2)	12 (−11)	12 (−11)
Average precipitation inches (mm)	0.78 (20)	1.12 (28)	0.76 (19)	0.31 (7.9)	0.18 (4.6)	0.06 (1.5)	0.68 (17)	0.37 (9.4)	0.28 (7.1)	0.42 (11)	0.52 (13)	0.81 (21)	6.29 (160)
Average snowfall inches (cm)	0.0 (0.0)	0.0 (0.0)	0.0 (0.0)	0.0 (0.0)	0.0 (0.0)	0.0 (0.0)	0.0 (0.0)	0.0 (0.0)	0.0 (0.0)	0.0 (0.0)	0.0 (0.0)	0.3 (0.76)	0.3 (0.76)
Average precipitation days (≥ 0.01 in)	3.5	4.2	3.7	1.9	1.1	0.6	2.1	2.1	1.6	2.2	2.0	3.5	28.5
Average snowy days (≥ 0.1 in)	0.0	0.1	0.0	0.0	0.0	0.0	0.0	0.0	0.0	0.0	0.1	0.1	0.3
Source: NOAA

== Valley of Fire Road ==
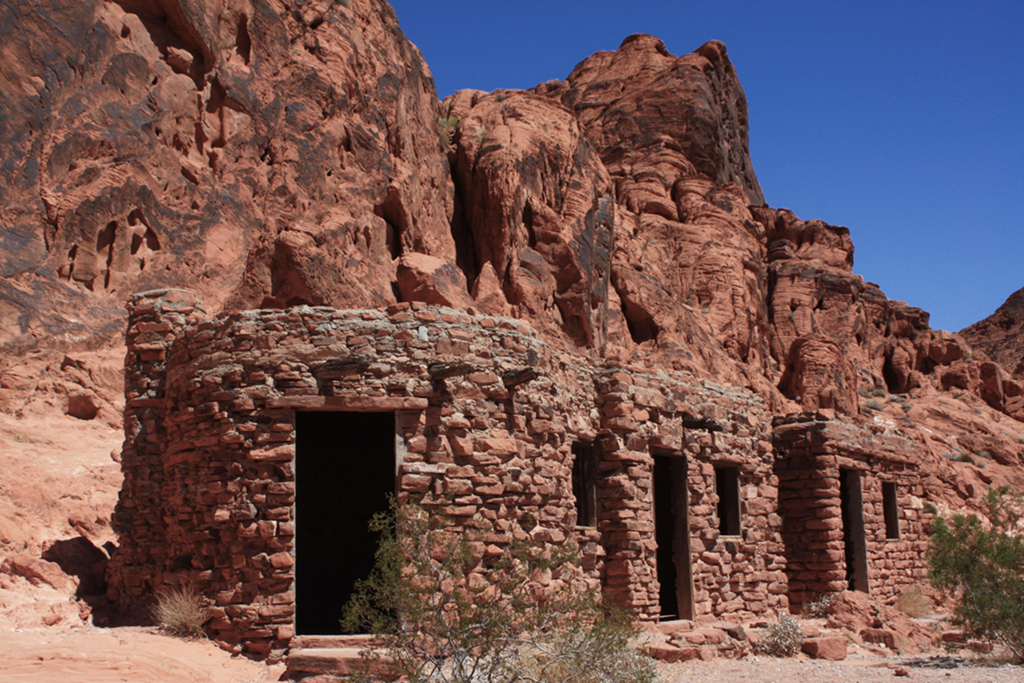
Civilian Conservation Corps cabins

Valley of Fire Road is the main road accessing and traversing through the park. The 10.5-mile (16.9 km) section of the route between the east and west entrances of the park was officially designated as a Nevada Scenic Byway on June 30, 1995.

== Activities and amenities ==
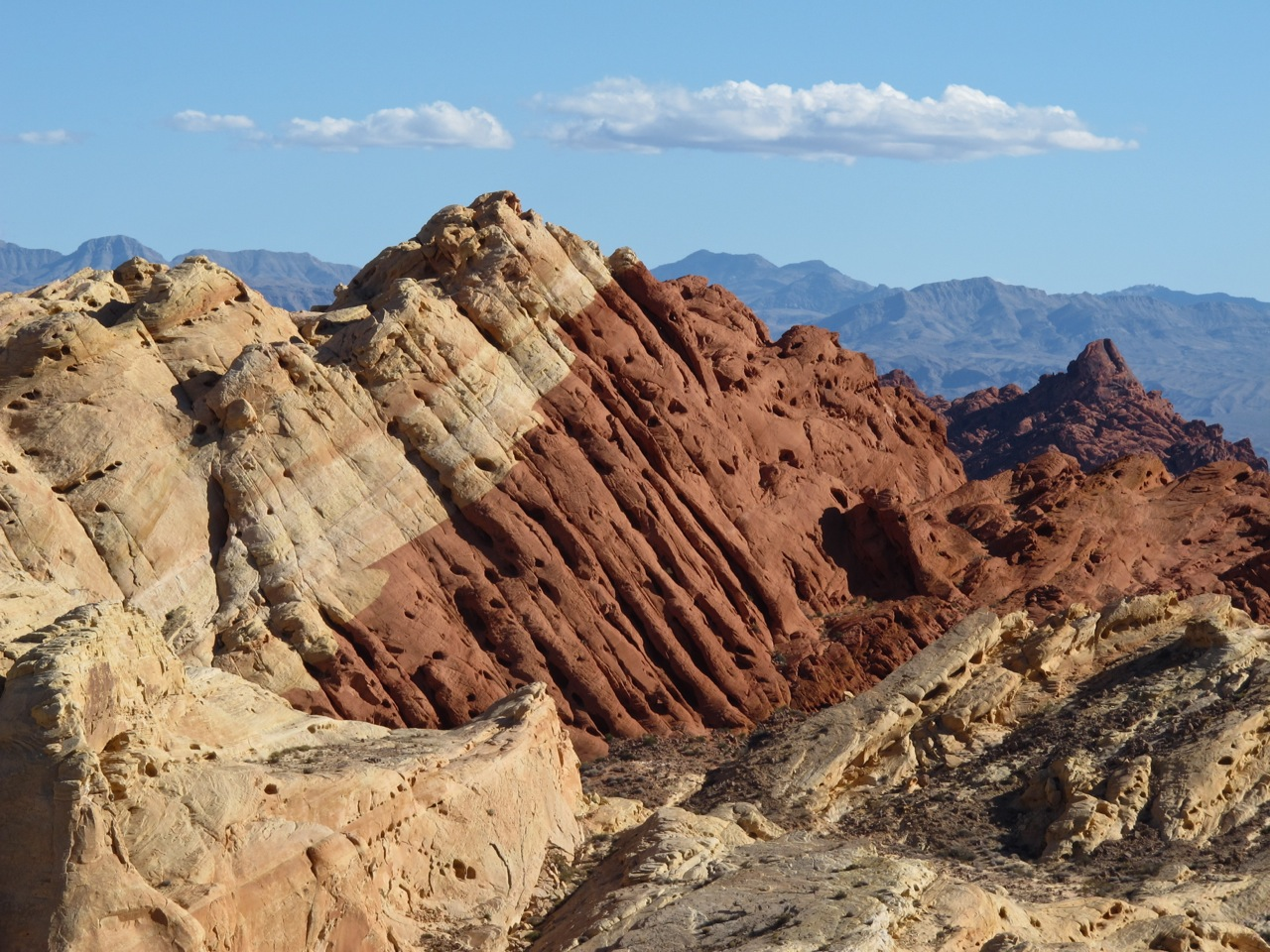
Striking rock formations within the Valley of Fire.

The park has a visitor center plus facilities for picnicking, camping, and hiking. Petroglyphs are seen throughout the park, with Mouse's Tank and Atlatl Rock two areas in particular with numerous petroglyphs that are relatively easily accessible. The park also preserves three stone cabins built by the Civilian Conservation Corps.

== Film history ==
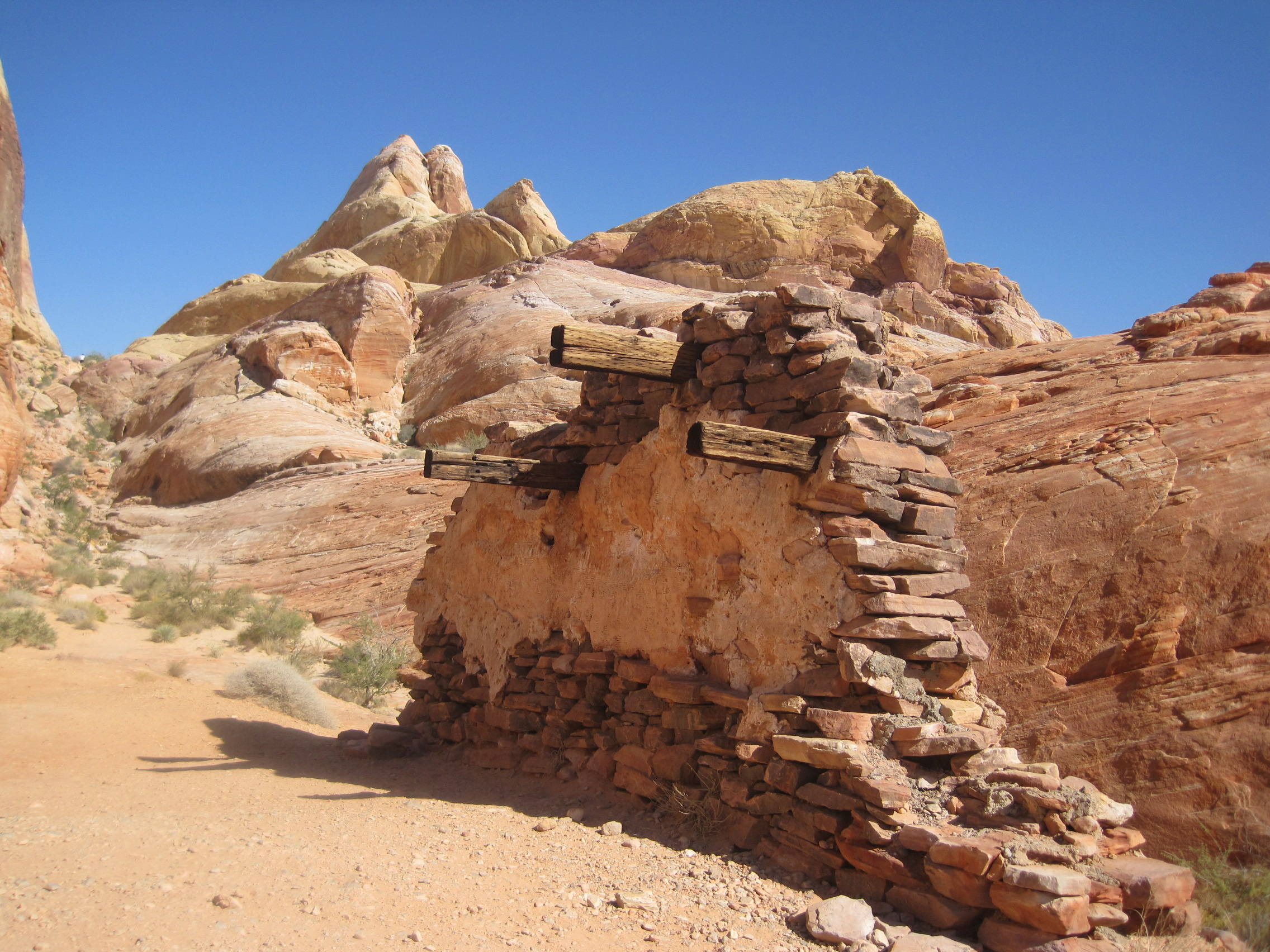
Ruin along the White Domes trail from the movie The Professionals

Valley of Fire is a popular location for shooting automobile commercials and other commercial photography. It has provided a setting for the following films and television shows:

- Viva Las Vegas starring Elvis Presley had multiple shots filmed in the park during the racing scenes for the film's finale in 1963.
- The Professionals with Burt Lancaster, Jack Palance, Lee Marvin, and Claudia Cardinale was filmed in 1966. Valley of Fire was one of three locations used in the film. All that remains of the set is a portion of a rock wall of a hacienda.
- The outside Mars scenes from Total Recall, starring Arnold Schwarzenegger, were almost totally shot in Valley of Fire.
- The scenes from planet Veridian III from Star Trek Generations were filmed here in 1994. The Silica Dome is particularly highlighted for Star Trek fans as the site of iconic starship captain James T. Kirk's death and burial.

== Law enforcement incidents ==
On July 10, 2024, a park ranger shot and killed a man who allegedly charged at the ranger with a knife, which resulted in the park being closed for two days. An investigation later conducted by the Department of Public Safety said suicide notes were found; the suspect had knife wounds on his neck; blood was found inside the suspect's vehicle and on the knife, which indicated the wounds were likely self-inflicted, and occurred before he got out of his car.

== See also ==
- Media related to Valley of Fire State Park at Wikimedia Commons (image gallery)
- Red Rock Canyon National Conservation Area
- Little Finland and Gold Butte Backcountry Byway
- Moapa River Indian Reservation
