= Pinto Valley (Nevada) =

Basin in the Black Mountains of Clark County, Nevada

Coordinates: 36°12′12″N 114°34′56″W

Pinto Valley is a basin in the Black Mountains of Clark County, Nevada. It lies at an elevation of 1,759 feet (536 meters).

== Wilderness ==
Established in 2002 by the U.S. Congress, the Pinto Valley Wilderness protects the valleys and hills in this northern shore section of Lake Mead National Recreation Area. The 39,173 acre desert wilderness area includes Guardian Peak and is managed by the National Park Service. It is bordered by the Jimbilnan Wilderness to the east.
