= Muddy Mountains =

Mountain range in southern Nevada, US

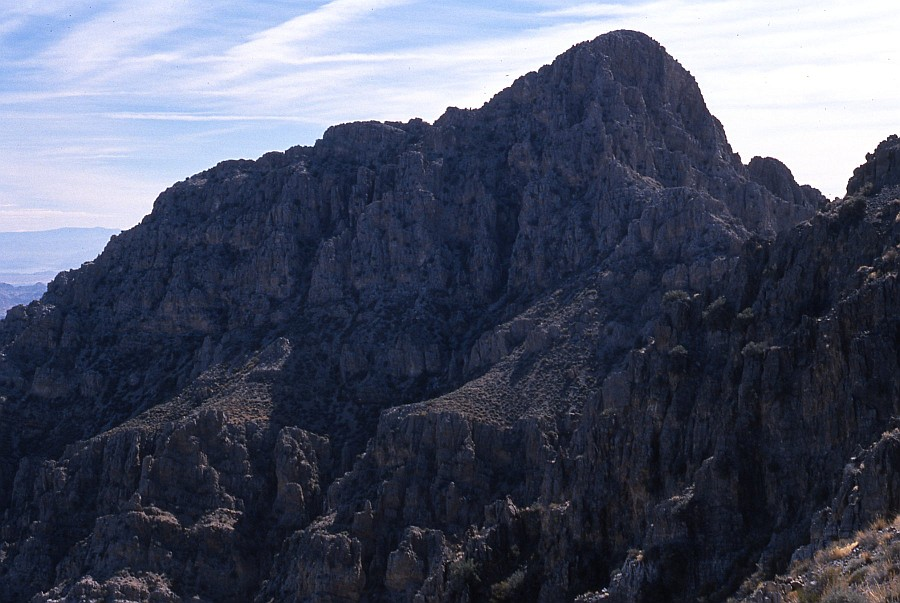
- Muddy Peak, second highest summit of the Muddy Mountains

Highest point
- Peak: Muddy Summit
- Elevation: 1,657 m (5,436 ft)
- Coordinates: 36°17′55″N 114°42′51″W

Geography
- Location within Nevada
- Country: United States
- State: Nevada
- District: Clark County
- Range coordinates: 36°23′33.908″N 114°39′0.960″W
- Topo map: USGS Piute Point

The Muddy Mountains are a large mountain range in Clark County, Nevada.

The Muddy Mountains surround a north section of Bitter Spring Valley, which also lies at the northwest perimeter of the Black Mountains, lying on a north shore of an east-west section of Lake Mead.

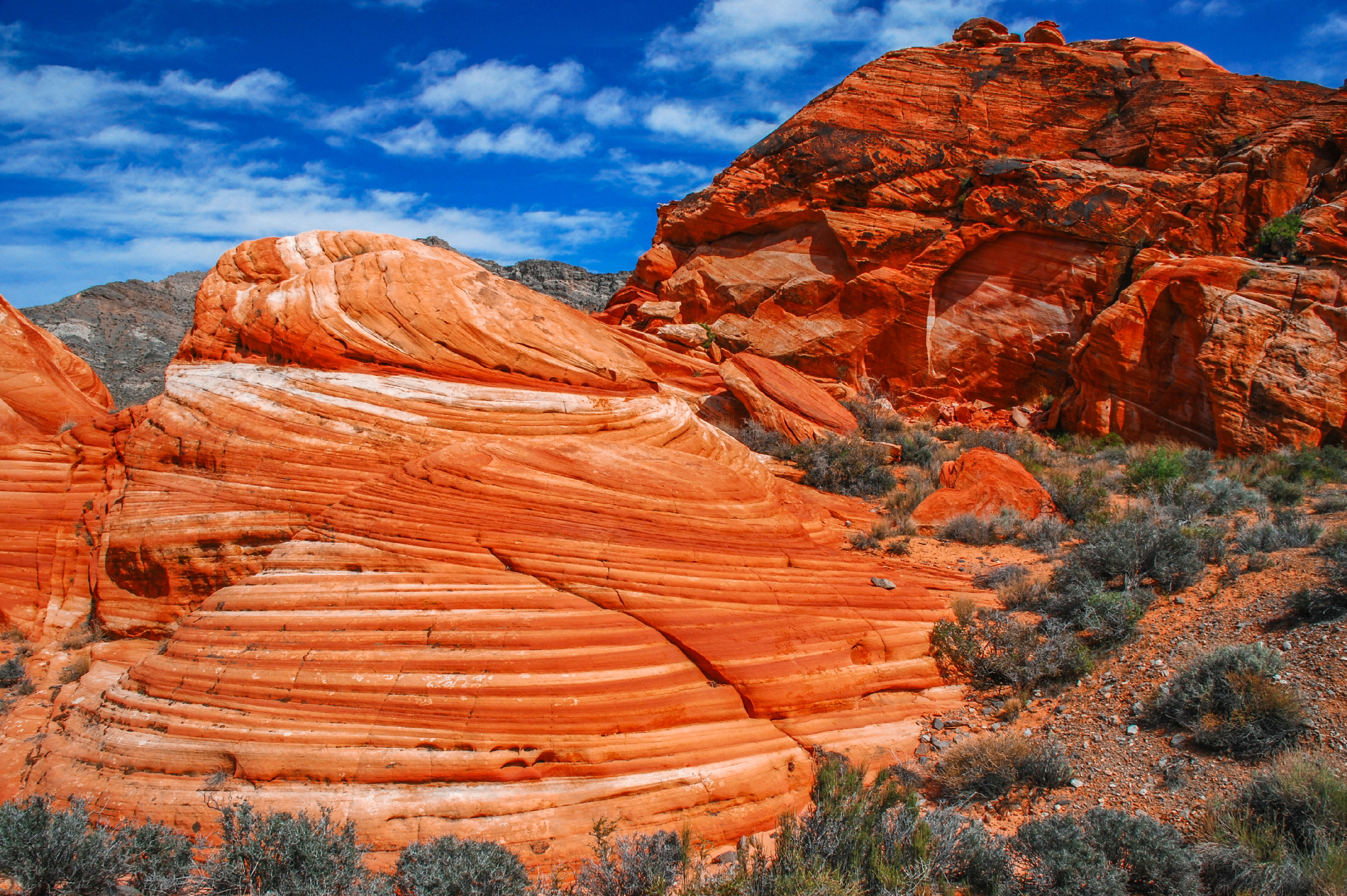
Cross bedding in Aztec Sandstone, Muddy Mountains Wilderness Area

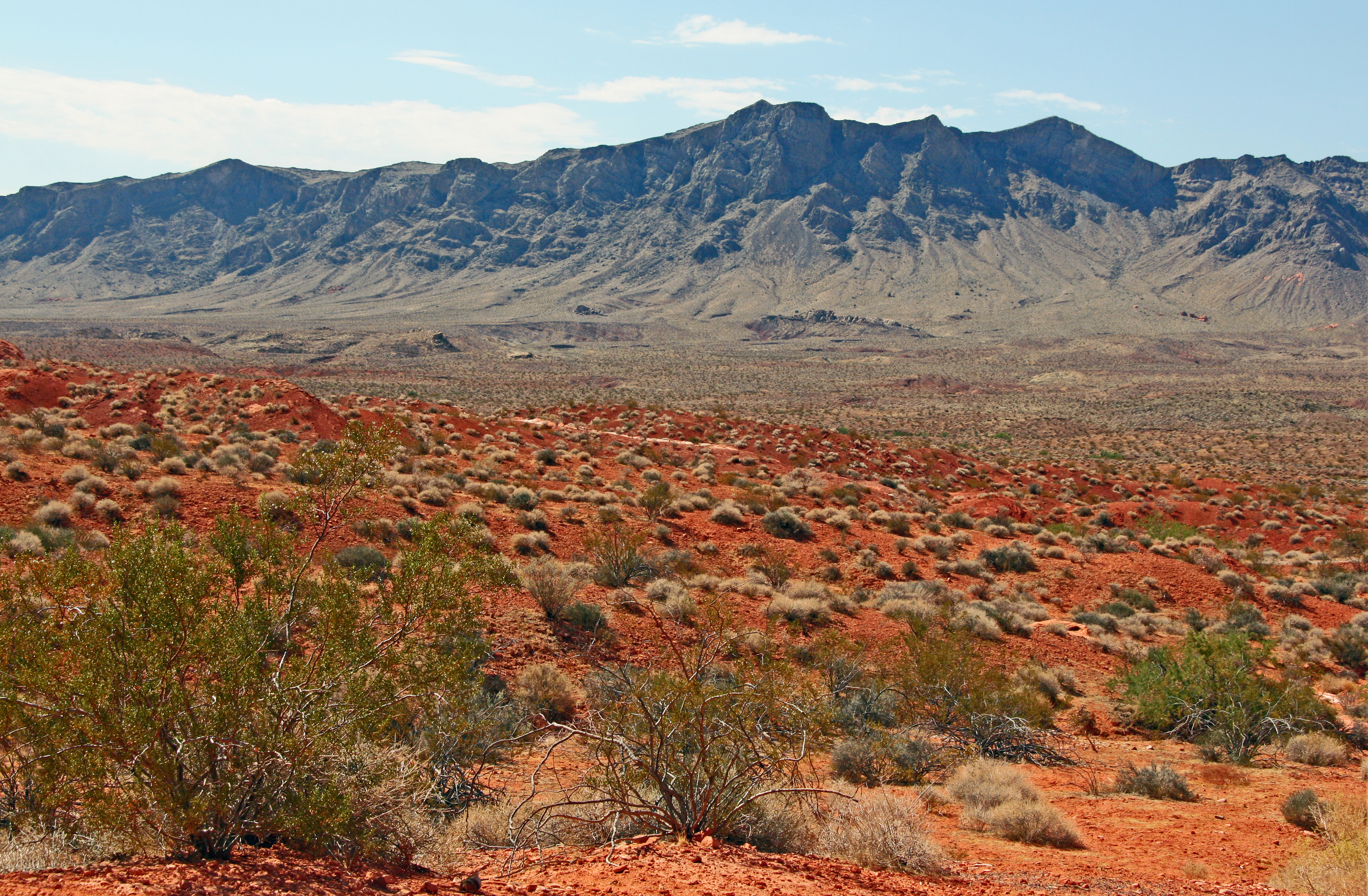
Muddy Mountains seen from the Valley of Fire State Park, Nevada

The Muddy Mountains Wilderness consists of 48,154 acres and was established by the U.S. Congress in 2002. The wilderness area is managed by the U.S. Bureau of Land Management and the National Park Service. Elevations in the area range from 1,700 feet (518 m) to 5,400 feet (1645 m).
