= Aztec Sandstone =

Early Jurassic geological formation in the Mojave Desert, United States

- Stratigraphic range: Early Jurassic
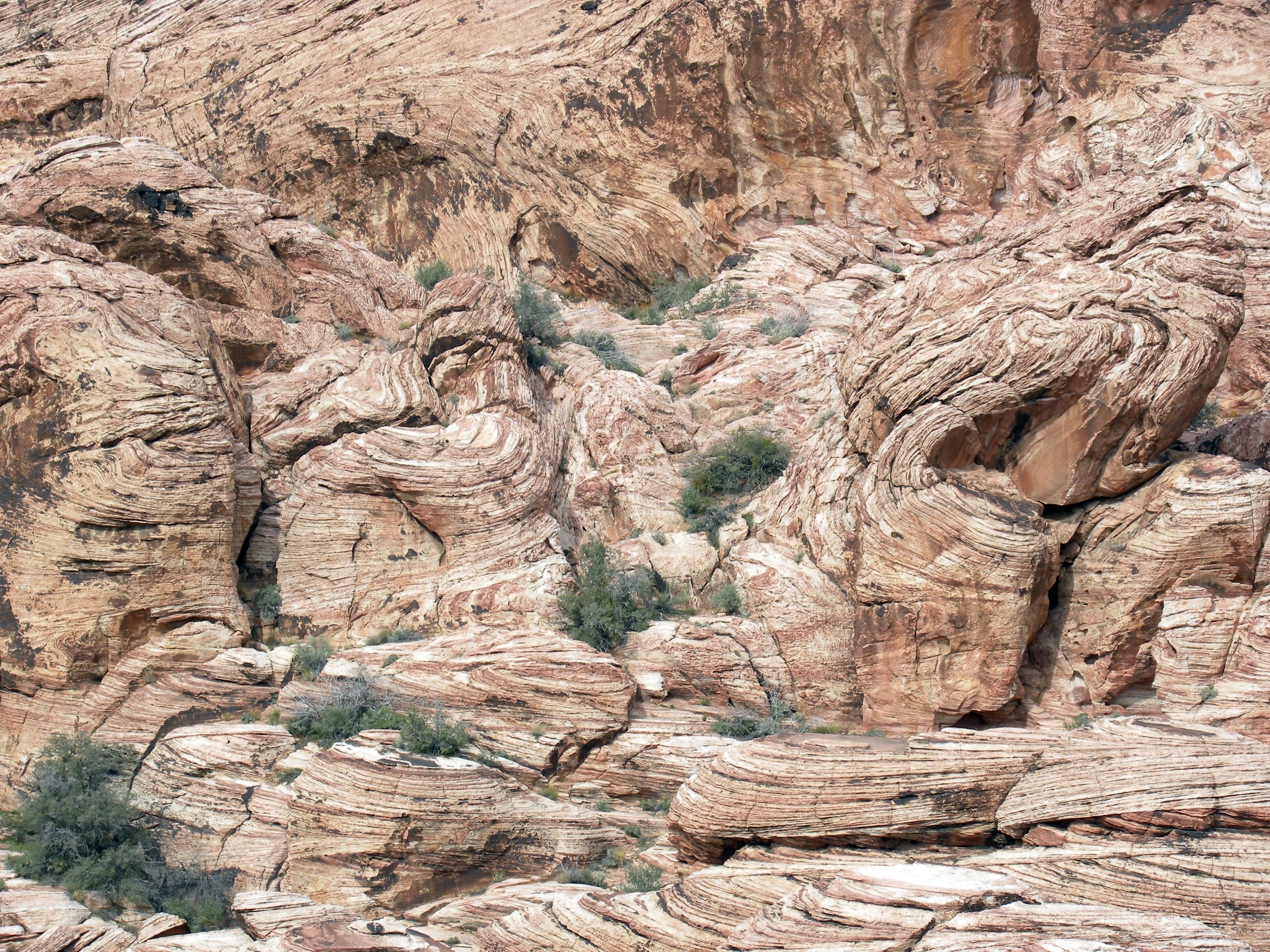
- Outcrop of the Aztec Sandstone at Red Rock Canyon National Conservation Area near Las Vegas, Nevada
- Type: Sedimentary
- Underlies: Willow Tank Formation
- Overlies: Chinle Formation
- Area: Nevada, Arizona, California
- Thickness: 2,100 ft (640 m) in Goodsprings quadrangle 2,500 ft (760 m) in Muddy Mountain area

Lithology
- Primary: sandstone
- Other: arenite, sand

Location
- Coordinates: 35.4°N 115.5°W
- Approximate paleocoordinates: 20.8°N 53.4°W
- Region: Mojave Desert
- Country: United States

Type section
- Named by: D. F. Hewett
- Year defined: 1931
- Aztec Sandstone (the United States) Aztec Sandstone (California)

The Aztec Sandstone is an Early Jurassic geological formation of primarily eolian sand from which fossil pterosaur tracks have been recovered. The formation is exposed in the Mojave Desert of Arizona, California and Nevada. Aztec Sandstone is named after the Aztec Tank, a lake in the Spring Mountain region of Nevada.

== Description ==
The Aztec Sandstone is made up of two units. The lower resistant sandstone unit (100 metres (330 ft) thick) is tan to off-white in outcrops but pinkish in fresh exposures. Cross-bedded lenses can easily be observed. Frosted and pitted quartz grains well-cemented by silica are described by Evans in 1958 and 1971. The upper and less resistant unit (200m thick) consists of alternating white quartz arenites and red to brown silty sands.

== Vertebrate paleofauna ==
The formation has provided the following ichnofossils attributed to vertebrates:

Color key: Taxon / Reclassified taxon / Taxon falsely reported as present / Dubious taxon or junior synonym / Ichnotaxon / Ootaxon / Morphotaxon	Notes; Uncertain or tentative taxa are in small text; ~~crossed out~~ taxa are discredited.

Ichnofossils of the Aztec Sandstone
Genus	Species	Location	Member	Abundance	Notes	Images
Anchisauripus					Reclassified as Grallator	
Brasilichnium						
Grallator						
Navahopus						
Octopodichnus						
Pteraichnus						
Skolithos						

== See also ==
- List of fossil sites
- List of fossiliferous stratigraphic units in California
- List of fossiliferous stratigraphic units in Nevada
