= Boulder Basin =

Landform in the Lake Mead Reservoir

Coordinates: 36°05′00″N 114°45′04″W

Boulder Basin is the westernmost of the three basins occupied by the Lake Mead reservoir and lies within the boundaries of Clark County, Nevada and Mohave County, Arizona. It includes the area between Hoover Dam and the mouth of Boulder Canyon at Auxiliary Point. When the reservoir is full it reaches an elevation of 1,204 feet (367 meters). It includes Las Vegas Bay, Swallow Bay, Callville Bay and Hamblin Bay.
