= Clark County Wetlands Park =

Park in Las Vegas, Nevada

Coordinates: 36.101088°N 115.023158°W

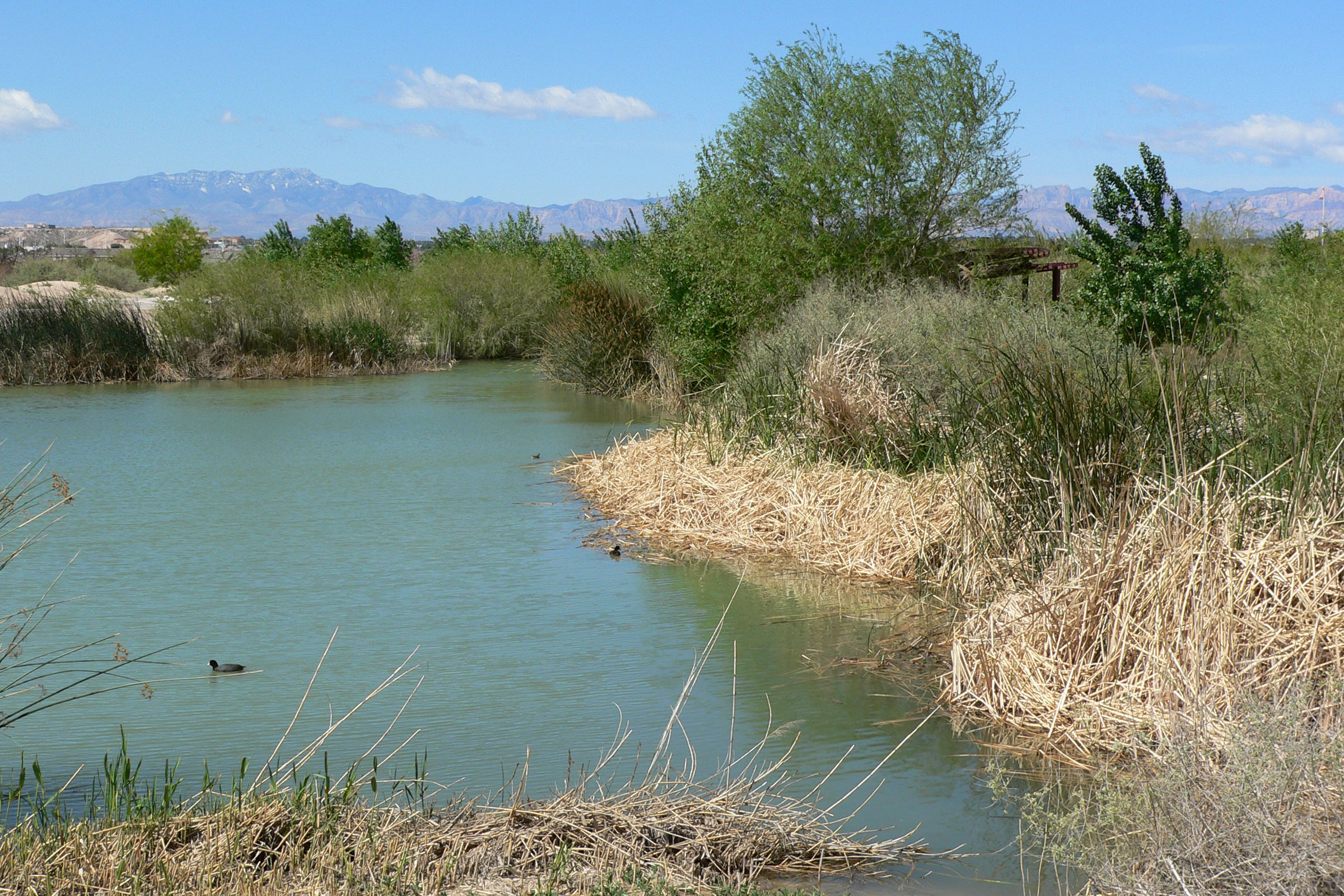
In the wetlands, looking west

The Clark County Wetlands Park is the largest park in the Clark County, Nevada park system. The park is on the east side of the Las Vegas valley and runs from the various water treatment plants near the natural beginning of the Las Vegas Wash to where the wash flows under Lake Las Vegas and later into Lake Mead.

One purpose of the park is to reduce the environmental impact of the waste water and stormwater runoff leaving the drainage basin area, by building a constructed wetland. This is being accomplished by installing a series of water flow control structures such as dams and weirs and by creating ponds that together slow down the flow of the water, catching silt, and reducing the undercutting of the dirt walls that form the wash. As of June, 2005 nine of these structures were operational.

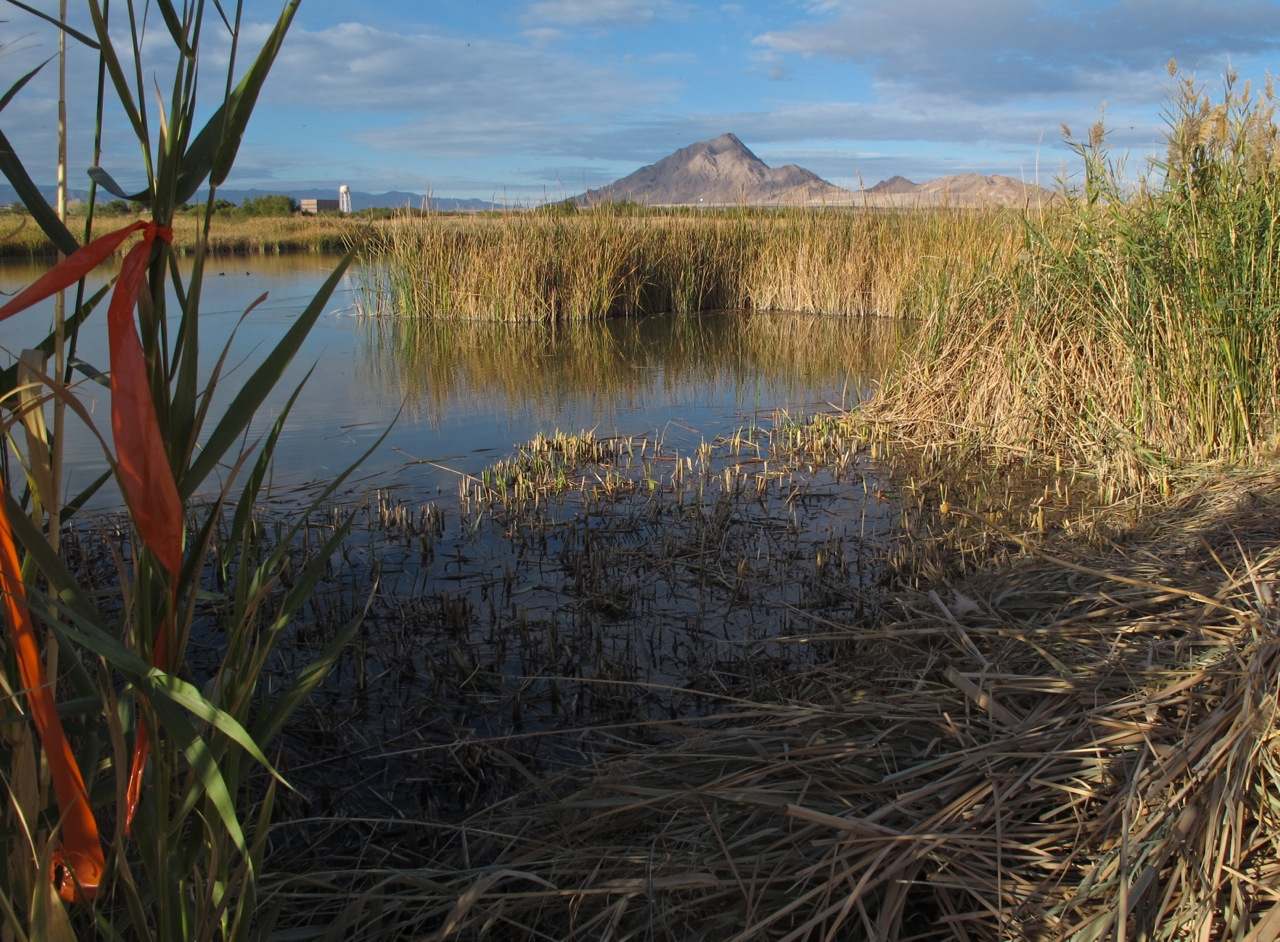
The Clark County Wetlands with Frenchman Mountain in the background.

The sides of the wash are being stabilized by installing native plants and large pieces of demolished construction debris. Some of the native plants, especially those in areas of standing water, also help purify the water by removing various pollutants as the slow moving water provides these plants with nourishment. This method of purification is also called natural water polishing.

The second purpose of the park is education. The displays within the park show visitors how the wash looked before major settlement occurred in the valley and the impact people have had on the environment.

The park has a nature center with displays about the park's plants and animals. There are miles of walking paths.

== Species impact ==
While the end result of the changes in the park should be to improve the habitat for several threatened or endangered species, their presence, even if only for limited periods during the year, has slowed the improvements. Their presence requires projects demonstrate that they will not endanger the existing sites used by these species.
