= Auxiliary Point =

Cape in Lake Mead, Clark County, Nevada

Coordinates: 36°08′15.3″N 114°38′59″W

- Location within Nevada
- Location: Lake Mead reservoir

Auxiliary Point is a cape in the Lake Mead reservoir in Clark County, Nevada. Auxiliary Point marks the mouth of Boulder Canyon, a canyon on the Colorado River, above Hoover Dam, now flooded by Lake Mead.
