= Swallow Bay =

Bay in Boulder Basin, Lake Mead, Clark County, Nevada

Coordinates: 36.120°N 114.743°W

Swallow Bay is a bay within Boulder Basin in Lake Mead in Clark County, Nevada.
