= Flow splitter =

A flow splitter, additionally referred to as a flow divider, is a device in hydraulic engineering designed to break up the flow of water or nappe over a dam wall or weir. This flow can be broken up into differing ratios, which varies depending on the type of flow splitter. Flow splitters are used to reduce the likelihood of nappe vibration that might cause the failure of a dam wall by aerating the water flow. They are also used to restrict large flows of stormwater, in situations where a stormwater management device is designed only to treat small storms.

Another use for a flow splitter is to again break up the nappe so as to allow fish, such as salmon to swim upstream and over small weirs.

Split flow weirs are also used in drinking water and wastewater treatment plants (sewage treatment or industrial wastewater treatment) to proportion flows to different outlets in a junction box.

== Types of Flow Splitters ==
Flow splitters are known in various forms including, but not limited to:

- Rotary / Gear type
- Spool type
- Motor type

Spool type dividers allow for the input flow to be split into countless ratios through two outputs. This divider allows upkeep on its continuous flow through the freedom of movement within the housing, even against changes in loads and pressures. The flow of liquid through spool type splitters start at the center and flow out towards the two outputs. An obstruction in either section of the two in this splitter results in the entirety of the component to be impeded.

Motor type flow splitters change the ratios in flow based on the number of hydraulic motors that are connected to the main feed. The use of two hydraulic motors can form a 50/50 split in flow, with additional motors allowing for versatility in the ratio. Displacement is a factor in the adjustment of these ratios. With two hydraulic motors, one having a displacement that equals three times the second, results in a 75%/25% split in the flow.

The gear type splitter creates two or more flow paths through its use of mating gears located within the housing. With the input flow traveling through housing, the liquid flows through the component and splits as the interlinked gears move with the liquid acting against them. All of the gears move at the same speed since they are connected. This allows for an even flow of the liquid. The output flow behaves corresponding to the input flow. If the input flow is adjusted, this will affect the output flow. Similarly to the spool type splitter, having one output obstructed means the other outputs are also affected.

Performance can be hindered in the same way as other hydraulic components, one being air that is trapped.

Flow splitters are often manufactured with the consideration of varying uses in mind. This change in performance is created through the making of splitters varying in flow, accuracy and pressure.

== See also ==
- Flow control structure
