= Hamblin Bay =

Bay in of Lake Mead, Clark County, Nevada

Coordinates: 36°8′26″N 114°39′13″W

Hamblin Bay is a bay of Lake Mead on the Colorado River, to the east of Las Vegas and Callville Bay in the U.S. state of Nevada. It lies between Sandy Cove which lies to the west and Rotary Cove and Rufus Cove which lie to the east. Hamblin Bay is also a fault of the same name in the vicinity, which "strikes at a low angle to the easternmost mapped branch of the Las Vegas Shear Zone".

== Name ==
It is named after Mormon missionary William Haynes Hamblin.
