= Las Vegas Wash =

Channel draining into Lake Mead

Coordinates: 36°07′56″N 114°52′44″W

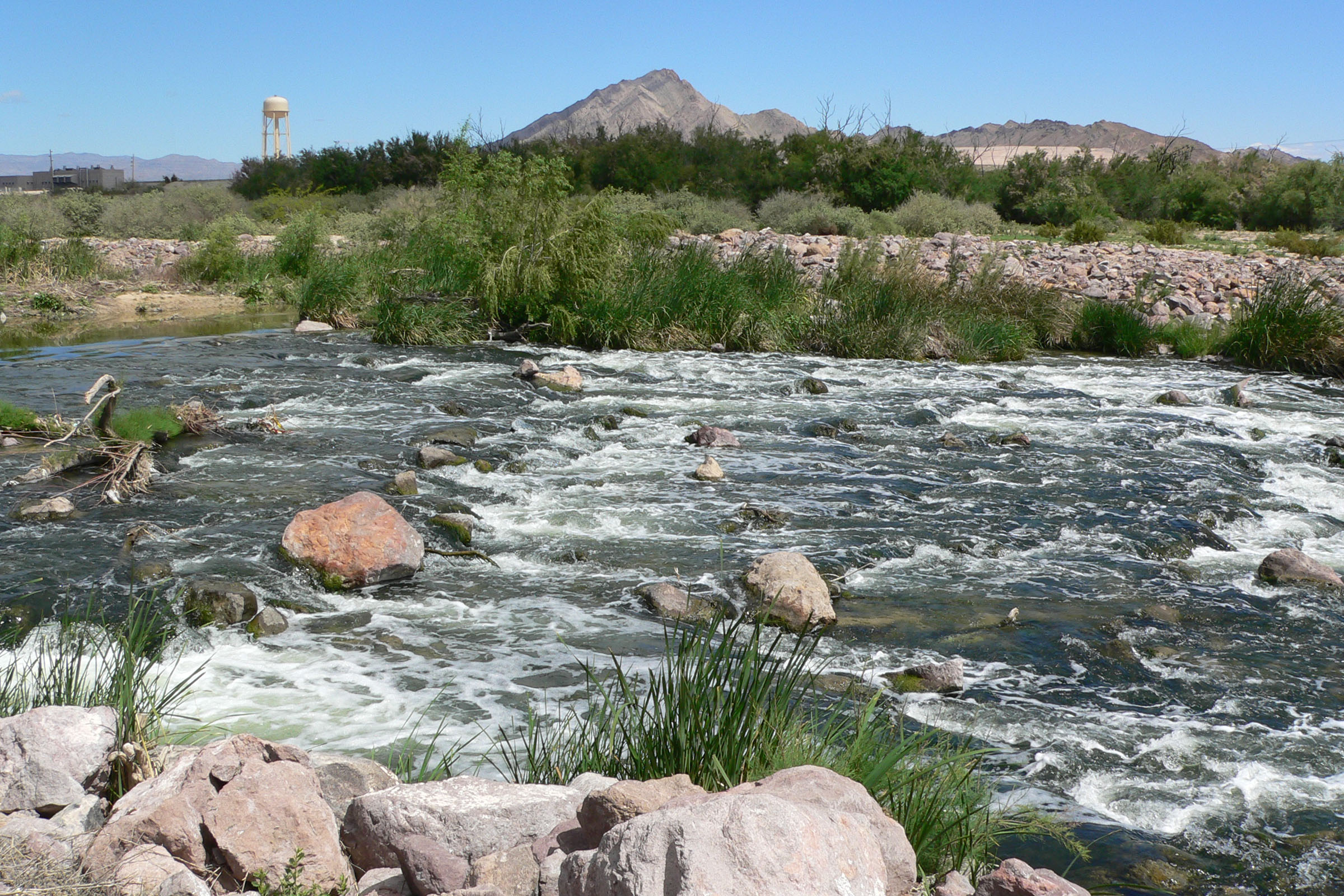
- Heavy flow in spring 2005, with Frenchman Mountain in the background

Location
- Country: United States
- State: Nevada
- Region: Las Vegas Valley

Physical characteristics
- Source: Lake Mead
- Mouth: Las Vegas Bay
- Length: 12 mi (19 km)

Las Vegas Wash is a 12-mile-long stream (an "arroyo" or "wash") which feeds most of the Las Vegas Valley's excess water into Lake Mead. The wash is sometimes called an urban river, and it exists in its present capacity because of an urban population. The wash also works in a systemic conjunction with the pre-existing wetlands that formed the oasis of the Las Vegas Valley. The wash is fed by urban runoff, shallow ground water, reclaimed water used on parks and golf courses, and stormwater.

The wetlands of the Las Vegas Valley act as the kidneys of the environment, cleaning the water that runs through it. The wetlands filter out harmful residues from fertilizers, oils, and other contaminants that can be found on the roadways and in the surrounding desert.

Near its terminus at Las Vegas Bay, the wash passes under the man made Lake Las Vegas through two 7-foot pipes.

== History ==
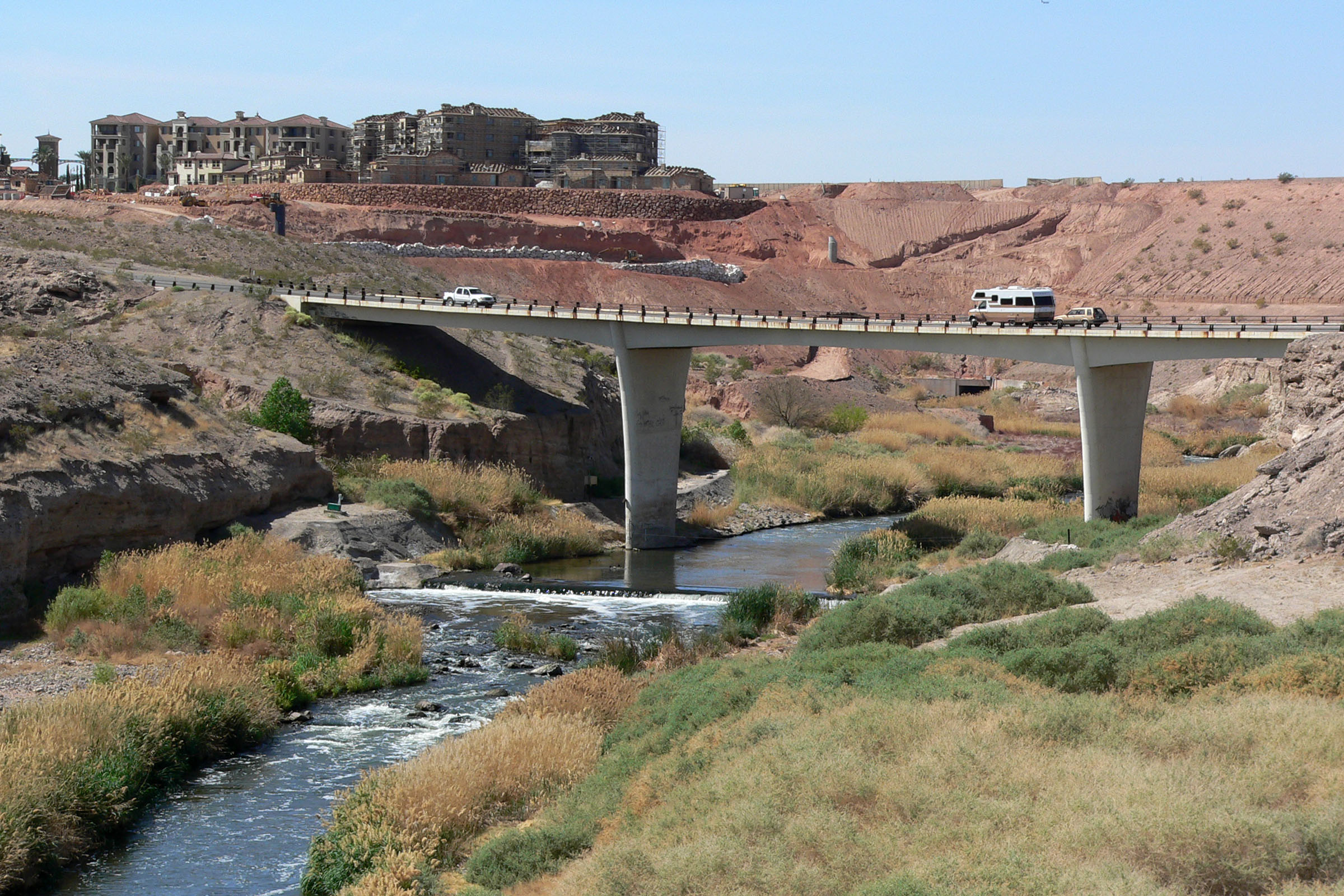
The wash just below Lake Las Vegas

Before development in the valley above the wash, it was able to contain the flows from rain water that fell in the valley and hills above. When the first sewage treatment plant went on line, the flows began increasing to the point that the channel expanded in size as the increased flows eroded the wash's stream-banks.

This erosion also deepened the channel draining one of the largest desert wetlands in the U.S. southwest as the water flowed down the channel rather than flooding the wetlands area. This has had several consequences among them, increased flows of silt into Lake Mead, fewer migratory birds, reduced water polishing from the native plants, and infestation of invasive plant species such as African Tamarisk (Tamarix africana) and Sahara Mustard (Brassica tournefortii).

== Inflows ==
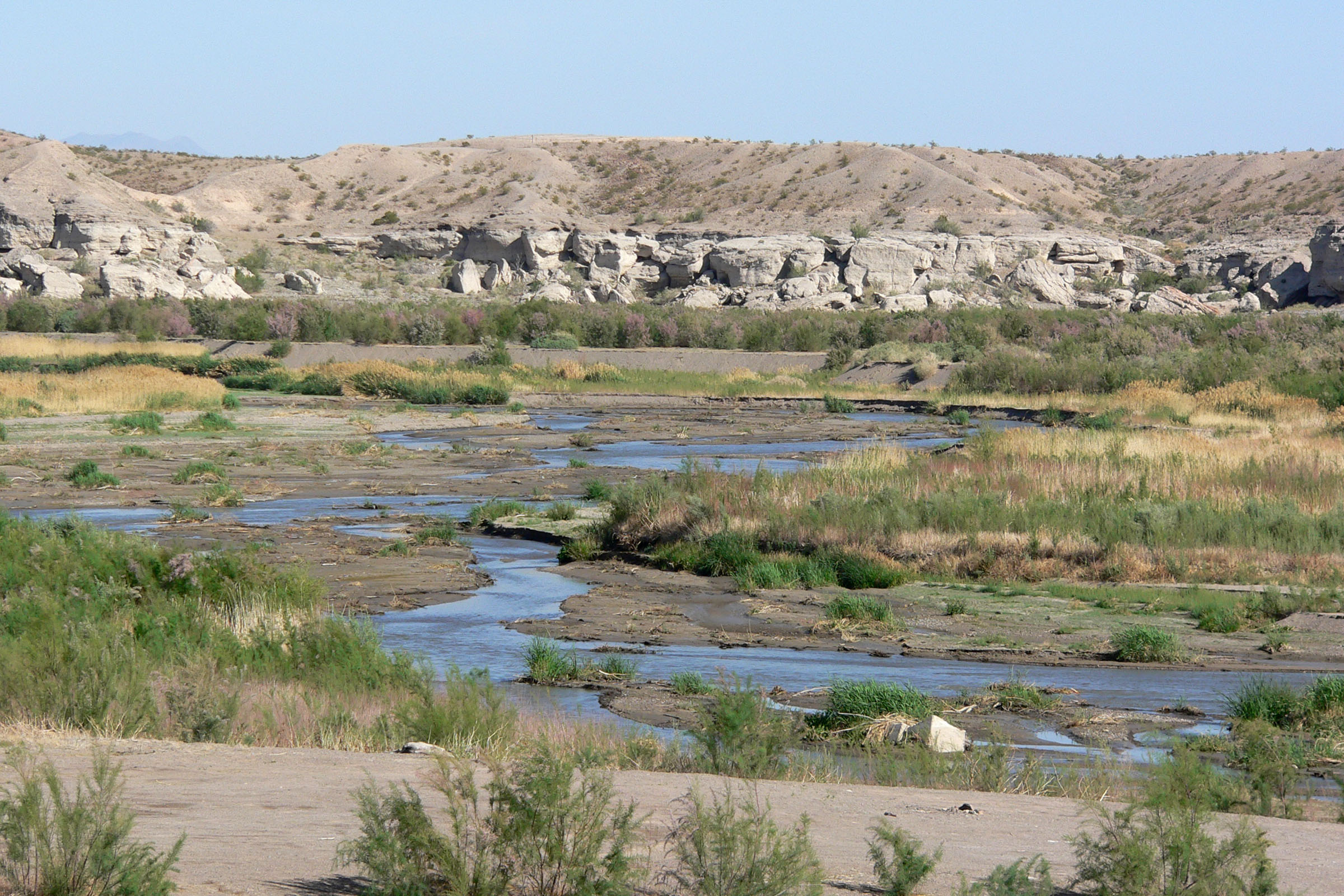
The wash just before it runs into Lake Mead

The major natural sources that feed the wash are:

- Duck Creek
- Las Vegas Creek
- Flamingo Wash
- Pittman Wash
- Monson Channel
- Sloan Channel
- Meadows Detention Basin
- Tule Springs Wash

== See also ==
- Clark County Wetlands Park
- List of tributaries of the Colorado River

== Sources ==
- Las Vegas Wash Coordination Committee
