= Nappe (water) =

Sheet of water that flows over an edge

In hydraulic engineering, a nappe is a sheet or curtain of water that flows over a weir or dam. The upper and lower water surface have well-defined characteristics that are created by the crest of a dam or weir. Both structures have different features that characterize how a nappe might flow through or over impervious concrete structures. Hydraulic engineers distinguish these two water structures in characterizing and calculating the formation of a nappe. Engineers account for the bathymetry of standing bodies (like lakes) or moving bodies of water (like rivers or streams). An appropriate crest is built for the dam or weir so that dam failure is not caused by nappe vibration or air cavitation from free-overall structures.

== Weirs ==
There are three types of nappe that form over the crest of a weir, depending on the air ventilation structure of a weir: free nappes, depressed nappes, and clinging nappes. A free nappe, which is ventilated to maintain atmospheric pressure below, does not come into contact with the underside of the weir. A depressed nappe is partially ventilated, which creates negative pressure beneath the nappe. The negative pressure leads to a 6% to 7% increase in discharged water compared to a free nappe. Clinging nappes have no air beneath, and the stream flows along the face of the weir. The shape that fills in this area is called an ogee. Discharge for these weirs is approximately 25% to 30% more than free nappes. The geometry of a weir dictates the coefficient of discharge that passes through the crest, which is proportional to the nappe formation. Engineers solve for the amount of discharge and the cross sectional area of a river to calculate the adequate shape of the weir that should be implemented.

== Dams ==
Many pathways of water can enter through a dam structure to produce a well-defined nappe. However, engineers classify dams as either overflow dams, where water consistently flows over or is blocked through a gate on top of crest, or non-overflow dams, which channel water through or around the dam with emergency floodgates. They both range in size. An overflow dam has a similar nappe typology to weirs (free, depressed, and clinging nappes). Engineers usually construct an ogee crest, which forms a clinging nappe. This increases discharge, reduces atmospheric pressure, and decreases the chances of air cavitation occurring.

== Problems ==
=== Nappe vibration ===
Nappe vibration is classified in hydraulic literature as fluid dynamic excitation; vibrations are generated by the fluid, and the flow characteristics at the point of detachment and impact are critical. This well-known phenomenon occurs on free-overall structures (i.e. weirs, fountains, or dams) and produces excessive noise on concrete structures. These are undesirable and dangerous on gates and further characterized by oscillations in the thin-flow nappe cascading downstream of the crest. The vibrations send out a constant noise as water flows over structure, and may lead to cracks or air cavitation, which cause catastrophic failure. The phenomenon results from Kelvin–Helmholtz instability, the shear forces that occur between two fluids of different velocities.

=== Cavitation ===
Cavitation is defined as the explosive growth of vapor bubbles within a liquid. These bubbles are formed in, and may be carried into, areas of higher local pressures, which disappear before by collapse. Surface irregularities on hydraulic structures are prone to experiencing cavitation. Damage on this type of surface will start at the downstream end of the cloud of collapsing cavitation bubbles. Damage from cavitation has been reported in several hydraulic structures, including open-channel spillways, bottom outlets in dams, high-head gates and gate slots, and energy dissipators with hydraulic-jump stilling basins. The velocity of water that impinges at the surface point is one of the causes of cavitation. Also, the increased height of spillways on high dams leads to an increase of cavitation caused by nappe flow.
