= Flow control structure =

Devices that alter the way fluids flow in a pipe

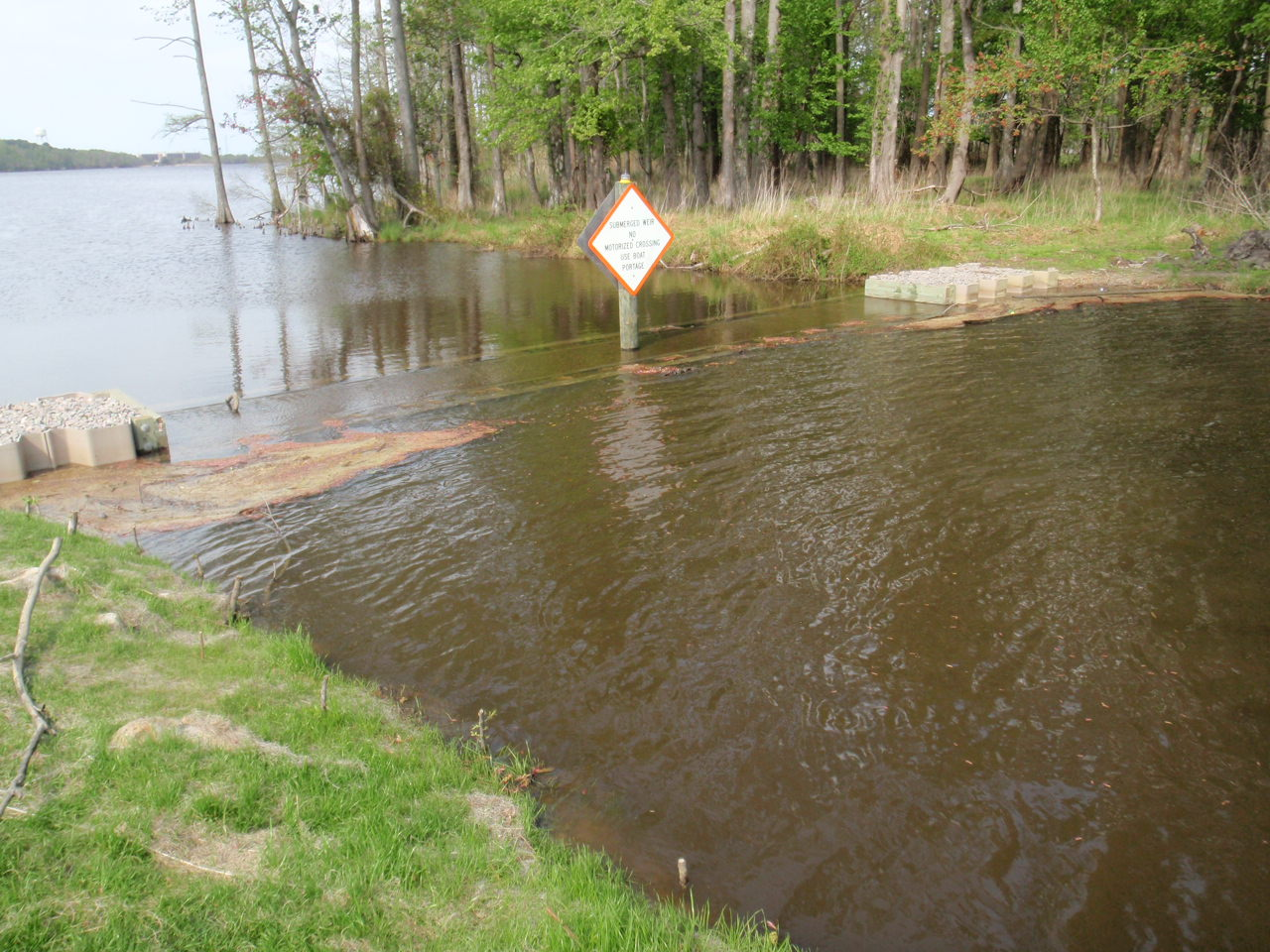
Weir on Lake Tecumseh, Virginia

A flow control structure is a device that alters the flow of water in a stream, drainage channel or pipe. As a group these are passive structures since they operate without intervention under different amounts of water flow and their impact changes based on the quantity of water available. This includes weirs, flow splitters and proprietary-design devices that are used for stormwater management and in combined sewers.

Flow-control structures are known to have existed for thousands of years. Some built by the Chinese have been in continuous use for over 2,000 years. The Chinese used these structures to divert water to irrigate fields and to actually deposit silt in specific areas so that the channels were not blocked by silt build-up. Structures like this required yearly maintenance to remove the accumulated silt.

More modern structures add to these basic principles. In Hawaii, there are numerous flow-control structures that have been built to irrigate the pineapple and sugar cane fields. The purpose of these structures is to divert water into the various canals and to keep them full. When over full, they dump excess water back into either streams or other canals. Among the simplest is a low dam across a shallow stream, forcing all of the water to one side to allow it to be easily collected in a canal. This can keep a canal full even with very low flows in a stream.

Another simple device is a series of concrete piers installed in a spillway to slow down the descending water so that it does not cause damage at the bottom of the spillway.

== Applications ==
- Low-impact development
- Sustainable drainage system
- Water-sensitive urban design

== See also ==
- Valve
