= Alan Bible Visitor Center =

Visitor center at Lake Mead National Recreation Area in Nevada, United States

Coordinates: 36.01001°N 114.79674°W

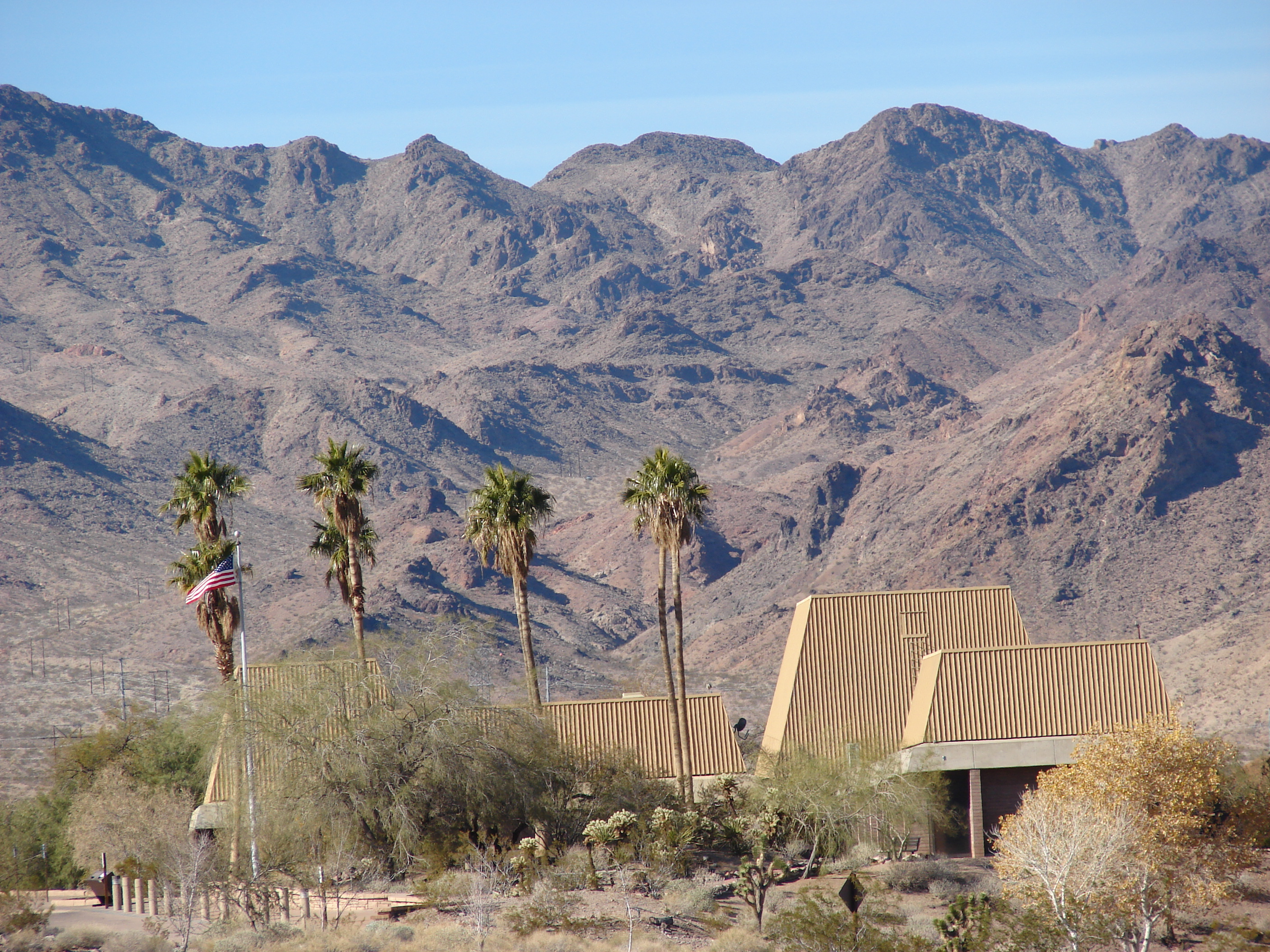
- View of the visitor center.
- Interactive map of Alan Bible Visitor Center
- Location: Nevada, United States

The Alan Bible Visitor Center is a visitor center located at Lake Mead National Recreation Area. The visitor center features a 20-minute movie about the recreation area. There is also an array of exhibits, a gift shop, and a desert botanical garden. It was completed around 1966. It is named in honor of Senator Alan Bible (1909–1988) who worked with park service officials.

== Alan Bible Botanical Garden ==
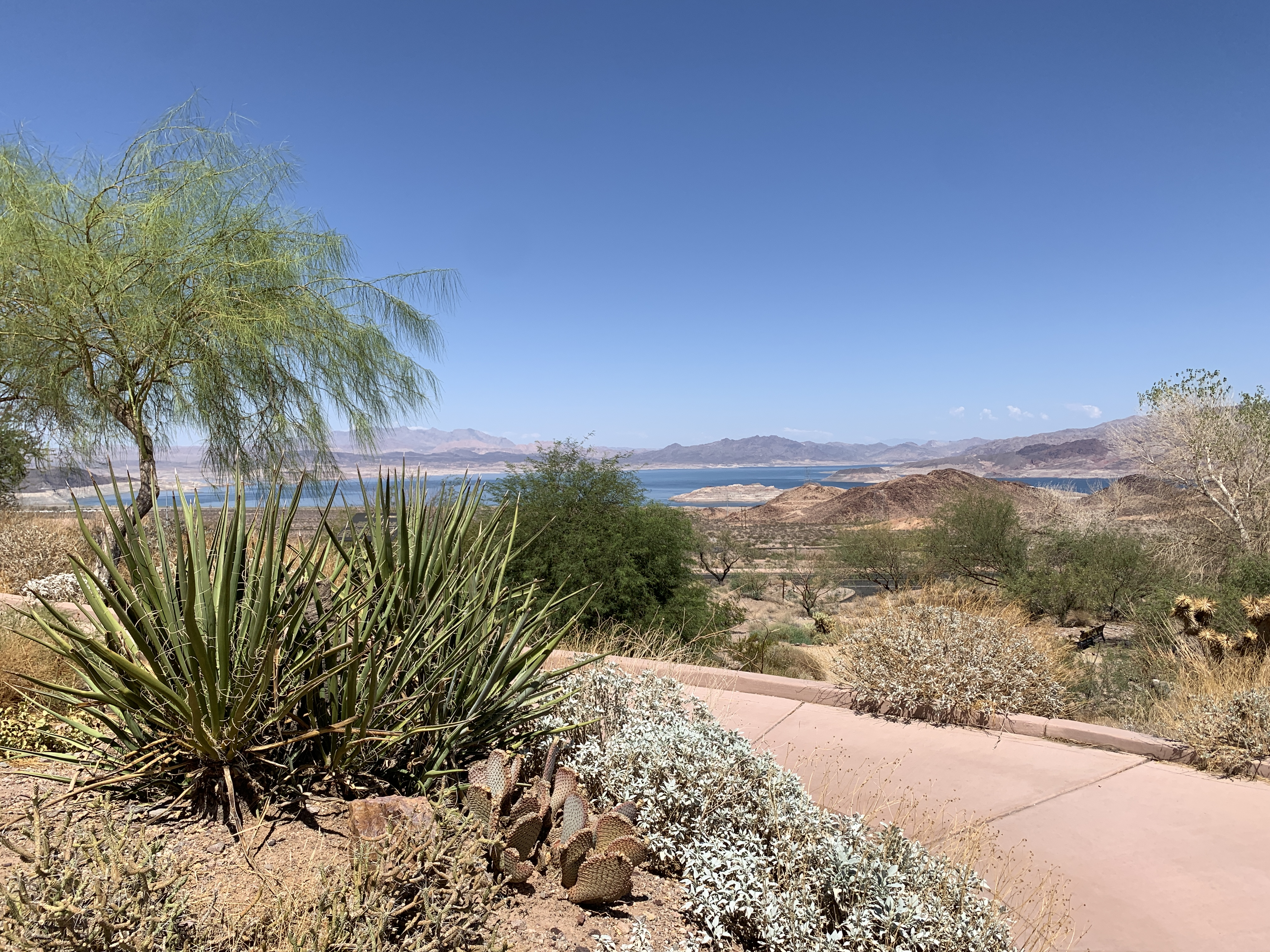
Alan Bible Botanical Garden

The Alan Bible Botanical Garden is a desert botanical garden located at the Alan Bible Visitor Center, Lake Mead National Recreation Area, 601 Nevada Highway, Boulder City, Nevada, United States.

The garden is mostly cactus, but also displays some of the area's desert trees and shrubs, and identifies plant communities found throughout the recreation area.

== See also ==
- List of botanical gardens and arboretums in the United States
