= Boulder Canyon (Colorado River) =

Flooded canyon, Lake Mead, Colorado River

- Location within Arizona

Geography
- Coordinates: 36°07′32″N 114°40′36″W
- Interactive map of Boulder Canyon

Boulder Canyon, originally Devils Gate Canyon, is a canyon on the Colorado River, above Hoover Dam, now flooded by Lake Mead. It lies between Clark County, Nevada and Mohave County, Arizona. It heads at western end of the Virgin River Basin of Lake Mead, at about 36°09′05″N 114°32′51″W. Boulder Canyon divides the Black Mountains into the Black Mountains of Arizona, and the Black Mountains of Nevada. Its mouth is now under the eastern end of the Boulder Basin of Lake Mead, between Canyon Point in Nevada and Canyon Ridge in Arizona. Its original mouth is now underneath Lake Mead between Beacon Rock and Fortification Ridge on the southern shore in Arizona.

== History ==
From 1879 to 1887, the Southwestern Mining Company mined large quantities of salt in the mountains along the Virgin River. The company leased steamboats from the Colorado Steam Navigation Company to ship the salt to the mill at Eldorado Canyon. In April 1883, Captain John Alexander Mellon took a small boat upriver to Devil's Gate Canyon to install six ring bolts; each of which are eight inches in diameter, four feet long, and made of 1.75-inch-diameter iron. These ring bolts were used to secure lines from the steamboats as they navigated the dangerous rapids of Devil's Gate Canyon during high water runs to the mouth of the Virgin River at Rioville, Nevada.
