= Callville Bay =

Waterway in Nevada

Coordinates: 36°8′26″N 114°43′7″W

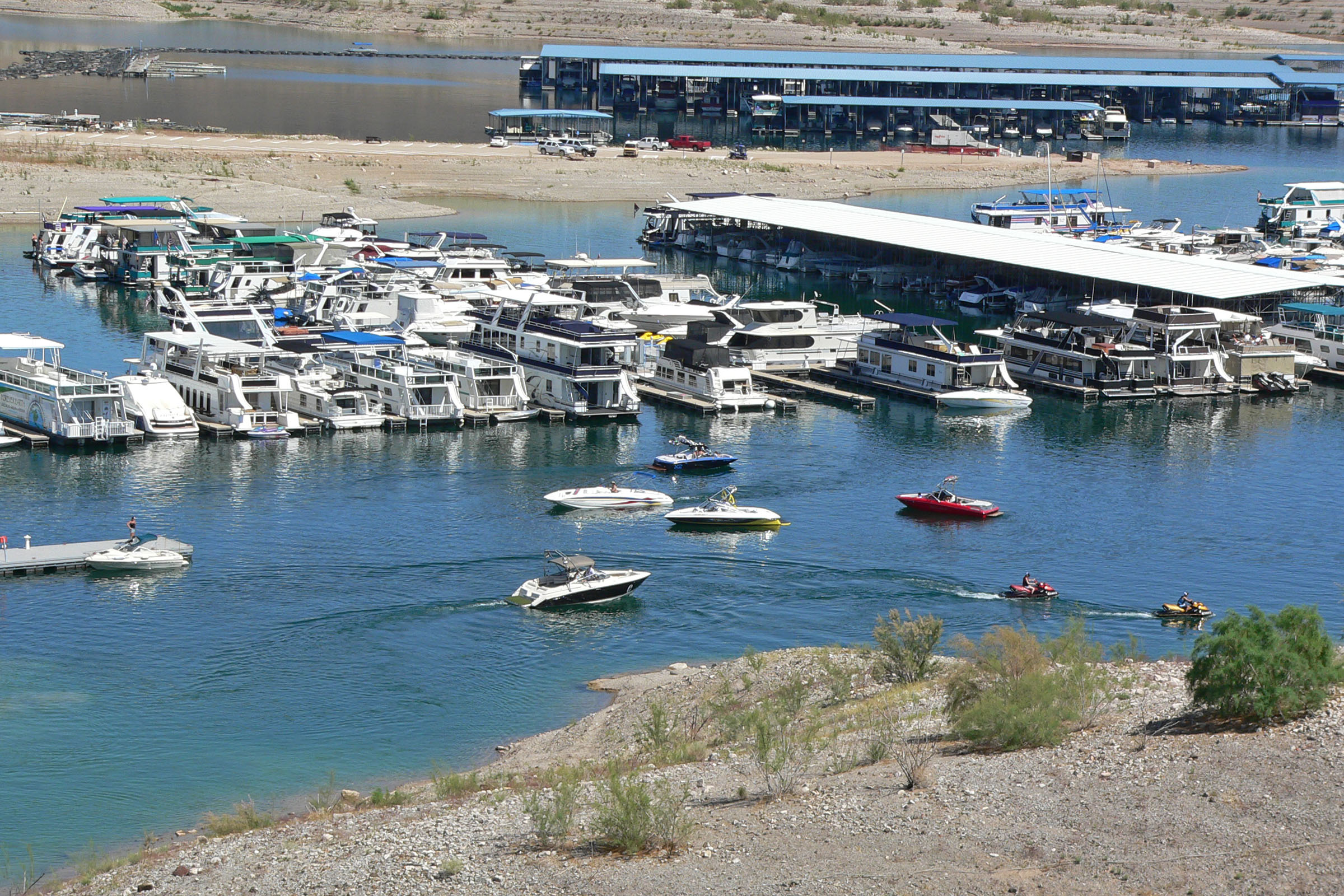
Callville Bay marina

Callville Bay is a waterway on the northwestern side of Lake Mead in the U.S. state of Nevada. It has a marina and camping resort. Situated east of Las Vegas and upstream from Las Vegas Bay, it lies within the Lake Mead National Recreation Area, which was established in 1935. Its name derives from the settlement of Callville which was established in 1865 by Anson Call under a directive led by Brigham Young. Though the settlement was abandoned in 1869, and submerged under Lake Mead when the Colorado River was dammed, Callville Bay retained the name.

== History ==
The bay derives its name from the permanent settlement of Callville, known alternately as Call's Landing, Call's Fort, and Old Callville. The settlement, containing residences, a warehouse, and irrigation systems, was established on December 2, 1864, by Anson Call, James Whitmore, A. M. Cannon, Jacob Hamblin and son, under a directive to Call by Brigham Young. The steamboat port of Callville was used for shipping freight to Salt Lake City. The bay was formed and the settlement was submerged after the Colorado River was dammed to form Lake Mead.

== Features ==
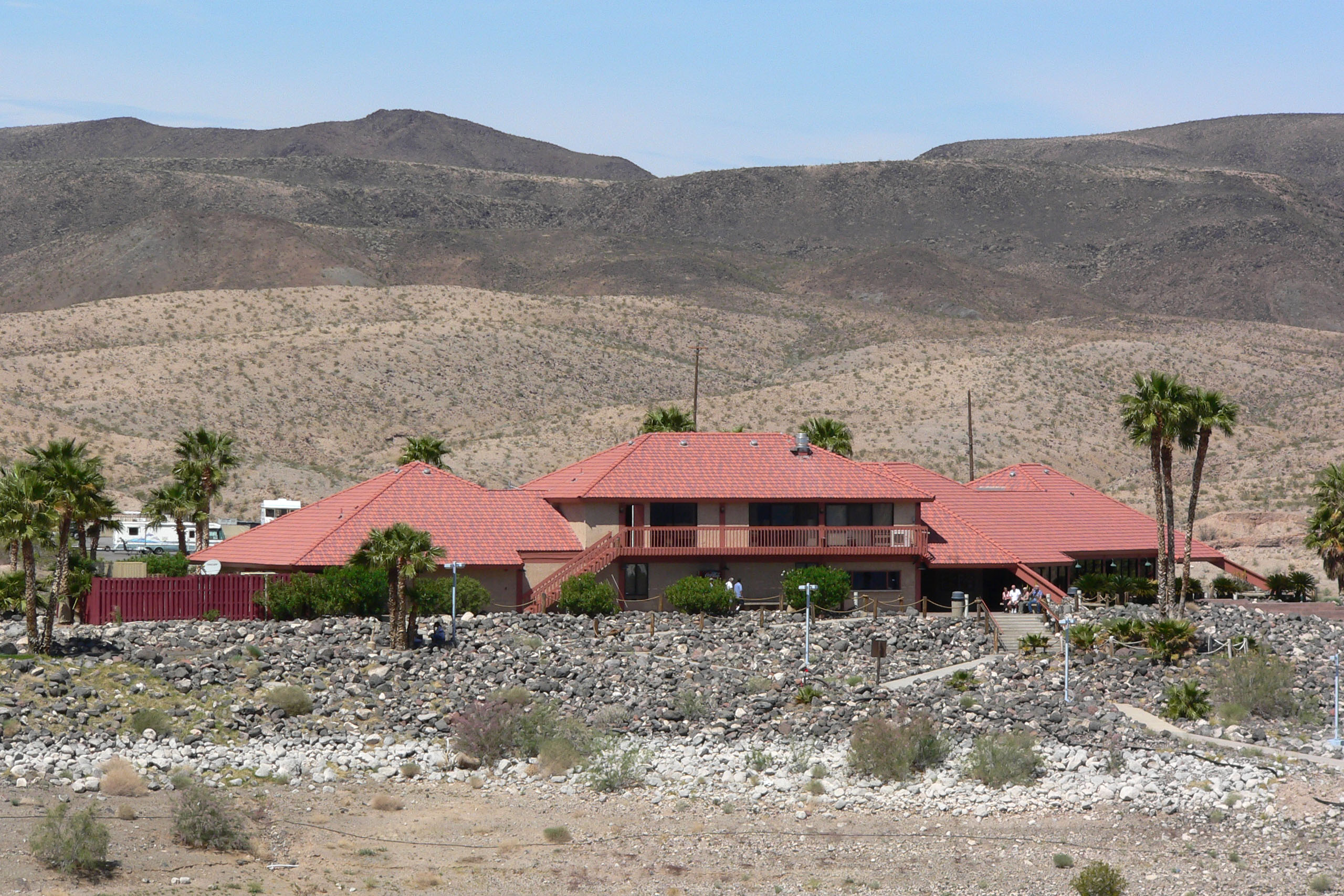
Callville Bay store

A marina, created after the Hoover Dam was built, is a common launching point for boats onto the lake. It contains 589 boat slips; fishing boats and houseboats are available for rent. Callville also contains a restaurant, lounge, small store, and campground accommodating for about 80 camps.

== Geography ==
Callville settlement was located on the Muddy River in the extreme southeast section of Nevada. The bay is accessed from the land via Callville Bay Road, a turnoff from Callville Bay Junction. The junction is situated 18 miles (29 km) northeast of Henderson while Echo Bay Junction is 24 miles (39 km) to the northeast and Overton is a further 23 miles (37 km). The topography is described as hilly, with no flood hazards near the developed area.

To the north lies Black Mesa, which is characterized by "pink, brown, and red-brown sandstone and siltstone" that lies by the Bitter Spring Valley fault. The nearby "Callville Mesa" is a flat-topped hill capped by volcanic rock. Flora include willows, oleanders, Russian olives, yuccas, palms, and pines trees.
