= Las Vegas Bay =

Bay in Clark County, Nevada

Coordinates: 36°07′00″N 114°51′03″W

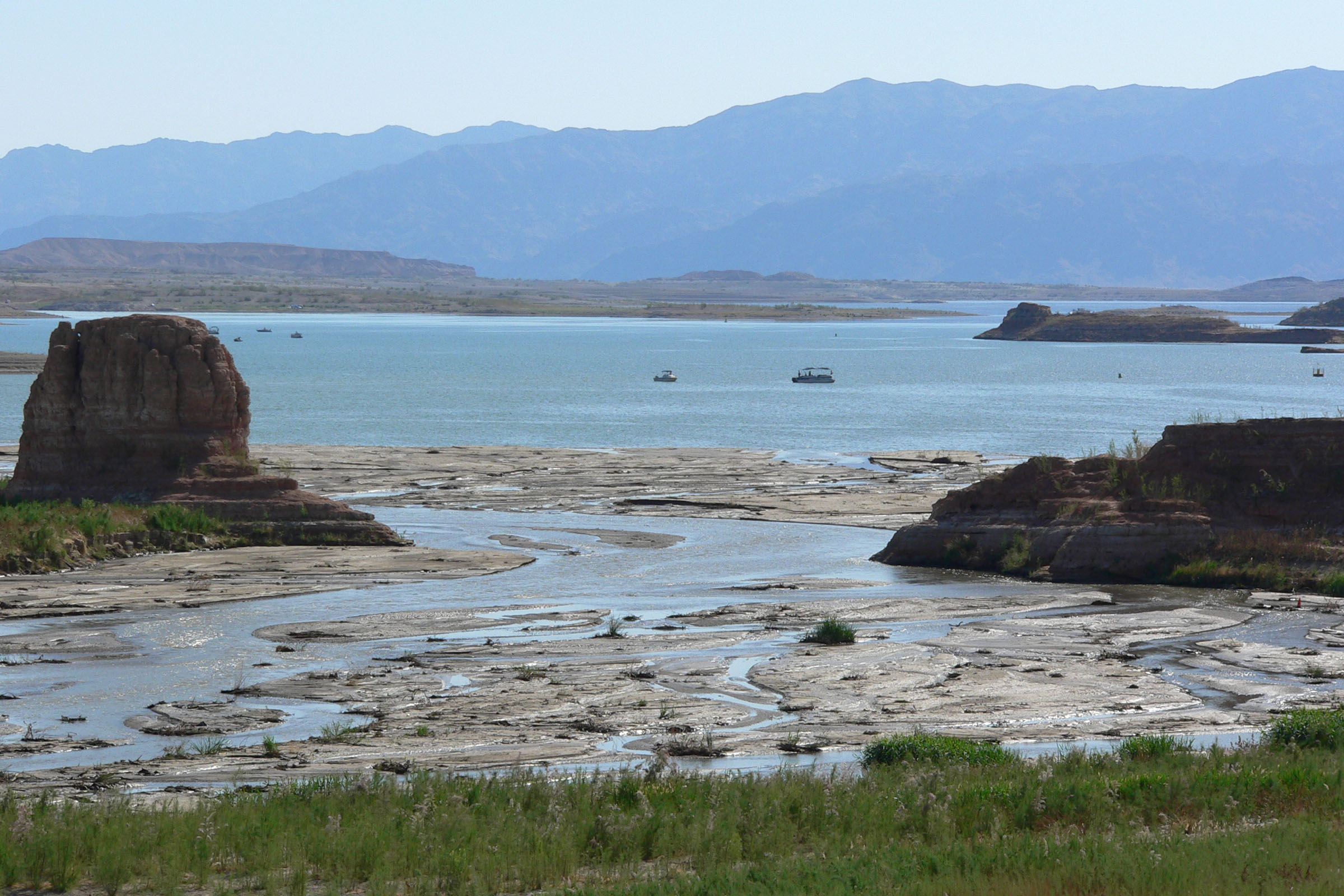
Las Vegas Bay where Las Vegas Wash empties into it.

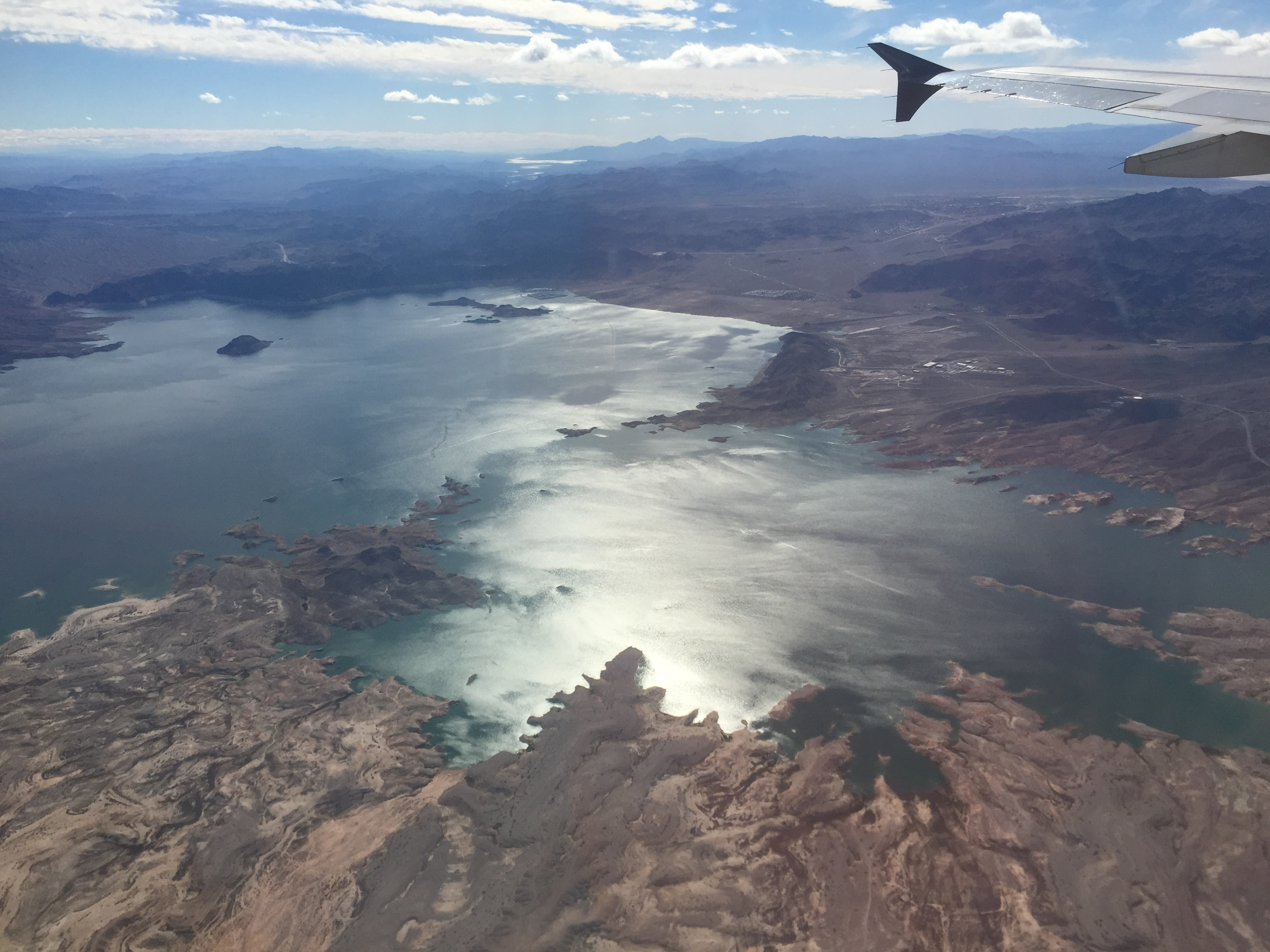
View of Las Vegas Bay from an airplane

Las Vegas Bay is a bay at the western edge of Lake Mead in the U.S. state of Nevada. The bay is located within the Lake Mead National Recreation Area to the northeast of the city of Henderson, Nevada, near the junction of Lake Mead Drive and Lake Mead Boulevard. A public campground and boat access are available in Las Vegas Bay. Low water levels of Lake Mead have rendered the marina there inoperable, and it has moved to the Hemenway Boat Harbor, in the south end of the Boulder Basin. The launch ramp there has also been closed due to the water levels.

The bay is the natural discharge point for the Las Vegas Wash.
