= Lake Mead =

Reservoir on the Colorado River in Arizona and Nevada

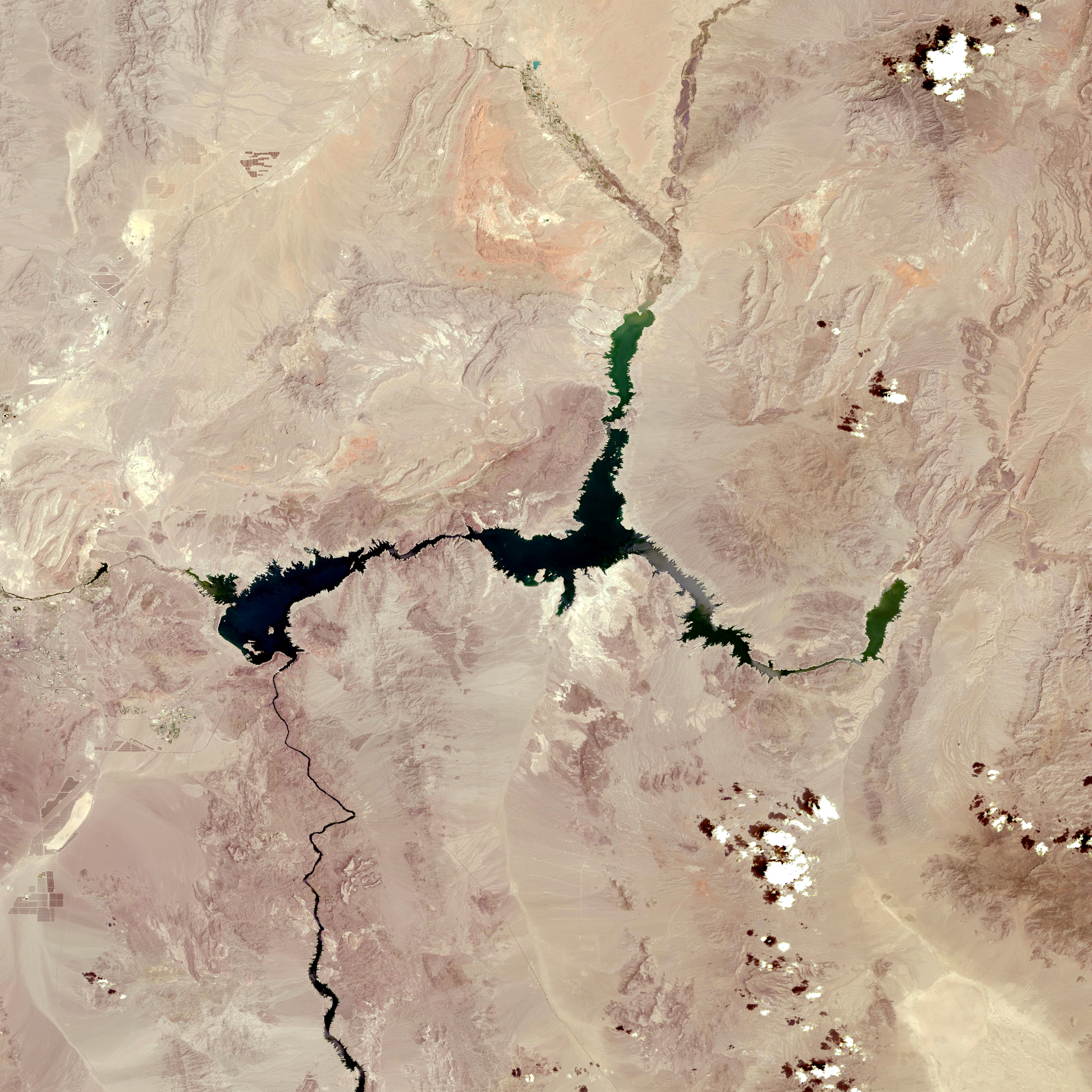
- Satellite imagery from Landsat 8 of Lake Mead in July 2022 during the 2020–23 North American drought

- Location within Nevada Location within the United States
- Location: Clark County, Nevada and Mohave County, Arizona
- Coordinates: 36.25°N 114.39°W
- Lake type: Reservoir
- Primary inflows: Colorado River, Virgin River
- Primary outflows: Colorado River
- Basin countries: United States
- First flooded: September 30, 1935; 91 years ago by the Hoover Dam
- Max. length: 120 mi (190 km)
- Surface area: 247 mi^{2} (640 km^{2})
- Max. depth: 532 ft (162 m)
- Water volume: Maximum: 26,134,000 acre⋅ft (32.236 km^{3})
- Shore length^{1}: 759 mi (1,221 km)
- Surface elevation: Maximum: 1,229 ft (375 m)
- Website: Lake Mead National Recreation Area
- ^{1} Shore length is not a well-defined measure.

Lake Mead is a reservoir formed by the Hoover Dam on the Colorado River in the Southwestern United States. It is located in the states of Nevada and Arizona, 24 mi (39 km) east of Las Vegas. It is the largest reservoir in the US in terms of water capacity. Lake Mead provides water to the states of Arizona, California, and Nevada as well as some of Mexico, providing sustenance to nearly 20 million people and large areas of farmland. Lake Mead fell to its lowest level since its original filling on 7 August 2026 (elevation 1040.40 ft) and has reached an elevation of only 1037.16 feet as of 22 October 2026.

At maximum capacity, Lake Mead is 112 miles (180 km) long, 532 feet (162 m) at its greatest depth, has a surface elevation of 1,229 feet (375 m) above sea level, has a surface area of 247 square miles (640 km^{2}), and contains 28.23 million acre-feet (34.82 km^{3}) of water.

The lake has remained below full capacity since 1983 owing to drought and increased water demand. On May 31, 2022, Lake Mead held 26.63% of full capacity at 7.517 million acre-feet (9,272,000 megaliters), having dropped in June 2021 below the reservoir's previous all-time low of 9.328 million acre-feet (11,506,000 megaliters) recorded in July 2016, and never returning to that level. By December 2024, following the implementation of water conservation measures, Lake Mead's water levels had risen by 16 feet over two years, before falling to a new low level in August 2026.

== History ==
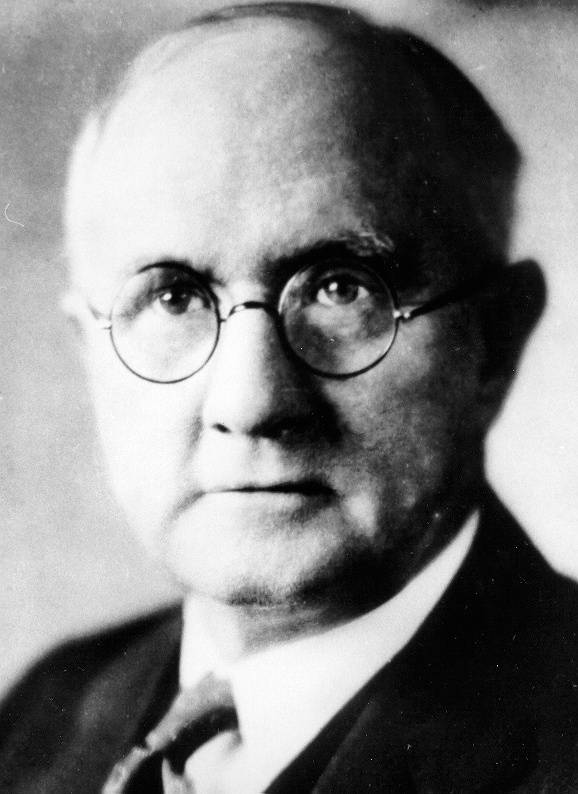
Elwood Mead

The area that was chosen to become Lake Mead, was formerly settled by Ancestral Puebloans. Many archaeological sites were submerged by the creation of Lake Mead, including the most representative, which is referred to as the "Lost City". The lake was named after Elwood Mead, who was the commissioner of the U.S. Bureau of Reclamation from 1924 to 1936, during the planning and construction of the Boulder Canyon Project that created the dam and lake. Lloyd Joseph Hudlow, an engineer with the Bureau of Reclamation, came to Boulder City in March 1933 to assist in the survey, and ended up as the project manager.

Lake Mead was established as the Boulder Dam Recreation Area in 1936, administered by the National Park Service. The name was changed to the Lake Mead National Recreation Area in 1947, and Lake Mohave and the Shivwits Plateau were later added to its jurisdiction. Both lakes and the surrounding area offer year-round recreation options.

The accumulated water from Hoover Dam forced the evacuation of several communities, most notably St. Thomas, Nevada, the last resident of which left the town in 1938. The ruins of St. Thomas are currently visible (as of May 23, 2022) via dirt road and hiking trail, due to Lake Mead's low water level. Lake Mead also covered the sites of the Colorado River landings of Callville and Rioville, Nevada, and the river crossing of Bonelli's Ferry, between Arizona and Nevada. Six years after the dam's construction, the lake filled to an elevation of 1200 feet.

At lower water levels, a high-water mark is visible in photos that show the shoreline of Lake Mead. The high-water mark is white because of the deposition of minerals on previously submerged surfaces.

== Geography ==
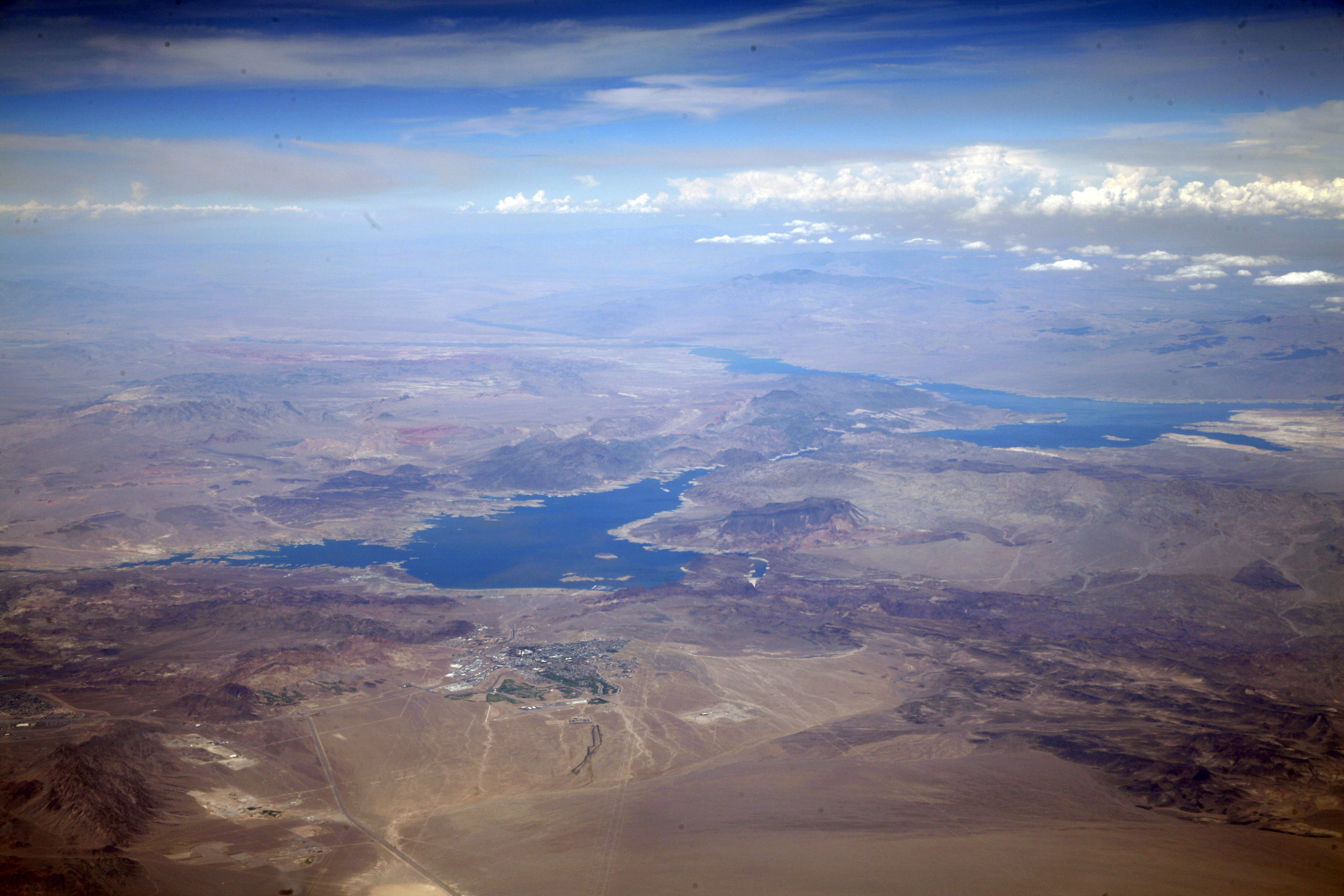
Aerial view of Lake Mead in August 2010

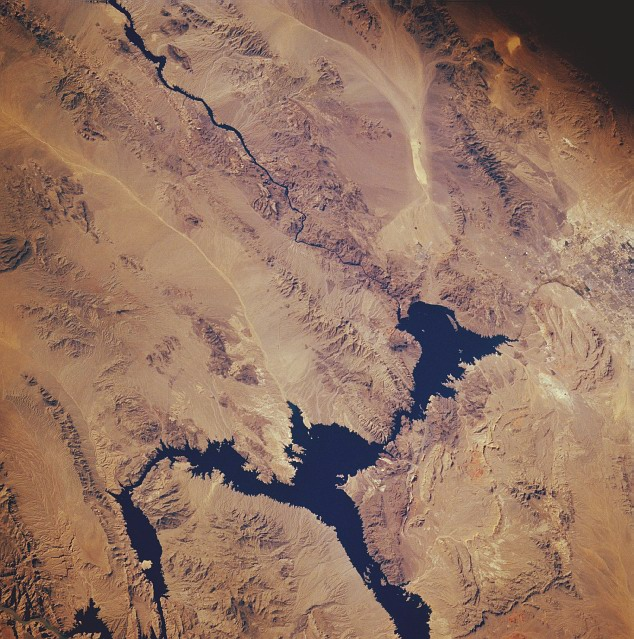
Lake Mead from space in November 1985: North is facing downward to the right. The Colorado River can be seen leading southward away from the lake on the top left. The Hoover Dam is located where the river meets the lake.

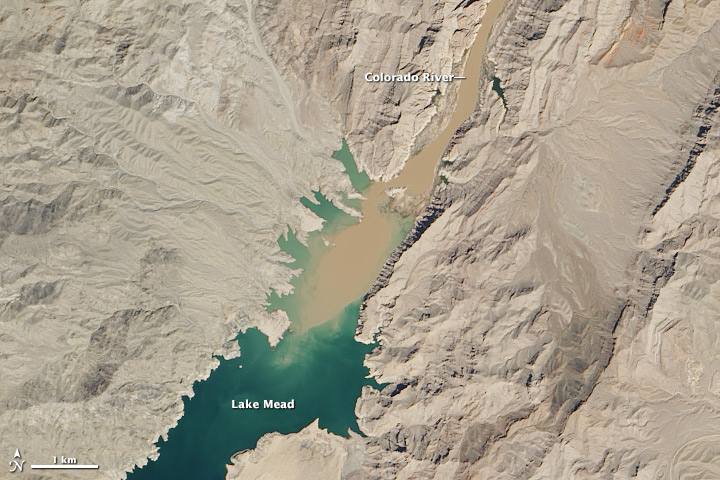
Sediment-laden water from the Colorado River flowing into Lake Mead in March 2013.

Nine main access points to the lake are available. On the west are three roads from the Las Vegas metropolitan area. Access from the north-west from Interstate 15 is through the Valley of Fire State Park and the Moapa River Indian Reservation to the Overton Arm of the lake.

The lake is divided into several bodies. The large body closest to the Hoover Dam is Boulder Basin. The narrow channel, which was once known as Boulder Canyon and is now known as The Narrows, connects Boulder Basin to Virgin Basin to the east. The Virgin River and Muddy River empty into the Overton Arm, which is connected to the northern part of the Virgin Basin. The next basin to the east is Temple Basin, and following that is Gregg Basin, which is connected to the Temple Basin by the Virgin Canyon.

When the lake levels are high enough, a section of the lake farther upstream from the Gregg Basin is flooded, which includes Grand Wash Bay, the Pearce Ferry Bay and launch ramp, and about 55 miles (89 km) of the Colorado River within the lower Grand Canyon, extending to the foot of 240 Mile Rapids (north of Peach Springs, Arizona). In addition, two small basins, the Muddy River Inlet and the Virgin River Basin, are flooded when the lake is high enough where these two rivers flow into the lake. As of February 2015, these basins remain dry.

Jagged mountain ranges surround the lake, offering a scenic backdrop, especially at sunset. Two mountain ranges are within view of the Boulder Basin, the River Mountains, oriented northwest to southeast and the Muddy Mountains, oriented west to northeast. Bonelli Peak lies to the east of the Virgin Basin.

Las Vegas Bay is the terminus for the Las Vegas Wash which is the sole outflow from the Las Vegas Valley.

== Drought and water usage issues ==
In the 21st century, the water level of Lake Mead has declined from near maximum capacity to within 100 feet (30 m) of the minimum level needed for Hoover Dam to generate electricity.

Lake Mead receives the majority of its water from snow melt in the Colorado, Wyoming, and Utah Rocky Mountains. Inflows to the lake are largely moderated by the upstream Glen Canyon Dam, which is required to release around 8.23 million acre-feet (10,150,000 Ml) of water each year to Lake Mead under the Colorado River Compact. Releases from Hoover Dam have been over 9 million acre-feet (11,000,000 Ml) of water each year, which has led to declining levels in Lake Mead since 2000.

Outflow, which includes evaporation and delivery to Arizona, California, Nevada, and Mexico from Lake Mead is generally in the range of 9.5 to 9.7 million acre-feet (11,700,000 to 12,000,000 megaliters), resulting in a net annual deficit of about 1.2 million acre-feet (1,500,000 ML). Farmers in California's Imperial Valley hold some of the oldest water rights and receive the largest share of water as of 2024.

Before the filling of Lake Powell (a reservoir of similar size to Lake Mead) behind Glen Canyon Dam, the Colorado River flowed largely unregulated into Lake Mead, making Mead more vulnerable to drought. From 1953 to 1956, the water level fell from 1,200 to 1,085 feet (366 to 331 m). During the filling of Lake Powell from 1963 to 1965, the water level fell from 1,205 to 1,090 feet (367 to 332 m). Many wet years from the 1970s to the 1990s filled both lakes to capacity, reaching a record high of 1,225 feet (373 m) in the summer of 1983.

In these decades prior to 2000, Glen Canyon Dam frequently released more than the required 8.23 million acre-feet (10,150,000 ML) to Lake Mead each year. That allowed Lake Mead to maintain a high water level despite releasing significantly more water than it is contracted for. Since 2000, the Colorado River has experienced the southwestern North American megadrought, with average or above-average conditions occurring in only five years (2005, 2008–2009, 2011 and 2014) in the first 16 years of the 21st century. Of any 16-year period in the last 60 years, 2000-2015 had the lowest water availability.

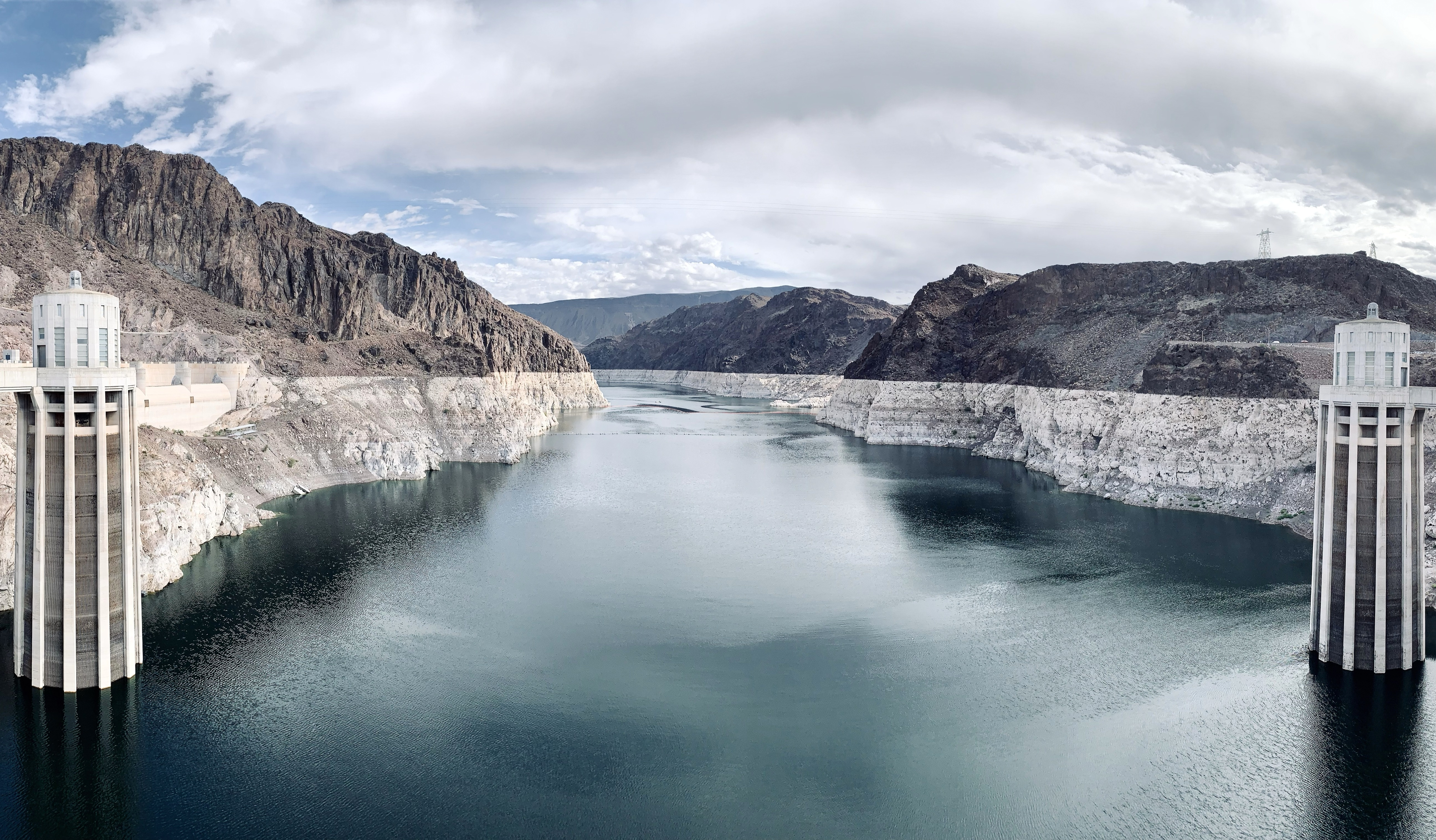
Lake Mead in October 2021, as seen from the Hoover Dam with the white band showing the high water level

In June 2010, the lake was at 39% of its capacity, and on November 30, 2010, it reached 1,081.94 feet (329.78 m), setting a new record monthly low. From mid-May 2011 to January 22, 2012, Lake Mead's water elevation increased from 1,095.5 to 1,134.52 feet (333.91 to 345.80 m) after a heavy snowmelt in the Rocky Mountains prompted the release of an extra 3.3 million acre-feet (4,100,000 ML) from Glen Canyon into Lake Mead.

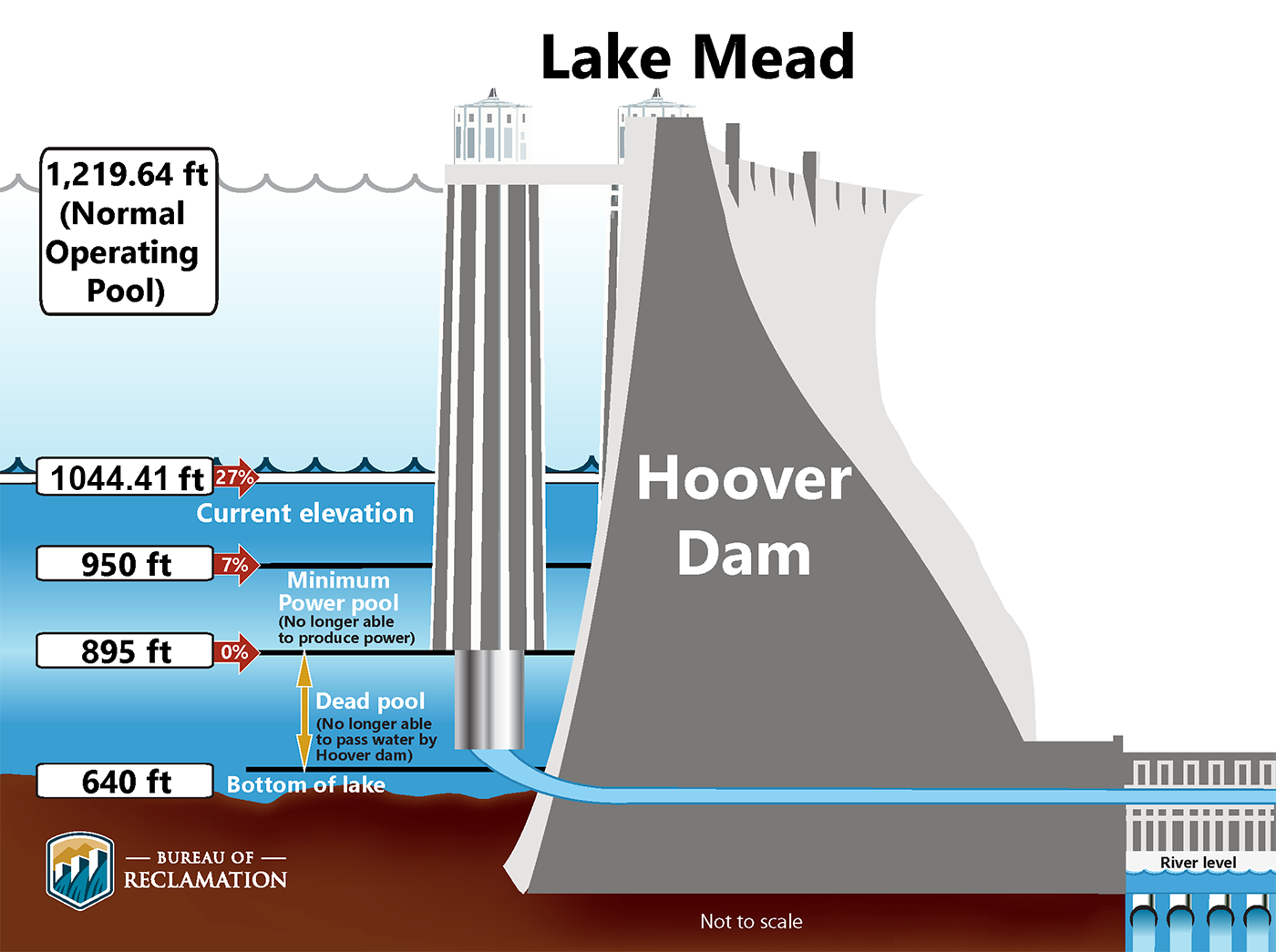
Cross-section of the Hoover Dam showing notable levels of Lake Mead

In 2012 and 2013, the Colorado River basin experienced its worst consecutive water years on record, prompting a low Glen Canyon release in 2014 – the lowest since 1963, during the initial filling of Lake Powell – in the interest of recovering the level of the upstream reservoir, which had fallen to less than 40% capacity as a result of the drought. Consequently, Lake Mead's level fell significantly, reaching a new record low in 2014, 2015 and 2016.

In 2014, its record low was 1,081.82 feet (329.74 m) on July 10, 2014. On June 26, 2015, Lake Mead reached another new record low when it fell to 1,074.71 feet (327.57 m) for the first time since the lake was filled, which risked triggering drought restrictions. If the lake is below the elevation of 1,075 feet at the beginning of the water year, an official shortage declaration by the Bureau of Reclamation will enforce water rationing in Arizona and Nevada. The water year begins October 1 to coincide with seasonal Rocky Mountain snowfall, which produces most of the Colorado River's flow.

A comparison of Lake Mead water levels from July 2000 to July 2015

Lake Mead's water level rebounded a few feet by October 2015 and avoided triggering the drought restrictions. The water level started falling in Spring 2016 and fell below the drought trigger level of 1,075 feet again in May 2016. It fell to a new record low of 1,071.60 feet (326.62 m) on July 1, 2016, before beginning to rebound slowly. Drought restrictions were narrowly avoided again when the lake level rose above 1,075 feet on September 28, 2016, three days before the deadline, and the Bureau of Land Reclamation did not issue a shortage declaration.

A reprieve from the steady annual decline occurred in 2017, when lake levels rose throughout the year due to heavier than normal snowfall in the Rocky Mountains. As a result of the large snowmelt, the lake regained the water levels it had in 2015 with a seasonal high of 1,089.77 feet (332.16 m). The seasonal low of 1,078.96 feet (328.87 m) in 2017 was close to that experienced in 2014, safely above the drought trigger. That level was still 36 feet (11 m) below the seasonal low experienced in 2012, and the lake was projected to begin falling again in 2018.

Despite those and other predictions of an impending shortage determination by 2020, snowpack of 140% of average in the Upper Colorado River basin as of April 2019 resulted in 128% above average inflow into Lake Powell, resulting in 1,090.20-foot (332.29 m) water level on Lake Mead. In December 2019, Lake Mead water level reached 1,090.47 feet (332.38 m), about ten feet (three meters) above projections. As of April, 2020, the water level stood at 1,096.39 feet (334.18 m), again benefiting from above average mountain snowpack (107% of average).

From 2018 to early-2021, Lake Mead water levels remained well above the 1,075-foot (328 m) level that would trigger a shortage determination. However, by mid-2021 its level fell below the trigger elevation and was projected to keep falling through 2022, which led the Bureau of Reclamation to declare a water shortage in August 2021. On July 28, 2022, the level was 1,040.58 feet (317.17 m), the lowest level since 1937 when the reservoir was initially filled. The lake rebounded somewhat from its low point in 2022, but its level still remained below the drought threshold until reaching another record low in August 2026.

As a result of the decreasing water level, marinas and boat launch ramps have either had to be relocated to another area of the lake or have closed down permanently. The Las Vegas Bay Marina was relocated in 2002 and the Lake Mead Marina was relocated in 2008 to Hemenway Harbor. Overton Marina and Echo Bay Marina have been closed due to low levels in the northern part of the Overton Arm. Government Wash, Las Vegas Bay, and Pearce Ferry boat launch ramps have been closed. Las Vegas Boat Harbor and Lake Mead Marina in Hemenway Harbor/Horsepower Cove remain open, along with Callville Bay Marina, Temple Bar Marina, Boulder Launch Area (former location of the Lake Mead Marina) and the South Cove launch ramp.

Changing rainfall patterns, climate variability, high levels of evaporation, reduced snow melt runoff, and current water use patterns are putting pressure on water management resources at Lake Mead as the population relying on it for water, and the Hoover Dam for electricity, continues to increase. To lower the minimum lake level necessary to generate electricity from 1,050 feet (320 m) to 950 feet (290 m), Hoover Dam was retrofitted with wide-head turbines, designed to work efficiently with less flow in 2015 and 2016.

If water levels continue to drop, Hoover Dam would cease generating electricity when the water level falls below 950 feet (290 m) and the lake would stabilize at a level of 895 feet (273 m) when the water reaches the lowest water outlet of the dam. In order to ensure that the city of Las Vegas will continue to be able to draw its drinking water from Lake Mead, nearly $1.5 billion was spent on building a new water intake tunnel in the middle of the lake at the elevation of 860 feet (260 m). The 3-mile (4.8 km) tunnel took seven years to build under the lake and was put into operation in late 2015.

According to a 2016 estimate, about 6% of Lake Mead's water evaporates annually. Covering 6% of Lake Mead with floating photovoltaics has a potential generating capacity of 3,400 megawatts, which is comparable to the capacity of Hoover Dam, and would reduce water lost to evaporation in the covered area by as much as 90%. A 2021 estimate found that covering 10% of the lake's surface with foam-backed floating photovoltaics could result in "enough water conserved and electricity generated to service Las Vegas and Reno combined."

In December 2021, with Lake Mead at 35% of capacity, Arizona, California, Nevada, and the U.S. Department of the Interior signed an agreement to spend $200 million for 2022 and 2023 to subsidize water users who voluntarily reduce their usage or undertake capital projects to improve efficiency. Along with a variety of state and local regulations, this "500+ Plan" aimed to retain an additional 500,000 acre-feet (620,000,000 m^{3}) in the reservoir. At the same time an agreement was reached with the Gila River Indian Community and the Colorado River Indian Tribes which was expected to save an estimated 11 vertical feet of reservoir water. In 2023 and 2024, several agreements between the United States Bureau of Reclamation, six water agencies from Southern California and the Fort Yuma Quechan Indian Tribe formalized a commitment to reduce water use by 1.6 million acre-feet by the end of 2026. In December 2024, the Colorado River Board of California announced that 75% of this commitment had been achieved already, with California's water uses having reached "their lowest levels since the 1940s", and that Lake Mead's water levels had risen by 16 feet within two years.

In February 2025, climatologists confirmed that although Lakes Mead and Powell are in better shape than they had been in recent years, they are still only about 35% full.

== Anthropological role in forensics ==
Severe drought lowers the level of the lake, affording social anthropologists opportunities to study indigenous dwellings that were previously submerged. Meanwhile, their forensic colleagues are routinely called in whenever relatively contemporary remains of people are revealed, to investigate scientifically who the deceased might have been in life, how they died, and how their bodies got to the lake. For example, the 2020–2023 North American drought caused a series of unexplained human remains to be revealed, prompting speculation about how many more will be discovered as the water level recedes. However, this is not the first time such mysteries have surfaced at Lake Mead:

- On or about June 16, 2011, a male body was discovered floating in Lake Mead near Callville Bay.
- On May 1, 2022, a body was found in a barrel which may have been stuck in mud since the late 1970s or early 1980s. Identification efforts were not successful until 2026, when the body was identified as Edward Lelburian “Buddy” Jackson.
- On May 7, 2022, the remains of Thomas Erndt were found, who died of an apparent drowning in 2002.
- By August 15, 2022, four more bodies had been found.

== Recreation and marinas ==
Lake Mead provides many types of recreation to locals and visitors, including boating, fishing, swimming, sunbathing, and water skiing. Four marinas are located on Lake Mead: Las Vegas Boat Harbor and Lake Mead Marina (in Hemenway Harbor, NV) operated by the Gripentogs, and Callville Bay (in Callville Bay, NV) and Temple Bar (in Arizona). The area has many coves with rocky cliffs and sandy beaches.

Between 2007-2015, Lake Mead had the most fatalities of any national park with 317 deaths among 120 million recreational visits - the vast majority being drownings.

Several small to medium-sized islands occur in the lake area depending on the water level, the largest of which is Oberlink Island. The Alan Bible Visitor Center hosts the Alan Bible Botanical Garden, a small garden of cactus and other plants native to the Mojave Desert. The Grand Wash is a recreational area located in the north side of the lake.

On October 28, 1971, Lake Mead hosted the 1st ever B.A.S.S Bassmaster Classic. This fishing site was a "mystery lake" and the 24 anglers were not told of the location of the tournament until their plane was in the air. The "winner take all" payout of $10,000 was won by Bobby Murray of Arkansas.

The Desert Princess, operated by Lake Mead Cruises, is a three-level paddle wheeler certified by the U.S. Coast Guard to carry 275 passengers. It cruises to the Hoover Dam five days a week.

== B-29 crash ==
At the bottom of the lake is a Boeing B-29 Superfortress that crashed in 1948 while testing a prototype missile guidance system known as "suntracker".

The wreckages of at least two smaller airplanes are submerged in Lake Mead.

== Lake Mead and the Hoover Dam in popular culture ==
The 2018 novel Lords of St. Thomas, by Jackson Ellis, tells the story of the last family to vacate the flooded town of St. Thomas in 1938, following construction of the Hoover Dam and creation of Lake Mead.

Lake Mead, Hoover Dam, and the wrecked B-29 play a large role in the setting of the video game Fallout: New Vegas.

Lake Mead appeared in an episode of BuzzFeed Unsolved Desert Lore in 2025.

== See also ==
- List of drying lakes
- List of reservoirs and dams in the United States
